= List of heteropteran bugs recorded in Britain =

This is a list of the heteropteran bugs recorded in Britain.

== Cimicomorpha ==
=== Cimicoidea ===
==== Anthocoridae ====
===== Anthocorinae =====
====== Acompocoris ======
- Acompocoris alpinus
- Acompocoris pygmaeus

====== Anthocoris ======
- Anthocoris amplicollis
- Anthocoris butleri
- Anthocoris confusus
- Anthocoris gallarum-ulmi
- Anthocoris limbatus
- Anthocoris minki
- Anthocoris nemoralis
- Anthocoris nemorum
- Anthocoris pilosus
- Anthocoris sarothamni
- Anthocoris simulans
- Anthocoris visci

====== Elatophilus ======
- Elatophilus nigricornis

====== Orius ======
- Orius laevigatus
- Orius laticollis
- Orius majusculus
- Orius niger
- Orius vicinus

====== Temnostethus ======
- Temnostethus gracilis
- Temnostethus pusillus
- Temnostethus tibialis

====== Tetraphleps ======
- Tetraphleps bicuspis

==== Lyctocoridae ====
===== Brachysteles =====
- Brachysteles parvicornis

===== Buchananiella =====
- Buchananiella continua

===== Cardiastethus =====
- Cardiastethus fasciiventris

===== Dufouriellus =====
- Dufouriellus ater

===== Lyctocoris =====
- Lyctocoris campestris

===== Xylocoridea =====
- Xylocoridea brevipennis

===== Xylocoris =====
- Xylocoris cursitans
- Xylocoris formicetorum
- Xylocoris galactinus

==== Cimicidae ====
===== Cimex =====
- Cimex columbarius
- Cimex dissimilis
- Cimex lectularius
- Cimex pipistrelli

===== Oeciacus =====
- Oeciacus hirundinis

==== Microphysidae ====
===== Loricula =====
- Loricula coleoptrata
- Loricula distinguenda
- Loricula elegantula
- Loricula exilis
- Loricula inconspicua
- Loricula pselaphiformis
- Loricula ruficeps

==== Nabidae ====
===== Himacerus =====
- Himacerus apterus
- Himacerus mirmicoides
- Himacerus boops
- Himacerus major

===== Nabis =====
- Nabis brevis
- Nabis ericetorum
- Nabis ferus
- Nabis flavomarginatus
- Nabis limbatus
- Nabis lineatus
- Nabis pseudoferus
- Nabis rugosus

===== Prostemma =====
- Prostemma guttula

=== Miroidea ===
==== Miridae ====
===== Bryocorinae =====
====== Bryocoris ======
- Bryocoris pteridis

====== Campyloneura ======
- Campyloneura virgula

====== Dicyphus ======
- Dicyphus annulatus
- Dicyphus constrictus
- Dicyphus epilobii
- Dicyphus errans
- Dicyphus escalerae
- Dicyphus globulifer
- Dicyphus pallicornis
- Dicyphus pallidus
- Dicyphus stachydis

====== Macrolophus ======
- Macrolophus pygmaeus
- Macrolophus rubi

====== Monalocoris ======
- Monalocoris filicis

====== Tupiocoris ======
- Tupiocoris rhododendri

===== Deraeocorinae =====
====== Alloeotomus ======
- Alloeotomus gothicus

====== Bothynotus ======
- Bothynotus pilosus

====== Deraeocoris ======
- Deraeocoris flavilinea
- Deraeocoris lutescens
- Deraeocoris olivaceus
- Deraeocoris ruber
- Deraeocoris scutellaris

===== Mirinae =====
====== Acetropis ======
- Acetropis gimmerthalii

====== Adelphocoris ======
- Adelphocoris lineolatus
- Adelphocoris seticornis
- Adelphocoris ticinensis

====== Agnocoris ======
- Agnocoris reclairei

====== Apolygus ======
- Apolygus limbatus
- Apolygus lucorum
- Apolygus spinolae

====== Calocoris ======
- Calocoris alpestris
- Calocoris norwegicus
- Calocoris roseomaculatus

====== Camptozygum ======
- Camptozygum aequale

====== Capsodes ======
- Capsodes flavomarginatus
- Capsodes gothicus
- Capsodes sulcatus

====== Capsus ======
- Capsus ater
- Capsus wagneri

====== Charagochilus ======
- Charagochilus gyllenhalii
- Charagochilus weberi

====== Closterotomus ======
- Closterotomus fulvomaculatus
- Closterotomus trivialis

====== Dichrooscytus ======
- Dichrooscytus gustavi
- Dichrooscytus rufipennis

====== Grypocoris ======
- Grypocoris stysi

====== Hadrodemus ======
- Hadrodemus m-flavum

====== Leptopterna ======
- Leptopterna dolabrata
- Leptopterna ferrugata

====== Liocoris ======
- Liocoris tripustulatus

====== Lygocoris ======
- Lygocoris pabulinus
- Lygocoris rugicollis

====== Lygus ======
- Lygus maritimus
- Lygus pratensis
- Lygus punctatus
- Lygus rugulipennis
- Lygus wagneri

====== Megacoelum ======
- Megacoelum infusum

====== Pseudomegacoelum ======
- Pseudomegacoelum beckeri (Fieber, 1870) - synonym Megacoelum beckeri

====== Megaloceroea ======
- Megaloceroea recticornis

====== Miridius ======
- Miridius quadrivirgatus

====== Miris ======
- Miris striatus

====== Myrmecoris ======
- Myrmecoris gracilis

====== Neolygus ======
- Neolygus contaminatus
- Neolygus populi
- Neolygus viridis

====== Notostira ======
- Notostira elongata
- Notostira erratica

====== Orthops ======
- Orthops basalis
- Orthops campestris
- Orthops kalmii

====== Pantilius ======
- Pantilius tunicatus

====== Phytocoris ======
- Phytocoris dimidiatus
- Phytocoris insignis
- Phytocoris longipennis
- Phytocoris pini
- Phytocoris populi
- Phytocoris reuteri
- Phytocoris tiliae
- Phytocoris ulmi
- Phytocoris varipes

====== Pinalitus ======
- Pinalitus atomarius
- Pinalitus cervinus
- Pinalitus rubricatus
- Pinalitus viscicola

====== Pithanus ======
- Pithanus maerkelii

====== Polymerus ======
- Polymerus nigrita
- Polymerus palustris
- Polymerus unifasciatus
- Polymerus vulneratus

====== Rhabdomiris ======
- Rhabdomiris striatellus

====== Stenodema ======
- Stenodema calcarata
- Stenodema holsata
- Stenodema laevigatum
- Stenodema trispinosa

====== Stenotus ======
- Stenotus binotatus

====== Teratocoris ======
- Teratocoris antennatus
- Teratocoris caricis
- Teratocoris saundersi
- Teratocoris viridis

====== Trigonotylus ======
- Trigonotylus caelestialium
- Trigonotylus psammaecolor
- Trigonotylus ruficornis

====== Tropidosteptes ======
- Tropidosteptes pacificus

====== Zygimus ======
- Zygimus nigriceps

===== Orthotylinae =====
====== Blepharidopterus ======
- Blepharidopterus angulatus
- Blepharidopterus diaphanus

====== Brachynotocoris ======
- Brachynotocoris puncticornis

====== Cyllecoris ======
- Cyllecoris histrionius

====== Cyrtorhinus ======
- Cyrtorhinus caricis

====== Dryophilocoris ======
- Dryophilocoris flavoquadrimaculatus

====== Fieberocapsus ======
- Fieberocapsus flaveolus

====== Globiceps ======
- Globiceps flavomaculatus
- Globiceps fulvicollis
- Globiceps juniperi

====== Halticus ======
- Halticus apterus
- Halticus luteicollis
- Halticus macrocephalus
- Halticus saltator

====== Heterocordylus ======
- Heterocordylus genistae
- Heterocordylus tibialis

====== Heterotoma ======
- Heterotoma planicornis

====== Malacocoris ======
- Malacocoris chlorizans

====== Mecomma ======
- Mecomma ambulans
- Mecomma dispar

====== Orthocephalus ======
- Orthocephalus coriaceus
- Orthocephalus saltator

====== Orthotylus ======
- Orthotylus adenocarpi
- Orthotylus bilineatus
- Orthotylus caprai
- Orthotylus concolor
- Orthotylus ericetorum
- Orthotylus flavinervis
- Orthotylus flavosparsus
- Orthotylus fuscescens
- Orthotylus marginalis
- Orthotylus moncreaffi
- Orthotylus nassatus
- Orthotylus ochrotrichus
- Orthotylus prasinus
- Orthotylus rubidus
- Orthotylus tenellus
- Orthotylus virens
- Orthotylus virescens
- Orthotylus viridinervis

====== Pachytomella ======
- Pachytomella parallela

====== Platycranus ======
- Platycranus bicolor

====== Pseudoloxops ======
- Pseudoloxops coccineus

====== Reuteria ======
- Reuteria marqueti

====== Strongylocoris ======
- Strongylocoris leucocephalus
- Strongylocoris luridus

===== Phylinae =====
====== Amblytylus ======
- Amblytylus brevicollis
- Amblytylus delicatus
- Amblytylus nasutus

====== Asciodema ======
- Asciodema obsoleta

====== Atractotomus ======
- Atractotomus magnicornis
- Atractotomus mali
- Atractotomus parvulus

====== Brachyarthrum ======
- Brachyarthrum limitatum

====== Campylomma ======
- Campylomma annulicorne
- Campylomma verbasci

====== Chlamydatus ======
- Chlamydatus evanescens
- Chlamydatus pulicarius
- Chlamydatus pullus
- Chlamydatus saltitans
- Chlamydatus wilkinsoni

====== Compsidolon ======
- Compsidolon salicellum

====== Conostethus ======
- Conostethus brevis
- Conostethus griseus
- Conostethus roseus
- Conostethus venustus

====== Europiella ======
- Europiella artemisiae
- Europiella decolor

====== Hallodapus ======
- Hallodapus montandoni
- Hallodapus rufescens

====== Harpocera ======
- Harpocera thoracica

====== Hoplomachus ======
- Hoplomachus thunbergii

====== Hypseloecus ======
- Hypseloecus visci

====== Lopus ======
- Lopus decolor

====== Macrotylus ======
- Macrotylus horvathi
- Macrotylus paykulli
- Macrotylus solitarius

====== Megalocoleus ======
- Megalocoleus molliculus
- Megalocoleus tanaceti

====== Monosynamma ======
- Monosynamma bohemanni
- Monosynamma maritimum
- Monosynamma sabulicola

====== Oncotylus ======
- Oncotylus viridiflavus

====== Orthonotus ======
- Orthonotus rufifrons

====== Parapsallus ======
- Parapsallus vitellinus

====== Phoenicocoris ======
- Phoenicocoris obscurellus

====== Phylus ======
- Phylus coryli
- Phylus melanocephalus

====== Pilophorus ======
- Pilophorus cinnamopterus
- Pilophorus clavatus
- Pilophorus confusus
- Pilophorus perplexus

====== Placochilus ======
- Placochilus seladonicus

====== Plagiognathus ======
- Plagiognathus arbustorum
- Plagiognathus chrysanthemi

====== Plesiodema ======
- Plesiodema pinetella

====== Psallodema ======
- Psallodema fieberi

====== Psallus ======
- Psallus albicinctus
- Psallus ambiguus
- Psallus assimilis
- Psallus betuleti
- Psallus confusus
- Psallus falleni
- Psallus flavellus
- Psallus haematodes
- Psallus lepidus
- Psallus luridus
- Psallus mollis
- Psallus montanus
- Psallus perrisi
- Psallus pseudoplatani
- Psallus quercus
- Psallus salicis
- Psallus variabilis
- Psallus varians
- Psallus wagneri

====== Salicarus ======
- Salicarus roseri

====== Sthenarus ======
- Sthenarus rotermundi

====== Systellonotus ======
- Systellonotus triguttatus

====== Tinicephalus ======
- Tinicephalus hortulanus

====== Tuponia ======
- Tuponia brevirostris
- Tuponia mixticolor

====== Tytthus ======
- Tytthus pubescens
- Tytthus pygmaeus

==== Tingidae ====
===== Acalypta =====
- Acalypta brunnea
- Acalypta carinata
- Acalypta nigrina
- Acalypta parvula
- Acalypta platycheila

===== Agramma =====
- Agramma laetum

===== Campylosteira =====
- Campylosteira verna

===== Catoplatus =====
- Catoplatus fabricii

===== Corythucha =====
- Corythucha ciliata

===== Derephysia =====
- Derephysia foliacea

===== Dictyla =====
- Dictyla convergens

===== Dictyonota =====
- Dictyonota fuliginosa
- Dictyonota strichnocera

===== Kalama =====
- Kalama tricornis

===== Lasiacantha =====
- Lasiacantha capucina

===== Oncochila =====
- Oncochila simplex

===== Physatocheila =====
- Physatocheila dumetorum
- Physatocheila harwoodi
- Physatocheila smreczynskii

===== Stephanitis =====
- Stephanitis rhododendri
- Stephanitis takeyai

===== Tingis =====
- Tingis ampliata
- Tingis angustata
- Tingis cardui
- Tingis reticulata

==== Reduviidae ====
===== Emesinae =====
====== Empicoris ======
- Empicoris baerensprungi
- Empicoris culiciformis
- Empicoris vagabundus

===== Harpactorinae =====
====== Coranus ======
- Coranus aethiops
- Coranus subapterus
- Coranus woodroffei

===== Reduviinae =====
====== Reduvius ======
- Reduvius personatus

===== Stenopodainae =====
====== Oncocephalus ======
- Oncocephalus pilicornis

====== Pygolampis ======
- Pygolampis bidentata

== Dipsocoromorpha ==
=== Dipsocoroidea ===
==== Ceratocombidae ====
===== Ceratocombus =====
- Ceratocombus coleoptratus

==== Dipsocoridae ====
===== Cryptostemma =====
- Cryptostemma alienum - synonym Pachycoleus alienum

===== Pachycoleus =====
- Pachycoleus waltli

== Leptopodomorpha ==
=== Saldoidea ===
==== Aepophilidae ====
===== Aepophilus =====
- Aepophilus bonnairei

==== Saldidae ====
===== Chiloxanthinae =====
====== Chiloxanthus ======
- Chiloxanthus pilosus

===== Saldinae =====
====== Chartoscirta ======
- Chartoscirta cincta
- Chartoscirta cocksii
- Chartoscirta elegantula

====== Halosalda ======
- Halosalda lateralis

====== Micracanthia ======
- Micracanthia marginalis

====== Salda ======
- Salda littoralis
- Salda morio
- Salda muelleri

====== Saldula ======
- Saldula arenicola
- Saldula c-album
- Saldula fucicola
- Saldula melanoscela
- Saldula opacula
- Saldula orthochila
- Saldula pallipes
- Saldula palustris
- Saldula pilosella
- Saldula saltatoria
- Saldula scotica
- Saldula setulosa

====== Teloleuca ======
- Teloleuca pellucens

== Nepomorpha ==
=== Corixoidea ===
==== Corixidae ====
===== Corixinae =====
====== Arctocorisa ======
- Arctocorisa carinata
- Arctocorisa germari

====== Callicorixa ======
- Callicorixa praeusta
- Callicorixa wollastoni

====== Corixa ======
- Corixa affinis
- Corixa dentipes
- Corixa iberica
- Corixa panzeri
- Corixa punctata

====== Glaenocorisa ======
- Glaenocorisa cavifrons
- Glaenocorisa propinqua

====== Hesperocorixa ======
- Hesperocorixa castanea
- Hesperocorixa linnaei
- Hesperocorixa moesta
- Hesperocorixa sahlbergi

====== Paracorixa ======
- Paracorixa concinna

====== Sigara ======
- Sigara distincta
- Sigara dorsalis
- Sigara falleni
- Sigara fallenoidea
- Sigara fossarum
- Sigara iactans
- Sigara lateralis
- Sigara limitata
- Sigara longipalis
- Sigara nigrolineata
- Sigara scotti
- Sigara selecta
- Sigara semistriata
- Sigara stagnalis
- Sigara striata
- Sigara venusta

===== Cymatiainae =====
====== Cymatia ======
- Cymatia bonsdorffii
- Cymatia coleoptrata
- Cymatia rogenhoferi

===== Micronectinae =====
====== Micronecta ======
- Micronecta griseola
- Micronecta minutissima
- Micronecta poweri
- Micronecta scholtzi

=== Gerroidea ===
==== Gerridae ====
===== Aquarius =====
- Aquarius najas
- Aquarius paludum

===== Gerris =====
- Gerris argentatus
- Gerris costae
- Gerris gibbifer
- Gerris lacustris
- Gerris lateralis
- Gerris odontogaster
- Gerris thoracicus

===== Limnoporus =====
- Limnoporus rufoscutellatus

==== Veliidae ====
===== Microvelia =====
- Microvelia buenoi
- Microvelia pygmaea
- Microvelia reticulata

===== Velia =====
- Velia caprai
- Velia saulii

=== Hebroidea ===
==== Hebridae ====
===== Hebrus =====
- Hebrus pusillus
- Hebrus ruficeps

=== Hydrometroidea ===
==== Hydrometridae ====
===== Hydrometra =====
- Hydrometra gracilenta
- Hydrometra stagnorum

=== Mesovelioidea ===
==== Mesoveliidae ====
===== Mesovelia =====
- Mesovelia furcata

=== Naucoroidea ===
==== Aphelocheiridae ====
===== Aphelocheirus =====
- Aphelocheirus aestivalis

==== Naucoridae ====
===== Naucorinae =====
====== Naucoris ======
- Naucoris maculatus

====== Ilyocoris ======
- Ilyocoris cimicoides

=== Nepoidea ===
==== Nepidae ====
===== Nepinae =====
====== Nepa ======
- Nepa cinerea

===== Ranatrinae =====
====== Ranatra ======
- Ranatra linearis

=== Notonectoidea ===
==== Notonectidae ====
===== Notonecta =====
- Notonecta glauca
- Notonecta maculata
- Notonecta obliqua
- Notonecta viridis

=== Pleoidea ===
==== Pleidae ====
===== Plea =====
- Plea minutissima

== Pentatomomorpha ==
=== Aradoidea ===
==== Aradidae ====
===== Aneurinae =====
====== Aneurus ======
- Aneurus avenius

===== Aradinae =====
====== Aradus ======
- Aradus aterrimus
- Aradus betulae
- Aradus cinnamomeus
- Aradus corticalis
- Aradus depressus

====== Aneurus ======
- Aneurus laevis

=== Coreoidea ===
==== Alydidae ====
===== Alydus =====
- Alydus calcaratus

==== Coreidae ====
===== Coreinae =====
====== Coreus ======
- Coreus marginatus

====== Enoplops ======
- Enoplops scapha

====== Gonocerus ======
- Gonocerus acuteangulatus

====== Leptoglossus ======
- Leptoglossus occidentalis

====== Spathocera ======
- Spathocera dalmanii

====== Syromastus ======
- Syromastus rhombeus

===== Pseudophloeinae =====
====== Arenocoris ======
- Arenocoris falleni
- Arenocoris waltlii

====== Bathysolen ======
- Bathysolen nubilus

====== Ceraleptus ======
- Ceraleptus lividus

====== Coriomeris ======
- Coriomeris denticulatus

==== Rhopalidae ====
===== Brachycarenus =====
- Brachycarenus tigrinus

===== Chorosoma =====
- Chorosoma schillingii

===== Corizus =====
- Corizus hyoscyami

===== Liorhyssus =====
- Liorhyssus hyalinus

===== Myrmus =====
- Myrmus miriformis

===== Rhopalus =====
- Rhopalus maculatus
- Rhopalus parumpunctatus
- Rhopalus rufus
- Rhopalus subrufus

===== Stictopleurus =====
- Stictopleurus abutilon
- Stictopleurus punctatonervosus

==== Stenocephalidae ====
===== Dicranocephalus =====
- Dicranocephalus agilis
- Dicranocephalus albipes
- Dicranocephalus medius

=== Lygaeoidea ===
==== Berytidae ====
===== Berytinae =====
====== Berytinus ======
- Berytinus clavipes
- Berytinus crassipes
- Berytinus hirticornis
- Berytinus minor
- Berytinus montivagus
- Berytinus signoreti

====== Neides ======
- Neides tipularius

===== Gampsocorinae =====
====== Gampsocoris ======
- Gampsocoris punctipes

===== Metacanthinae =====
====== Metatropis ======
- Metatropis rufescens

==== Lygaeidae ====
===== Artheneinae =====
====== Chilacis ======
- Chilacis typhae

===== Blissinae =====
====== Ischnodemus ======
- Ischnodemus quadratus
- Ischnodemus sabuleti

===== Cyminae =====
====== Cymus ======
- Cymus aurescens
- Cymus claviculus
- Cymus glandicolor
- Cymus melanocephalus

===== Henestarinae =====
====== Henestaris ======
- Henestaris halophilus
- Henestaris laticeps

===== Heterogastrinae =====
====== Heterogaster ======
- Heterogaster artemisiae
- Heterogaster urticae

===== Ischnorhynchinae =====
====== Kleidocerys ======
- Kleidocerys ericae
- Kleidocerys resedae

===== Lygaeinae =====
====== Arocatus ======
- Arocatus longiceps

====== Lygaeus ======
- Lygaeus equestris
- Lygaeus simulans

===== Orsillinae =====
====== Nysius ======
- Nysius cymoides
- Nysius ericae
- Nysius graminicola
- Nysius helveticus
- Nysius huttoni
- Nysius senecionis
- Nysius thymi

====== Orsillus ======
- Orsillus depressus

====== Ortholomus ======
- Ortholomus punctipennis

===== Oxycareninae =====
====== Macroplax ======
- Macroplax preyssleri

====== Metopoplax ======
- Metopoplax ditomoides
- Metopoplax fuscinervis

===== Rhyparochrominae =====
====== Acompus ======
- Acompus pallipes
- Acompus rufipes

====== Aphanus ======
- Aphanus rolandri

====== Beosus ======
- Beosus maritimus

====== Drymus ======
- Drymus brunneus
- Drymus latus
- Drymus pilicornis
- Drymus pilipes
- Drymus pumilio
- Drymus ryei
- Drymus sylvaticus

====== Emblethis ======
- Emblethis denticollis
- Emblethis griseus

====== Eremocoris ======
- Eremocoris abietis
- Eremocoris fenestratus
- Eremocoris plebejus
- Eremocoris podagricus

====== Gastrodes ======
- Gastrodes abietum
- Gastrodes grossipes

====== Graptopeltus ======
- Graptopeltus lynceus

====== Ischnocoris ======
- Ischnocoris angustulus

====== Lamproplax ======
- Lamproplax picea

====== Lasiosomus ======
- Lasiosomus enervis

====== Macrodema ======
- Macrodema micropterum

====== Megalonotus ======
- Megalonotus antennatus
- Megalonotus chiragra
- Megalonotus dilatatus
- Megalonotus emarginatus
- Megalonotus praetextatus
- Megalonotus sabulicola

====== Notochilus ======
- Notochilus limbatus

====== Pachybrachius ======
- Pachybrachius fracticollis
- Pachybrachius luridus

====== Peritrechus ======
- Peritrechus angusticollis
- Peritrechus convivus
- Peritrechus geniculatus
- Peritrechus gracilicornis
- Peritrechus lundii
- Peritrechus nubilus

====== Pionosomus ======
- Pionosomus varius

====== Plinthisus ======
- Plinthisus brevipennis

====== Pterotmetus ======
- Pterotmetus staphyliniformis

====== Raglius ======
- Raglius alboacuminatus

====== Rhyparochromus ======
- Rhyparochromus pini
- Rhyparochromus vulgaris

====== Scolopostethus ======
- Scolopostethus affinis
- Scolopostethus decoratus
- Scolopostethus grandis
- Scolopostethus pictus
- Scolopostethus puberulus
- Scolopostethus thomsoni

====== Sphragisticus ======
- Sphragisticus nebulosus

====== Stygnocoris ======
- Stygnocoris fuligineus
- Stygnocoris rusticus
- Stygnocoris sabulosus

====== Taphropeltus ======
- Taphropeltus contractus
- Taphropeltus hamulatus

====== Trapezonotus ======
- Trapezonotus arenarius
- Trapezonotus desertus
- Trapezonotus dispar
- Trapezonotus ullrichi

====== Tropistethus ======
- Tropistethus holosericeus

====== Xanthochilus ======
- Xanthochilus quadratus

==== Pyrrhocoridae ====
===== Pyrrhocoris =====
- Pyrrhocoris apterus

=== Pentatomoidea ===
==== Acanthosomatidae ====
===== Acanthosoma =====
- Acanthosoma haemorrhoidale

===== Cyphostethus =====
- Cyphostethus tristriatus

===== Elasmostethus =====
- Elasmostethus interstinctus

===== Elasmucha =====
- Elasmucha ferrugata
- Elasmucha grisea

==== Cydnidae ====
===== Cydninae =====
====== Byrsinus ======
- Byrsinus flavicornis

===== Sehirinae =====
====== Adomerus ======
- Adomerus biguttatus

====== Canthophorus ======
- Canthophorus impressus

====== Geotomus ======
- Geotomus punctulatus

====== Legnotus ======
- Legnotus limbosus
- Legnotus picipes

====== Sehirus ======
- Sehirus luctuosus

====== Tritomegas ======
- Tritomegas bicolor
- Tritomegas sexmaculatus

==== Pentatomidae ====
===== Asopinae =====
====== Jalla ======
- Jalla dumosa

====== Picromerus ======
- Picromerus bidens

====== Rhacognathus ======
- Rhacognathus punctatus

====== Troilus ======
- Troilus luridus

====== Zicrona ======
- Zicrona caerulea

===== Pentatominae =====
====== Aelia ======
- Aelia acuminata

====== Carpocoris ======
- Carpocoris pudicus
- Carpocoris purpureipennis

===== Chlorochroa =====
(synonym Pitedia)

- Chlorochroa juniperina

====== Dolycoris ======
- Dolycoris baccarum

====== Eurydema ======
- Eurydema dominulus
- Eurydema oleracea
- Eurydema ornata

====== Eysarcoris ======
- Eysarcoris aeneus
- Eysarcoris venustissimus

====== Neottiglossa ======
- Neottiglossa pusilla

====== Nezara ======
- Nezara viridula

====== Palomena ======
- Palomena prasina

====== Pentatoma ======
- Pentatoma rufipes

====== Peribalus ======
- Peribalus strictus

====== Piezodorus ======
- Piezodorus lituratus

====== Rhaphigaster ======
- Rhaphigaster nebulosa

====== Sciocoris ======
- Sciocoris cursitans

===== Podopinae =====
====== Podops ======
- Podops inuncta

==== Scutelleridae ====
===== Eurygastrinae =====
====== Eurygaster ======
- Eurygaster austriaca
- Eurygaster maura
- Eurygaster testudinaria

===== Scutelleridae =====
====== Odontoscelis ======
- Odontoscelis fuliginosa
- Odontoscelis lineola

==== Thyreocoridae ====
===== Thyreocoris =====
- Thyreocoris scarabaeoides

=== Piesmatoidea ===
==== Piesmatidae ====
===== Parapiesma =====
- Parapiesma quadratum

===== Piesma =====
- Piesma maculatum
