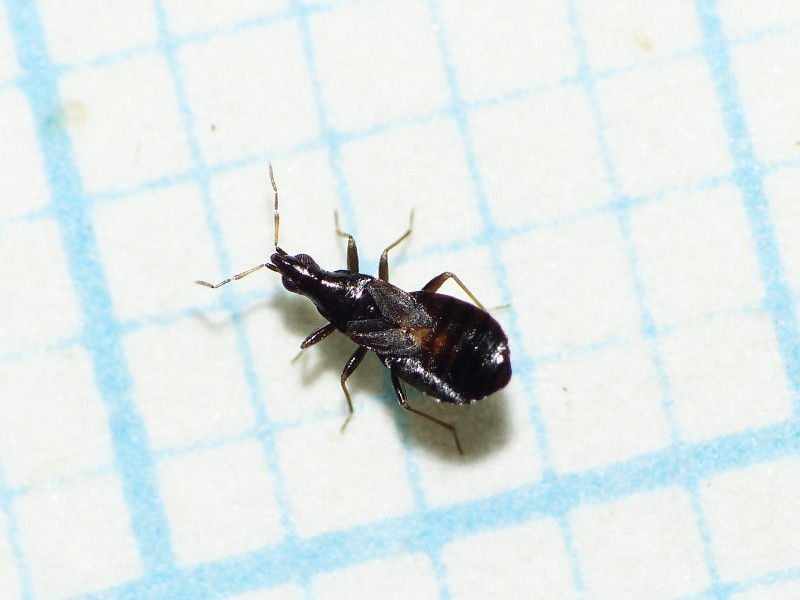
- Xylocoridea brevipennis, Kampina, the Netherlands

Scientific classification
- Kingdom: Animalia
- Phylum: Arthropoda
- Class: Insecta
- Order: Hemiptera
- Suborder: Heteroptera
- Family: Anthocoridae
- Subfamily: Anthocorinae
- Tribe: Dufouriellini
- Genus: Xylocoridea; Reuter, 1876
- Species: X. brevipennis

Binomial name
- Xylocoridea brevipennis Reuter, 1876

= Xylocoridea =

Genus and species of true bugs

Xylocoridea is a monotypic genus of exclusively European flower bugs in the tribe Dufouriellini, erected by Odo Reuter in 1876. The "xylo-" prefix indicates that these insects are associated with wood.

== Species ==
The single species Xylocoridea brevipennis Reuter, 1876 is recorded from Europe including: France, Germany, Belgium, the Netherlands, Italy and the British Isles (mostly southern England). This species is commonly found under bark in deciduous and coniferous woodland, with recorded trees including: Pinus, Platanus and Tilia.

== See also ==
- List of heteropteran bugs recorded in Britain
