= Zygimus =

Scientific classification
- Domain: Eukaryota
- Kingdom: Animalia
- Phylum: Arthropoda
- Class: Insecta
- Order: Hemiptera
- Suborder: Heteroptera
- Family: Miridae
- Subfamily: Mirinae
- Tribe: Mirini
- Genus: Zygimus; Fieber, 1870

Genus of true bugs

Zygimus is a genus of European capsid bugs in the tribe Mirini, erected by Franz Xaver Fieber in 1870. It is probably monotypic with records of Zygimus nigriceps (Fallén, 1829) (synonym Phytocois nigriceps Fallén, 1829) from Scandinavia, northern England and Scotland.

== Description ==
Z. nigriceps is about 4 mm long and has a black head and pronotum and leaf-green forewings. It can be distinguished from the similar bug Orthotylus virens by having a brownish membrane with yellow veins. In Britain, this species is considered rare and confined to northern juniper scrub; adults can be found from June to September.

== See also ==
List of heteropteran bugs recorded in Britain
