= Physopleurella =

Scientific classification
- Kingdom: Animalia
- Phylum: Arthropoda
- Clade: Pancrustacea
- Class: Insecta
- Order: Hemiptera
- Suborder: Heteroptera
- Family: Anthocoridae
- Tribe: Dufouriellini
- Genus: Physopleurella; Reuter, 1884

Genus of true bugs

Physopleurella is a genus of bugs in the family Anthocoridae. There are at least three described species in Physopleurella.

== Species ==
These three species belong to the genus Physopleurella:

- Physopleurella armata (Poppius, 1909)^{g}
- Physopleurella floridana Blatchley, 1925^{i c g}
- Physopleurella mundula (White, 1877)^{i c g b}

Data sources: i = ITIS, c = Catalogue of Life, g = GBIF, b = Bugguide.net
