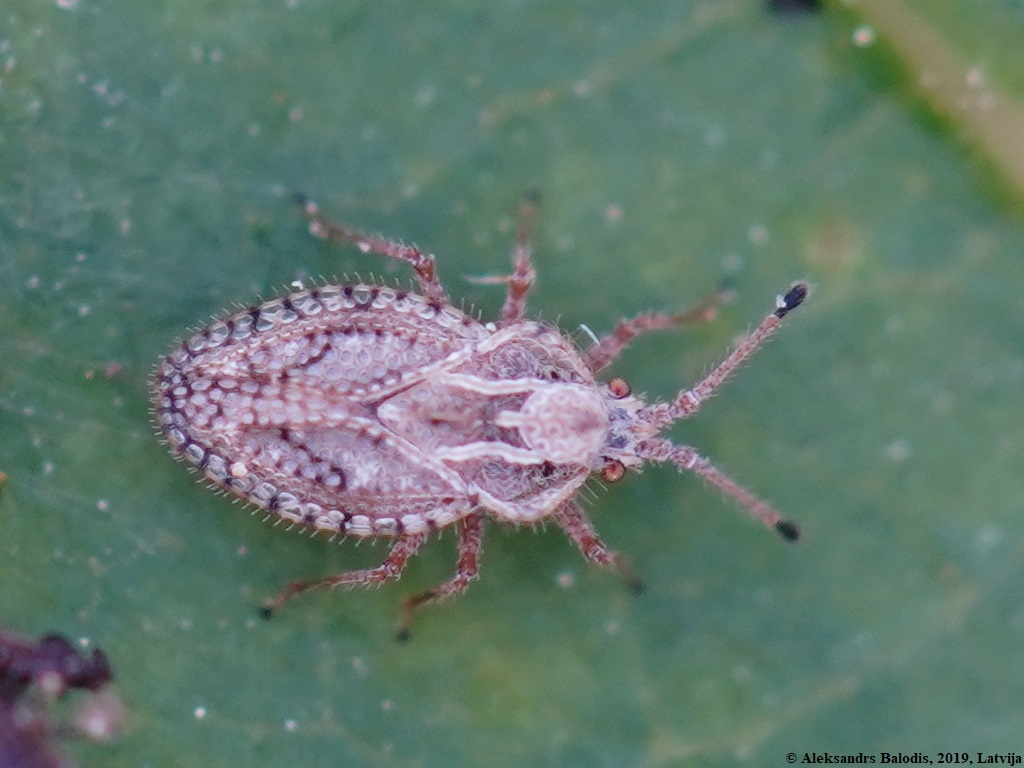

Scientific classification
- Domain: Eukaryota
- Kingdom: Animalia
- Phylum: Arthropoda
- Class: Insecta
- Order: Hemiptera
- Suborder: Heteroptera
- Family: Tingidae
- Genus: Lasiacantha
- Species: L. capucina

Binomial name
- Lasiacantha capucina (Germar, 1836)

= Lasiacantha capucina =

Species of true bug

Lasiacantha capucina is a species of true bug belonging to the family Tingidae.

It is native to Europe.
