= Acetropis americana =

Scientific classification
- Kingdom: Animalia
- Phylum: Arthropoda
- Class: Insecta
- Order: Hemiptera
- Suborder: Heteroptera
- Family: Miridae
- Genus: Acetropis
- Species: A. americana

Binomial name
- Acetropis americana Knight, 1927

Species of true bug

Acetropis americana, the American grass bug, is a rare true bug found in the Willamette Valley of the U.S. state of Oregon.
