= Neottiglossa sulcifrons =

Scientific classification
- Kingdom: Animalia
- Phylum: Arthropoda
- Clade: Pancrustacea
- Class: Insecta
- Order: Hemiptera
- Suborder: Heteroptera
- Family: Pentatomidae
- Tribe: Aelini
- Genus: Neottiglossa
- Species: N. sulcifrons

Binomial name
- Neottiglossa sulcifrons Stål, 1872

Species of true bug

Neottiglossa sulcifrons is a species of stink bug in the family Pentatomidae. It is found in North America.
