= Peritrechus tristis =

Scientific classification
- Domain: Eukaryota
- Kingdom: Animalia
- Phylum: Arthropoda
- Class: Insecta
- Order: Hemiptera
- Suborder: Heteroptera
- Family: Rhyparochromidae
- Genus: Peritrechus
- Species: P. tristis

Binomial name
- Peritrechus tristis Van Duzee, 1906

Species of true bug

Peritrechus tristis is a species of dirt-colored seed bug in the family Rhyparochromidae. It is found in North America.
