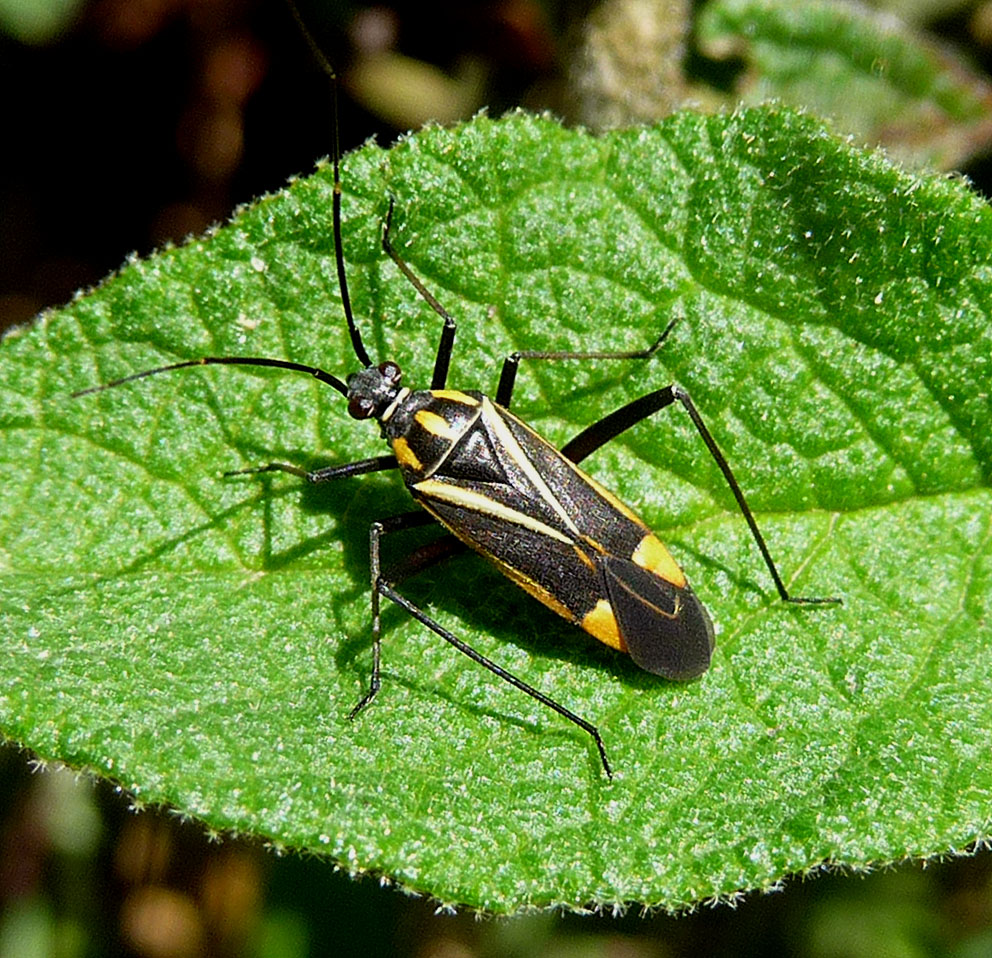
- Hadrodemus m-flavum

Scientific classification
- Domain: Eukaryota
- Kingdom: Animalia
- Phylum: Arthropoda
- Class: Insecta
- Order: Hemiptera
- Suborder: Heteroptera
- Family: Miridae
- Subfamily: Mirinae
- Tribe: Mirini
- Genus: Hadrodemus; Fieber, 1858

Synonyms
- Homodemus Fieber, 1858

= Hadrodemus =

Genus of true bugs

Hadrodemus is a genus of mostly European capsid bugs in the tribe Mirini, discovered by Franz Xaver Fieber in 1858. The type species Hadrodemus m-flavum is recorded from northern Europe including the British Isles.

== Species ==
According to BioLib the following are included:

1. Hadrodemus m-flavum (Goeze, 1778)
  - type species (as Cimex m-flavum Goeze, 1778
  = Cimex marginellus Fabricius, 1781)
2. Hadrodemus noualhieri (Reuter, 1896) (southern France, Iberian peninsula)

== See also ==
- List of heteropteran bugs recorded in Britain
