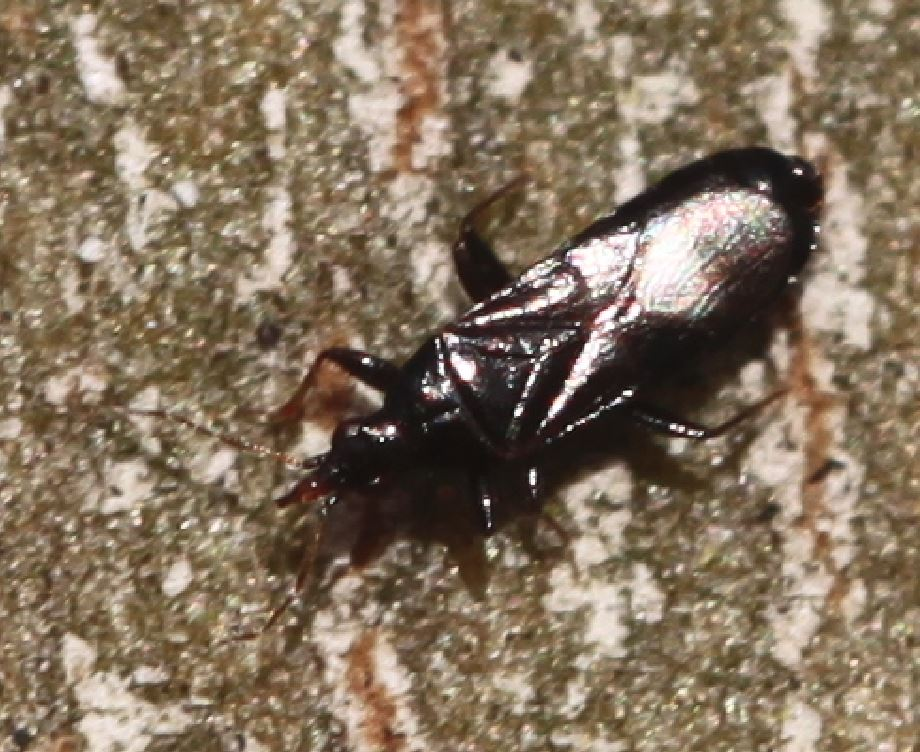
- Dufouriellus ater

Scientific classification
- Kingdom: Animalia
- Phylum: Arthropoda
- Clade: Pancrustacea
- Class: Insecta
- Order: Hemiptera
- Suborder: Heteroptera
- Family: Anthocoridae
- Subfamily: Anthocorinae
- Tribe: Dufouriellini
- Genus: Dufouriellus; Kirkaldy, 1906
- Species: D. ater

Binomial name
- Dufouriellus ater (Dufour, 1833)

= Dufouriellus =

Genus of true bugs

Dufouriellus is a monotypic genus of minute pirate bugs in the tribe Dufouriellini. The described species is Dufouriellus ater, which has been recorded from much of western Europe through to Bohemia, Moravia, Slovakia, southern Scandinavia and including the British Isles.

== See also ==
- List of heteropteran bugs recorded in Britain
