= Ceraleptus probolus =

Scientific classification
- Domain: Eukaryota
- Kingdom: Animalia
- Phylum: Arthropoda
- Class: Insecta
- Order: Hemiptera
- Suborder: Heteroptera
- Family: Coreidae
- Subfamily: Pseudophloeinae
- Genus: Ceraleptus
- Species: C. probolus

Binomial name
- Ceraleptus probolus Froeschner, 1963

Species of true bug

Ceraleptus probolus is a species of leaf-footed bug in the family Coreidae. It is found in North America.
