= Neottiglossa cavifrons =

Scientific classification
- Kingdom: Animalia
- Phylum: Arthropoda
- Clade: Pancrustacea
- Class: Insecta
- Order: Hemiptera
- Suborder: Heteroptera
- Family: Pentatomidae
- Tribe: Aelini
- Genus: Neottiglossa
- Species: N. cavifrons

Binomial name
- Neottiglossa cavifrons Stål, 1872

Synonyms
- Neottiglossa coronaciliata Ruckes, 1957

Species of true bug

Neottiglossa cavifrons is a species of stink bug in the family Pentatomidae. It is found in North America.
