= Physopleurella mundula =

Scientific classification
- Domain: Eukaryota
- Kingdom: Animalia
- Phylum: Arthropoda
- Class: Insecta
- Order: Hemiptera
- Suborder: Heteroptera
- Family: Anthocoridae
- Genus: Physopleurella
- Species: P. mundula

Binomial name
- Physopleurella mundula (White, 1877)

Synonyms
- Cardiastethus mundulus White, 1877

Species of true bug

Physopleurella mundula is a species of bug in the family Anthocoridae. It is found in Oceania.
