= Neottiglossa trilineata =

Scientific classification
- Domain: Eukaryota
- Kingdom: Animalia
- Phylum: Arthropoda
- Class: Insecta
- Order: Hemiptera
- Suborder: Heteroptera
- Family: Pentatomidae
- Genus: Neottiglossa
- Species: N. trilineata

Binomial name
- Neottiglossa trilineata (Kirby, 1837)

Synonyms
- Pentatoma trilineata Kirby, 1837

Species of true bug

Neottiglossa trilineata is a species of stink bug in the family Pentatomidae. It is found in North America.
