= Neottiglossa undata =

Scientific classification
- Domain: Eukaryota
- Kingdom: Animalia
- Phylum: Arthropoda
- Class: Insecta
- Order: Hemiptera
- Suborder: Heteroptera
- Family: Pentatomidae
- Genus: Neottiglossa
- Species: N. undata

Binomial name
- Neottiglossa undata (Say, 1832)

Synonyms
- Neottiglossa californica Bliven, 1958

Species of true bug

Neottiglossa undata is a species of stink bug in the family Pentatomidae. It is found in North America.
