= Peritrechus fraternus =

Scientific classification
- Domain: Eukaryota
- Kingdom: Animalia
- Phylum: Arthropoda
- Class: Insecta
- Order: Hemiptera
- Suborder: Heteroptera
- Family: Rhyparochromidae
- Tribe: Rhyparochromini
- Genus: Peritrechus
- Species: P. fraternus

Binomial name
- Peritrechus fraternus Uhler, 1871

Species of true bug

Peritrechus fraternus is a species of dirt-colored seed bug in the family Rhyparochromidae. It is found in Central America and North America.
