= Ceraleptus pacificus =

Scientific classification
- Domain: Eukaryota
- Kingdom: Animalia
- Phylum: Arthropoda
- Class: Insecta
- Order: Hemiptera
- Suborder: Heteroptera
- Family: Coreidae
- Subfamily: Pseudophloeinae
- Genus: Ceraleptus
- Species: C. pacificus

Binomial name
- Ceraleptus pacificus Barber, 1914

Species of true bug

Ceraleptus pacificus is a species of leaf-footed bug in the family Coreidae. It is found in Central America and North America.
