= Emblethis vicarius =

Scientific classification
- Domain: Eukaryota
- Kingdom: Animalia
- Phylum: Arthropoda
- Class: Insecta
- Order: Hemiptera
- Suborder: Heteroptera
- Family: Rhyparochromidae
- Tribe: Gonianotini
- Genus: Emblethis
- Species: E. vicarius

Binomial name
- Emblethis vicarius Horvath, 1908

Species of true bug

Emblethis vicarius, the sand bug, is a species of dirt-colored seed bug in the family Rhyparochromidae.
