= Neottiglossa tumidifrons =

Scientific classification
- Domain: Eukaryota
- Kingdom: Animalia
- Phylum: Arthropoda
- Class: Insecta
- Order: Hemiptera
- Suborder: Heteroptera
- Family: Pentatomidae
- Subfamily: Pentatominae
- Genus: Neottiglossa
- Species: N. tumidifrons

Binomial name
- Neottiglossa tumidifrons Downes, 1928

Species of true bug

Neottiglossa tumidifrons is a species of stink bug in the family Pentatomidae. It is found in North America.
