= Ceraleptus americanus =

Scientific classification
- Kingdom: Animalia
- Phylum: Arthropoda
- Clade: Pancrustacea
- Class: Insecta
- Order: Hemiptera
- Suborder: Heteroptera
- Family: Coreidae
- Subfamily: Pseudophloeinae
- Genus: Ceraleptus
- Species: C. americanus

Binomial name
- Ceraleptus americanus Stål, 1870

Species of true bug

Ceraleptus americanus is a species of leaf-footed bug in the family Coreidae. It is found in North America.
