= Europiella stigmosa =

Scientific classification
- Kingdom: Animalia
- Phylum: Arthropoda
- Class: Insecta
- Order: Hemiptera
- Suborder: Heteroptera
- Family: Miridae
- Subfamily: Phylinae
- Tribe: Phylini
- Genus: Europiella
- Species: E. stigmosa

Binomial name
- Europiella stigmosa (Uhler, 1893)

Synonyms
- Agalliastes stigmosus Uhler, 1893

Species of true bug

Europiella stigmosa is a species of plant bug in the family Miridae. It is found in Central America and North America.
