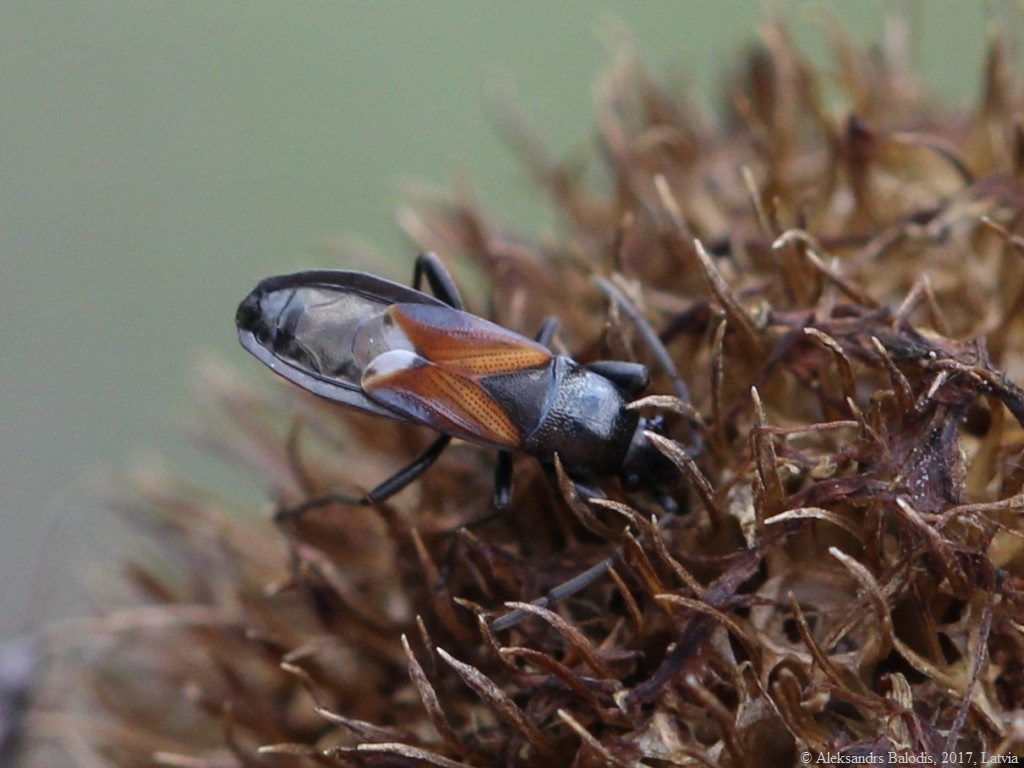
- Pterotmetus staphyliniformis

Scientific classification
- Kingdom: Animalia
- Phylum: Arthropoda
- Clade: Pancrustacea
- Class: Insecta
- Order: Hemiptera
- Suborder: Heteroptera
- Superfamily: Lygaeoidea
- Family: Rhyparochromidae
- Genus: Pterotmetus
- Species: P. staphyliniformis

Binomial name
- Pterotmetus staphyliniformis (Schilling, 1829)

= Pterotmetus staphyliniformis =

Species of dirt-colored seed bug

Pterotmetus staphyliniformis is a species of dirt-colored seed bug in the family Rhyparochromidae, found in the Palearctic.

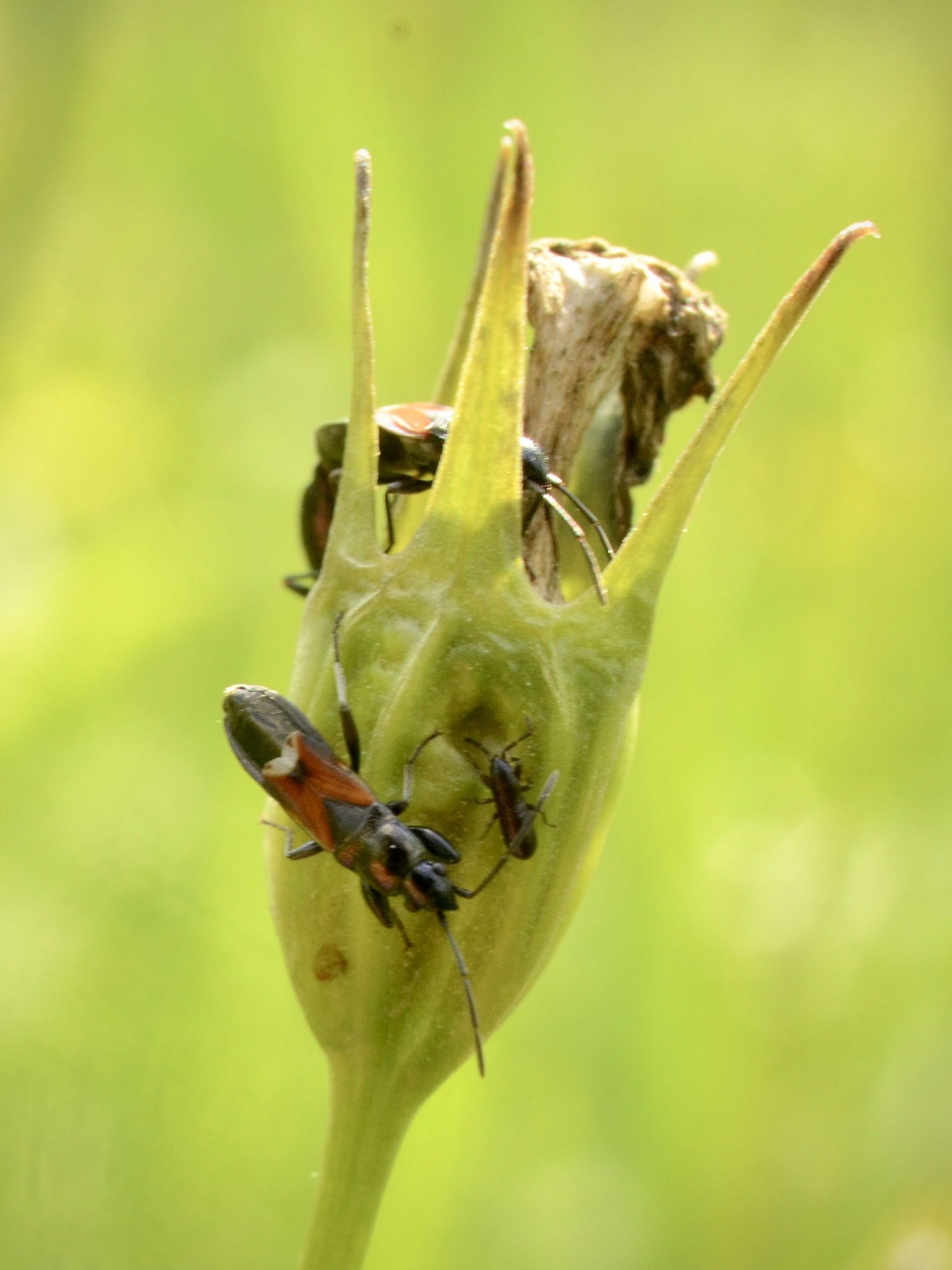
Pterotmetus staphyliniformis, Ukraine
