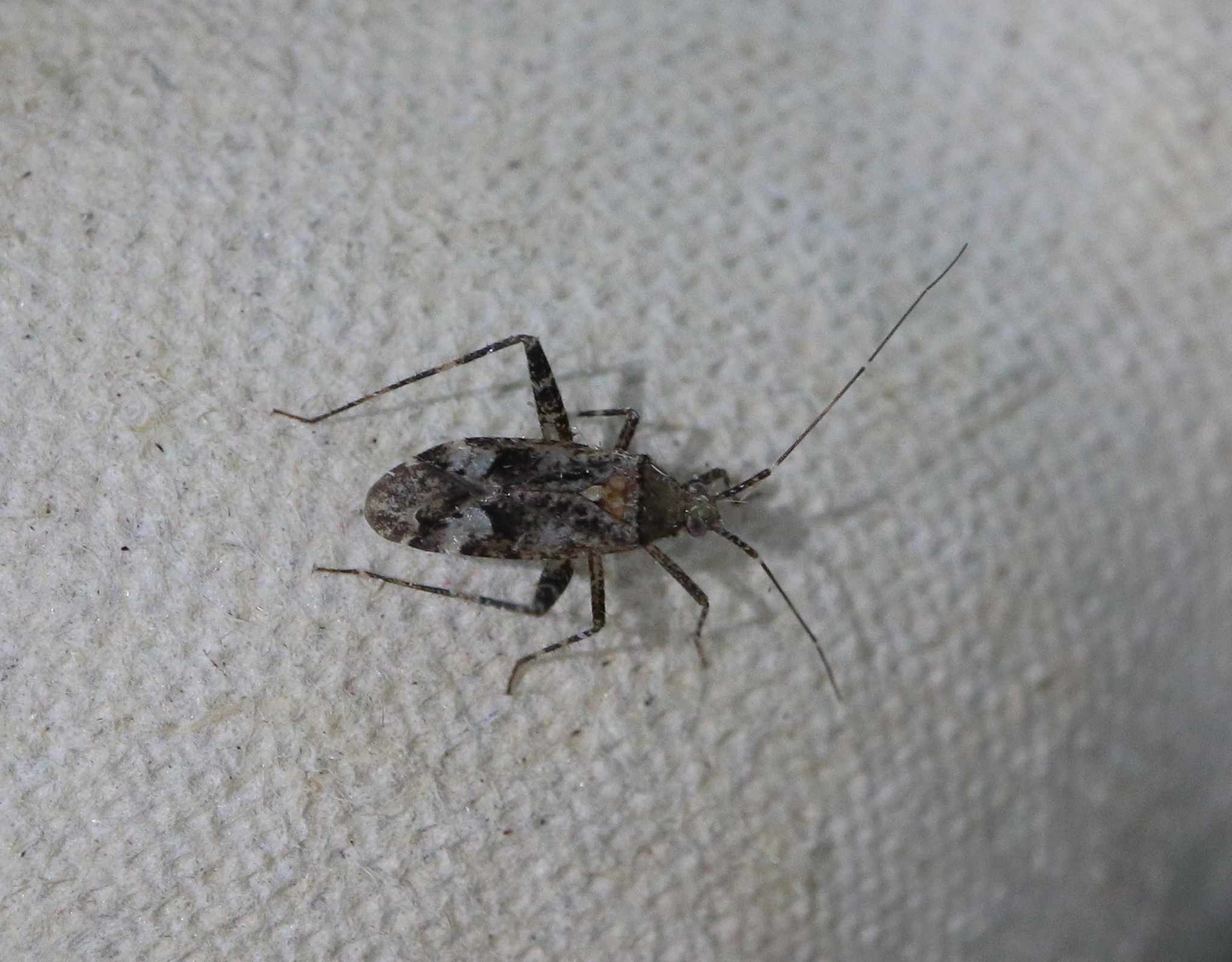
- Phytocoris pini, Suomi / Finland

Scientific classification
- Kingdom: Animalia
- Phylum: Arthropoda
- Class: Insecta
- Order: Hemiptera
- Suborder: Heteroptera
- Family: Miridae
- Genus: Phytocoris
- Species: P. pini

Binomial name
- Phytocoris pini Kirschbaum, 1856

= Phytocoris pini =

Species of true bug

Phytocoris pini is a species of plant bugs belonging to the family Miridae, subfamily Mirinae. It is absent from Azores, Canary Islands, Cyprus, Faroe Islands, Iceland, Ireland, and Portugal.
