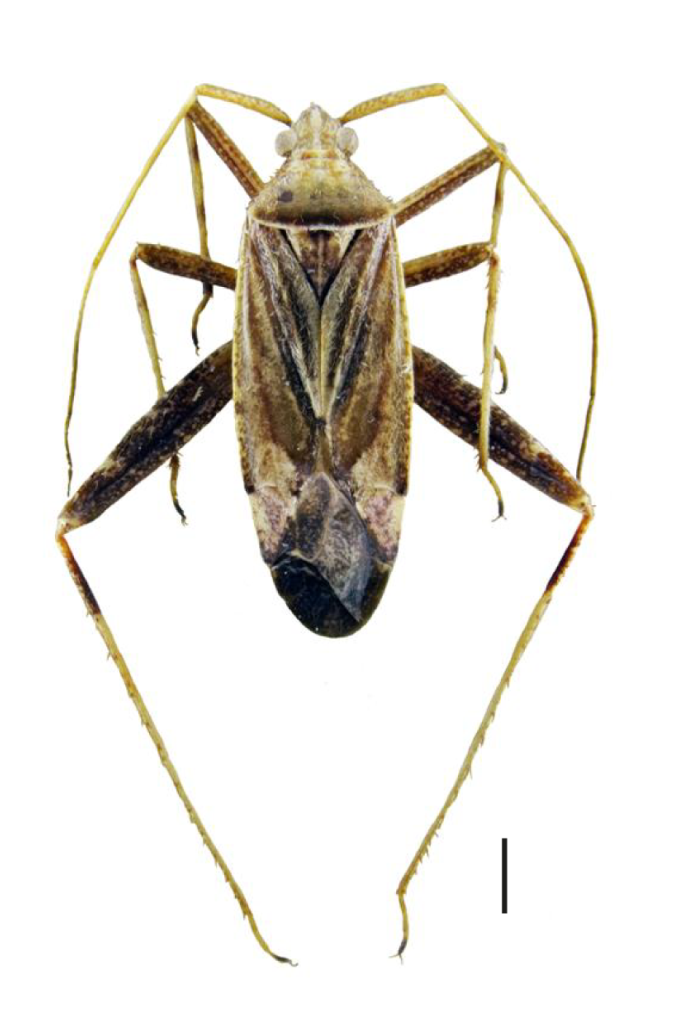

Scientific classification
- Kingdom: Animalia
- Phylum: Arthropoda
- Clade: Pancrustacea
- Class: Insecta
- Order: Hemiptera
- Suborder: Heteroptera
- Family: Miridae
- Genus: Phytocoris
- Species: P. varipes

Binomial name
- Phytocoris varipes Boheman, 1852

= Phytocoris varipes =

Species of true bug

Phytocoris varipes is a species of plant bugs belonging to the family Miridae, subfamily Mirinae.

== Description ==
The species is pinkish-brown to red-brown in colour. and have longitudinal markings on its upper surface.

== Distribution ==
Europe but it is mainly absent from Andorra, Azores, Canary Islands, Cyprus, Faroe Islands, Finland, Iceland, Latvia, Liechtenstein, Lithuania, Madeira, Malta, Poland, and central and southern part of Russia. then east to the Caucasus and Iran. It is present in the U.S.A. (Oregon) as an adventive species.

== Biology ==
Adults and nymphs live on various herbaceous plants and grasses and suck especially on the flowers and immature fruits. They are zoophytophagous, possibly predominantly phytophagous. Potential host plants include various daisy family (Asteraceae) such as Achillea, Centaurea, Matricaria and Artemisia, legumes (Fabaceae) such as Trifolium, Ononis, Lathyrus, Cytisus scoparius and also Rumex from the family Polygonaceae, Galium (Rubiaceae) (Poaceae) including Phleum and Bromus . Oviposition has so far been observed on the stems of Achillea millefolium . The adult bugs occur from the beginning of June. Mating and oviposition occurs in July and August, and the imagos die off in October.
