= Brachysteles =

Scientific classification
- Kingdom: Animalia
- Phylum: Arthropoda
- Clade: Pancrustacea
- Class: Insecta
- Order: Hemiptera
- Suborder: Heteroptera
- Family: Anthocoridae
- Tribe: Dufouriellini
- Genus: Brachysteles; Mulsant & Rey, 1852

Genus of true bugs

Brachysteles is a genus of minute pirate bugs in the family Anthocoridae. There are at least three described species in Brachysteles.

== Species ==
These three species belong to the genus Brachysteles:

- Brachysteles espagnoli Ribes, 1984^{g}
- Brachysteles parvicornis (Costa, 1847)^{i c g b}
- Brachysteles wollastoni Buchanan White, 1879^{g}

Data sources: i = ITIS, c = Catalogue of Life, g = GBIF, b = Bugguide.net
