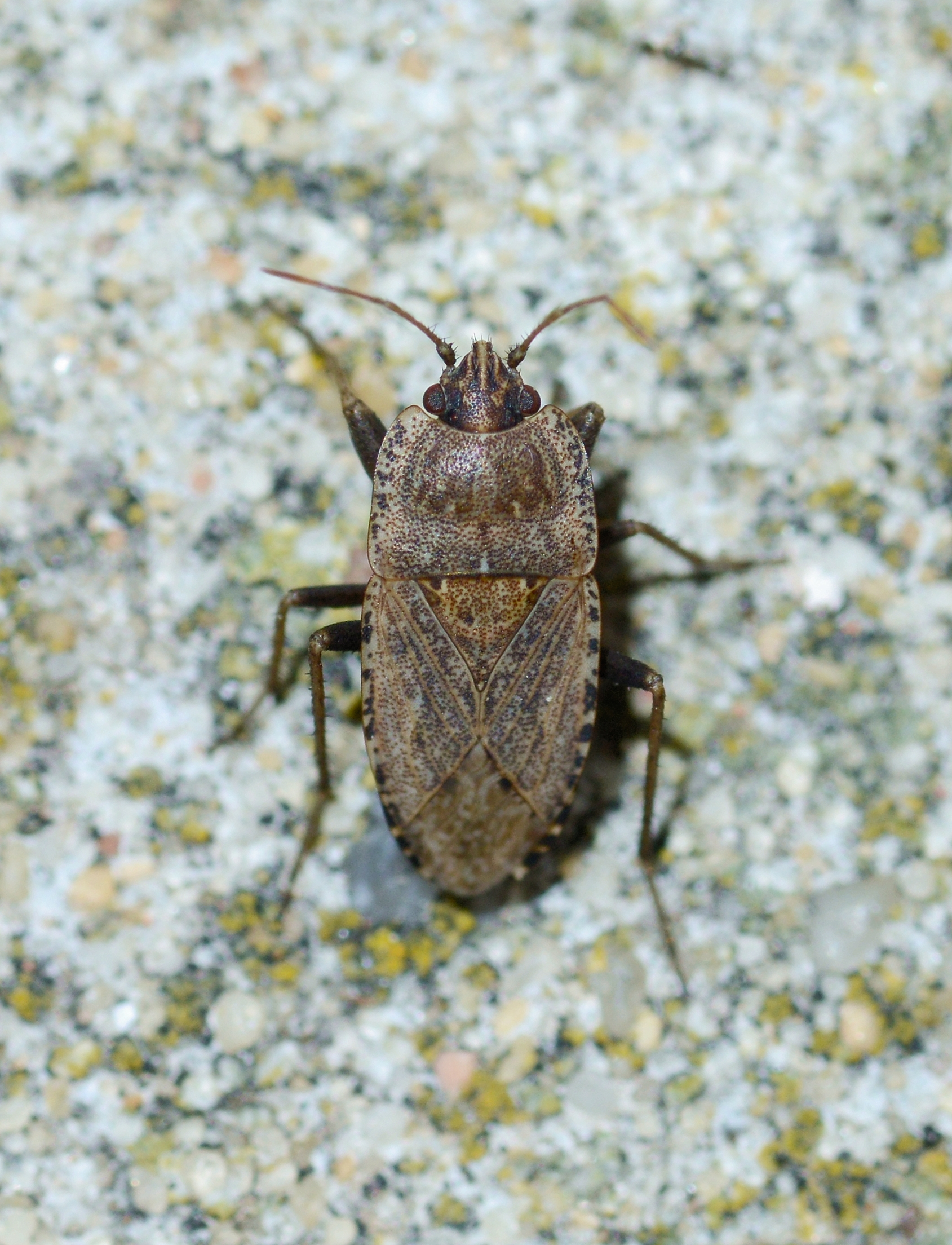

Scientific classification
- Kingdom: Animalia
- Phylum: Arthropoda
- Class: Insecta
- Order: Hemiptera
- Suborder: Heteroptera
- Family: Rhyparochromidae
- Subfamily: Rhyparochrominae
- Tribe: Gonianotini
- Genus: Emblethis; Fieber, 1861

= Emblethis =

Genus of true bugs

Emblethis is a genus of dirt-colored seed bugs in the family Rhyparochromidae. There are more than 30 described species in Emblethis.

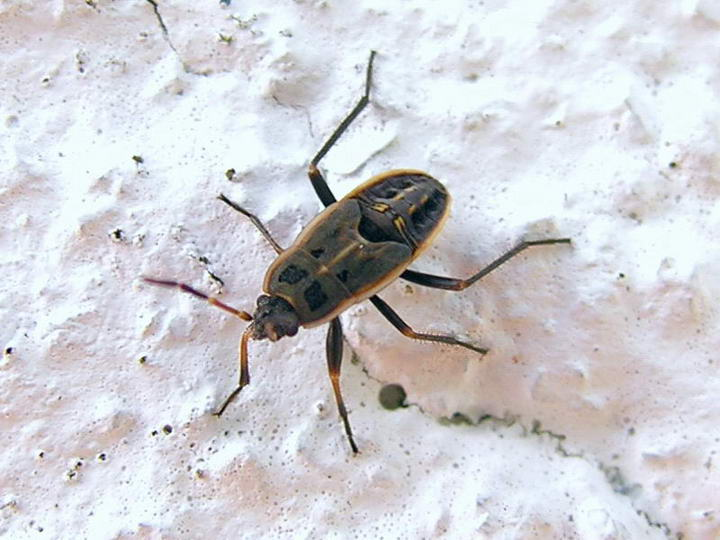

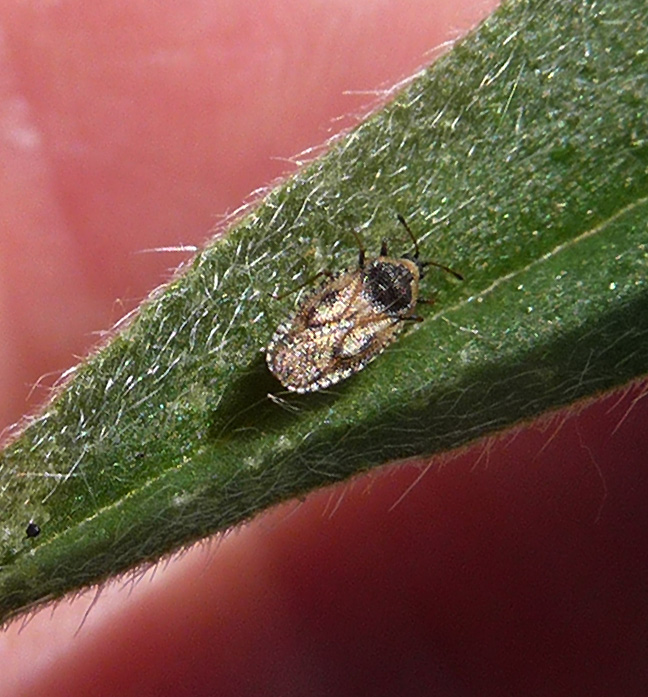

== Species ==
These 32 species belong to the genus Emblethis:

- Emblethis amplus Seidenstucker, 1987
- Emblethis angustus Montandon, 1890
- Emblethis brachynotus Horvath, 1897
- Emblethis brachypterus Linnavuori, 1953
- Emblethis brevicornis Horvath, 1904
- Emblethis ciliatus Horvath, 1875
- Emblethis denticollis Horvath, 1878
- Emblethis dilaticollis (Jakovlev, 1874)
- Emblethis duplicatus Seidenstucker, 1963
- Emblethis filicornis Linnavuori, 1954
- Emblethis gracilicornis Puton, 1883
- Emblethis griseus (Wolff, 1802)
- Emblethis horvathiana Hutchinson, 1934
- Emblethis karamanus Seidenstucker, 1963
- Emblethis latus Seidenstucker, 1966
- Emblethis luridus Jakovlev, 1904
- Emblethis major Montandon, 1890
- Emblethis minutus Kiritshenko, 1911
- Emblethis nigricans Popov, 1964
- Emblethis nox Kiritshenko, 1912
- Emblethis osmanus Seidenstucker, 1963
- Emblethis parvus Montandon, 1890
- Emblethis persicus Josifov, 1965
- Emblethis proximus Seidenstucker, 1967
- Emblethis pusillus Priesner & Alfieri, 1953
- Emblethis robustus Josifov, 1965
- Emblethis sabulosus Seidenstucker, 1963
- Emblethis semenovi Kiritshenko, 1911
- Emblethis setifer Seidenstucker, 1966
- Emblethis solitarius Jakovlev, 1881
- Emblethis verbasci (Fabricius, 1803)
- Emblethis vicarius Horvath, 1908 (sand bug)
