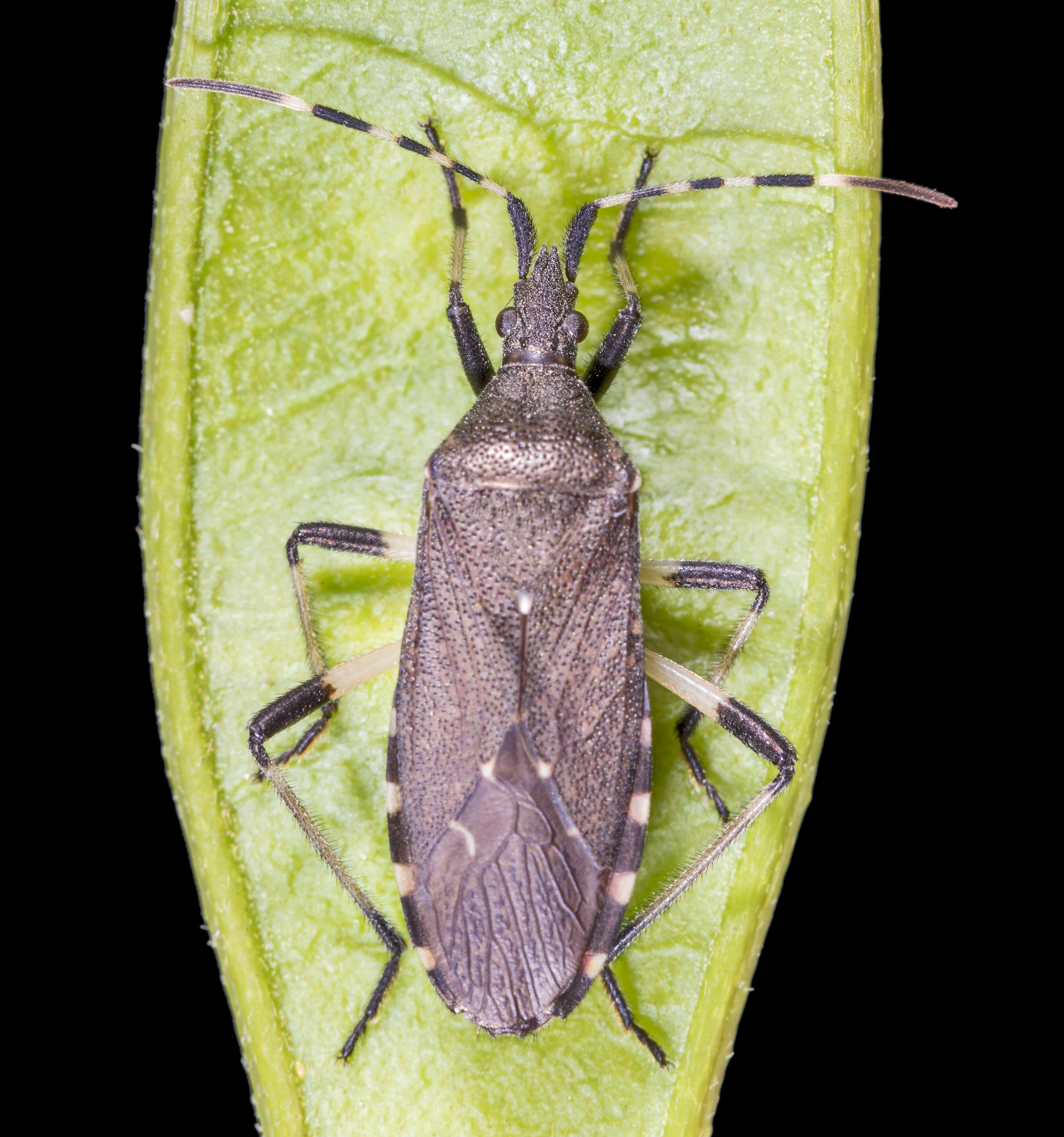
- Dicranocephalus albipes

Scientific classification
- Kingdom: Animalia
- Phylum: Arthropoda
- Class: Insecta
- Order: Hemiptera
- Suborder: Heteroptera
- Family: Stenocephalidae
- Genus: Dicranocephalus; Hahn, 1826

= Dicranocephalus =

Genus of insects (type of true bugs)

Dicranocephalus is the sole genus of true bugs in the family Stenocephalidae. There are about 30 described species in the genus Dicranocephalus.

== Species ==
These 30 species belong to the genus Dicranocephalus:

- Dicranocephalus agilis (Scopoli, 1763)
- Dicranocephalus albipes (Fabricius, 1781)
- Dicranocephalus alticolus (Zheng, 1981)
- Dicranocephalus aroonanus Brailovsky, Barrera, Göllner-Scheiding & Cassis, 2001
- Dicranocephalus brevinotum (Lindberg, 1935)
- Dicranocephalus caffer (Dallas, 1852)
- Dicranocephalus femoralis (Reuter, 1888)
- Dicranocephalus ferganensis (Horváth, 1887)
- Dicranocephalus ganziensis Ren, 1990
- Dicranocephalus haoussa (Villiers, 1950)
- Dicranocephalus hirsutus Moulet, 1993
- Dicranocephalus insularis (Dallas, 1852)
- Dicranocephalus kashmiriensis Lansbury, 1966
- Dicranocephalus lateralis (Signoret, 1879)
- Dicranocephalus lautipes (Stål, 1860)
- Dicranocephalus marginatus (Ferrari, 1874)
- Dicranocephalus marginicollis (Puton, 1881)
- Dicranocephalus medius (Mulsant & Rey, 1870)
- Dicranocephalus mucronifer (Stål, 1860)
- Dicranocephalus pallidus (Signoret, 1879)
- Dicranocephalus panelii Lindberg, 1959
- Dicranocephalus pilosus (Bergroth, 1912)
- Dicranocephalus prolixus Lansbury, 1965
- Dicranocephalus pseudotestaceus Lansbury, 1966
- Dicranocephalus punctarius (Stål, 1866)
- Dicranocephalus punctipes (Stål, 1873)
- Dicranocephalus putoni (Horváth, 1897)
- Dicranocephalus schmitzi Göllner-Scheiding, 1996
- Dicranocephalus setulosus (Ferrari, 1874)
- Dicranocephalus testaceus (Stål, 1860)

== Bibliography ==
- R. T. Schuh, J. A. Slater: True Bugs of the World (Hemiptera: Heteroptera). Classification and Natural History. Cornell University Press, Ithaca, New York 1995.
