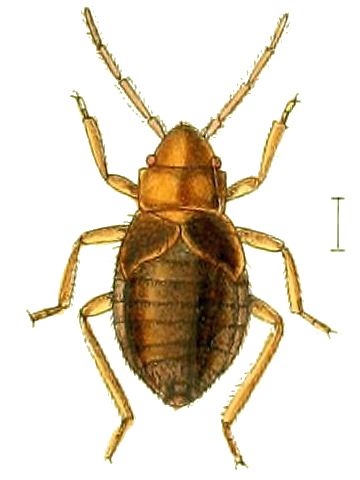
- Aepophilus bonnairei

Scientific classification
- Kingdom: Animalia
- Phylum: Arthropoda
- Clade: Pancrustacea
- Class: Insecta
- Order: Hemiptera
- Suborder: Heteroptera
- Infraorder: Leptopodomorpha
- Family: Aepophilidae; Puton, 1879
- Subfamily: Aepophilinae; Puton, 1879
- Genus: Aepophilus; Signoret, 1879
- Species: A. bonnairei

Binomial name
- Aepophilus bonnairei Signoret, 1879

= Aepophilus =

Genus of bugs

Aepophilus is a monotypic genus of bugs, containing the species Aepophilus bonnairei: in the monogeneric subfamily Aepophilinae and monogeneric family Aepophilidae, of the infraorder Leptopodomorpha. It is found on the Atlantic coasts of Europe; the name derives from Greek αἰπός, 'steep', thus, "lover of steep places."

== Distribution ==
The species lives on the coasts of Ireland, southwest England and Wales, the Netherlands, the North of France's Atlantic and Channel coasts, the Atlantic coasts of Spain and Portugal, with an uncertain record from Morocco.

== Ecology ==
Aepophilus bonnairei lives exclusively in the intertidal zone of the sea coast, often in between thalli of Fucus. It is small (length 2.5-3.5 mm) and found in cracks and crevices of rocky coasts as well as under stones embedded in sand or silt. This insect is a predator and has been observed feeding on annelids, with its sucking mouthparts, in the field and in the laboratory. The life cycle of the species has been poorly researched. Larval stages were kept in the laboratory for several months, so it probably has a relatively slow development. There are reports that the females guard egg clutches.
