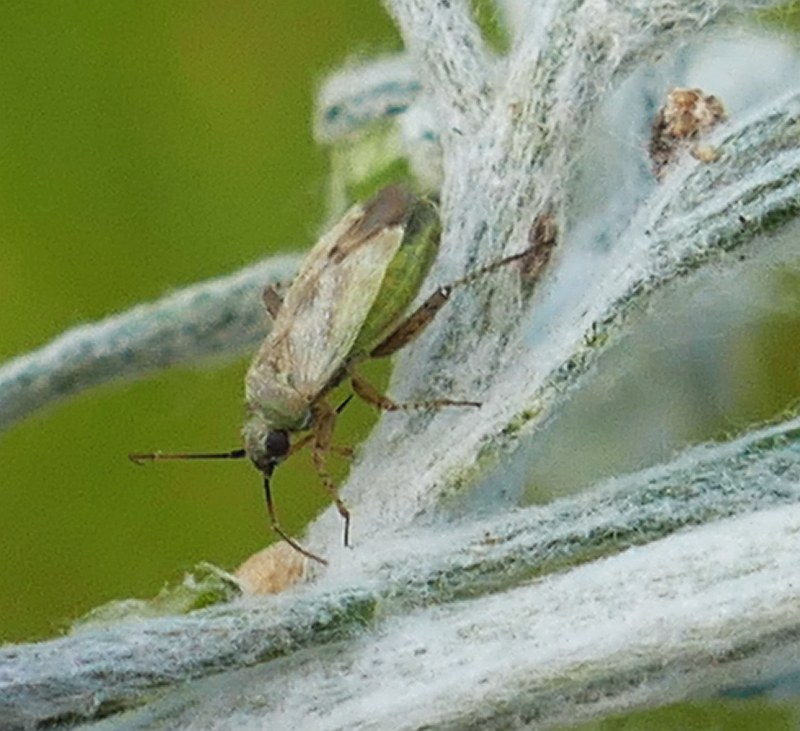

Scientific classification
- Kingdom: Animalia
- Phylum: Arthropoda
- Class: Insecta
- Order: Hemiptera
- Suborder: Heteroptera
- Family: Miridae
- Subfamily: Phylinae
- Tribe: Phylini
- Genus: Europiella
- Species: E. decolor

Binomial name
- Europiella decolor (Uhler, 1893)

Synonyms
- Agalliastes fumidus Uhler, 1895; Plagiognathus apiatus (Uhler, 1895)

= Europiella decolor =

Species of true bug

Europiella decolor is a species of plant bug in the family Miridae. It is found in Central America, North America, and Europe.
