= Lopus decolor =

Scientific classification
- Domain: Eukaryota
- Kingdom: Animalia
- Phylum: Arthropoda
- Class: Insecta
- Order: Hemiptera
- Suborder: Heteroptera
- Family: Miridae
- Tribe: Cremnorrhinini
- Genus: Lopus
- Species: L. decolor

Binomial name
- Lopus decolor (Fallén, 1807)

Synonyms
- Lopus chrysanthemi Hahn, 1831

Species of true bug

Lopus decolor is a species of plant bug in the family Miridae. It is found in Africa, Europe and Northern Asia (excluding China), North America, and New Zealand.
