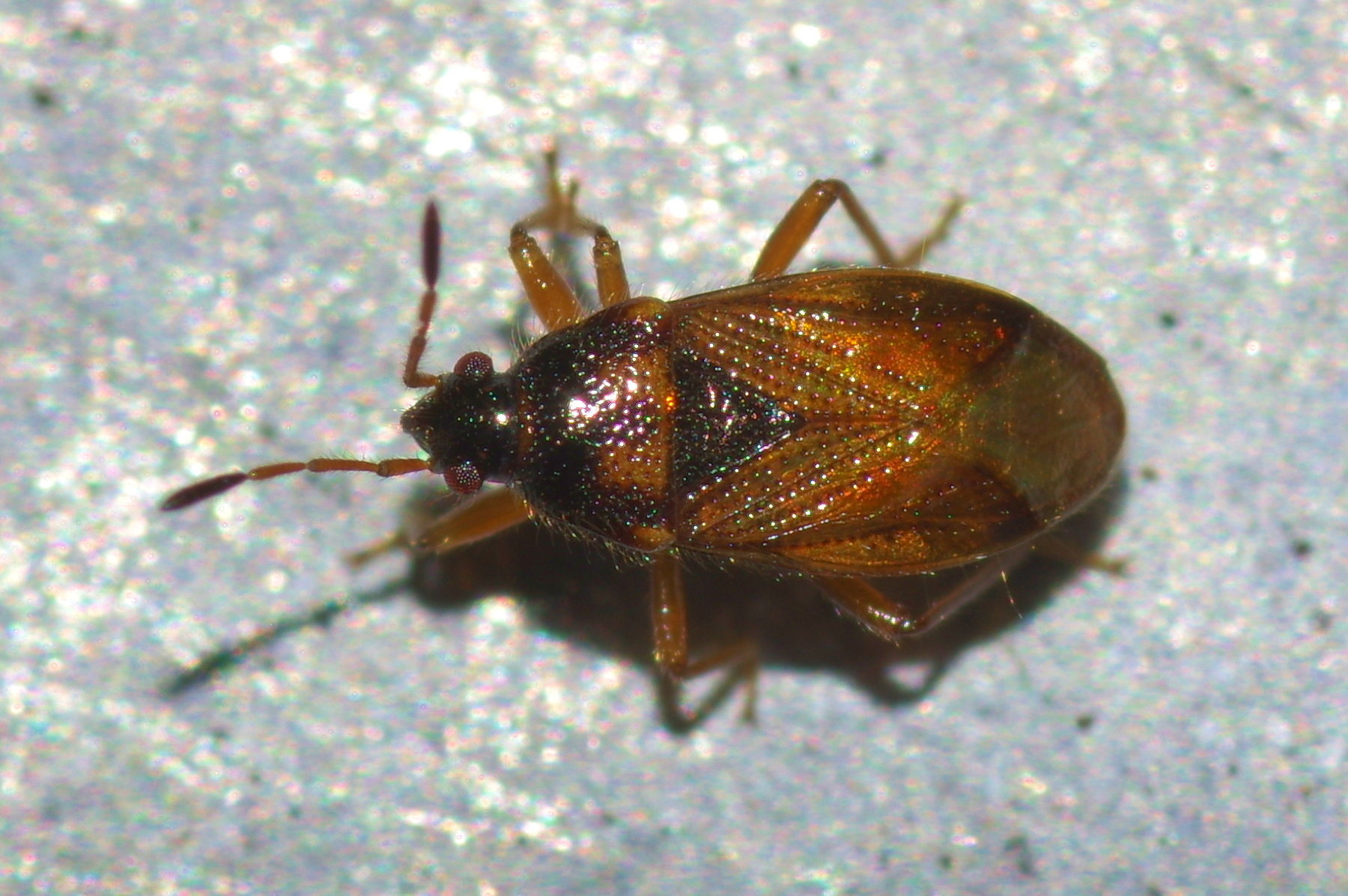
- Lasiosomus enervis

Scientific classification
- Kingdom: Animalia
- Phylum: Arthropoda
- Clade: Pancrustacea
- Class: Insecta
- Order: Hemiptera
- Suborder: Heteroptera
- Family: Rhyparochromidae
- Genus: Lasiosomus
- Species: L. enervis

Binomial name
- Lasiosomus enervis (Herrich-Schäffer, 1835)

= Lasiosomus enervis =

Species of true bug

Lasiosomus enervis is a species of true bug belonging to the family Rhyparochromidae.

It is native to Europe.
