= Brachysteles parvicornis =

Scientific classification
- Domain: Eukaryota
- Kingdom: Animalia
- Phylum: Arthropoda
- Class: Insecta
- Order: Hemiptera
- Suborder: Heteroptera
- Family: Anthocoridae
- Genus: Brachysteles
- Species: B. parvicornis

Binomial name
- Brachysteles parvicornis (Costa, 1847)

Species of true bug

Brachysteles parvicornis is a species of bugs in the family Anthocoridae. It is found in Africa, Europe and Northern Asia (excluding China), and North America.
