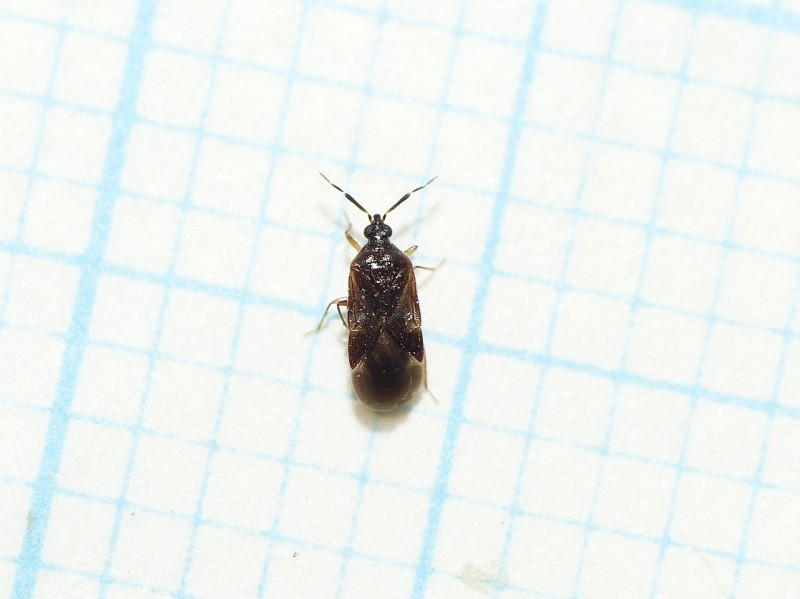

Scientific classification
- Domain: Eukaryota
- Kingdom: Animalia
- Phylum: Arthropoda
- Class: Insecta
- Order: Hemiptera
- Suborder: Heteroptera
- Family: Anthocoridae
- Genus: Buchananiella
- Species: B. continua

Binomial name
- Buchananiella continua (White, 1879)

Synonyms
- Cardiastethus cavicollis Blatchley, 1934

= Buchananiella continua =

Species of true bug

Buchananiella continua is a species of bugs in the family Anthocoridae. It is found in Africa, Europe and Northern Asia (excluding China), North America, Oceania, and South America.

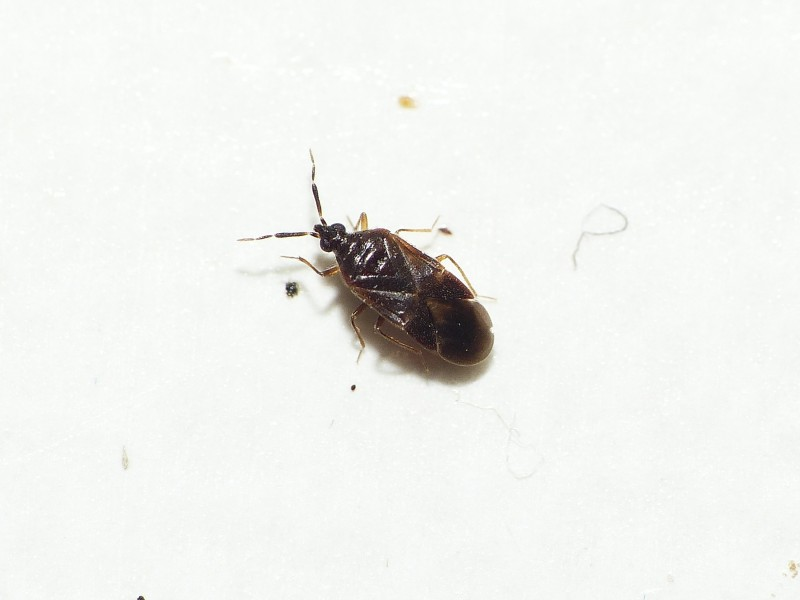
