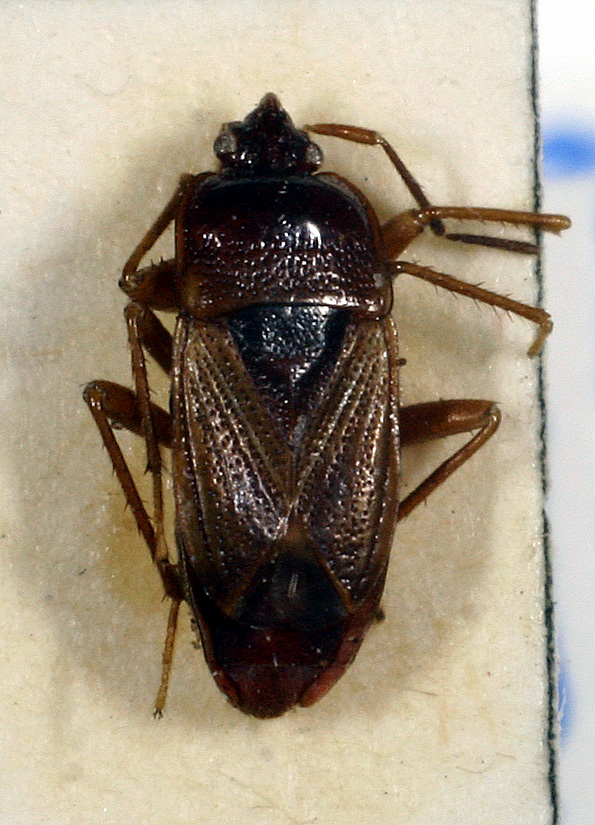

Scientific classification
- Kingdom: Animalia
- Phylum: Arthropoda
- Clade: Pancrustacea
- Class: Insecta
- Order: Hemiptera
- Suborder: Heteroptera
- Family: Rhyparochromidae
- Genus: Lamproplax
- Species: L. picea

Binomial name
- Lamproplax picea (Flor, 1860)

= Lamproplax picea =

Species of true bug

Lamproplax picea is a species of true bug belonging to the family Rhyparochromidae.

It is native to Northern Europe.
