= Acetropis gimmerthalii =

Scientific classification
- Kingdom: Animalia
- Phylum: Arthropoda
- Class: Insecta
- Order: Hemiptera
- Suborder: Heteroptera
- Family: Miridae
- Genus: Acetropis
- Species: A. gimmerthalii

Binomial name
- Acetropis gimmerthalii Wagner, 1968

Species of true bug

Acetropis gimmerthalii is a species of true bug in the family Miridae.

== Description ==
Adults are 5–6 millimetres (0.20–0.24 in) long.

== Ecology ==
The species are active from June to September, and can be found in various dry and damp grasslands.
