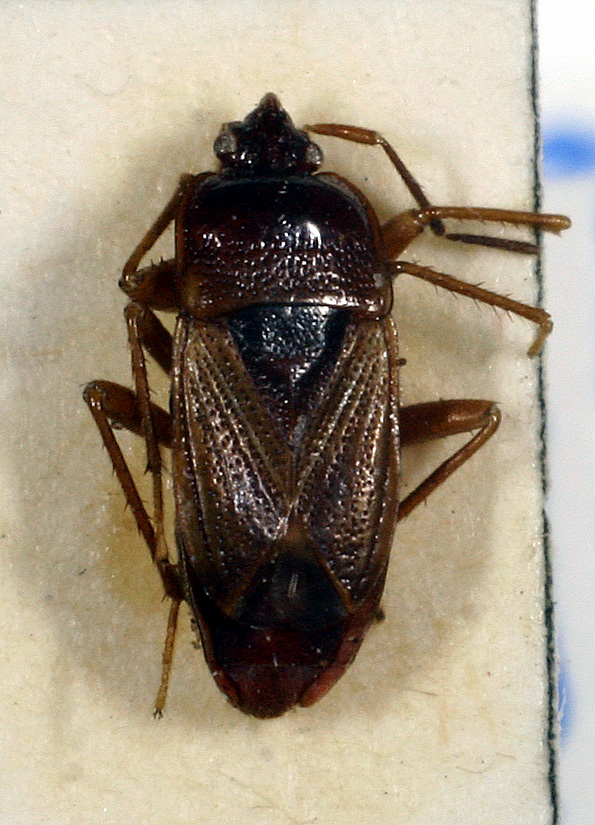
- Lamproplax picea

Scientific classification
- Kingdom: Animalia
- Phylum: Arthropoda
- Class: Insecta
- Order: Hemiptera
- Suborder: Heteroptera
- Family: Rhyparochromidae
- Tribe: Drymini
- Genus: Lamproplax; Douglas & Scott, 1868

= Lamproplax =

Genus of true bugs

Lamproplax is a genus of true bugs belonging to the family Rhyparochromidae.

The species of this genus are found in Europe.

Species:

- Lamproplax majuscula Kerzhner, 1977
- Lamproplax membranea Distant, 1883
- Lamproplax picea (Flor, 1860)
- Lamproplax unispina Kerzhner, 1977
