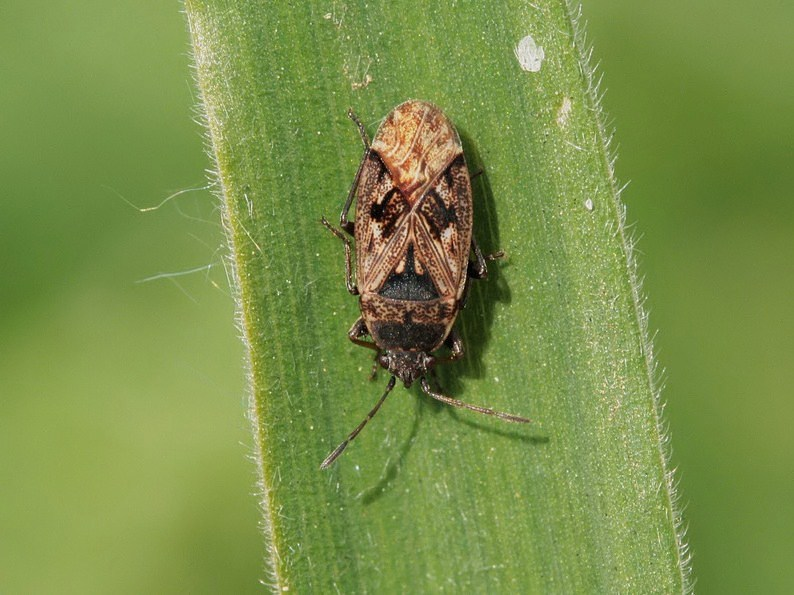
- Sphragisticus nebulosus

Scientific classification
- Kingdom: Animalia
- Phylum: Arthropoda
- Class: Insecta
- Order: Hemiptera
- Suborder: Heteroptera
- Family: Rhyparochromidae
- Tribe: Megalonotini
- Genus: Sphragisticus; Stal, 1872
- Species: S. nebulosus

Binomial name
- Sphragisticus nebulosus (Fallen, 1807)

= Sphragisticus =

Genus of true bugs

Sphragisticus is a genus of dirt-colored seed bugs in the family Rhyparochromidae. There is one described species in Sphragisticus, S. nebulosus.
