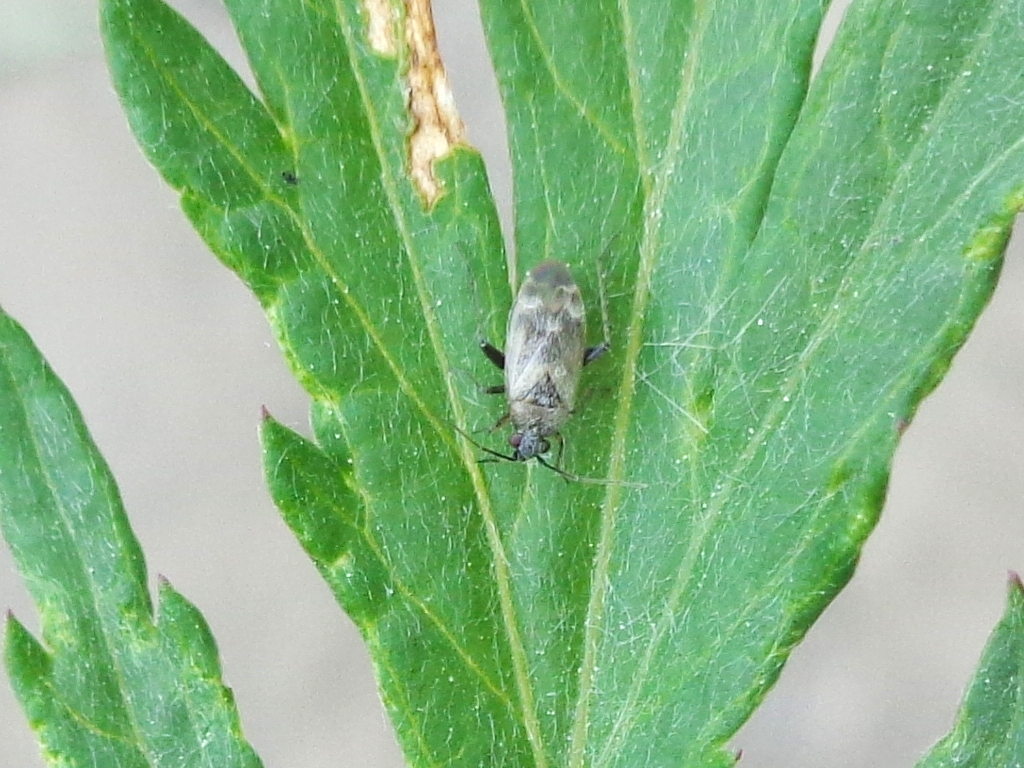
- Europiella artemisiae

Scientific classification
- Kingdom: Animalia
- Phylum: Arthropoda
- Clade: Pancrustacea
- Class: Insecta
- Order: Hemiptera
- Suborder: Heteroptera
- Family: Miridae
- Subfamily: Phylinae
- Tribe: Phylini
- Genus: Europiella; Reuter, 1909

= Europiella =

Genus of true bugs

Europiella is a genus of plant bugs in the family Miridae. There are more than 30 described species in Europiella.

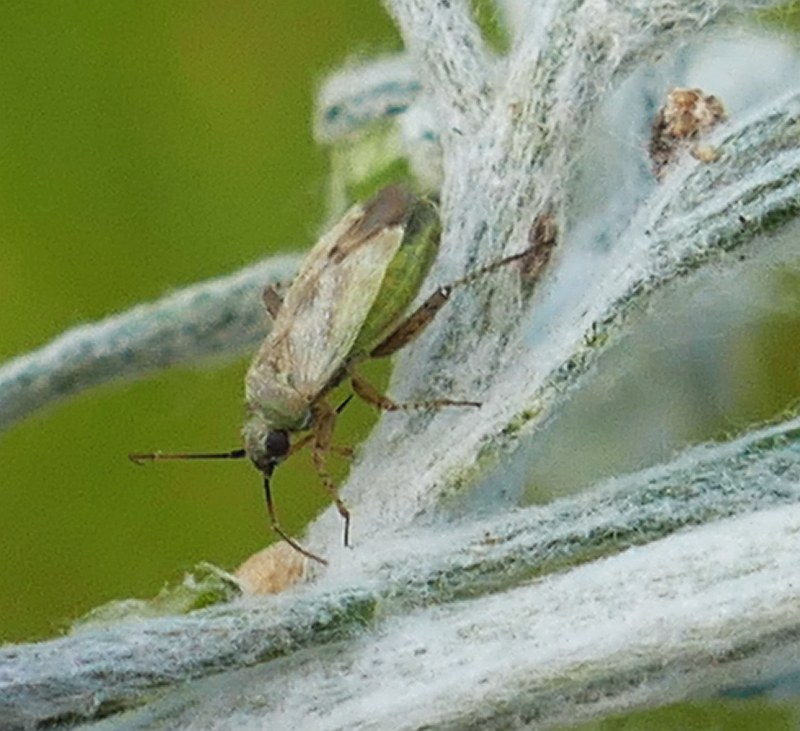
Europiella decolor

== Species ==
These 38 species belong to the genus Europiella:

- Europiella albipennis (Fallén, 1829)
- Europiella alpina (Reuter, 1875)
- Europiella angulata (Uhler, 1895)
- Europiella arizonae Knight, 1968
- Europiella artemisiae (Becker, 1864)
- Europiella bakeri (Bergroth, 1898)
- Europiella canoflavida (Qi & Nonnaizab, 1993)
- Europiella carvalhoi Schuh in Schuh, Lindskog & Kerzhner, 1995
- Europiella concinna Reuter, 1909
- Europiella consors (Uhler, 1895)
- Europiella decolor (Uhler, 1893)
- Europiella gilva (Kulik, 1965)
- Europiella herbaalbae (Wagner, 1969)
- Europiella indochinana Duwal, Yasunaga & Lee, 2017
- Europiella kiritshenkoi (Kulik, 1975)
- Europiella langtangensis Duwal, Yasunaga & Lee, 2010
- Europiella lattini Schuh, 2004
- Europiella leucopus (Kerzhner, 1979)
- Europiella livida (Reuter, 1906)
- Europiella miyamotoi (Kerzhner, 1988)
- Europiella moesta (Reuter, 1906)
- Europiella morrisoni Schuh, 2004
- Europiella nigricornis Knight, 1968
- Europiella nigrocunealis (V.Putshkov, 1975)
- Europiella ovatula (Wagner, 1952)
- Europiella pilosula (Uhler, 1893)
- Europiella pintoi Schuh, 2004
- Europiella puspae Duwal, Yasunaga & Lee, 2010
- Europiella senjoensis (Linnavuori, 1961)
- Europiella signicornis Knight, 1969
- Europiella stigmosa (Uhler, 1893)
- Europiella strawinskii (Sienkiewicz, 1986)
- Europiella strigifemur (Wagner, 1964)
- Europiella tomentosa (Reuter, 1888)
- Europiella umbrina Reuter, 1909
- Europiella unipuncta Knight, 1968
- Europiella unipunctata Knight
- Europiella yampae Knight, 1968
