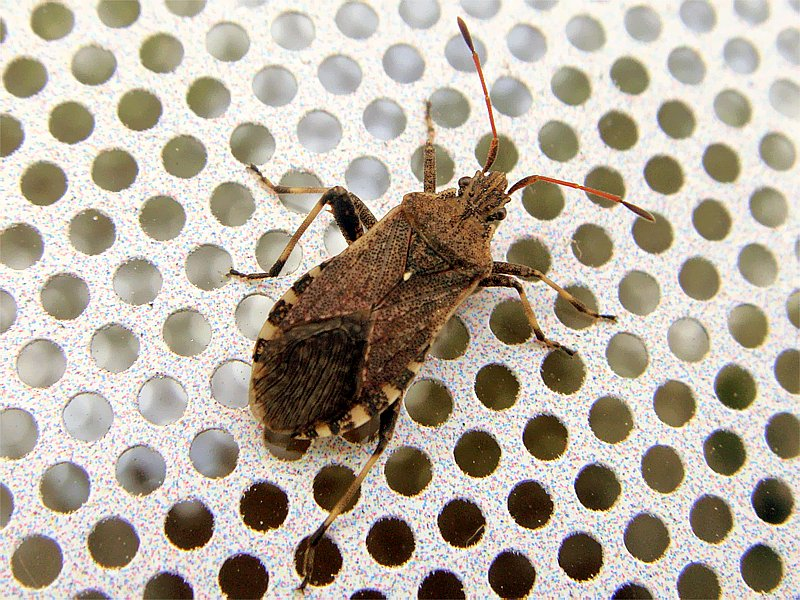

Scientific classification
- Domain: Eukaryota
- Kingdom: Animalia
- Phylum: Arthropoda
- Class: Insecta
- Order: Hemiptera
- Suborder: Heteroptera
- Family: Coreidae
- Subfamily: Pseudophloeinae
- Genus: Ceraleptus; Costa, 1847

= Ceraleptus =

Genus of true bugs

Ceraleptus is a genus of leaf-footed bugs, in the family Coreidae. There are about nine described species in Ceraleptus.

== Species ==
These nine species belong to the genus Ceraleptus:

- Ceraleptus americanus Stål, 1870
- Ceraleptus denticulatus Froeschner, 1963
- Ceraleptus gracilicornis (Herrich-Schäffer, 1835)
- Ceraleptus lividus Stein, 1858
- Ceraleptus lugens Horváth, 1898
- Ceraleptus obtusus (Brullé, 1839)
- Ceraleptus pacificus Barber, 1914
- Ceraleptus probolus Froeschner, 1963
- Ceraleptus sartus Kiritshenko, 1912
