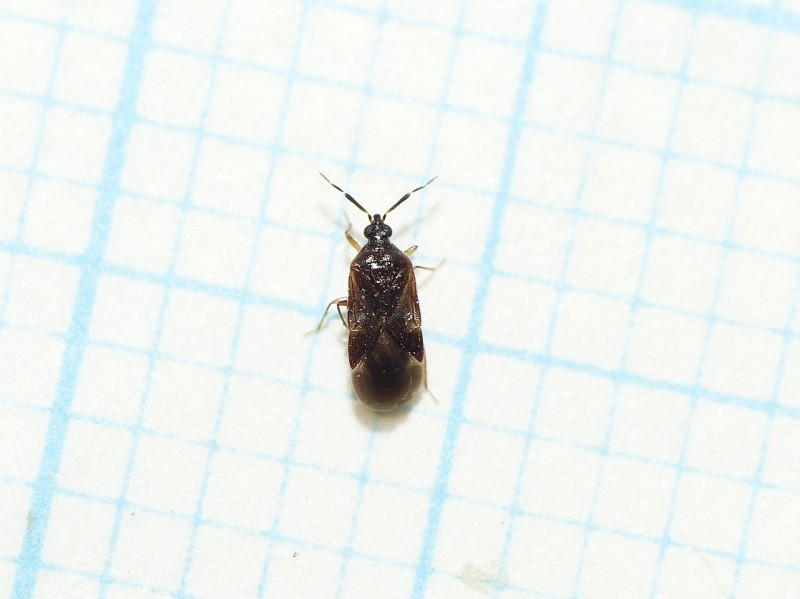
- Buchananiella continua

Scientific classification
- Kingdom: Animalia
- Phylum: Arthropoda
- Clade: Pancrustacea
- Class: Insecta
- Order: Hemiptera
- Suborder: Heteroptera
- Family: Anthocoridae
- Subfamily: Anthocorinae
- Tribe: Dufouriellini; Van Duzee, 1916

Synonyms
- Cardiastethini Carayon, 1972

= Dufouriellini =

Tribe of true bugs

Dufouriellini is a tribe of minute pirate bugs in the family Anthocoridae. There are about 7 genera and 15 described species in Dufouriellini.

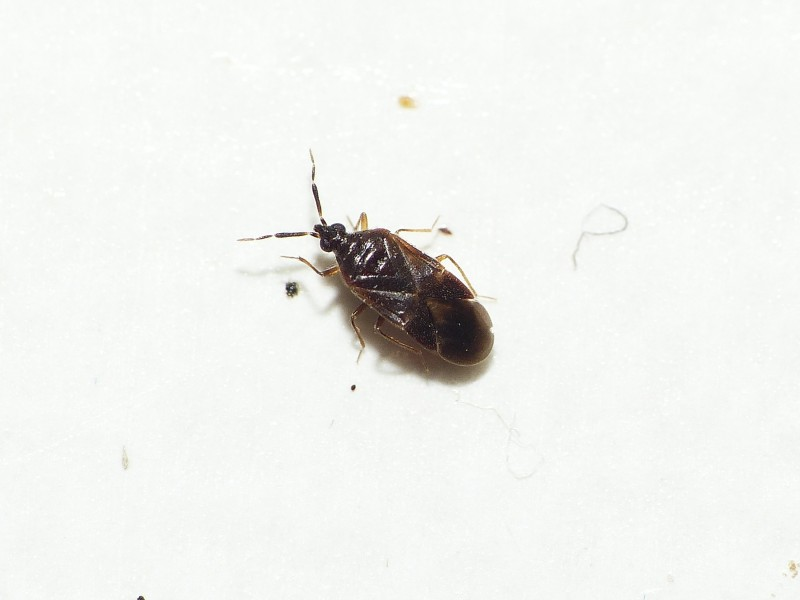
Buchananiella continua

== Genera ==
- Alofa Herring, 1976^{i c g}
- Amphiareus Distant, 1904^{i c g b}
- Brachysteles Mulsant & Rey, 1852^{i c g b}
- Buchananiella Reuter, 1884^{i c g b}
- Cardiastethus Fieber, 1860^{i c g b}
- Dufouriellus Kirkaldy, 1906^{i c g b}
- Physopleurella Reuter, 1884^{i c g b}

Data sources: i = ITIS, c = Catalogue of Life, g = GBIF, b = Bugguide.net
