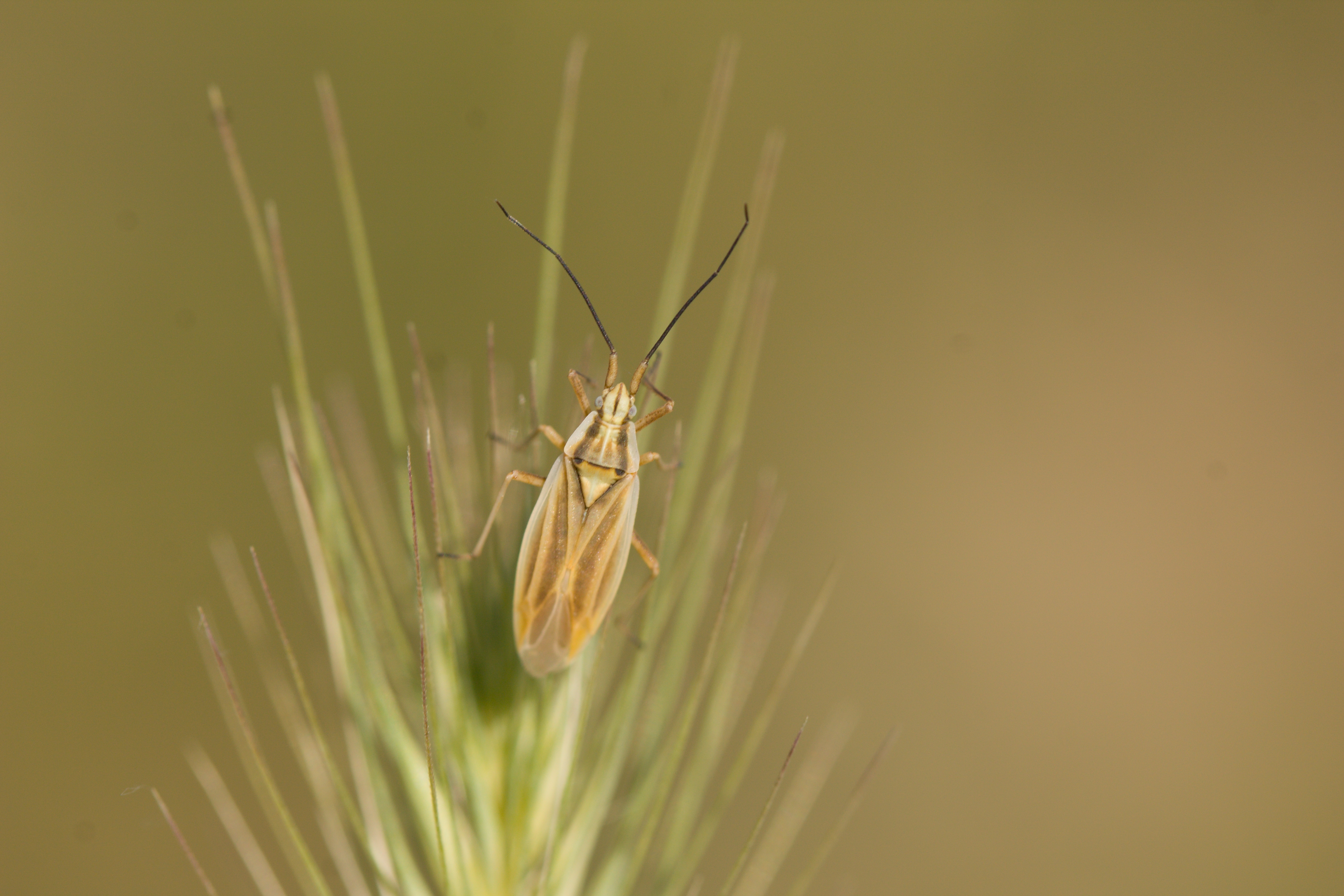

Scientific classification
- Kingdom: Animalia
- Phylum: Arthropoda
- Class: Insecta
- Order: Hemiptera
- Suborder: Heteroptera
- Family: Miridae
- Tribe: Stenodemini
- Genus: Acetropis; Fieber, 1858

Species
- Acetropis americana Knight, 1927; Acetropis carinata (Herrich-Schaeffer, 1841); Acetropis gimmerthalii Wagner, 1968

= Acetropis =

Genus of true bugs

Acetropis is a genus of true bugs.
