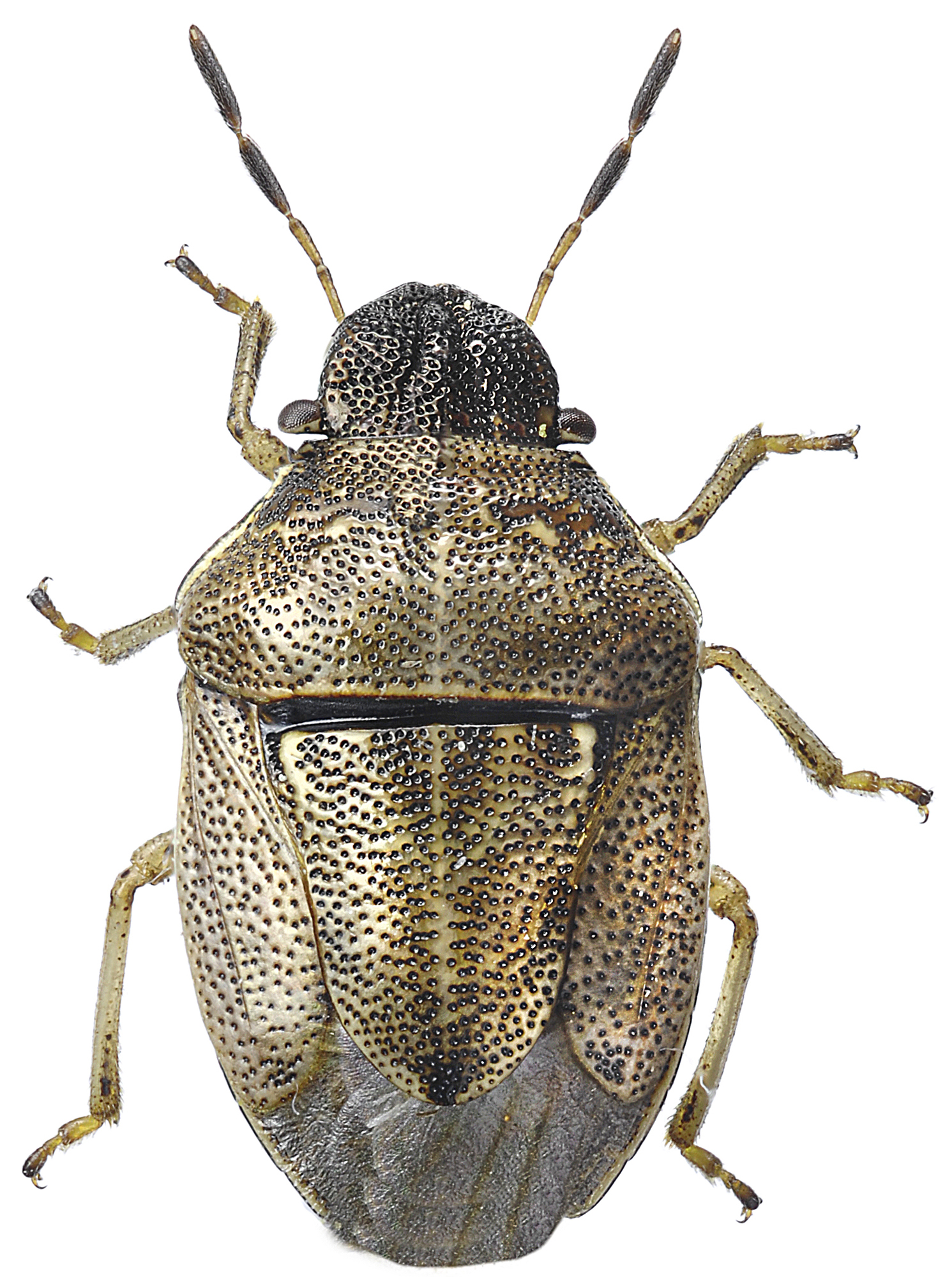
- Neottiglossa pusilla

Scientific classification
- Domain: Eukaryota
- Kingdom: Animalia
- Phylum: Arthropoda
- Class: Insecta
- Order: Hemiptera
- Suborder: Heteroptera
- Family: Pentatomidae
- Subfamily: Pentatominae
- Genus: Neottiglossa; Kirby, 1837

Subgenera
- Neottiglossa (Neottiglossa) Kirby, 1837; Neottiglossa (Texas) Kirkaldy, 1904

= Neottiglossa =

Genus of true bugs

Neottiglossa is a genus of stink bugs in the family Pentatomidae. There are about 10 described species in Neottiglossa.

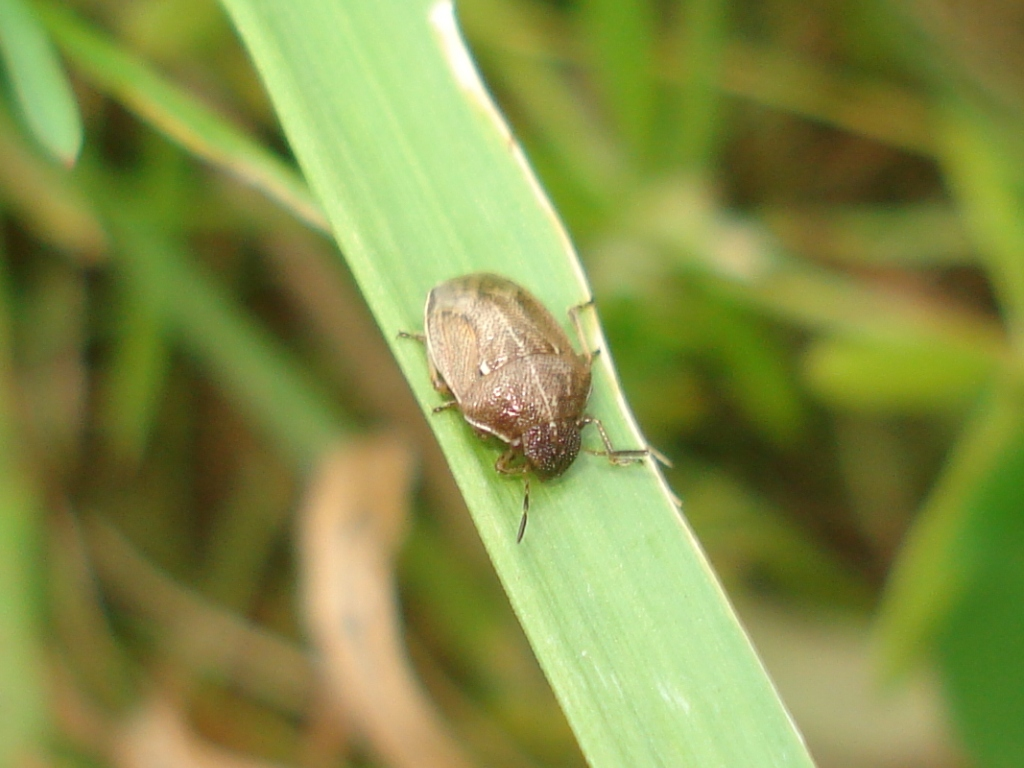
Neottiglossa pusilla

== Species ==
These 10 species belong to the genus Neottiglossa:

- Neottiglossa bifida (A.Costa, 1847)
- Neottiglossa cavifrons Stål, 1872
- Neottiglossa flavomarginata (Lucas, 1849)
- Neottiglossa leporina (Herrich-Schäffer, 1830)
- Neottiglossa lineolata (Mulsant & Rey, 1852)
- Neottiglossa pusilla (Gmelin, 1790)
- Neottiglossa sulcifrons Stål, 1872
- Neottiglossa trilineata (Kirby, 1837)
- Neottiglossa tumidifrons Downes, 1928
- Neottiglossa undata (Say, 1832)
