= Peritrechus convivus =

Scientific classification
- Domain: Eukaryota
- Kingdom: Animalia
- Phylum: Arthropoda
- Class: Insecta
- Order: Hemiptera
- Suborder: Heteroptera
- Family: Rhyparochromidae
- Tribe: Rhyparochromini
- Genus: Peritrechus
- Species: P. convivus

Binomial name
- Peritrechus convivus (Stal, 1858)

Synonyms
- Peritrechus distinguendus (Flor, 1860); Peritrechus saskatchewanensis Barber, 1918

Species of true bug

Peritrechus convivus is a species of dirt-colored seed bug in the family Rhyparochromidae. It is found in Europe and Northern Asia (excluding China), Central America, and North America.
