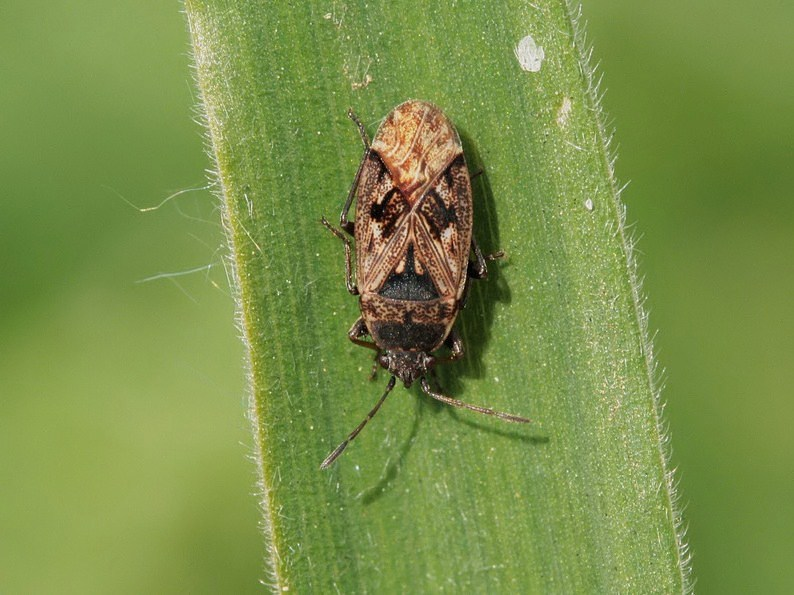
- Sphragisticus nebulosus

Scientific classification
- Kingdom: Animalia
- Phylum: Arthropoda
- Clade: Pancrustacea
- Class: Insecta
- Order: Hemiptera
- Suborder: Heteroptera
- Family: Rhyparochromidae
- Subfamily: Rhyparochrominae
- Tribe: Megalonotini
- Genus: Sphragisticus
- Species: S. nebulosus

Binomial name
- Sphragisticus nebulosus (Fallen, 1807)

= Sphragisticus nebulosus =

Species of dirt-colored seed bug

Sphragisticus nebulosus is a species of dirt-colored seed bug in the family Rhyparochromidae, found in North America, Europe, and Asia.

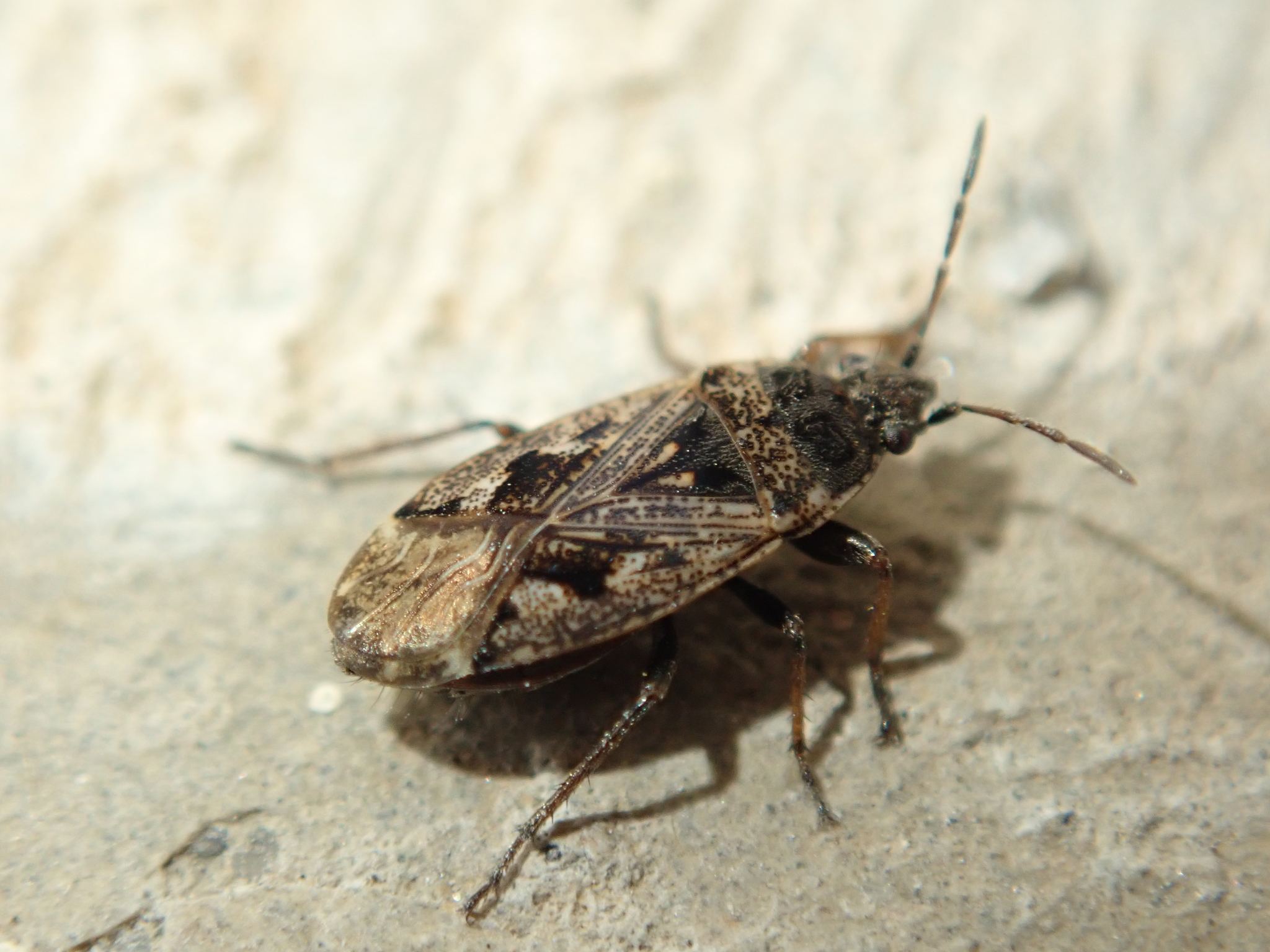
Sphragisticus nebulosus, Germany
