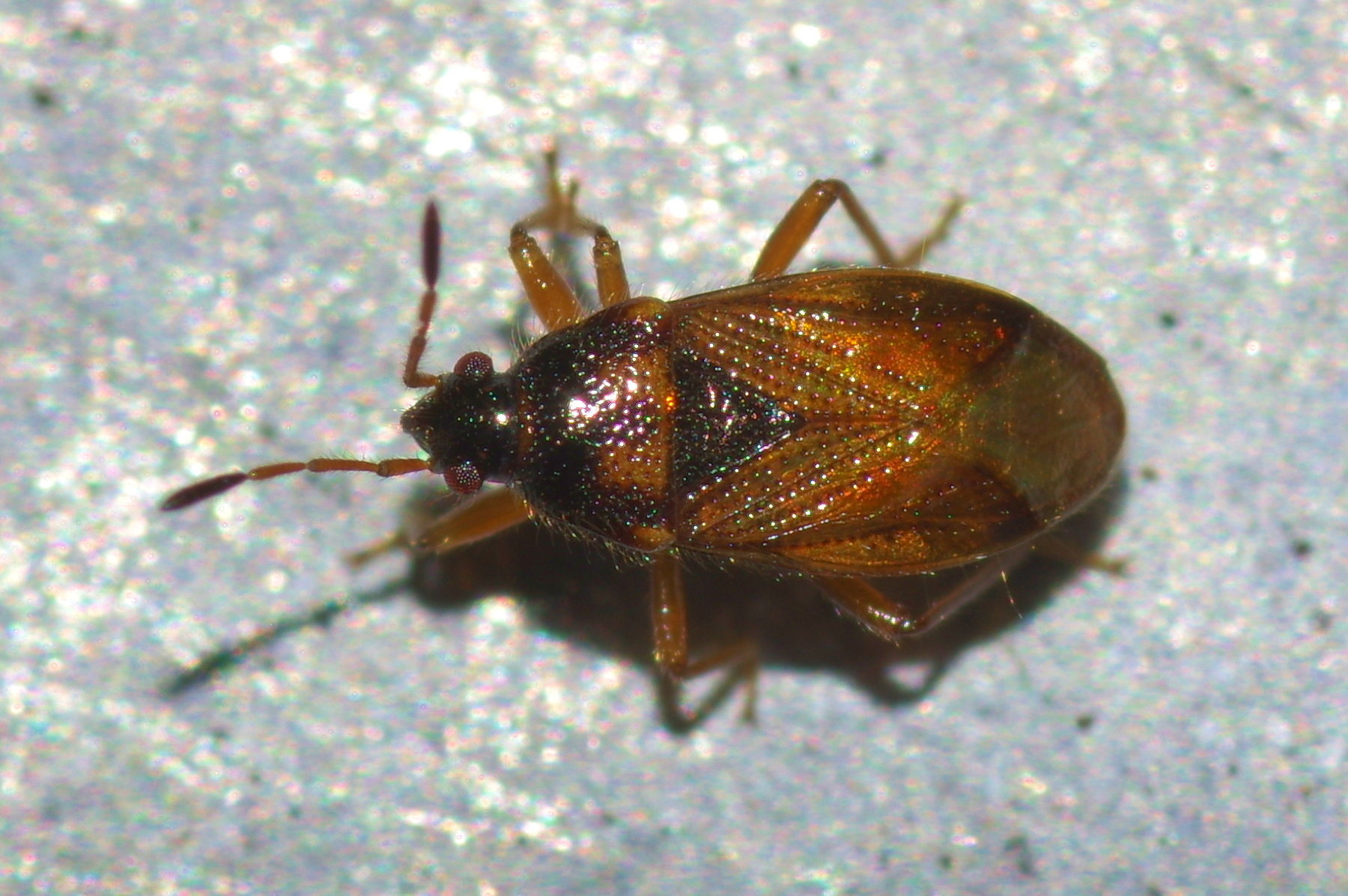
- adult Lasiosomus enervis

Scientific classification
- Kingdom: Animalia
- Phylum: Arthropoda
- Class: Insecta
- Order: Hemiptera
- Suborder: Heteroptera
- Family: Rhyparochromidae
- Genus: Lasiosomus; Fieber, 1861

= Lasiosomus =

Genus of true bugs

Lasiosomus is a genus of true bugs belonging to the family Rhyparochromidae.

The species of this genus are found in Europe.

Species:

- Lasiosomus cameroonensis O'Rourke, 1975
- Lasiosomus enervis (Herrich-Schaeffer, 1835)
