= Lopus =

Scientific classification
- Kingdom: Animalia
- Phylum: Arthropoda
- Clade: Pancrustacea
- Class: Insecta
- Order: Hemiptera
- Suborder: Heteroptera
- Family: Miridae
- Subfamily: Phylinae
- Tribe: Cremnorrhinini
- Genus: Lopus; Hahn, 1831

Synonyms
- Onychumenus Reuter, 1879

Genus of true bugs

Lopus is a genus of plant bugs in the family Miridae. There are at least three described species in Lopus.

== Species ==
These three species belong to the genus Lopus:

- Lopus decolor (Fallén, 1807)
- Lopus longiceps (Flor, 1860)
- Lopus oculatus Dahlbom, 1851
