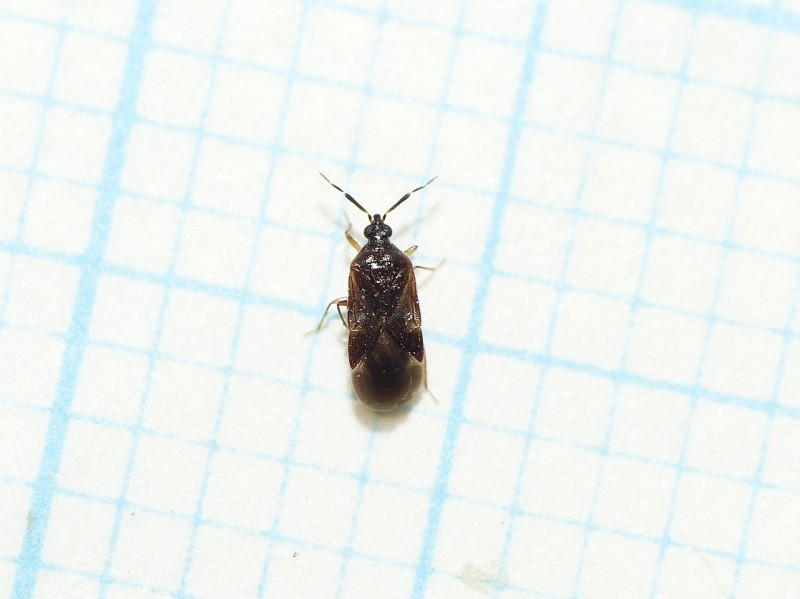
- Buchananiella continua

Scientific classification
- Kingdom: Animalia
- Phylum: Arthropoda
- Clade: Pancrustacea
- Class: Insecta
- Order: Hemiptera
- Suborder: Heteroptera
- Family: Anthocoridae
- Tribe: Dufouriellini
- Genus: Buchananiella; Reuter, 1884

= Buchananiella =

Genus of true bugs

Buchananiella is a genus of minute pirate bugs in the family Anthocoridae. There are at least three described species in Buchananiella.

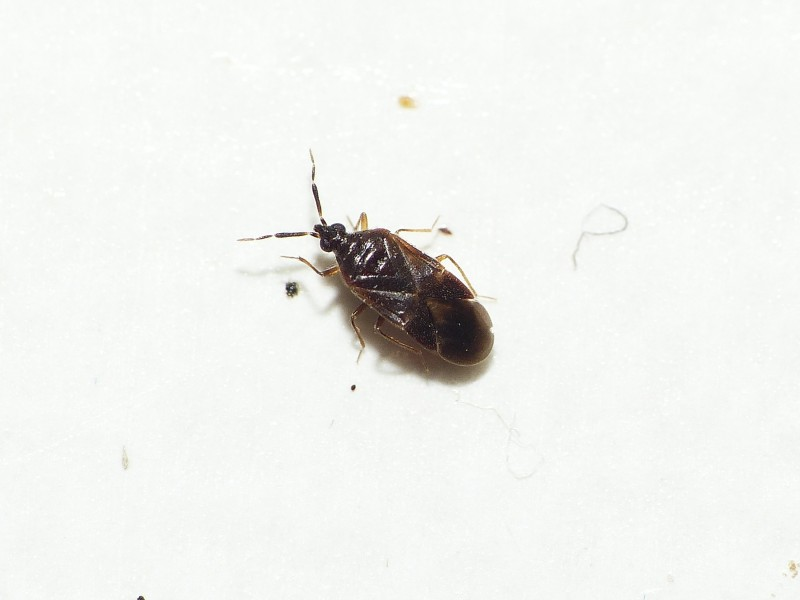
Buchananiella continua

== Species ==
These three species belong to the genus Buchananiella:

- Buchananiella continua (White, 1879)^{i c g b}
- Buchananiella crassicornis Carayon^{g}
- Buchananiella pseudococci^{g}

Data sources: i = ITIS, c = Catalogue of Life, g = GBIF, b = Bugguide.net
