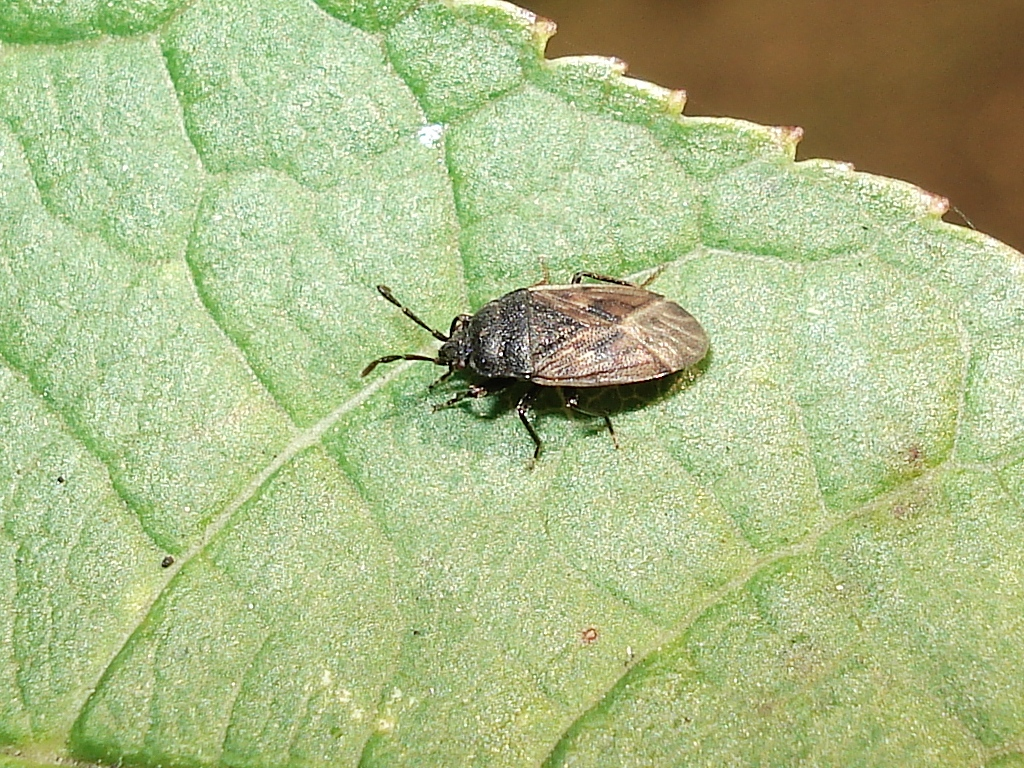
- Peritrechus geniculatus

Scientific classification
- Kingdom: Animalia
- Phylum: Arthropoda
- Clade: Pancrustacea
- Class: Insecta
- Order: Hemiptera
- Suborder: Heteroptera
- Family: Rhyparochromidae
- Tribe: Rhyparochromini
- Genus: Peritrechus; Fieber, 1860

= Peritrechus =

Genus of true bugs

Peritrechus is a genus of dirt-colored seed bugs in the family Rhyparochromidae. There are at least 20 described species in Peritrechus.

== Species ==
These 20 species belong to the genus Peritrechus:

- Peritrechus angusticollis (Sahlberg, 1848)^{i c g}
- Peritrechus convivus (Stål, 1851)^{i c g b}
- Peritrechus dissimilis Horvath, G., 1895^{c g}
- Peritrechus femoralis Kerzhner, I.M., 1977^{c g}
- Peritrechus flavicornis Jakovlev, 1876^{c g}
- Peritrechus fraternus Uhler, 1871^{i c g b}
- Peritrechus geniculatus (Hahn, 1831)^{c g}
- Peritrechus gracilicornis Puton, A., 1877^{c g}
- Peritrechus insignis Jakovlev, B.E., 1892^{c g}
- Peritrechus lundi Gmelin, 1790^{c g}
- Peritrechus meridionalis^{c g}
- Peritrechus nubilus (Fallen, C.F., 1807)^{c g}
- Peritrechus oculatus Jakovlev, B.E., 1885^{c g}
- Peritrechus paludemaris Barber, 1914^{i c g}
- Peritrechus pilosulus Scudder, 2000^{i g}
- Peritrechus pusillus Horvath, G., 1884^{c g}
- Peritrechus putoni Horvath, G., 1895^{c g}
- Peritrechus saskatchewanensis Barber, H.G., 1918^{c g}
- Peritrechus tristis Van Duzee, 1906^{i c g b}
- Peritrechus variegatus Kiritshenko, A.N., 1914^{c g}

Data sources: i = ITIS, c = Catalogue of Life, g = GBIF, b = Bugguide.net
