= Lasiacantha =

Scientific classification
- Kingdom: Animalia
- Phylum: Arthropoda
- Clade: Pancrustacea
- Class: Insecta
- Order: Hemiptera
- Suborder: Heteroptera
- Family: Tingidae
- Genus: Lasiacantha; Stål, 1873

Genus of true bugs

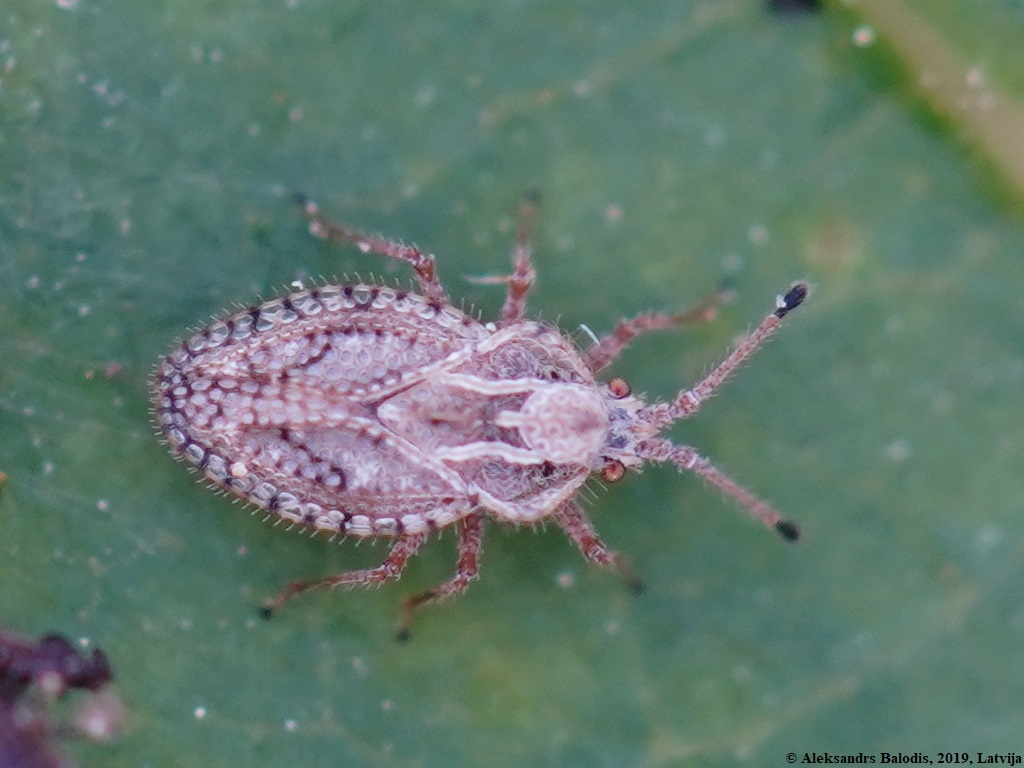
Lasiacantha Capucina specimen

Lasiacantha is a genus of true bugs belonging to the family Tingidae.

The species of this genus are found in Europe and Australia.

Species:

- Lasiacantha absimilis Drake, 1951
- Lasiacantha adamah Symonds & Cassis, 2013
