= Orthotylus virens =

Scientific classification
- Kingdom: Animalia
- Phylum: Arthropoda
- Class: Insecta
- Order: Hemiptera
- Suborder: Heteroptera
- Family: Miridae
- Genus: Orthotylus
- Species: O. virens

Binomial name
- Orthotylus virens (Fallen, 1807)

Species of true bug

Orthotylus virens is a species of bug from a family of Miridae that can be found in Austria, Baltic states (except for Lithuania), Bulgaria, Czech Republic, France, Germany, Moldova, Poland, Russia, Slovakia, Switzerland, Ukraine, Scandinavia, and Benelux (except for Belgium).
