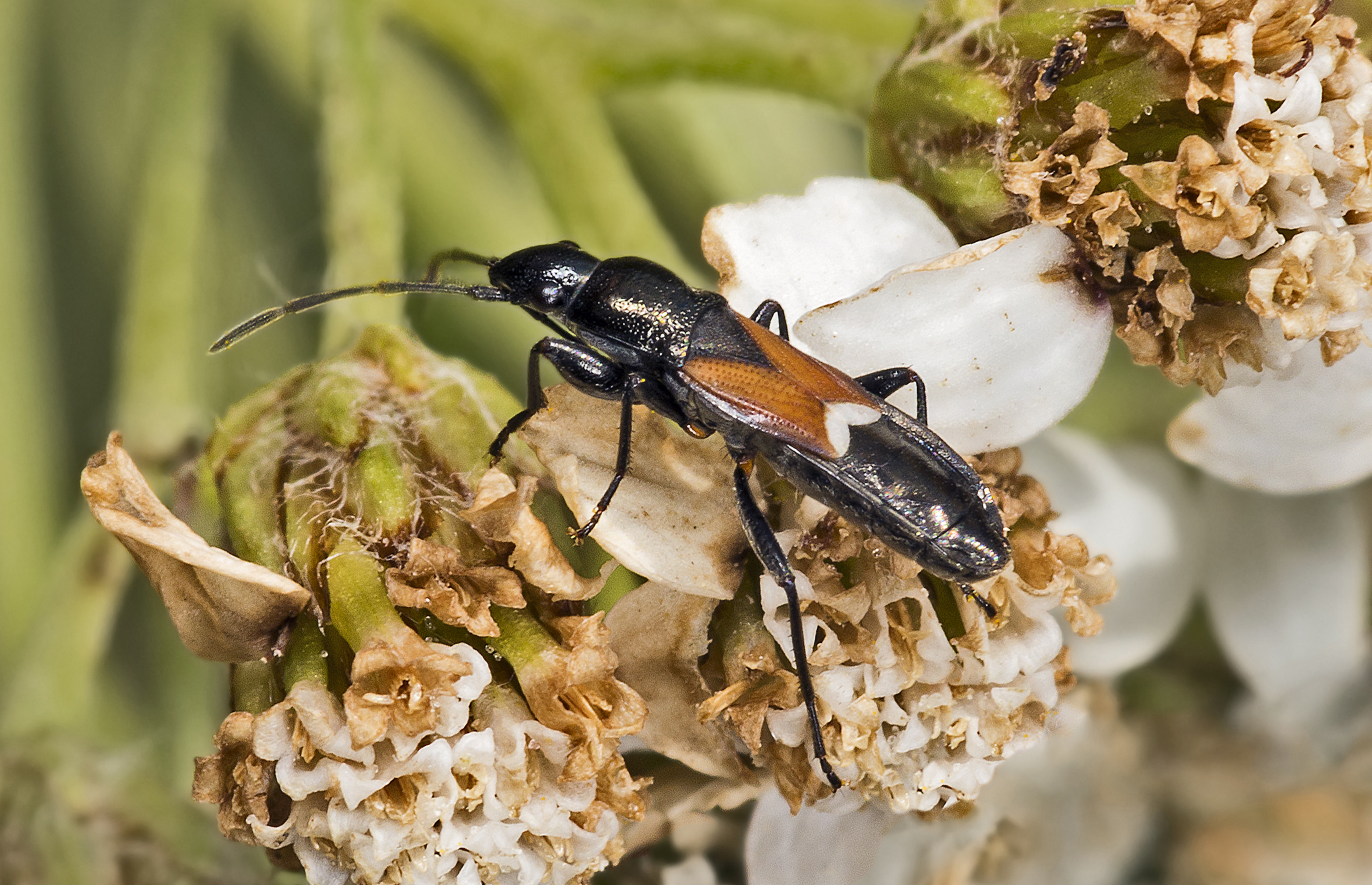
- Pterotmetus staphyliniformis

Scientific classification
- Domain: Eukaryota
- Kingdom: Animalia
- Phylum: Arthropoda
- Class: Insecta
- Order: Hemiptera
- Suborder: Heteroptera
- Family: Rhyparochromidae
- Genus: Pterotmetus; Amyot & Serville, 1843

= Pterotmetus =

Genus of true bugs

Pterotmetus is a genus of true bugs belonging to the family Rhyparochromidae.

The species of this genus are found in Europe.

Species:

- Pterotmetus dimidiatus Fieber, 1861
- Pterotmetus parnassius Horvath, 1882
