= Common damsel bug =

Common damsel bug is a common name for several insects and may refer to:

- Nabis americoferus, native to the Americas
- Nabis rugosus, native to Eurasia
