= Nabis occidentalis =

Scientific classification
- Domain: Eukaryota
- Kingdom: Animalia
- Phylum: Arthropoda
- Class: Insecta
- Order: Hemiptera
- Suborder: Heteroptera
- Family: Nabidae
- Genus: Nabis
- Species: N. occidentalis

Binomial name
- Nabis occidentalis (Kerzhner, 1963)

Species of true bug

Nabis occidentalis is a species of damsel bug in the family Nabidae.
