= Nabis inscriptus =

Scientific classification
- Domain: Eukaryota
- Kingdom: Animalia
- Phylum: Arthropoda
- Class: Insecta
- Order: Hemiptera
- Suborder: Heteroptera
- Family: Nabidae
- Genus: Nabis
- Species: N. inscriptus

Binomial name
- Nabis inscriptus (Kirby, 1837)

Species of true bug

Nabis inscriptus is a species of damsel bug in the family Nabidae. It is found in Europe and Northern Asia (excluding China) and North America.
