= Nabis ponticus =

Scientific classification
- Kingdom: Animalia
- Phylum: Arthropoda
- Class: Insecta
- Order: Hemiptera
- Suborder: Heteroptera
- Family: Nabidae
- Genus: Nabis
- Species: N. ponticus

Binomial name
- Nabis ponticus (Kerzhner, 1962)

Species of insect

Nabis ponticus is a type of damsel bug in the family Nabidae.
