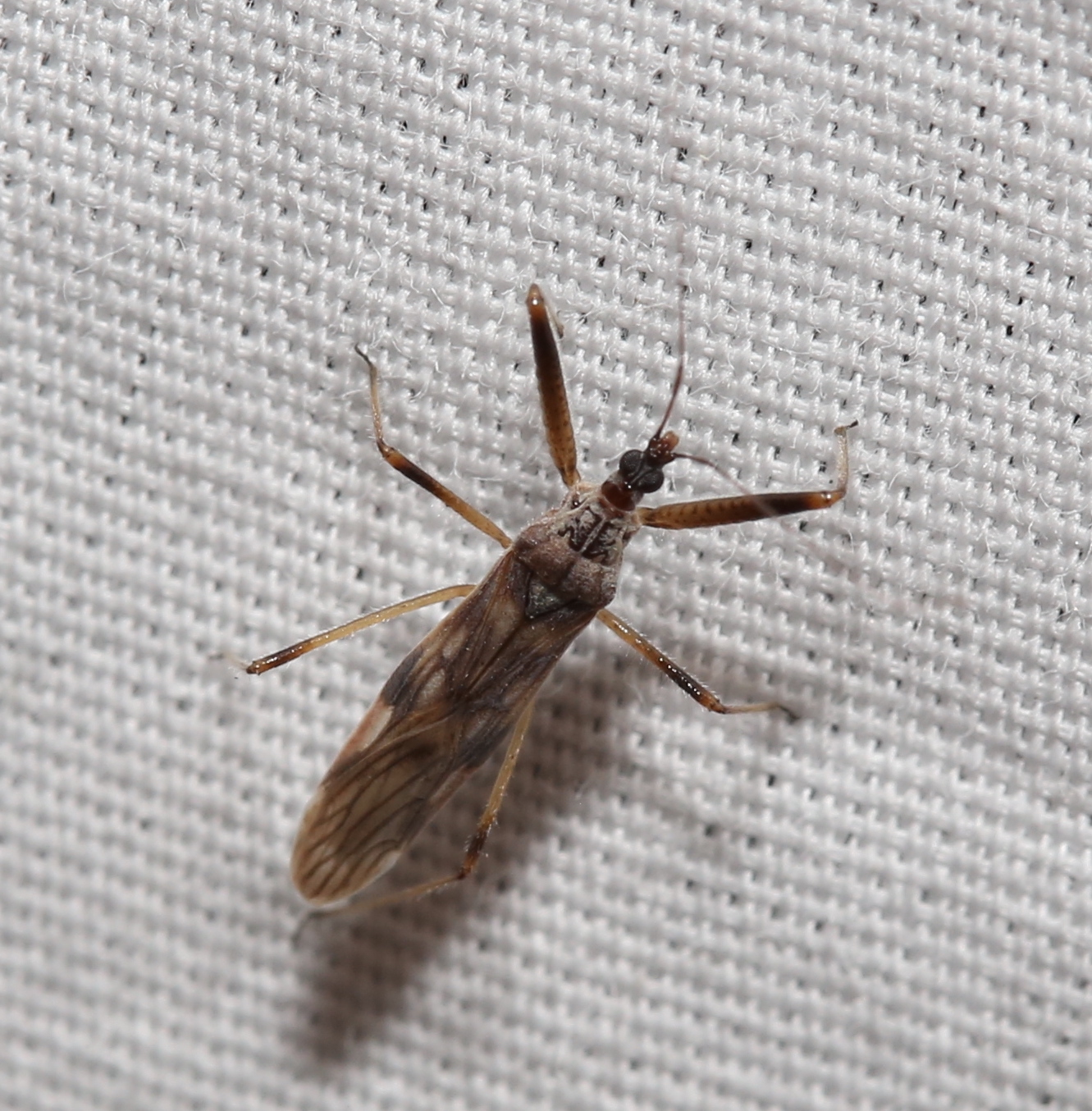

Scientific classification
- Kingdom: Animalia
- Phylum: Arthropoda
- Class: Insecta
- Order: Hemiptera
- Suborder: Heteroptera
- Family: Nabidae
- Tribe: Nabini
- Genus: Metatropiphorus
- Species: M. belfragii

Binomial name
- Metatropiphorus belfragii Reuter, 1872

= Metatropiphorus belfragii =

Species of true bug

Metatropiphorus belfragii is a species of damsel bug in the family Nabidae. It is found in the Caribbean and North America.
