= Nabis punctatus =

Scientific classification
- Kingdom: Animalia
- Phylum: Arthropoda
- Class: Insecta
- Order: Hemiptera
- Suborder: Heteroptera
- Family: Nabidae
- Genus: Nabis
- Species: N. punctatus

Binomial name
- Nabis punctatus A. Costa, 1847

Species of true bug

Nabis punctatus is a species of damsel bug in the family Nabidae.
