= Nabis christophi =

Scientific classification
- Kingdom: Animalia
- Phylum: Arthropoda
- Class: Insecta
- Order: Hemiptera
- Suborder: Heteroptera
- Family: Nabidae
- Genus: Nabis
- Species: N. christophi

Binomial name
- Nabis christophi Dohrn, 1862

Species of true bug

Nabis christophi is a type of damsel bug in the family Nabidae.
