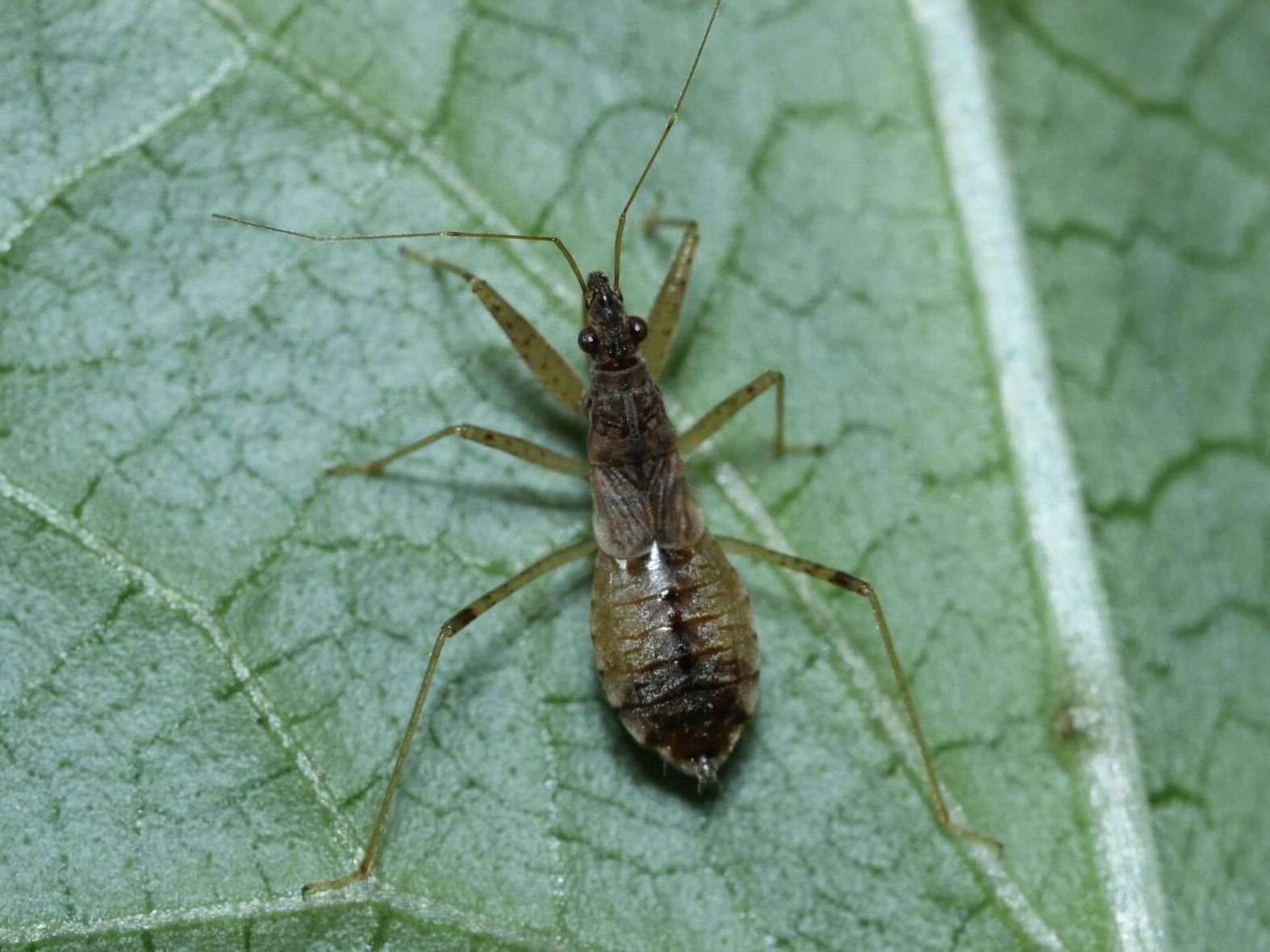

Scientific classification
- Kingdom: Animalia
- Phylum: Arthropoda
- Clade: Pancrustacea
- Class: Insecta
- Order: Hemiptera
- Suborder: Heteroptera
- Family: Nabidae
- Genus: Nabis
- Species: N. apicalis

Binomial name
- Nabis apicalis Matsumura, 1913

= Nabis apicalis =

Species of true bug

Nabis apicalis is a species of damsel bug in the family Nabidae.
