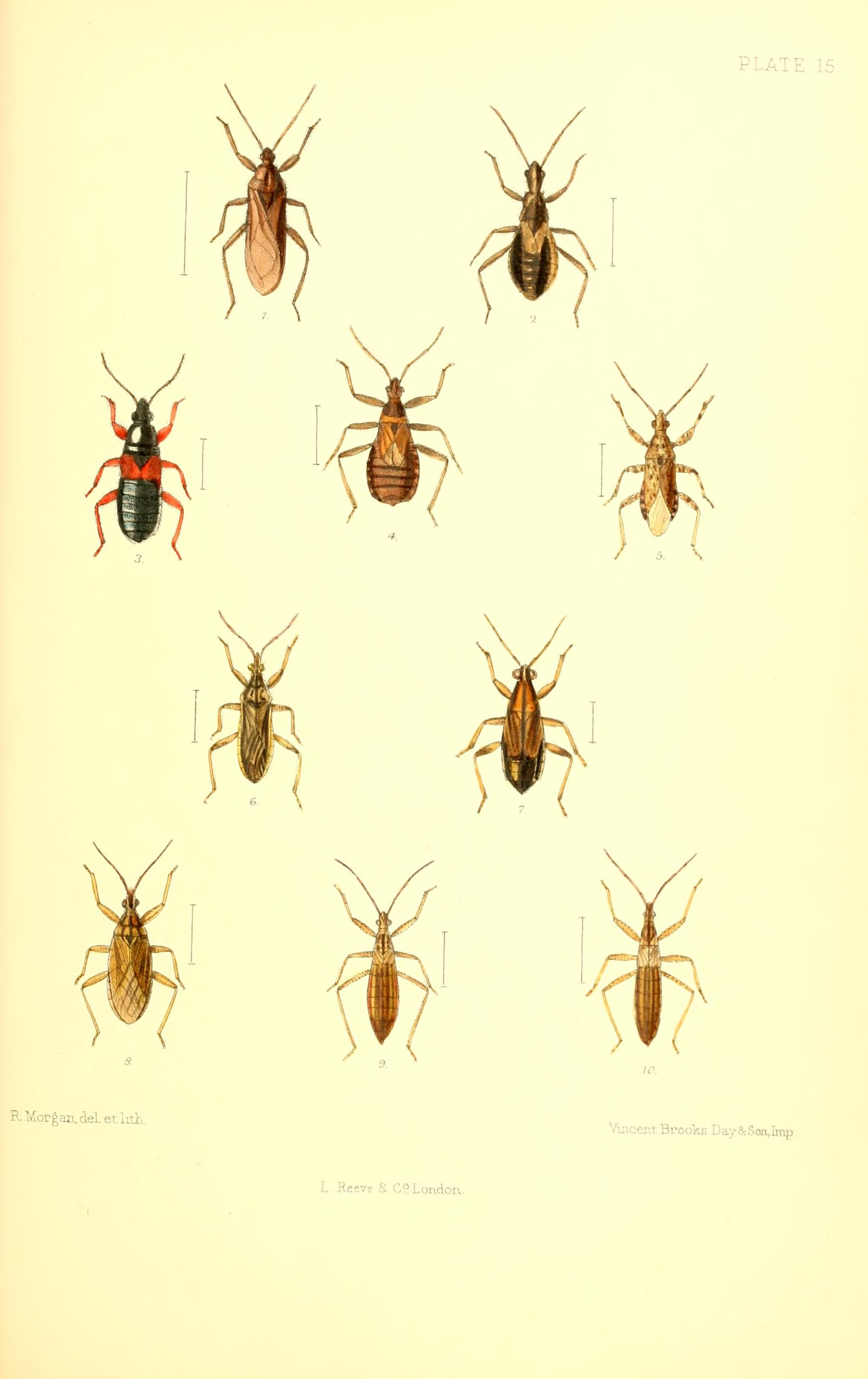
- Nabis limbatus depicted in Edward Saunders Hemiptera Heteroptera of the British Islands (figure 9)

Scientific classification
- Domain: Eukaryota
- Kingdom: Animalia
- Phylum: Arthropoda
- Class: Insecta
- Order: Hemiptera
- Suborder: Heteroptera
- Family: Nabidae
- Genus: Nabis
- Species: N. limbatus

Binomial name
- Nabis limbatus Dahlbom, 1851

= Nabis limbatus =

Species of true bug

Nabis limbatus is a species of damsel bug in the family Nabidae. It is found in Northern Europe and the northern part of Western and Central Europe. It occurs in the East in Eastern Europe and across the Palearctic to Siberia to China and Korea. It is introduced in Canada. In the Alps, it rises to about 1400 meters above sea level. In the South of Europe, it is found only in the central uplands.

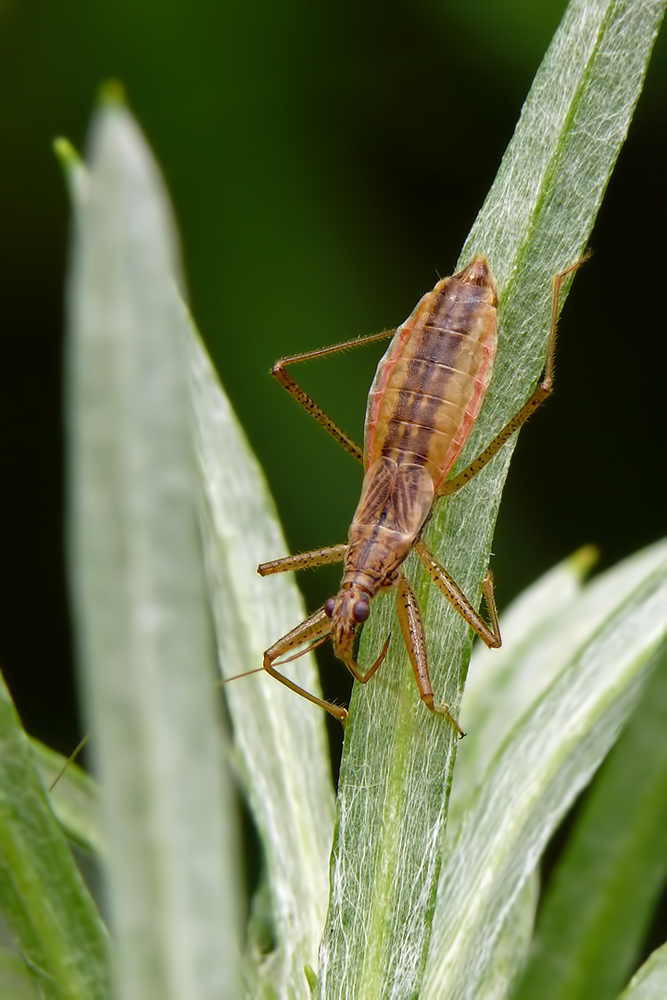
Common damsel bug (Nabis limbatus). Photo taken in Lithuania, Rukainiai forest.

Nabis limbatus is found in tall grass and the herbaceous layer in moist to wet, half shady or open habitats. In forests they are found predominantly in glades, the edge of pathways and margins. Sometimes they are found in drier places. It is a predator with a non-specific range of prey and hunts on the ground as well as in the herb layer. Overwintering occurs as the egg. Nymphs are found from mid-May until July, adults from the end of June. Females insert their eggs mainly in August in blades of grass or the stems of herbaceous plants. The micropterous bugs go through four nymphal stages.
