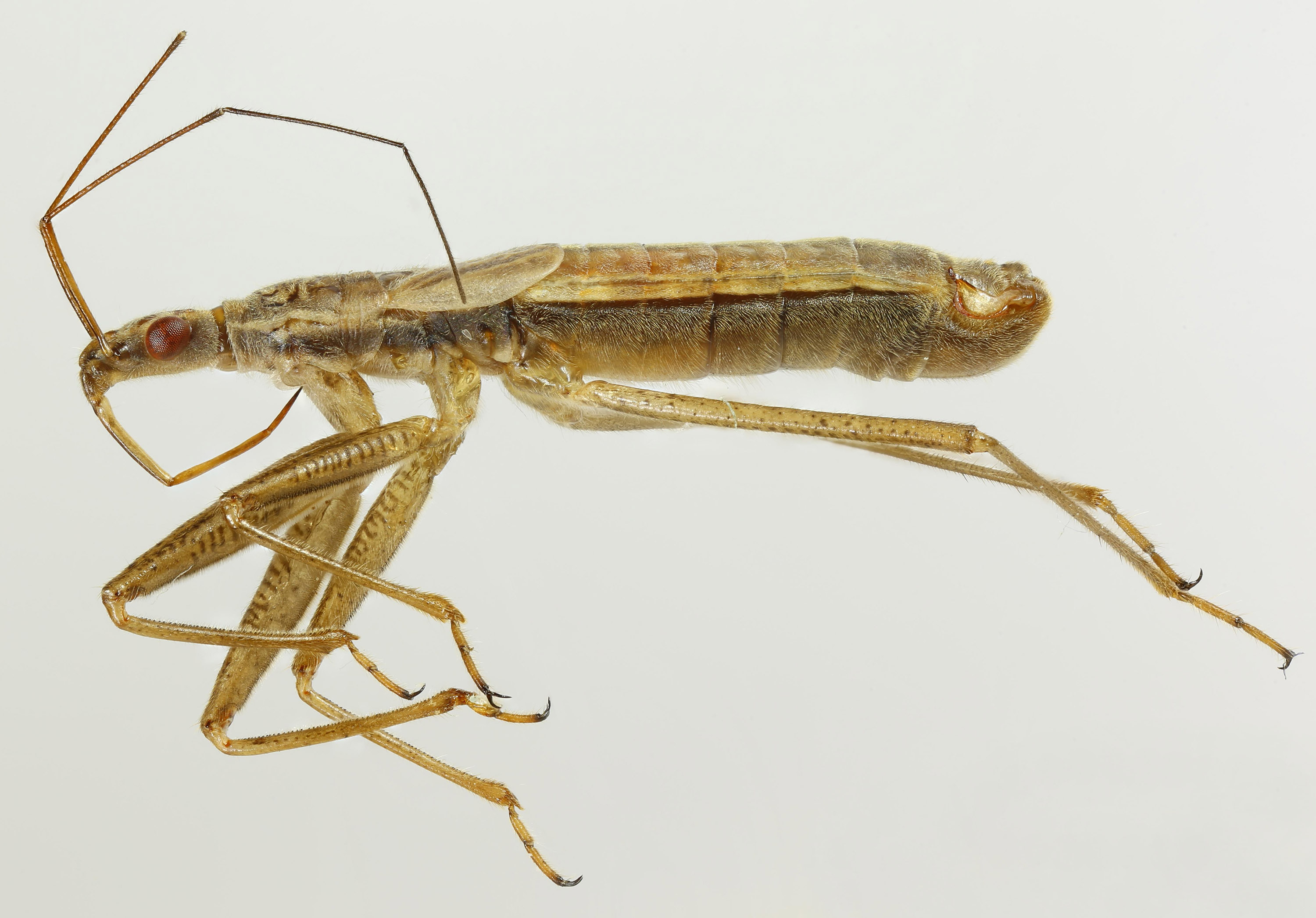

Scientific classification
- Domain: Eukaryota
- Kingdom: Animalia
- Phylum: Arthropoda
- Class: Insecta
- Order: Hemiptera
- Suborder: Heteroptera
- Family: Nabidae
- Genus: Nabis
- Species: N. lineatus

Binomial name
- Nabis lineatus Dahlbom, 1851

= Nabis lineatus =

Species of true bug

Nabis lineatus is a species of damsel bug in the family Nabidae.

It is found in Europe from the South of the British Isles and Scandinavia to the North of the Mediterranean region and East across the Palearctic to Russia and Kazakhstan and Northeast China. The range is disjunct. In Western and Northern Europe, the species occurs mainly in the area of climate influenced by the Atlantic coasts and lowlands, in the East, the species is, however, found isolated in salty places inland. It is not present in the central uplands and mountains.

Nabis lineatus lives in Carex and Juncus habitats. Near the coast it occurs in brackish water and inland in fens and raised bogs or aggradation zones of standing waters. In the continental area it is found only in salty places inland.

Nabis lineatus lives close to the ground as well as high up on sedges (Carex), rushes (Juncus), Molinia, Eriophorum, Glyceria. The micropterous adults go through four stages of nymph.
