= Nabis mumfordi =

Scientific classification
- Kingdom: Animalia
- Phylum: Arthropoda
- Clade: Pancrustacea
- Class: Insecta
- Order: Hemiptera
- Suborder: Heteroptera
- Family: Nabidae
- Genus: Nabis
- Species: N. mumfordi

Binomial name
- Nabis mumfordi Van Duzee, 1932

Species of true bug

Nabis mumfordi is a species of damsel bug in the family Nabidae.
