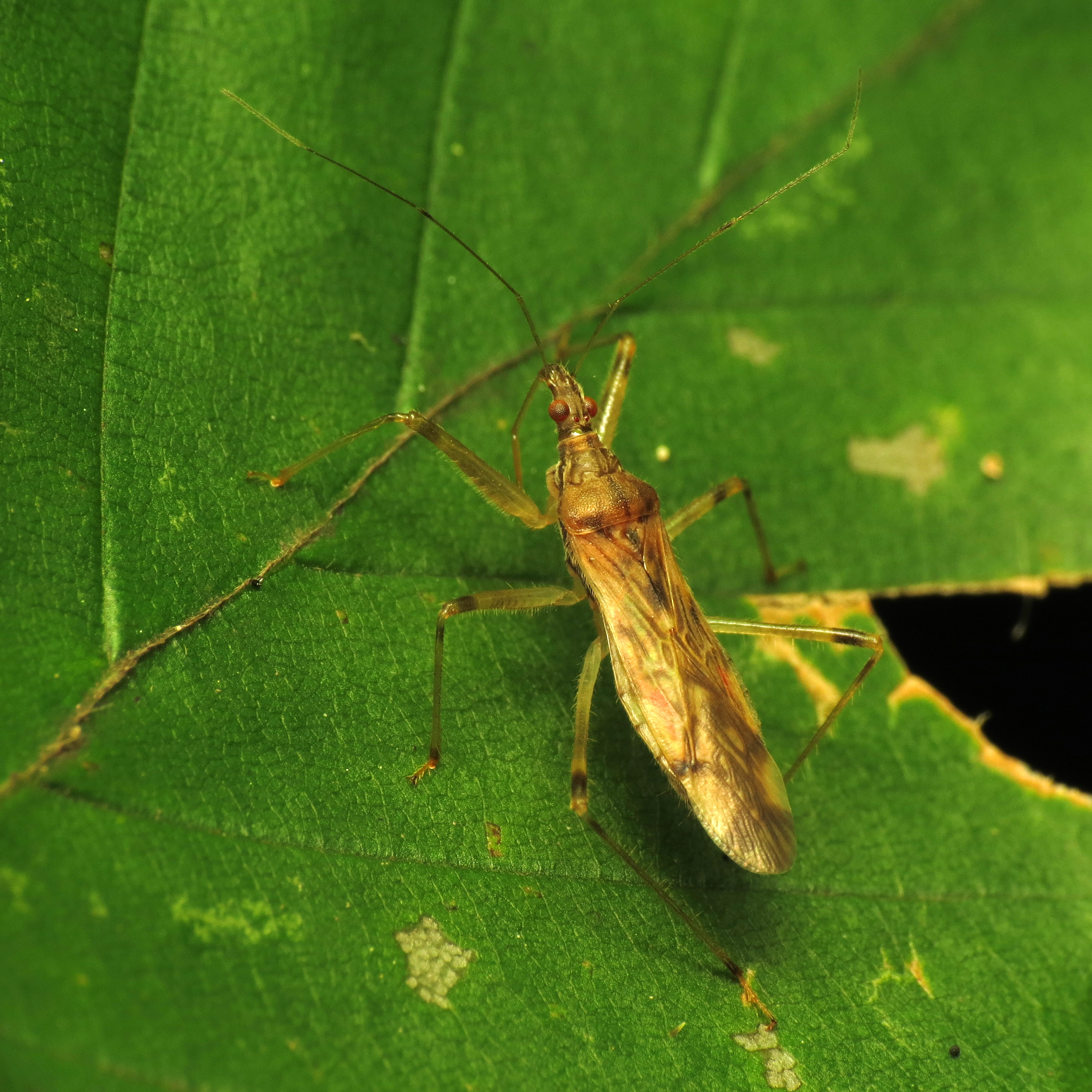

Scientific classification
- Domain: Eukaryota
- Kingdom: Animalia
- Phylum: Arthropoda
- Class: Insecta
- Order: Hemiptera
- Suborder: Heteroptera
- Family: Nabidae
- Tribe: Nabini
- Genus: Lasiomerus
- Species: L. annulatus

Binomial name
- Lasiomerus annulatus (Reuter, 1872)

Synonyms
- Nabis annulatus Reuter, 1872

= Lasiomerus annulatus =

Species of true bug

Lasiomerus annulatus is a species of damsel bug in the family Nabidae. It is found in North America.

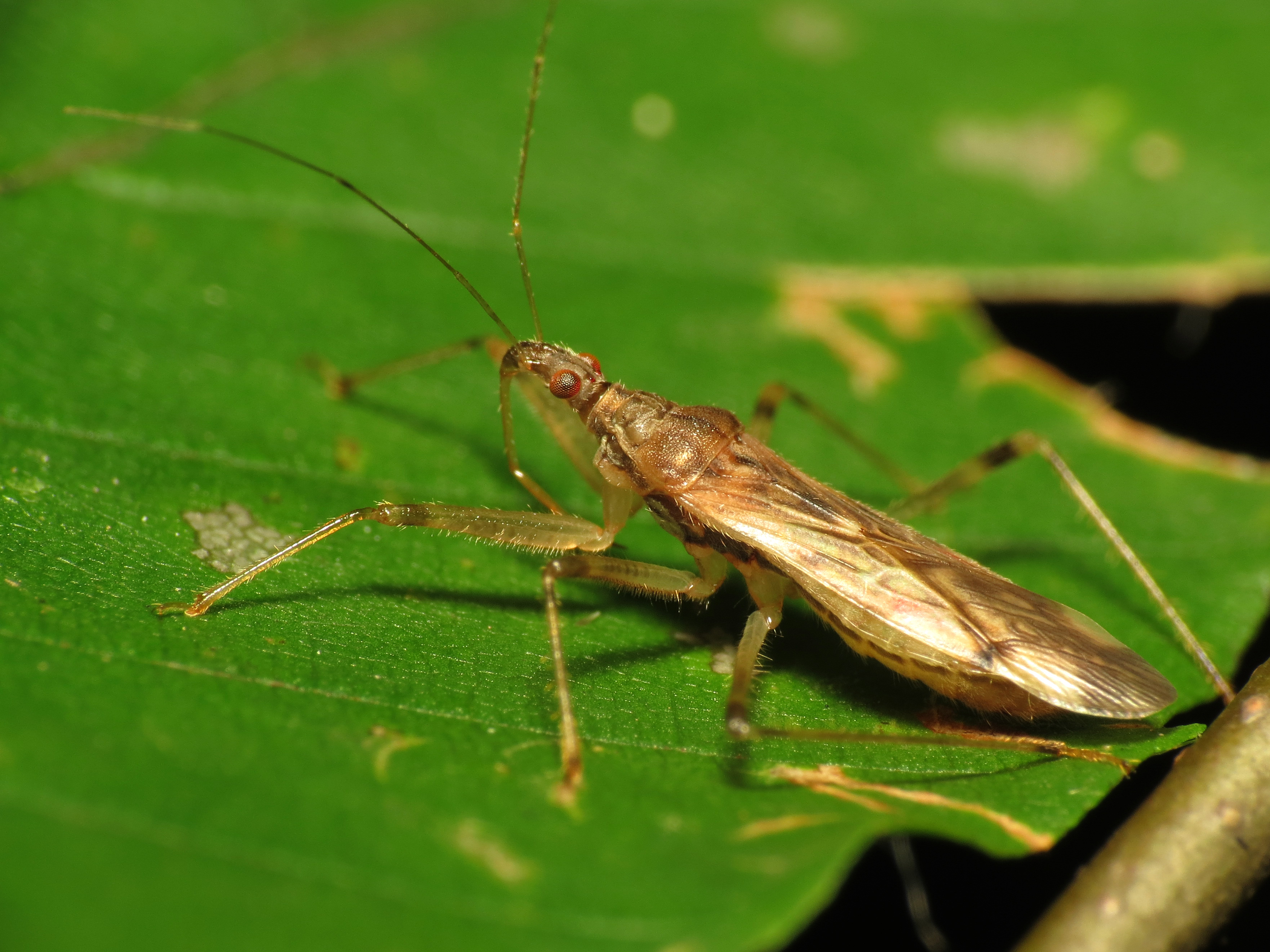

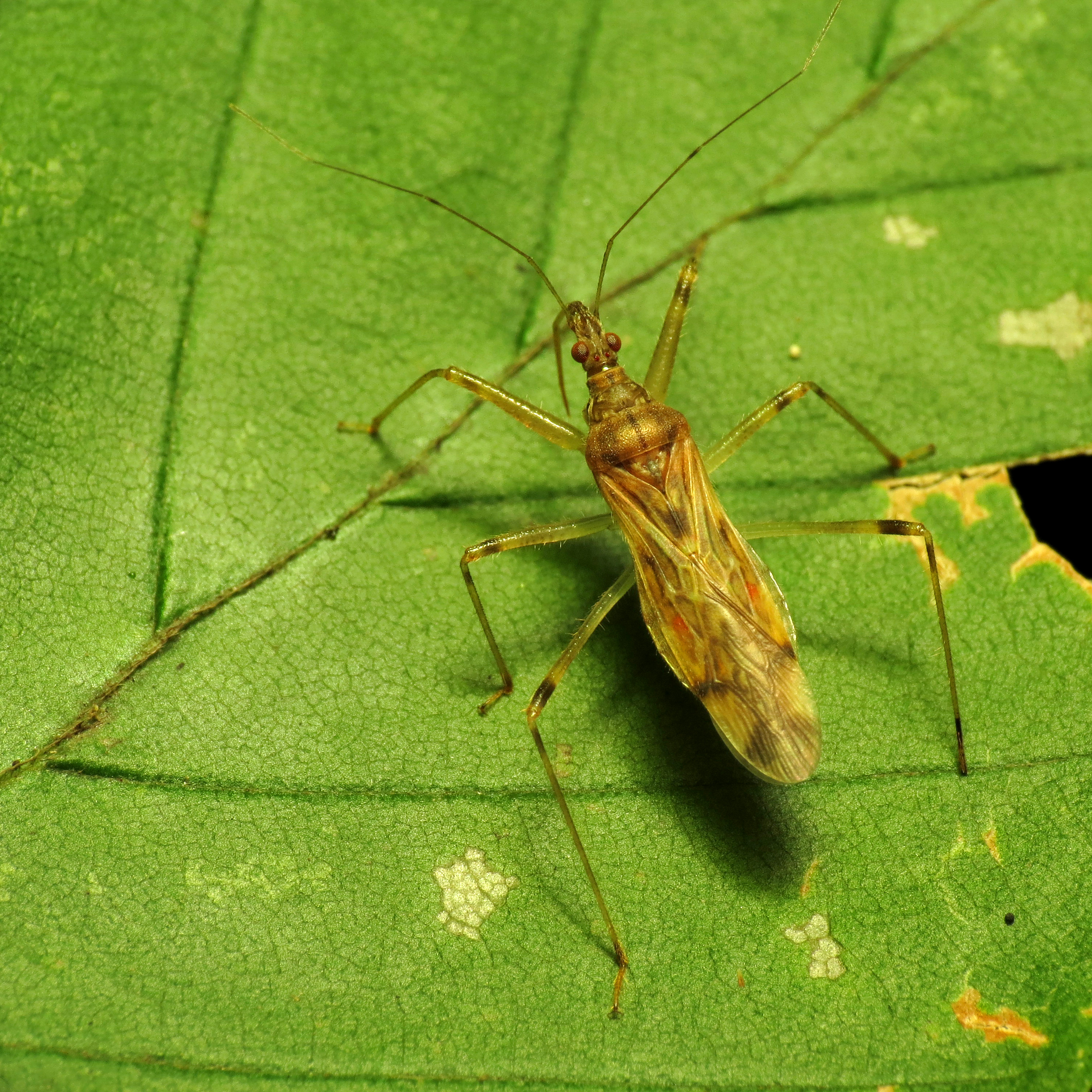
