= Nabis gagneorum =

Scientific classification
- Domain: Eukaryota
- Kingdom: Animalia
- Phylum: Arthropoda
- Class: Insecta
- Order: Hemiptera
- Suborder: Heteroptera
- Family: Nabidae
- Genus: Nabis
- Species: N. gagneorum

Binomial name
- Nabis gagneorum Polhemus, 1999

Species of true bug

Nabis gagneorum is a species of damsel bug in the family Nabidae. It is found in Oceania.
