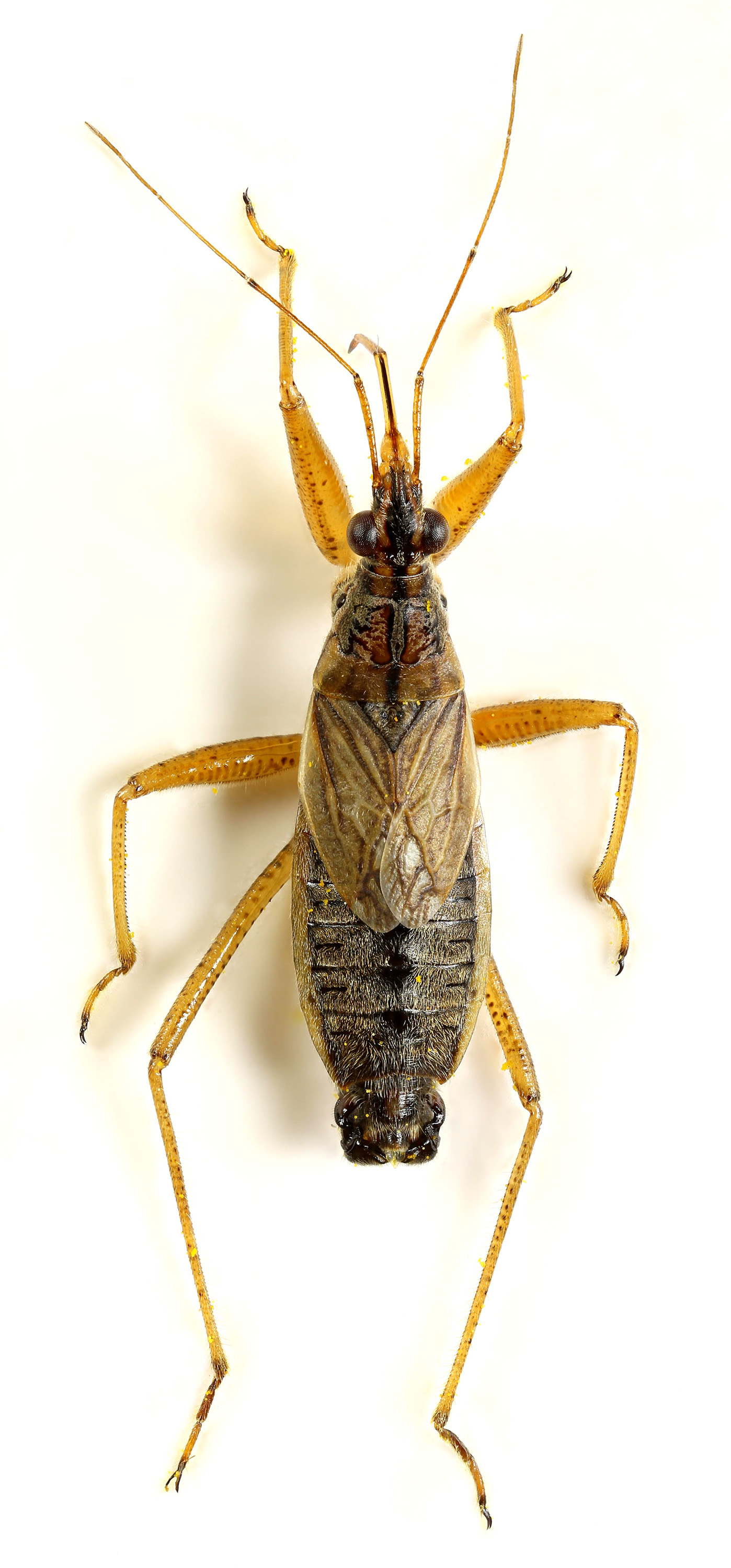

Scientific classification
- Domain: Eukaryota
- Kingdom: Animalia
- Phylum: Arthropoda
- Class: Insecta
- Order: Hemiptera
- Suborder: Heteroptera
- Family: Nabidae
- Genus: Nabis
- Species: N. flavomarginatus

Binomial name
- Nabis flavomarginatus Scholz, 1847

= Nabis flavomarginatus =

Species of true bug

Nabis flavomarginatus is a species of damsel bug in the family Nabidae.

== Distribution ==
This species has a Holarctic distribution. In Europe it is found in the North and East but it is largely missing in the South West and South. In the East the distribution extends over the Palearctic to Siberia and Central Asia and the North of China, Japan and Korea. In the Nearctic realm, it is common in Alaska, Canada and Greenland. In 1989 it was found for the first time in the continental body of the United States (Maine). In Greenland, it is the only species in the family Nabidae conspicuously on the former settlement area of the Vikings (their introduction through this in the early Middle Ages is speculated about).

In Western and Central Europe N. flavomaculatus is boreomontane. It rises in the Alps to 2200 meters above sea level.

== Habitat ==
N. flavomaculatus is found in wet, open habitats with a high proportion of grasses (Poaceae), sedges (Cyperaceae) and rushes (Juncaceae). The species prefers micro-climatic lower temperatures than most other species of the subfamily Nabinae. It is rare in half-shady places.

Nabis flavomarginatus lives mainly in the herbaceous layer and has a non-specific prey spectrum. Cicadas are however frequent prey according to their habitat. Overwintering occurs as the egg. The nymphs occur from May the adults (depending on the altitude) from June/July to October, until July. Late in the year, only females are observed.
