= Nabis oscillans =

Scientific classification
- Domain: Eukaryota
- Kingdom: Animalia
- Phylum: Arthropoda
- Class: Insecta
- Order: Hemiptera
- Suborder: Heteroptera
- Family: Nabidae
- Genus: Nabis
- Species: N. oscillans

Binomial name
- Nabis oscillans Blackburn, 1888

Species of true bug

Nabis oscillans is a species of damsel bug in the family Nabidae. It is found in Oceania.
