= Nabis kalmii =

Scientific classification
- Domain: Eukaryota
- Kingdom: Animalia
- Phylum: Arthropoda
- Class: Insecta
- Order: Hemiptera
- Suborder: Heteroptera
- Family: Nabidae
- Genus: Nabis
- Species: N. kalmii

Binomial name
- Nabis kalmii Reuter, 1872

Species of true bug

Nabis kalmii is a species of damsel bug in the family Nabidae. It is found in North America.
