= Nabis edax =

Scientific classification
- Domain: Eukaryota
- Kingdom: Animalia
- Phylum: Arthropoda
- Class: Insecta
- Order: Hemiptera
- Suborder: Heteroptera
- Family: Nabidae
- Genus: Nabis
- Species: N. edax

Binomial name
- Nabis edax Blatchely, 1929

Species of true bug

Nabis edax is a species of damsel bug in the family Nabidae. It is found in North America.
