= Nabis palifer =

Scientific classification
- Kingdom: Animalia
- Phylum: Arthropoda
- Class: Insecta
- Order: Hemiptera
- Suborder: Heteroptera
- Family: Nabidae
- Genus: Nabis
- Species: N. palifer

Binomial name
- Nabis palifer Seidenstücker, 1954

Species of true bug

Nabis palifer is a species of damsel bug in the family Nabidae.
