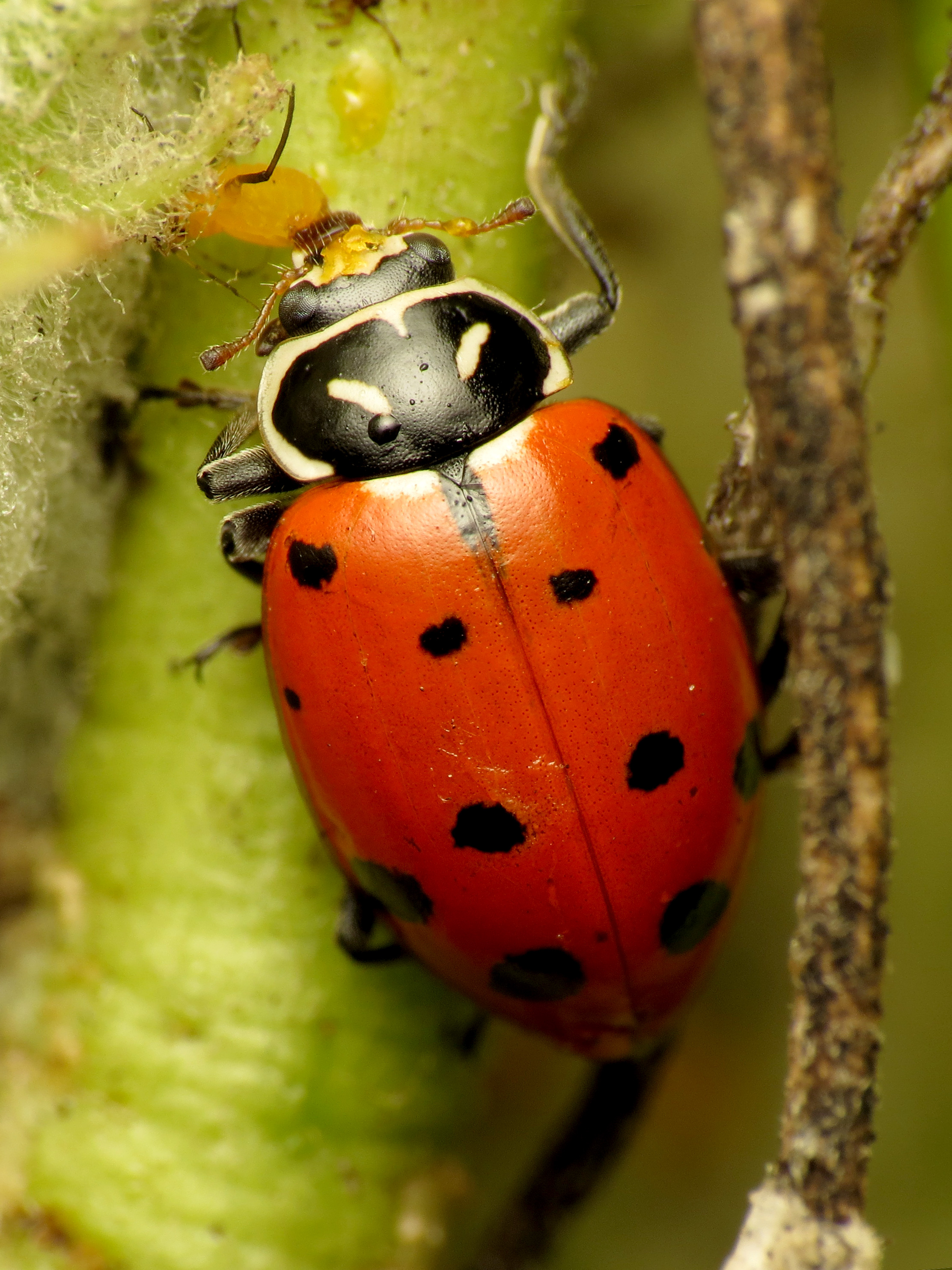
- Sucking on an aphid, Rock Creek Park

Conservation status
- Secure (NatureServe)

Scientific classification
- Kingdom: Animalia
- Phylum: Arthropoda
- Clade: Pancrustacea
- Class: Insecta
- Order: Coleoptera
- Suborder: Polyphaga
- Infraorder: Cucujiformia
- Family: Coccinellidae
- Genus: Hippodamia
- Species: H. convergens

Binomial name
- Hippodamia convergens Guérin-Méneville, 1842

Synonyms
- Coccinella (Hippodamia) convergens Guérin-Méneville, 1844; Coccinella modesta Melsheimer, 1847; Hippodamia juncta Casey, 1899; Hippodamia convergens var. obsoleta Crotch, 1873; Hippodamia praticola Mulsant, 1850

= Hippodamia convergens =

Convergent lady beetle

Species of beetle

Hippodamia convergens, commonly known as the convergent lady beetle, is one of the most common lady beetles in North America and is found throughout the continent. They tend to live a variety of habitats, including grasslands and forests.

Female H. convergens can lay over 1000 eggs over the span of a few months during the spring or early summer. In some populations, the beetles may undergo diapause if there are limited food resources to delay reproduction.

H. convergens eat soft-bodied insects, with aphids being the primary food resource. Aphids are a known pest, so the H. convergens has been used as a method to control aphids by releasing the beetles to act as a predator for the aphids.

== Range ==
Convergent lady beetles are native to North America, but have also been found in South America after they were imported from California.

== Habitat ==
H. convergens tend to be more successful and more likely to survive to adulthood in warmer temperatures. In some areas, they gather on sunflower patches, having moved from wheat fields. They use the petioles of the sunflowers to hydrate, particularly in arid summer months. They populate grasslands, forests, agricultural fields, gardens, and national parks.

These beetles have been shown to have a lower temperature tolerance of 6.5°C (approximately 43°F) and an upper temperature tolerance of 50°C (approximately 122°F). They have been found to achieve optimal reproductive and survival rates at 25.12°C (approximately 77°F) with a relative humidity of 63.78%.

== Life cycle ==
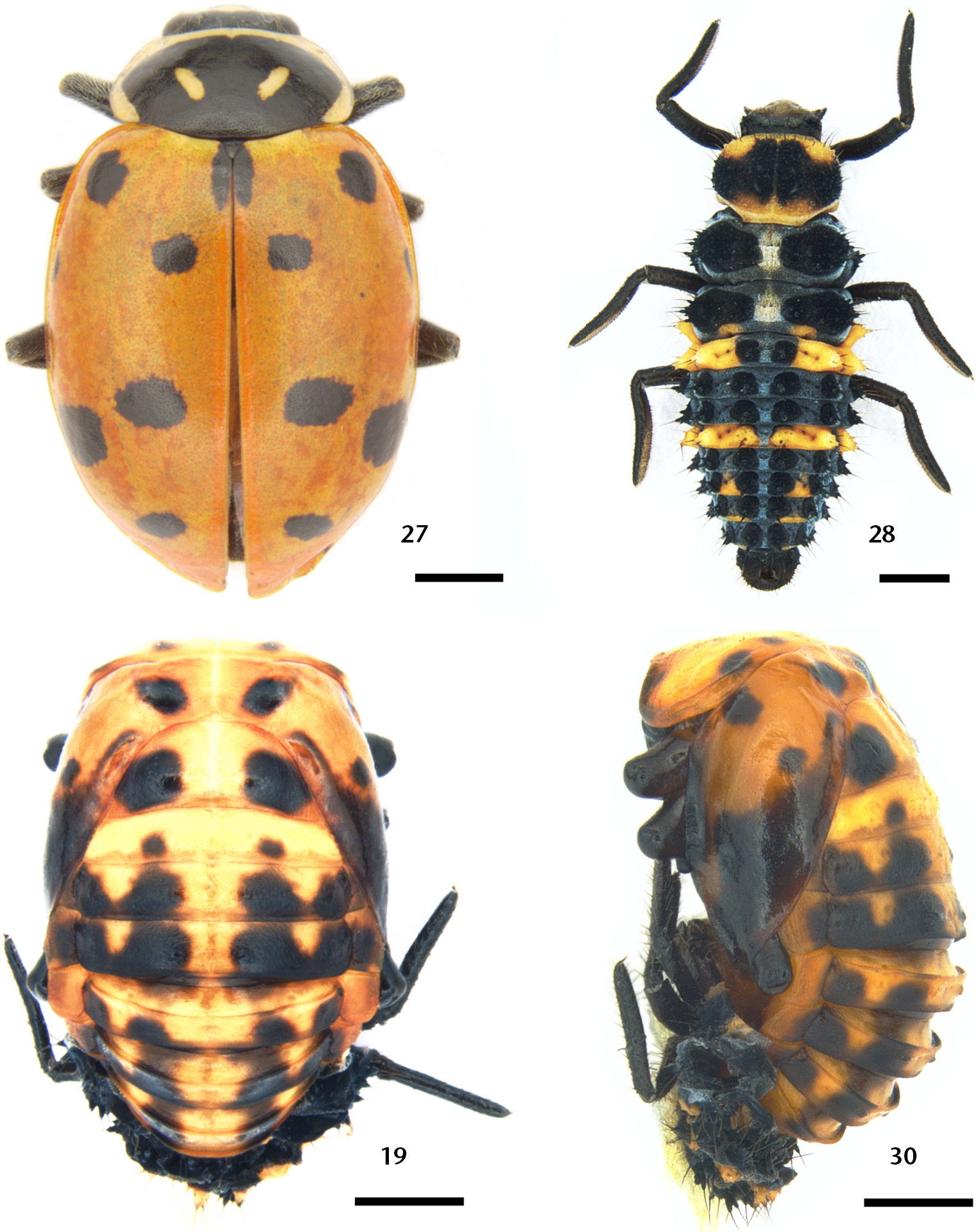
Life cycle

The female lady beetle lays 200 to 1000 eggs over several months during spring and early summer. The eggs are small and spindle-shaped and are laid near the prey in upright batches of fifteen to thirty eggs. The larvae are dark and somewhat alligator-shaped.

Once the larvae begin feeding, they grow quickly and molt four times over a period of up to a month. Larvae generally move between plants by traveling across leaves. However, they are able to travel via soil if the leaves cannot be crossed. The pupal stage lasts about a week and mating takes place soon after adult eclosion. If the food supply is abundant, the female may start laying within about a week of mating, but if it is scarce, she may wait for up to nine months.

Upon reaching the adult stage, females feed on fats and proteins for a week. This increases the production of juvenile hormone, helping the ovaries mature. This hormone also causes a behavior that results in long distance migration.

In the western United States, these beetles may spend up to nine months in diapause in large groups in mountain valleys. Some populations have been shown to undergo diapause when nutrients are scarce, using limited food resources to develop fat bodies and postpone the onset of reproduction until they can find a consistent and sufficient food source. During diapause, adult females are known to actively engage in flight.

== Diet ==
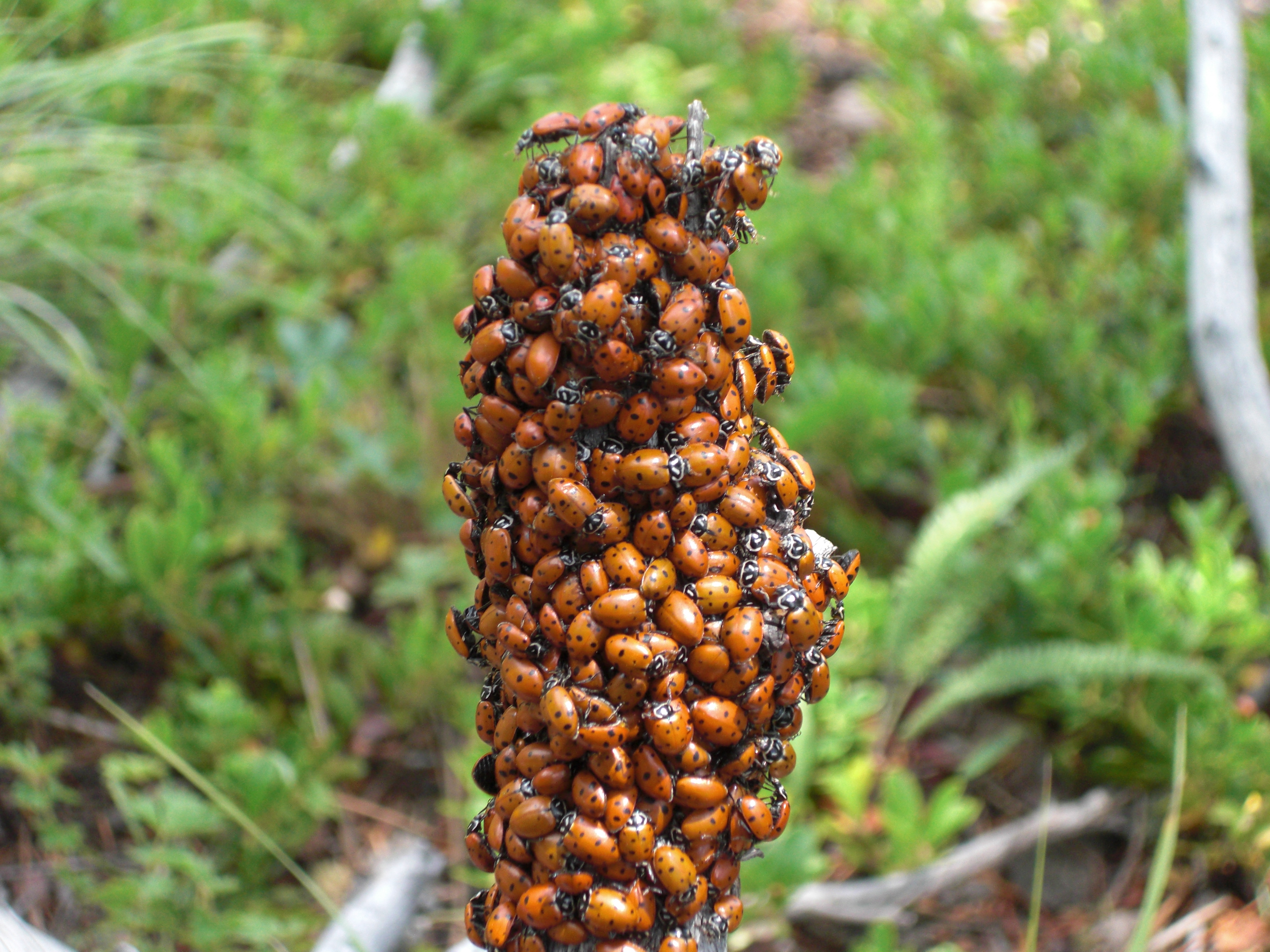
Convergent lady beetles adult aggregation

Both larvae and adult H. convergens primarily consume aphids. They are active hunters, meaning that they mobilize and travel to hunt for their prey. This also means that the larvae do not rely on helpers at the very least to gather food, meaning that the larvae will start searching for prey almost immediately upon hatching. The first larvae that hatch in each batch may start by eating the unhatched eggs. This may provide energy for the larvae before they find any aphids. Fourth-instar larvae may consume about fifty aphids per day and adults may eat about twenty. When aphids are scarce, the adults can eat honeydew, nectar and pollen or even petals and other soft parts of plants.

H. convergens feed on other soft-bodied insects such as scales and thrips. They are also known to exhibit cannibalistic behaviors when food is especially scarce.

== Biological control ==
Convergent lady beetles have been used for augmentative biological control to temporarily increase predator numbers to control aphids. Because of the overwintering habits of non-reproductive adults, released beetles tend to quickly disperse from their release site. Adults released in enclosed settings such as greenhouses can contribute to lower aphid numbers.

However, they tend to disperse before mating and laying eggs, so eggs are not left behind to hatch and continue the cycle of controlling the aphid population. This occurs even when live prey is still present.

Beetles of this species used for biological control that are in a state of diapause have been known to not consume prey.

This species was not included in the list of predatory insects usable for population control in the 2021 guidelines issued by the University of Florida, Institute of Food and Agricultural Sciences.

== Natural enemies ==
Entomopathogenic fungi used as biopesticides such as Metarhizium anisopliae, Paecilomyces fumosoroseus, and Beauveria bassiana can infect larvae. Infection by Beauveria bassiana in particular has been shown to affect the temperatures these beetles will tolerate.

Geocoris bullatus and Nabis alternatus prey on H. convergens eggs.

H. convergens may be a host for different invertebrate parasites such as Dinocampus coccinellae, Homalotylus terminalis, and Tetrapolipus hippodamiae.
