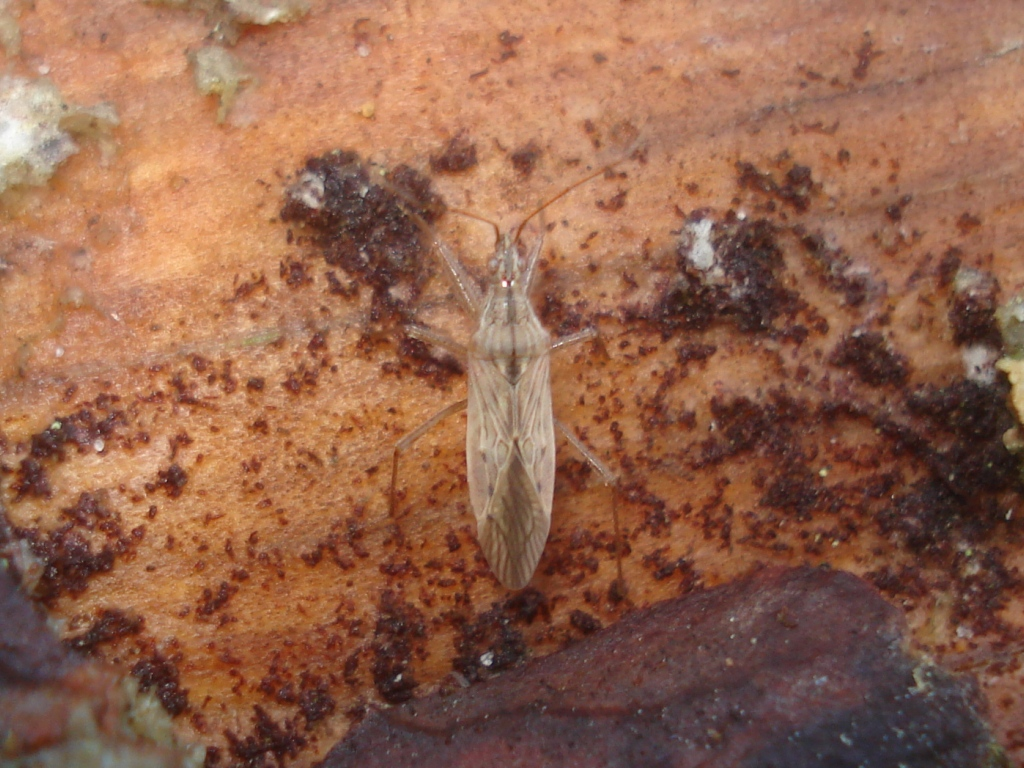

Scientific classification
- Kingdom: Animalia
- Phylum: Arthropoda
- Class: Insecta
- Order: Hemiptera
- Suborder: Heteroptera
- Family: Nabidae
- Genus: Nabis
- Species: N. ferus

Binomial name
- Nabis ferus (Linnaeus, 1758)

= Nabis ferus =

Species of true bug

Nabis ferus is a species of damsel bug in the family Nabidae. It is found in Central America and Europe.

== Subspecies ==
These two subspecies belong to the species Nabis ferus:

- Nabis ferus ferus
- Nabis ferus pallidipennis Harris
