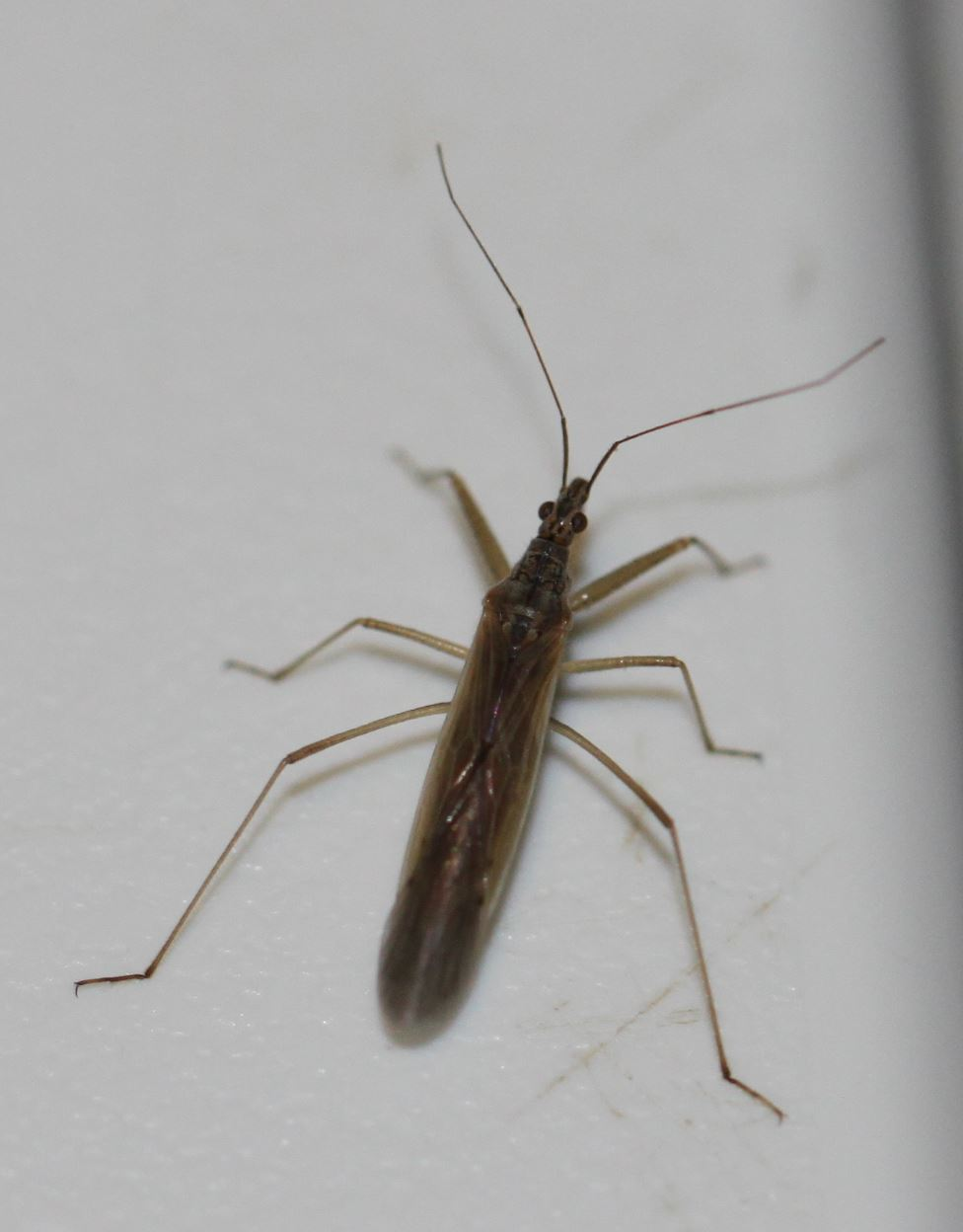

Scientific classification
- Domain: Eukaryota
- Kingdom: Animalia
- Phylum: Arthropoda
- Class: Insecta
- Order: Hemiptera
- Suborder: Heteroptera
- Family: Nabidae
- Genus: Nabis
- Species: N. capsiformis

Binomial name
- Nabis capsiformis Germar, 1838

= Nabis capsiformis =

Species of true bug

Nabis capsiformis, the pale damsel bug, is a species of damsel bug in the family Nabidae. It is found in Africa, the Caribbean, Europe and Northern Asia (excluding China), Central America, North America, Oceania, and South America.
