= Nabis reuteri =

Scientific classification
- Kingdom: Animalia
- Phylum: Arthropoda
- Class: Insecta
- Order: Hemiptera
- Suborder: Heteroptera
- Family: Nabidae
- Genus: Nabis
- Species: N. reuteri

Binomial name
- Nabis reuteri Jakovlev, 1876

Species of true bug

Nabis reuteri is a species of damsel bug in the family Nabidae.
