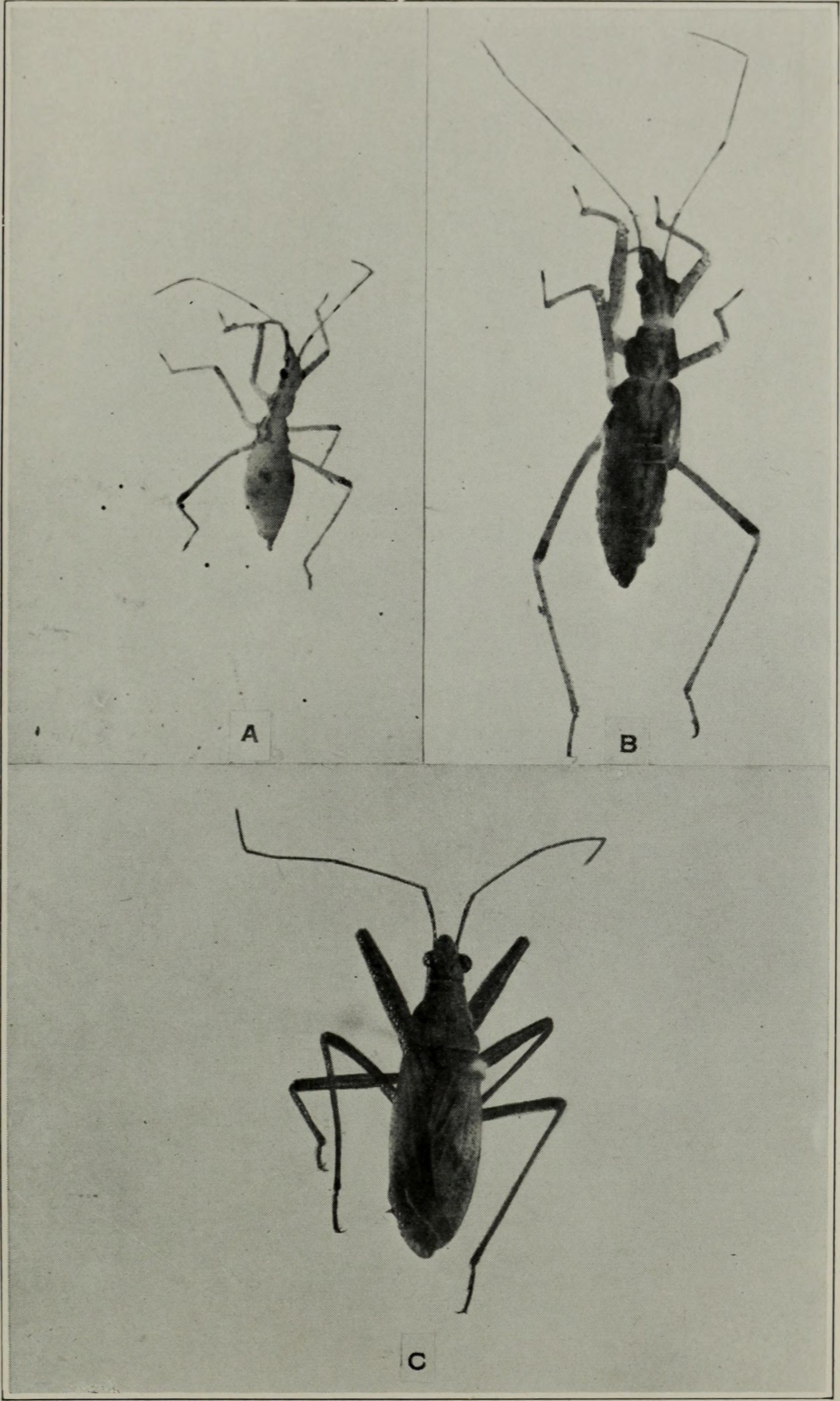
- Nymphs and adult

Scientific classification
- Domain: Eukaryota
- Kingdom: Animalia
- Phylum: Arthropoda
- Class: Insecta
- Order: Hemiptera
- Suborder: Heteroptera
- Family: Nabidae
- Genus: Nabis
- Species: N. rufusculus

Binomial name
- Nabis rufusculus Reuter, 1872

= Nabis rufusculus =

Species of true bug

Nabis rufusculus is a species of damsel bug in the family Nabidae found in North America.
