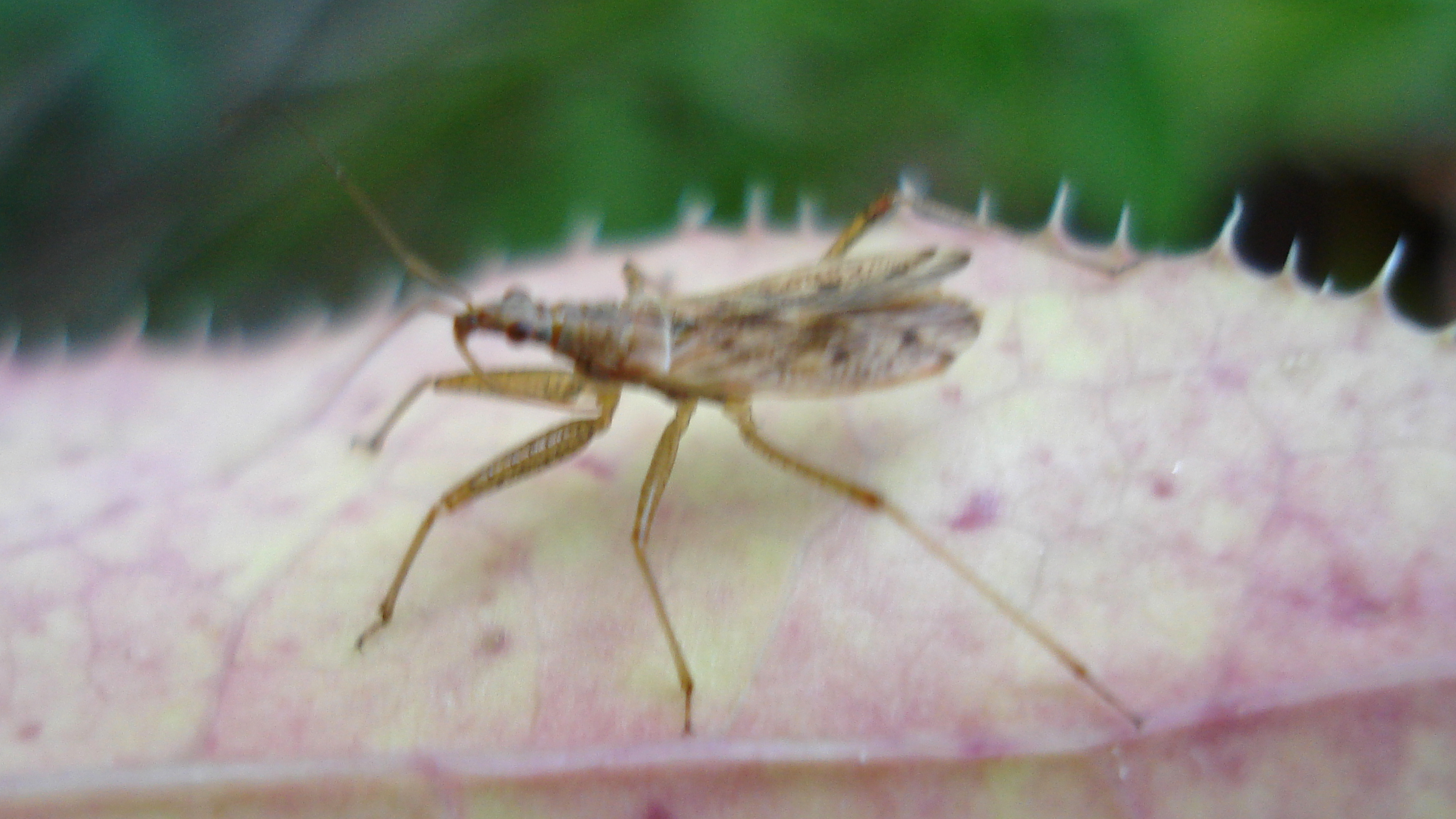

Scientific classification
- Domain: Eukaryota
- Kingdom: Animalia
- Phylum: Arthropoda
- Class: Insecta
- Order: Hemiptera
- Suborder: Heteroptera
- Family: Nabidae
- Genus: Nabis
- Species: N. roseipennis

Binomial name
- Nabis roseipennis Reuter, 1872

= Nabis roseipennis =

Species of true bug

Nabis roseipennis is a species of damsel bug in the family Nabidae. It is found in North America.
