= Nabis ancora =

Scientific classification
- Kingdom: Animalia
- Phylum: Arthropoda
- Clade: Pancrustacea
- Class: Insecta
- Order: Hemiptera
- Suborder: Heteroptera
- Family: Nabidae
- Genus: Nabis
- Species: N. ancora

Binomial name
- Nabis ancora Van Duzee, 1934

Species of true bug

Nabis ancora is a type of damsel bug in the family Nabidae.
