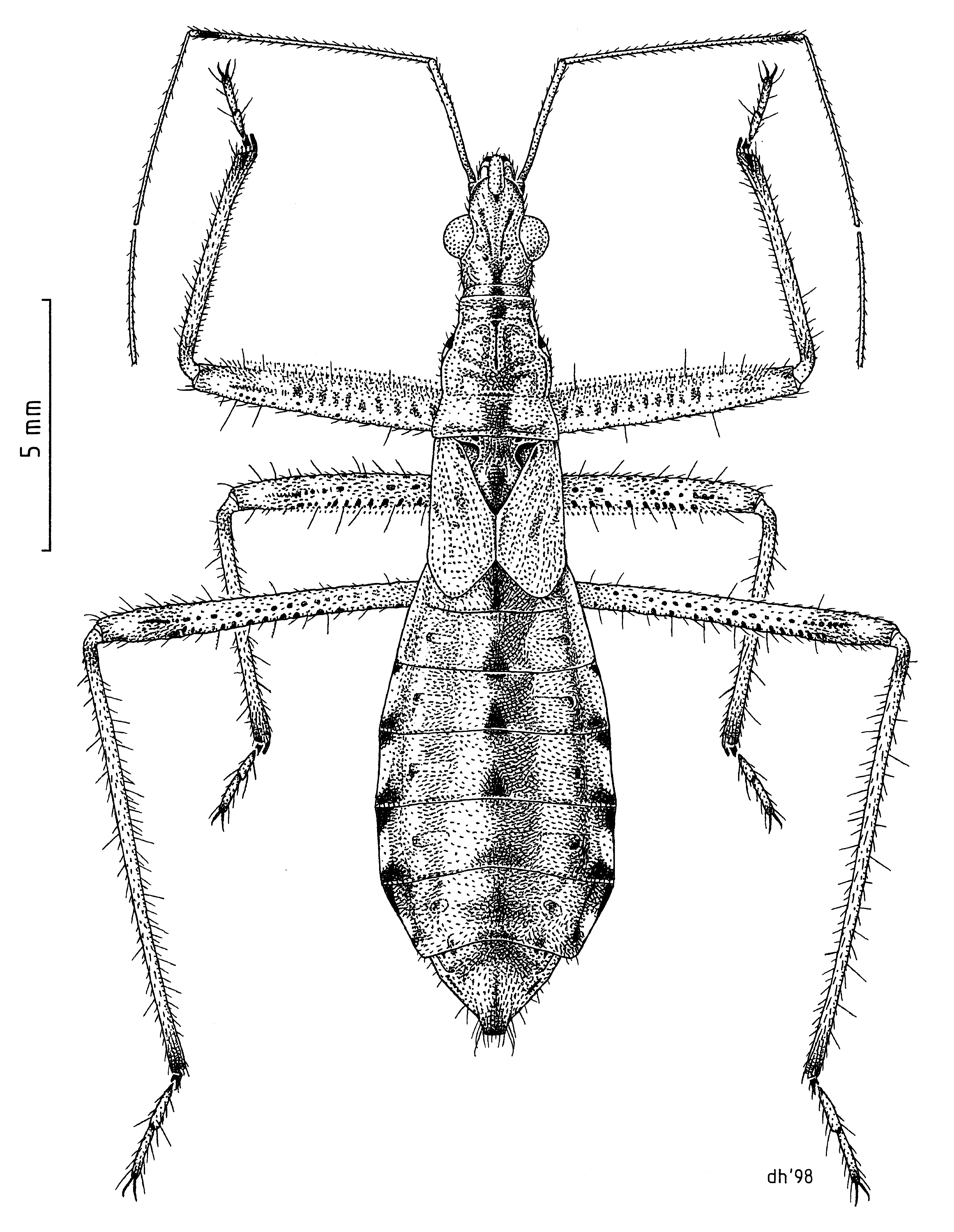

Scientific classification
- Kingdom: Animalia
- Phylum: Arthropoda
- Clade: Pancrustacea
- Class: Insecta
- Order: Hemiptera
- Suborder: Heteroptera
- Family: Nabidae
- Genus: Nabis
- Species: N. biformis

Binomial name
- Nabis biformis (Bergroth, 1927)

= Nabis biformis =

Species of true bug

Nabis biformis is a species within the Damsel bug (Nabidae) family. It is a winged, predatory insect native to southeastern parts of Australasia.

== Description ==
A small, dark brown slender insect that is 10-15mm in length. Nabis biformis, like other damsel bugs has a profile similar to that of a mantid with its upper body often arched upward with prominent forelegs.

Nabis biformis has both macropterous (long wings for efficient flight) and brachypterous (short wings or wing stubs, often unable to fly) forms with each form sharing similar head characteristics. The head is pale yellow but has darker areas behind eyes with a pale brown stripe between. The base of antennae is brown while antennal segments are darker yellow, gradually becoming paler near the apex. The topmost antennal segment retains a more brownish colour again. Eyes are a reddish-brown colour surrounded by short yellow hairs. Legs are yellowish with dark brown patches, covered in medium sized hairs and two rows of small teeth on the ventral side.

In its macropterous form, the upper thorax or pronotum is a pale yellow with darker brown markings and a large scutellum, wider than it is long. Hemelytra or forewings are long, covering the entire abdomen and there are small hairs prominent at the base. The hemelytra's membrane is transparent with darker veins. The abdomen under the forewings is brown and small hairs are present.

In its brachypterous form, it has a slightly smaller pronotum with more distinct darker brown stripes. The hemelytra are short, not functional and have no visible membrane. The abdomen is visible, mostly brown with yellow patches along the edge of abdomen and has a large dark brown median stripe.

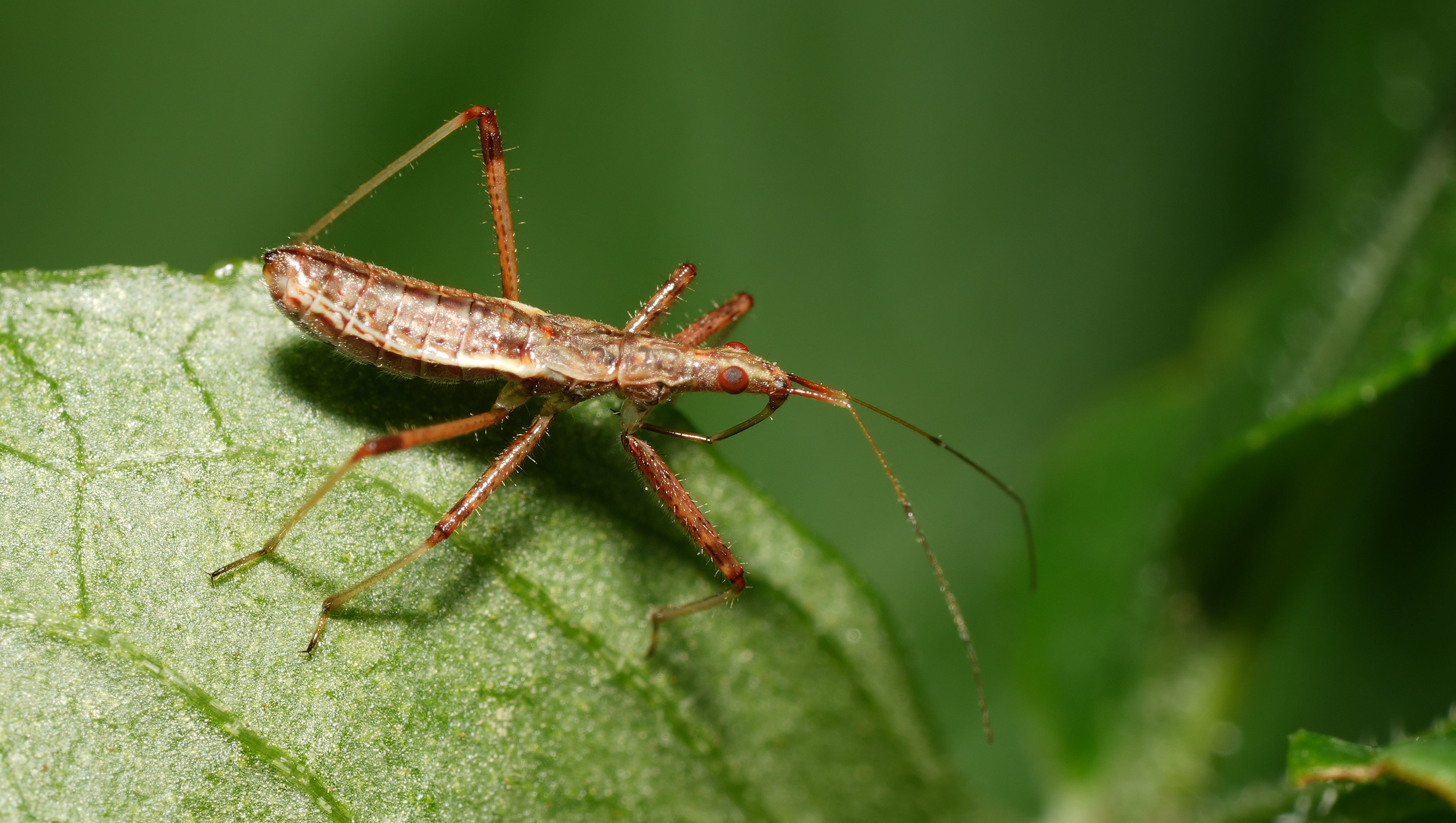
Nabis biformis crawling on a leaf in Leeston, New Zealand.

== Range ==
=== Natural global range ===
Nabis biformis is native to New Zealand and some southeastern parts of Australia, including Tasmania.

=== New Zealand range ===
The species occurs throughout the North and South Islands, as far north as Northland and as far south as Otago.

== Habitat ==
Nabis biformis is a terrestrial species that can be found predominantly along the edges of forested areas in both lowland and montane environments. Other members of the Nabis genus in New Zealand are known to prey upon aphids, which may explain why Nabis biformis is also often found in areas where crops are densely planted, especially Brassicas.

== Ecology ==
=== Life cycle and phenology ===
As a member of the Nabidae family, Nabis biformis undergoes three simple metamorphosis phases as an egg, nymph (usually with 5 separate instars) and adult. During the warmer months of the year a female lays her eggs, usually inside the tissues of shrubby, low-growing plants. This egg to adult cycle generally takes about 1-2 months to complete in a warm climate. Over the span of a year, roughly three generations complete this cycle, as overwintering occurs in mostly an adult or large nymph stage.

=== Diet and foraging ===
Nabis biformis is a terrestrial predator, alongside others in its family Nabidae. They are generalists that feed on any type of soft-bodied insects that are smaller than themselves, especially crop pests such as aphids, small caterpillars and plant hoppers. They can also live for 2 weeks without food if prey is scarce; however, they will often turn to cannibalism in this case. Their prominent raptorial forelegs, lined with small teeth, are used to capture and bind prey which they then suck the bodily fluids out of using their piercing mouthparts. Nabis biformis occasionally feed on plant matter if prey species are not abundant.

=== Predators, parasites and diseases ===
As a relatively understudied group of insects, damsel bugs including Nabis biformis do not have much literature on their diseases. Some reading suggests that they are preyed upon by generalist species such as some birds and parasitoids, and have also found to be infected by entomopathogenic fungi. As a native to NZ and Tasmania, we could expect Nabis biformis to be a prey species for insectivorous native birds such as Rhipidura fuliginosa, and perhaps even some generalist species of parasitoids.
