= Carthasis decoratus =

Scientific classification
- Domain: Eukaryota
- Kingdom: Animalia
- Phylum: Arthropoda
- Class: Insecta
- Order: Hemiptera
- Suborder: Heteroptera
- Family: Nabidae
- Subfamily: Nabinae
- Genus: Carthasis
- Species: C. decoratus

Binomial name
- Carthasis decoratus (Uhler, 1901)

Species of true bug

Carthasis decoratus is a species of damsel bug in the family Nabidae. It is found in North America.
