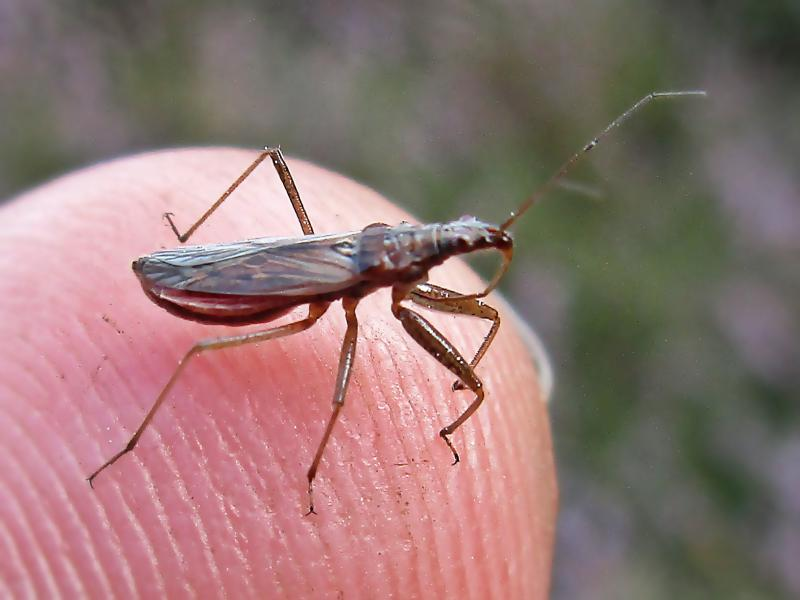

Scientific classification
- Kingdom: Animalia
- Phylum: Arthropoda
- Class: Insecta
- Order: Hemiptera
- Suborder: Heteroptera
- Family: Nabidae
- Genus: Nabis
- Species: N. ericetorum

Binomial name
- Nabis ericetorum Scholz, 1847

= Nabis ericetorum =

Species of true bug

Nabis ericetorum is a species of damsel bug in the family Nabidae.

== Occurrence and habitat ==
The species has its main distribution in parts of Europe influenced by the Atlantic climate and occurs in northern, western and central Europe and east to central and northern Russia. In the Mediterranean, it occurs only in the Iberian Peninsula. It rises in the Alps to about 1000 meters above sea level.

It is found on Calluna heaths, where both the nymphs and the imagines are well camouflaged by their colour.
