= N. americanus =

N. americanus may refer to:

- Nabis americanus, a minute pirate bug species
- Narceus americanus, a millipede species
- Necator americanus, a hookworm species
- Nicrophorus americanus, the American burying beetle or giant carrion beetle, a beetle species endemic to North America
- Numenius americanus, a bird species

== See also ==
- Americanus (disambiguation)
