= Hoplistoscelis heidemanni =

Scientific classification
- Domain: Eukaryota
- Kingdom: Animalia
- Phylum: Arthropoda
- Class: Insecta
- Order: Hemiptera
- Suborder: Heteroptera
- Family: Nabidae
- Tribe: Nabini
- Genus: Hoplistoscelis
- Species: H. heidemanni

Binomial name
- Hoplistoscelis heidemanni (Reuter, 1908)

Species of true bug

Hoplistoscelis heidemanni is a species of damsel bug in the family Nabidae. It is found in North America.
