= Nabis persimilis =

Scientific classification
- Kingdom: Animalia
- Phylum: Arthropoda
- Class: Insecta
- Order: Hemiptera
- Suborder: Heteroptera
- Family: Nabidae
- Genus: Nabis
- Species: N. persimilis

Binomial name
- Nabis persimilis Reuter, 1890

Species of true bug

Nabis persimilis is a species of damsel bug in the family Nabidae.
