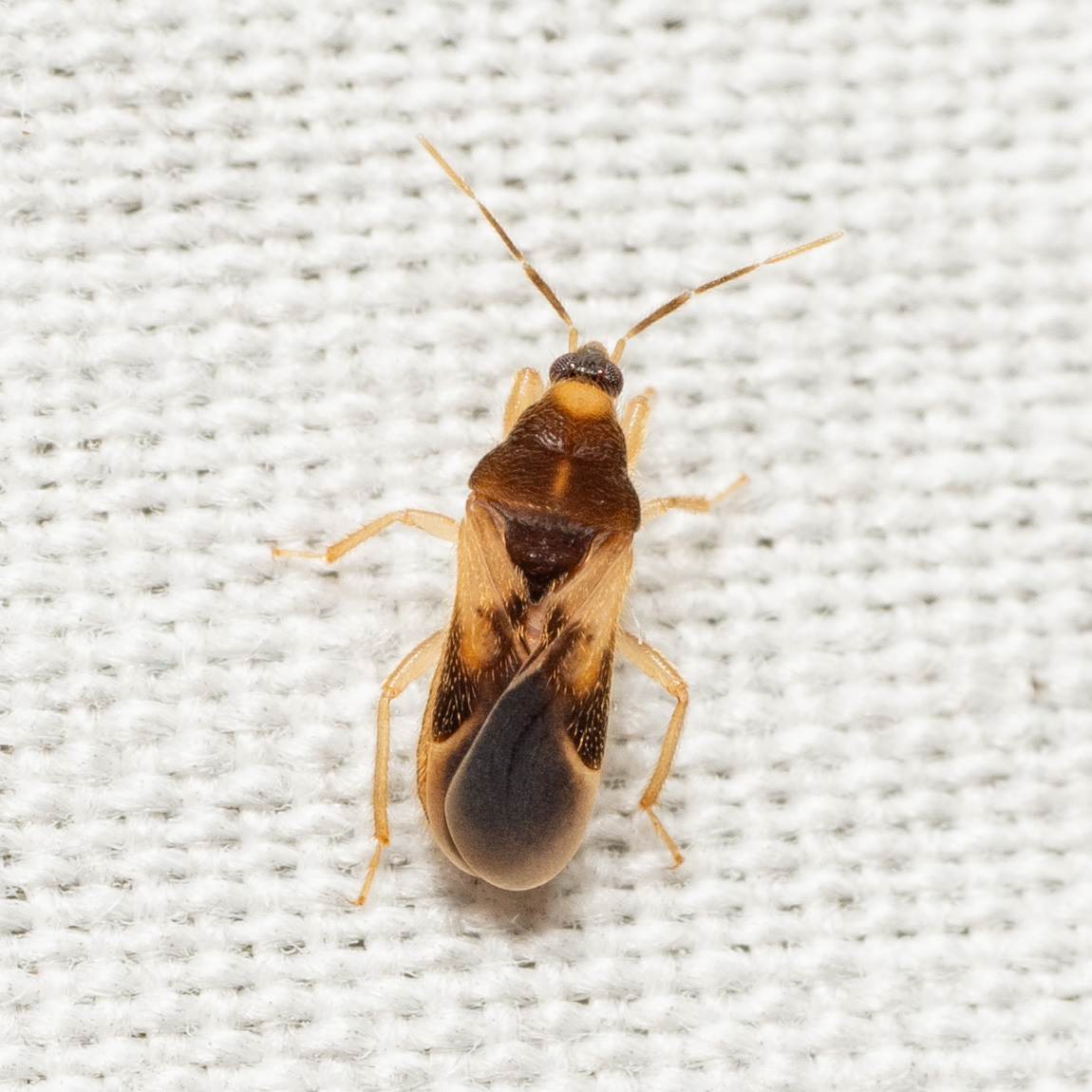

Scientific classification
- Kingdom: Animalia
- Phylum: Arthropoda
- Clade: Pancrustacea
- Class: Insecta
- Order: Hemiptera
- Suborder: Heteroptera
- Family: Nabidae
- Genus: Phorticus
- Species: P. collaris

Binomial name
- Phorticus collaris Stål, 1873

= Phorticus collaris =

Species of true bug

Phorticus collaris, the collared nabid, is a species of damsel bug in the family Nabidae. It is found in Central America and North America.
