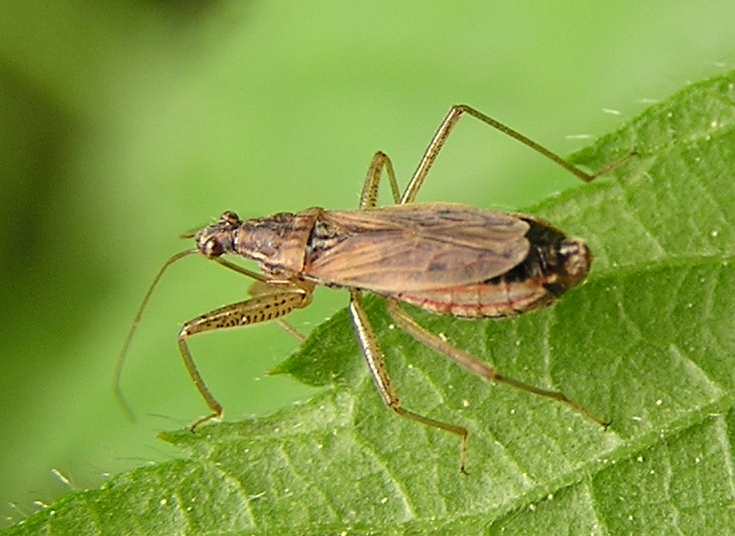
- Nabis rugosus

Scientific classification
- Kingdom: Animalia
- Phylum: Arthropoda
- Clade: Pancrustacea
- Class: Insecta
- Order: Hemiptera
- Suborder: Heteroptera
- Family: Nabidae
- Subfamily: Nabinae
- Tribe: Nabini
- Genus: Nabis; Latreille, 1802

Species
- See text.

= Nabis (bug) =

Genus of true bugs

Nabis is a genus of damsel bugs in the family Nabidae.

== Species ==
Nabis contains the following species:

- Nabis ancora Van Duzee, 1934
- Nabis argentinus Meyer-Dür, 1870
- Nabis blackburni White, 1978
- Nabis chinai Kerzhner, 1970
- Nabis chinensis Ren & Hsiao, 1981
- Nabis curtipennis Blackburn, 1888
- Nabis ealapaeoensis Kerzhner, 1968
- Nabis faminei Stål, 1859
- Nabis gagneorum Polhemus, 1999
- Nabis galapagoensis Kerzhner, 1968
- Nabis giffardi Van Duzee, 1936
- Nabis gracillimus Heer, 1865
- Nabis heissi Kerzhner, 2006
- Nabis himalayensis Ren, 1988
- Nabis hsiaoi Kerzhner, 1992
- Nabis kaohinani (Kirkaldy, 1909)
- Nabis kavahalu (Kirkaldy, 1907)
- Nabis kerasphoros (Kirkaldy, 1907)
- Nabis koelensis Blackburn, 1888
- Nabis lividus Heer, 1853
- Nabis lolupe (Kirkaldy, 1908)
- Nabis longipes Van Duzee, 1932
- Nabis lucidus Germar & Berendt, 1856
- Nabis lusciosus White, 1877
- Nabis maculata Heer, 1853
- Nabis morai (Kirkaldy, 1902)
- Nabis mumfordi Van Duzee, 1932
- Nabis nepalensis Kerzhner, 1992
- Nabis nesiotes (Kirkaldy, 1909)
- Nabis nigriventris Stal, 1862
- Nabis nubicola (Kirkaldy, 1909)
- Nabis nubigenus (Kirkaldy, 1908)
- Nabis nukuhiva Polhemus, 2002
- Nabis oscillans Blackburn, 1888
- Nabis paludicola (Kirkaldy, 1908)
- Nabis paranensis Harris, 1931
- Nabis pele (Kirkaldy, 1909)
- Nabis plicatulus Van Duzee, 1932
- Nabis procellaris (Kirkaldy, 1908)
- Nabis punctipennis Blanchard, 1852
- Nabis reductus Kerzhner, 1968
- Nabis renae Kerzhner, 2006
- Nabis roripes Stål, 1860
- Nabis rubritinctus Blackburn, 1888
- Nabis seticrus Harris, 1930
- Nabis sharpianus (Kirkaldy, 1902)
- Nabis silvicola (Kirkaldy, 1908)
- Nabis sordidus Reuter, 1872
- Nabis spinicrus (Reuter, 1890)
- Nabis subrufus White, 1877
- Nabis sylvestris (Kirkaldy, 1908)
- Nabis tandilensis (Berg, 1884)
- Nabis tarai (Kirkaldy, 1902)
- Nabis truculentus (Kirkaldy, 1908)
- Nabis vagabundus Heer, 1853

Subgenus Aspilaspis Stal, 1873

- Nabis indicus (Stal, 1873)
- Nabis pallidus Fieber, 1861
- Nabis viridulus Spinola, 1837

Subgenus Australonabis Strommer, 1988

- Nabis biformis (Bergroth, 1927)
- Nabis fraternus Kerzhner, 1970
- Nabis larvatus Kerzhner, 1970

Subgenus Dolichonabis Reuter, 1908

- Nabis americolimbatus (Carayon, 1961)
- Nabis limbatus Dahlbom, 1851
- Nabis majusculus (Kerzhner, 1968)
- Nabis nigrovittatus J. Sahlberg, 1878
- Nabis tesquorum (Kerzhner, 1968)
- Nabis valentinae Kerzhner, 2006

Subgenus Halonabis Reuter, 1890

- Nabis occidentalis (Kerzhner, 1963)
- Nabis sareptanus Dohrn, 1862
- Nabis sinicus (Hsiao, 1964)

Subgenus Limnonabis Kerzhner, 1968

- Nabis demissus (Kerzhner, 1968)
- Nabis lineatus Dahlbom, 1851
- Nabis ponticus (Kerzhner, 1962)
- Nabis propinquus (Reuter, 1872)
- Nabis sauteri (Poppius, 1915)
- Nabis ussuriensis (Kerzhner., 1962)

Subgenus Milu Kirkaldy, 1907

- Nabis apicalis Matsumura, 1913
- Nabis medogensis Ren, 1988
- Nabis potanini Bianchi, 1896
- Nabis reuteri Jakovlev, 1876
- Nabis semiferus Hsiao, 1964
- Nabis yulongensis Ren & G.Q. Liu, 1989

Subgenus Nabicula Kirby, 1837

- Nabis flavomarginatus Scholtz, 1847
- Nabis subcoleoptratus Kirby, 1837
- Nabis vanduzeei (Kirkaldy, 1901)

Subgenus Nabis Latreille, 1802

- Nabis brevis Scholz, 1847
- Nabis cinerascens Horváth, 1904
- Nabis consobrinus Bianchi, 1896
- Nabis edax Blatchely, 1929
- Nabis ericetorum Scholtz, 1847
- Nabis ferus (Linnaeus, 1758)
- Nabis hispanicus Remane, 1964
- Nabis intermedius Kerzhner, 1963
- Nabis mediterraneus Remane, 1962
- Nabis meridionalis Kerzhner, 1963
- Nabis mexicanus Remane, 1964
- Nabis palifer Seidenstücker, 1954
- Nabis persimilis Reuter, 1890
- Nabis provencalis Remane, 1953
- Nabis pseudoferus Remane, 1949
- Nabis punctatus A. Costa, 1847
- Nabis remanei Kerzhner, 1962
- Nabis reuterianus Puton, 1880
- Nabis riegeri Kerzhner, 1996
- Nabis roseipennis Reuter, 1872
- Nabis rufusculus Reuter, 1872
- Nabis rugosus (Linnaeus, 1758)
- Nabis sinoferus Hsiao, 1964
- Nabis stenoferus Hsiao, 1964
- Nabis wudingensis Ren, 1998

Subgenus Philobatus Kerzhner, 1968

- Nabis christophi Dohrn, 1862

Subgenus Reduviolus Kirby, 1837

- Nabis alternatus Parshley, 1922
- Nabis americanus Remane, 1964
- Nabis americoferus Carayon, 1961
- Nabis inscriptus (Kirby, 1837)
- Nabis kalmii Reuter, 1872

Subgenus Tropiconabis Kerzhner, 1968

- Nabis capsiformis Germar, 1838
- Nabis consimilis (Reuter, 1912)
- Nabis kinbergii Reuter, 1872
- Nabis latior Kerzhner & Henry, 2008
- Nabis maoricus Walker, 1873
