= Carthasis =

Scientific classification
- Kingdom: Animalia
- Phylum: Arthropoda
- Clade: Pancrustacea
- Class: Insecta
- Order: Hemiptera
- Suborder: Heteroptera
- Family: Nabidae
- Subfamily: Nabinae
- Genus: Carthasis; Champion, 1900

Synonyms
- Orthometrops Uhler, 1901

Genus of true bugs

Carthasis is a genus of damsel bugs in the family Nabidae. There are about five described species in Carthasis.

== Species ==
These five species belong to the genus Carthasis:

- Carthasis decoratus (Uhler, 1901)
- Carthasis distinctus Harris
- Carthasis gracilis Harris
- Carthasis rufonotatus Champion, 1900
- Carthasis uhleri Harris
