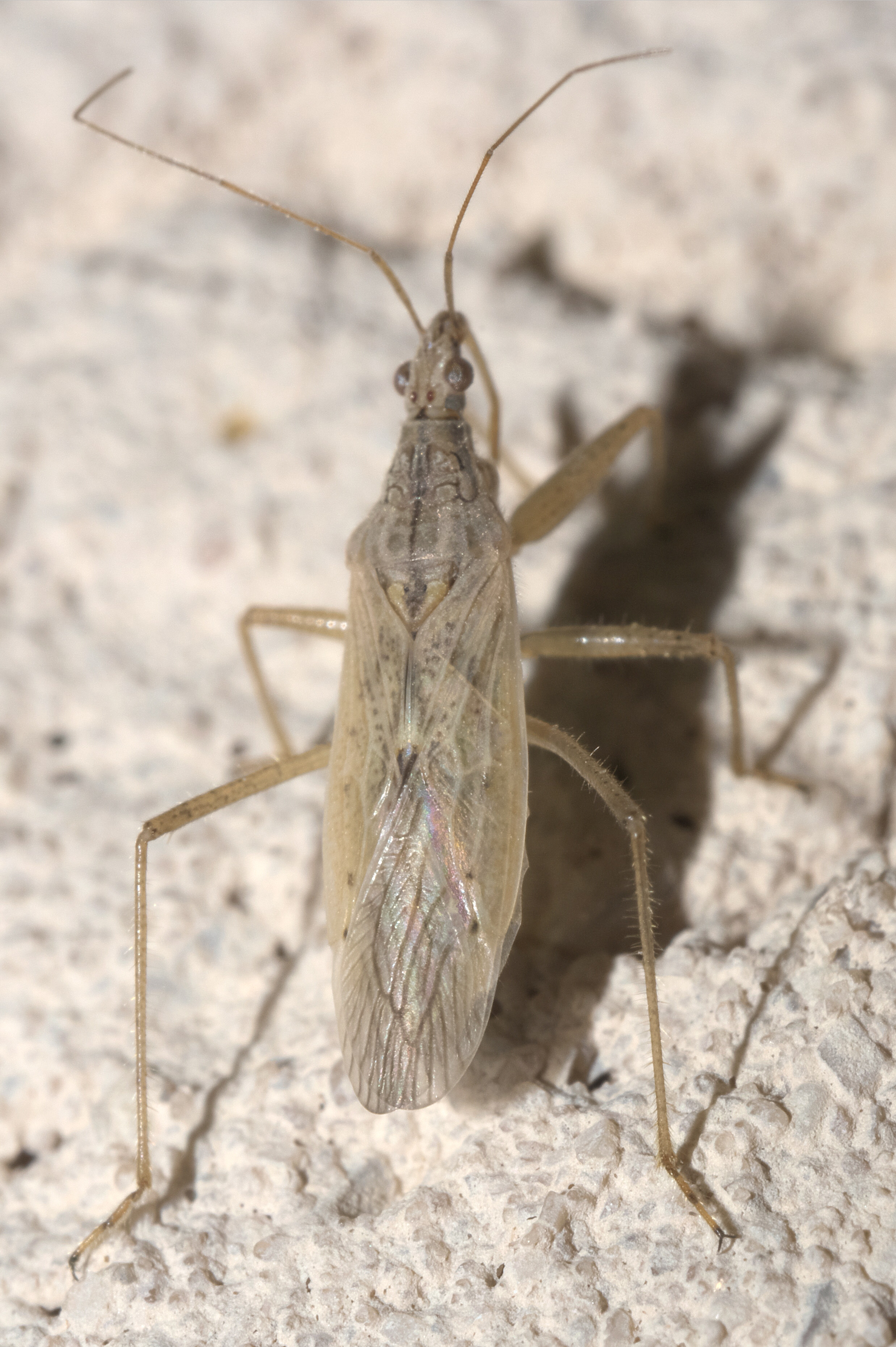

Scientific classification
- Domain: Eukaryota
- Kingdom: Animalia
- Phylum: Arthropoda
- Class: Insecta
- Order: Hemiptera
- Suborder: Heteroptera
- Family: Nabidae
- Genus: Nabis
- Species: N. americoferus

Binomial name
- Nabis americoferus Carayon, 1961

= Nabis americoferus =

Species of insect

Nabis americoferus, the common damsel bug, is a species of damsel bug in the family Nabidae. It is found in Central America and North America.
