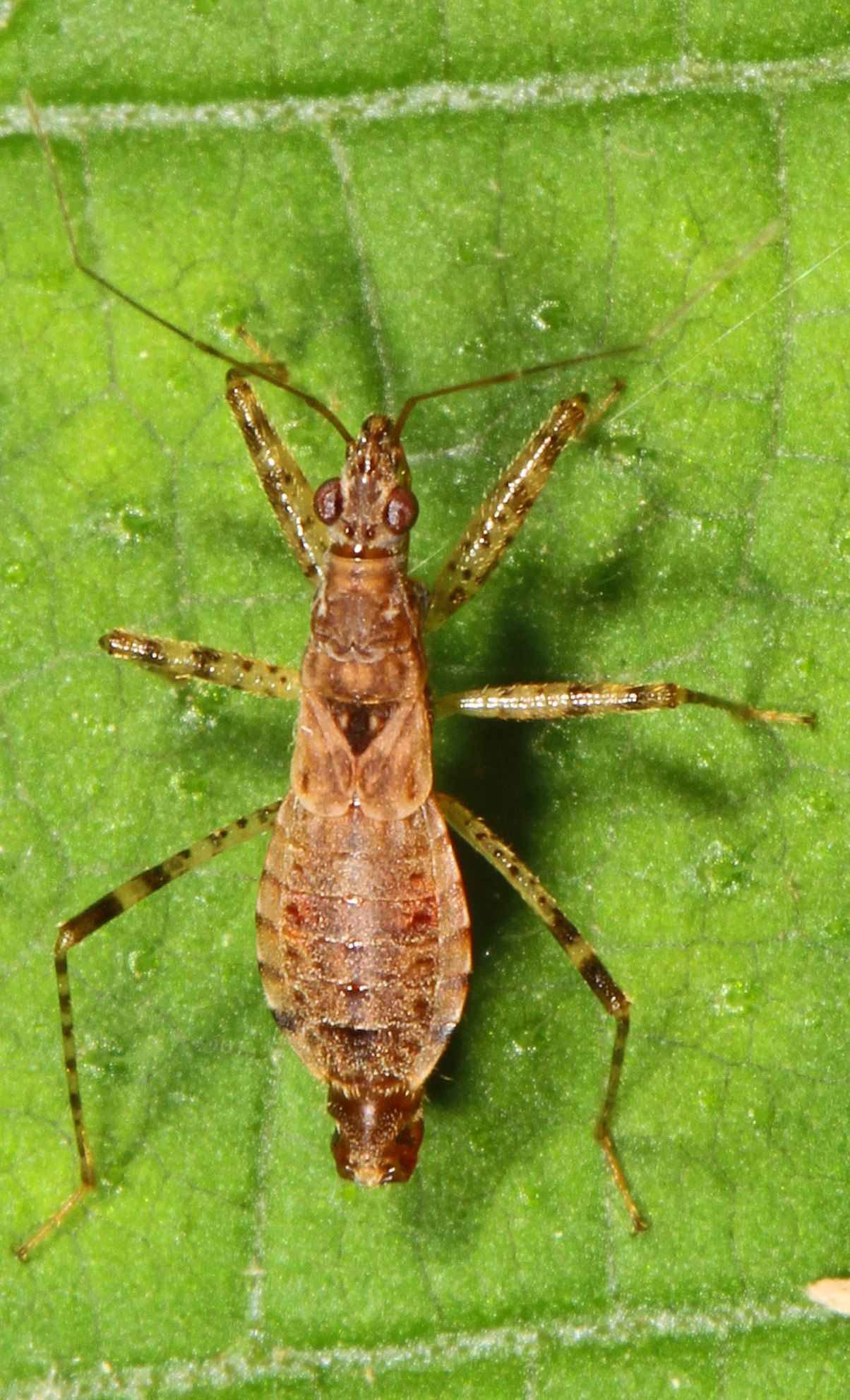
- Hoplistoscelis pallescens

Scientific classification
- Kingdom: Animalia
- Phylum: Arthropoda
- Clade: Pancrustacea
- Class: Insecta
- Order: Hemiptera
- Suborder: Heteroptera
- Family: Nabidae
- Subfamily: Nabinae
- Tribe: Nabini
- Genus: Hoplistoscelis; Reuter, 1890

= Hoplistoscelis =

Genus of true bugs

Hoplistoscelis is a genus of damsel bugs in the family Nabidae. There are about eight described species in Hoplistoscelis.

== Species ==
These eight species belong to the genus Hoplistoscelis:

- Hoplistoscelis confusa Kerzhner & Henry
- Hoplistoscelis dentipes (Harris, 1928)
- Hoplistoscelis heidemanni (Reuter, 1908)
- Hoplistoscelis hubbelli (Hussey, 1953)
- Hoplistoscelis nigriventris (Stål, 1862)
- Hoplistoscelis pallescens
- Hoplistoscelis sericans (Reuter, 1872)
- Hoplistoscelis sordidus (Reuter, 1872)
