= Metatropiphorus =

Scientific classification
- Kingdom: Animalia
- Phylum: Arthropoda
- Clade: Pancrustacea
- Class: Insecta
- Order: Hemiptera
- Suborder: Heteroptera
- Family: Nabidae
- Subfamily: Nabinae
- Tribe: Nabini
- Genus: Metatropiphorus; Reuter, 1872

Genus of true bugs

Metatropiphorus is a genus of damsel bugs in the family Nabidae. There are at least four described species in Metatropiphorus.

== Species ==
These four species belong to the genus Metatropiphorus:

- Metatropiphorus alvarengai Kerzhner, 1987
- Metatropiphorus belfragii Reuter, 1872
- Metatropiphorus drakei Harris
- Metatropiphorus tabidus Uhler
