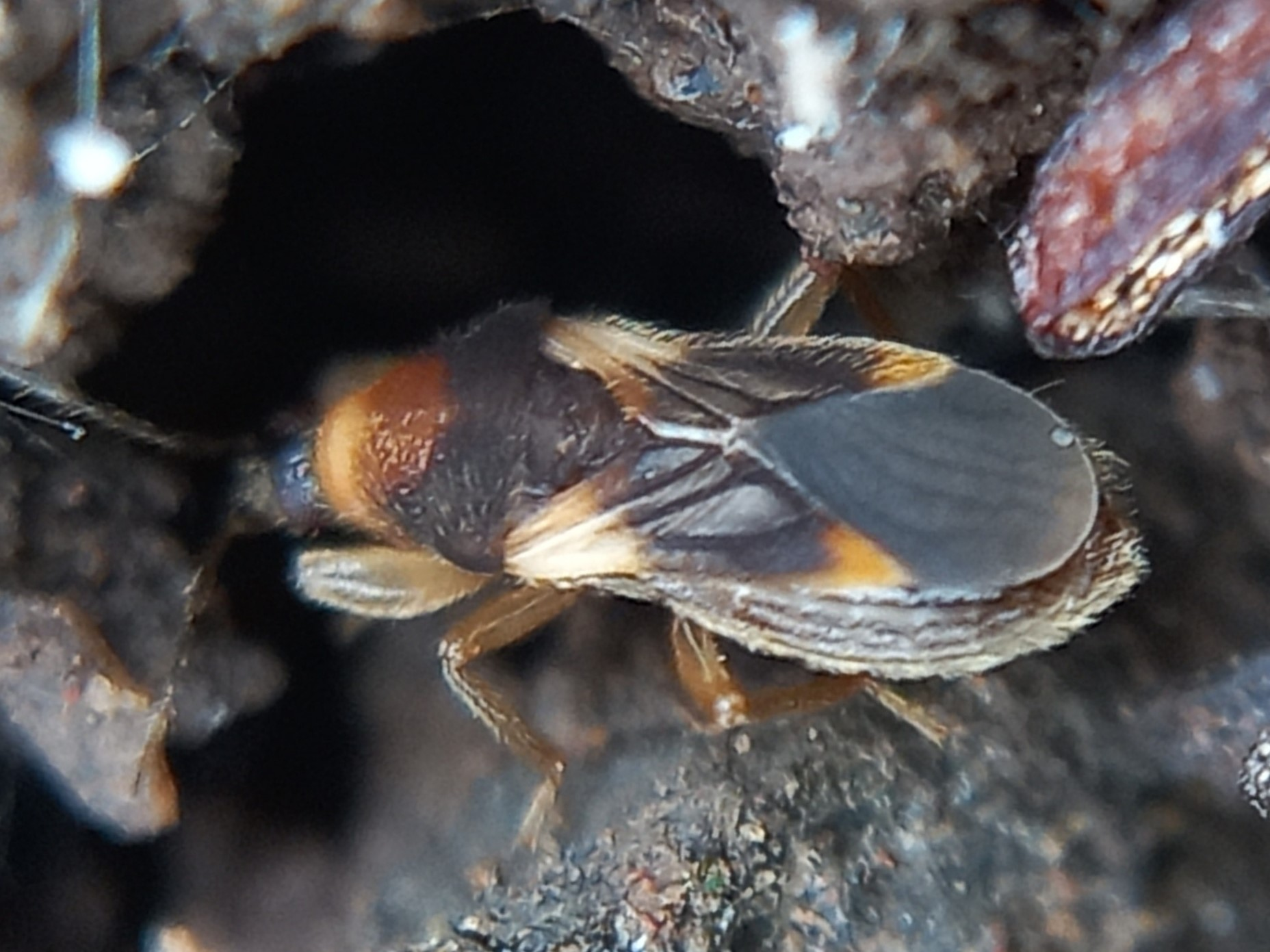
- Phorticus varicolor

Scientific classification
- Kingdom: Animalia
- Phylum: Arthropoda
- Clade: Pancrustacea
- Class: Insecta
- Order: Hemiptera
- Suborder: Heteroptera
- Family: Nabidae
- Subfamily: Prostemmatinae
- Genus: Phorticus; Stål, 1860

Species
- See text

= Phorticus =

Genus of true bugs

Phorticus is a genus of damsel bugs in the family Nabidae, consisting of at least ten described species.

== Species ==
The following species belong to the genus Phorticus:

- Phorticus affinis Poppius, 1915
- Phorticus collaris Stål, 1873 (collared nabid)
- Phorticus formosanus Poppius, 1915
- Phorticus obscuripes Stål, 1860
- Phorticus socialis Harris, 1940
- Phorticus speciosus Harris
- Phorticus varicolor Distant, 1919
- Phorticus variegatus Harris
- Phorticus velutinus Puton, 1895
- Phorticus viduus Stål, 1860
