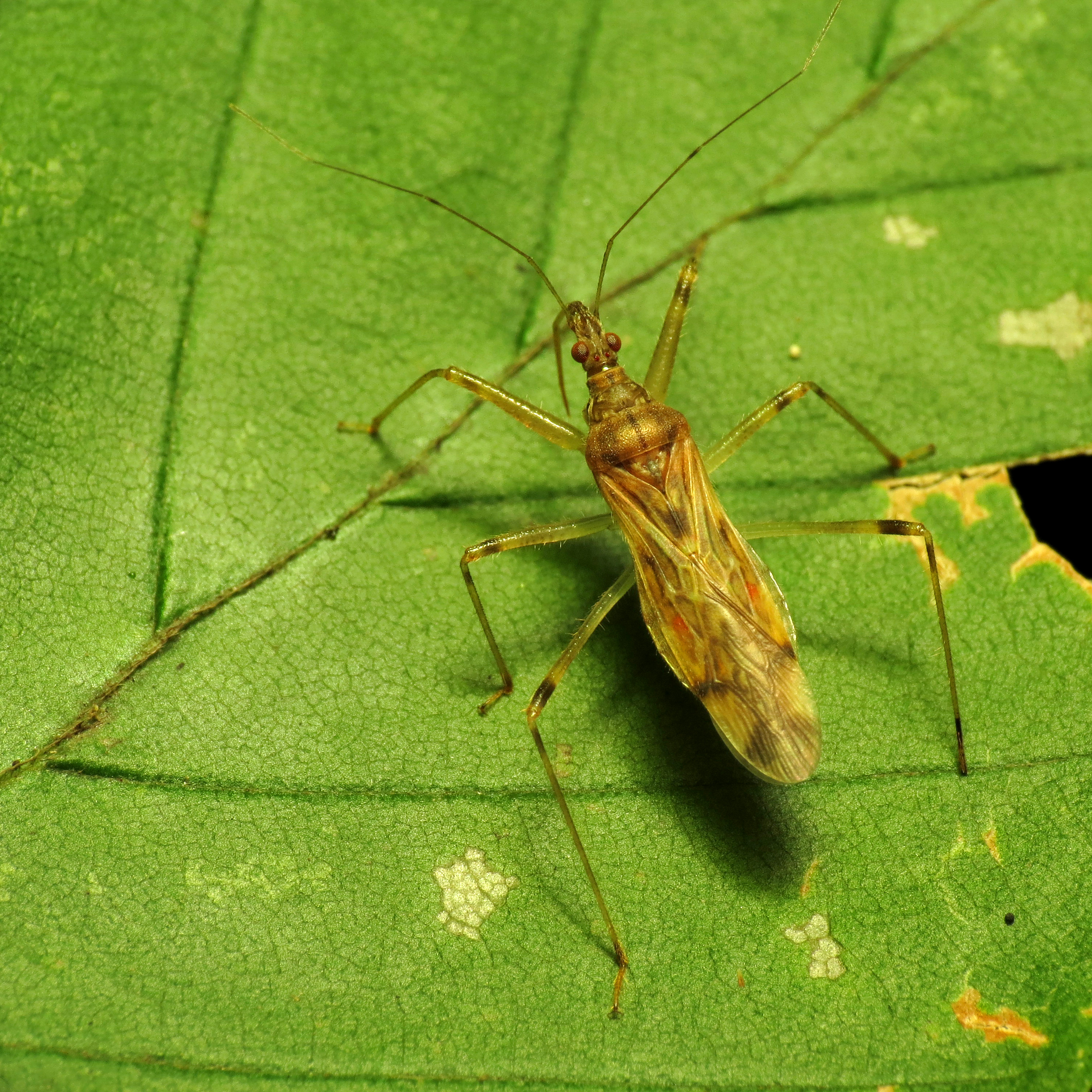
- Lasiomerus annulatus

Scientific classification
- Kingdom: Animalia
- Phylum: Arthropoda
- Clade: Pancrustacea
- Class: Insecta
- Order: Hemiptera
- Suborder: Heteroptera
- Family: Nabidae
- Tribe: Nabini
- Genus: Lasiomerus; Reuter, 1890

= Lasiomerus =

Genus of true bugs

Lasiomerus is a genus of damsel bugs in the family Nabidae. There are at least four described species in Lasiomerus.

== Species ==
These four species belong to the genus Lasiomerus:

- Lasiomerus andabata Kerzhner, 1992^{i c g}
- Lasiomerus annulatus (Reuter, 1872)^{i c g b}
- Lasiomerus constrictus (Champion, 1899)^{i c g}
- Lasiomerus spinicrus (Reuter, 1890)^{i c g}

Data sources: i = ITIS, c = Catalogue of Life, g = GBIF, b = Bugguide.net
