= Nabis alternatus =

Scientific classification
- Domain: Eukaryota
- Kingdom: Animalia
- Phylum: Arthropoda
- Class: Insecta
- Order: Hemiptera
- Suborder: Heteroptera
- Family: Nabidae
- Genus: Nabis
- Species: N. alternatus

Binomial name
- Nabis alternatus Parshley, 1922

Species of true bug

Nabis alternatus, the western damsel bug, is a species of damsel bug in the family Nabidae. It is found in Central America and North America.

== Subspecies ==
These two subspecies belong to the species Nabis alternatus:

- Nabis alternatus alternatus Parshley, 1922
- Nabis alternatus uniformis Harris, 1928
