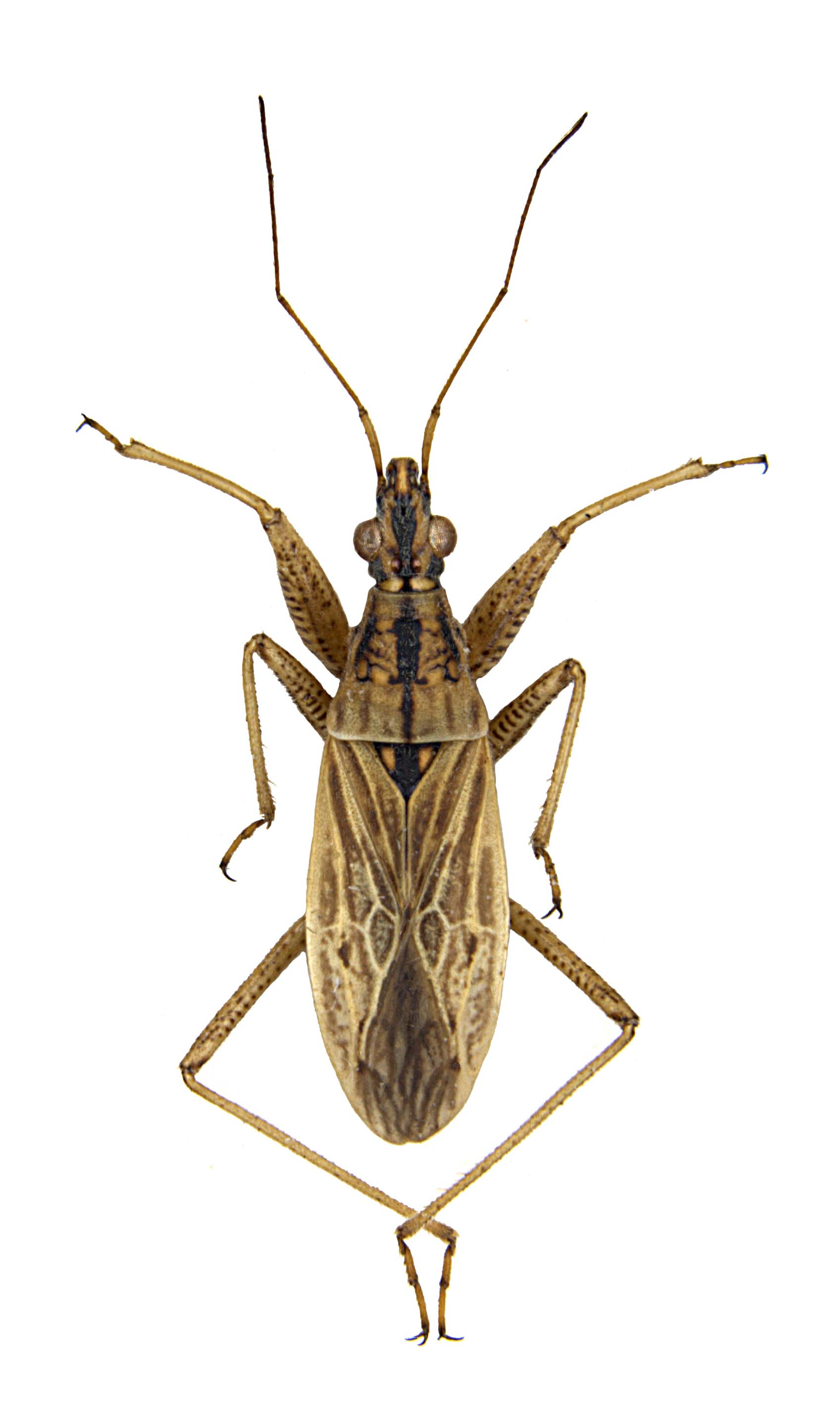
- Nabis rugosus specimen in Zoologische Staatssammlung München

Scientific classification
- Kingdom: Animalia
- Phylum: Arthropoda
- Class: Insecta
- Order: Hemiptera
- Suborder: Heteroptera
- Family: Nabidae
- Genus: Nabis
- Species: N. rugosus

Binomial name
- Nabis rugosus (Linnaeus, 1758)

= Nabis rugosus =

Species of true bug

Nabis rugosus, the common damsel bug, is a predatory true bug. The species is found in the Palearctic. It is found in Europe from the North edge of the Mediterranean to southern Scandinavia. Further east, the distribution extends east across the Palearctic to Central Asia and Siberia. The species occurs everywhere in Central Europe and is found in the lowlands, as well as in the central uplands and in the Alps up to about 1500 meters above sea level. It is Central Europe's most common species of sickle bug and it is found in many different habitats, open, dry, shaded and moist; but it prefers moderately moist, half shady places with dominant grass. Adjacent woodland vegetation is equally important.

Nabis rugosus is an active predator of almost any smaller insect, hunting on the ground, and also in the higher layer of herbs, rarely in the shrub layer.
