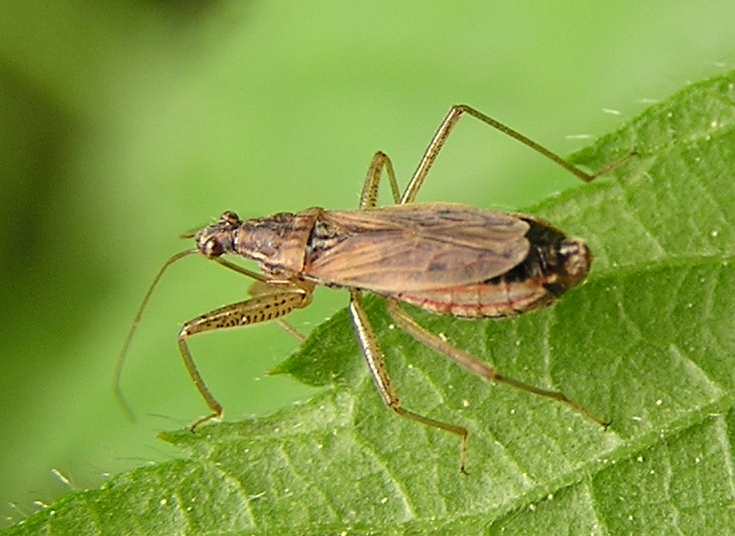
- Nabis rugosus

Scientific classification
- Kingdom: Animalia
- Phylum: Arthropoda
- Clade: Pancrustacea
- Class: Insecta
- Order: Hemiptera
- Suborder: Heteroptera
- Infraorder: Cimicomorpha
- Family: Nabidae; Costa, 1853

Subfamilies
- Nabinae; Prostemmatinae

= Nabidae =

Nabidae Temporal range: Cenomanian–Recent

Family of true bugs

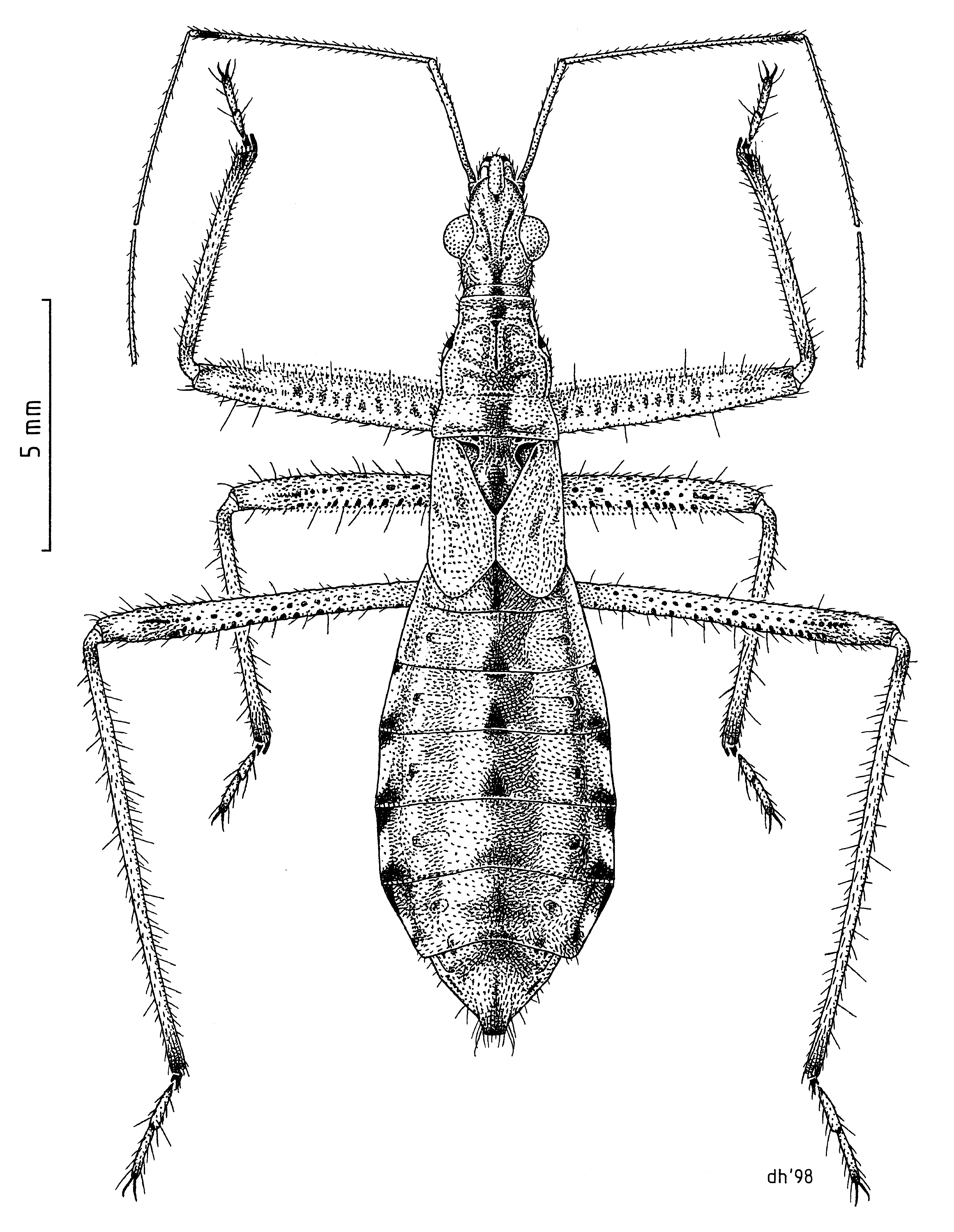
Nabis biformis

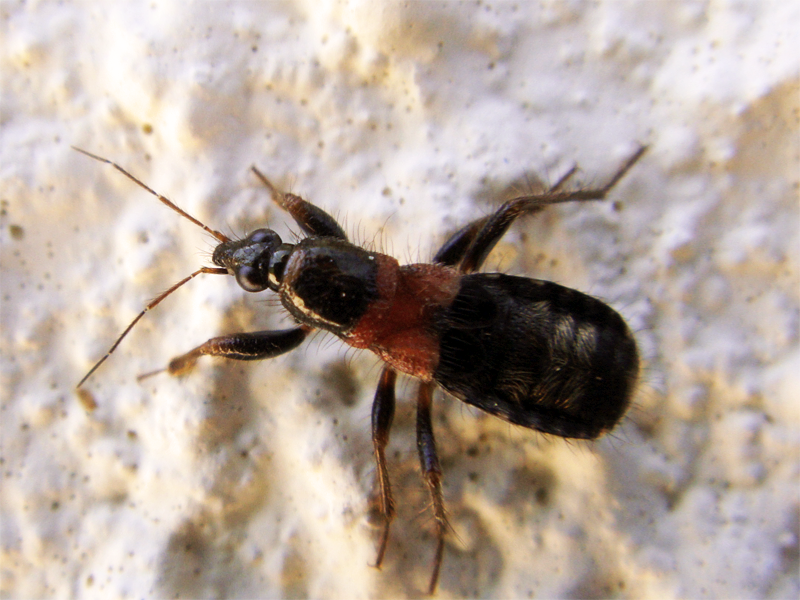
Prostemma albimacula

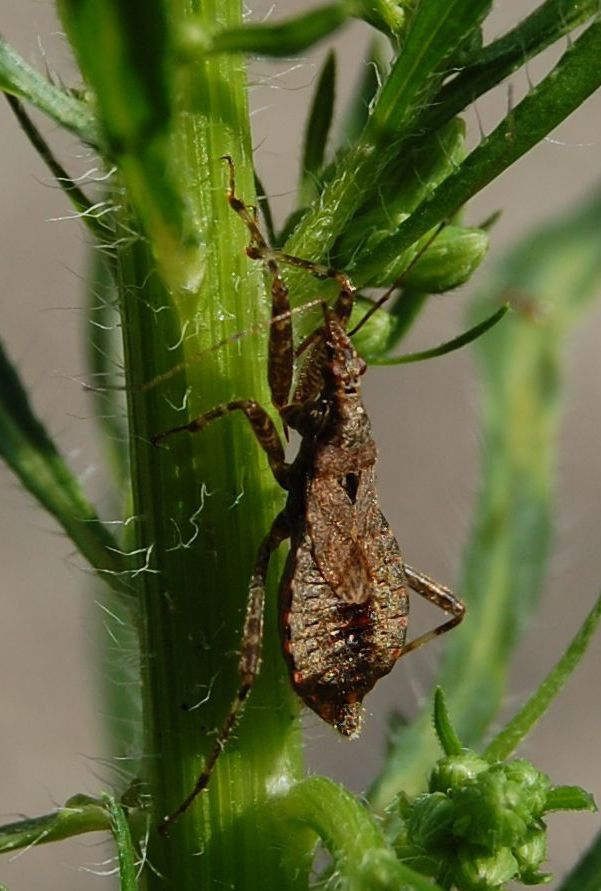
Himacerus apterus

The insect family Nabidae contains the damsel bugs. There are over 500 species in 20 genera. They are soft-bodied, elongate, winged terrestrial predators. Many damsel bugs catch and hold prey with their forelegs, similar to mantids. They are considered helpful species in agriculture because of their predation on many types of crop pests.

Damsel bugs of the genus Nabis are the most common. They and other genera are most numerous in fields of legumes such as alfalfa, but they can be found in many other crops and in non-cultivated areas. They are yellow to tan in color and have large, bulbous eyes and stiltlike legs. They are generalist predators, catching almost any insect smaller than themselves, and cannibalizing each other when no other food is available. Several species have bitten humans. Members of the subfamily Prostemmatinae reproduce by traumatic insemination.

== Genera ==
These 23 genera belong to the family Nabidae:

- Alloeorhynchus Fieber, 1860^{i c g b}
- Alloeorrhynchus^{c g}
- Anaptus Kerzhner, 1968^{i c g}
- Arachnocoris Scott, 1881^{g}
- Arbela Stål, 1865^{g}
- Carthasis Champion, 1900^{i c g b}
- Gorpis Stål, 1859^{g}
- Himacerus Wolff, 1811^{i c g b}
- Hoplistoscelis Reuter, 1890^{i c g b}
- Karanabis Bekker-Migdisova, 1963^{g}
- Lasiomerus Reuter, 1890^{i c g b}
- Metatropiphorus Reuter, 1872^{i c g b}
- Nabicula Kirby, 1837^{i c g}
- Nabis Latreille, 1802^{i c g b}
- Omanonabis Asquith and Lattin, 1991^{i c g}
- Pagasa Stål, 1862^{i c g b}
- Phorticus Stål, 1860^{i c g b}
- Praecarthasis Kerzhner, 1986^{g}
- Prostemma Laporte, 1832^{g}
- Reduviolus Kirby, 1837^{g}
- Rhamphocoris Kirkaldy, 1901^{g}
- Stalia
- Stenonabis Reuter, 1890^{g}

Data sources: i = ITIS, c = Catalogue of Life, g = GBIF, b = Bugguide.net

== Evolutionary history ==
Several fossil genera have been attributed to the family, including Karanabis from the Upper Jurassic Karabastau Formation of Kazakhstan, but it has subsequently been assigned to other families. The earliest definitive record of the family is Cretanazgul from the Cenomanian aged Burmese amber of Myanmar, belonging to the subfamily Prostemmatinae.
