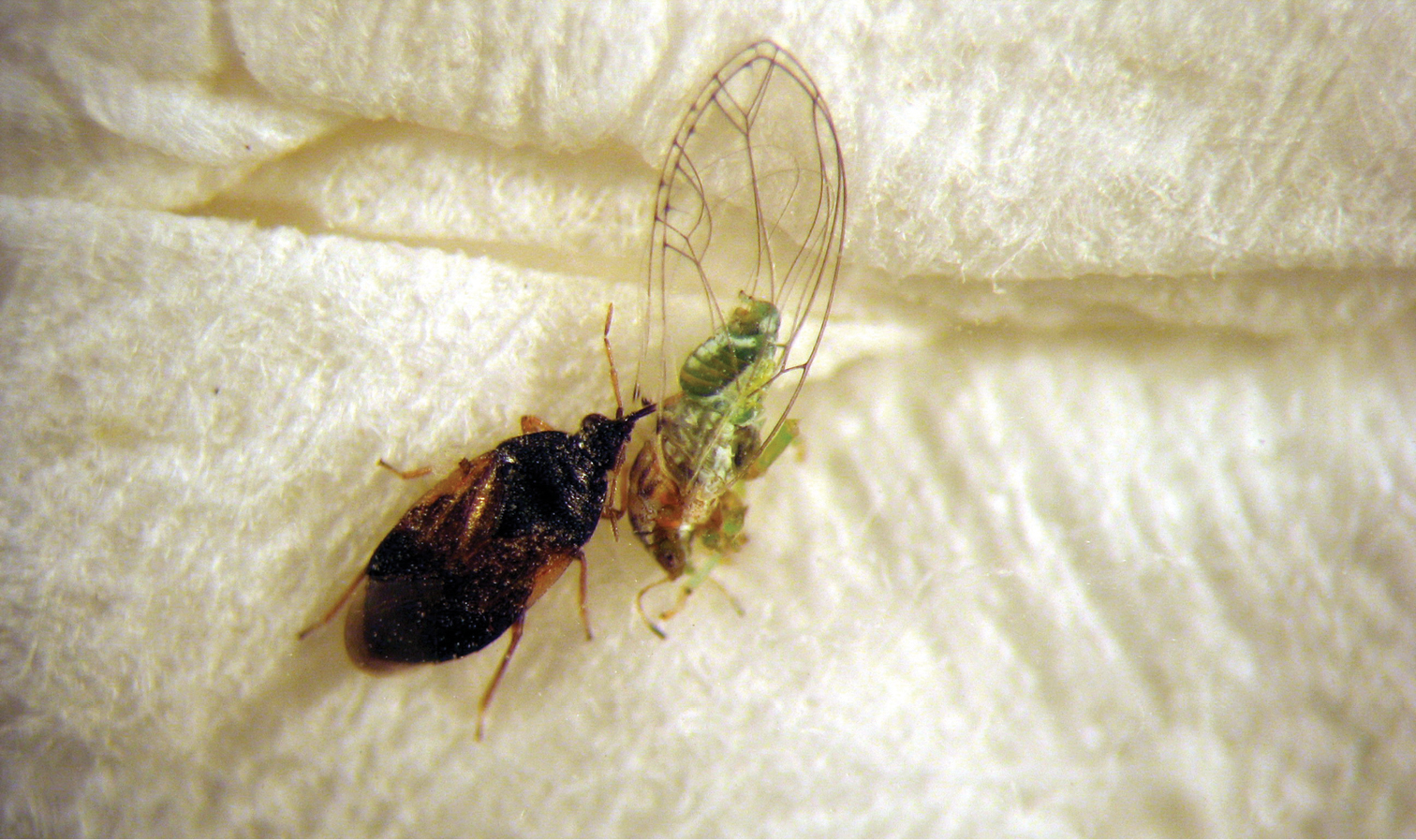
- Orius minutus feeding on Trioza rhamni.

Scientific classification
- Kingdom: Animalia
- Phylum: Arthropoda
- Clade: Pancrustacea
- Class: Insecta
- Order: Hemiptera
- Suborder: Heteroptera
- Family: Anthocoridae
- Genus: Orius
- Species: O. minutus

Binomial name
- Orius minutus (Wolff, 1811)

= Orius minutus =

Species of minute pirate bug

Orius minutus is a Palearctic species of minute pirate bug in the family Anthocoridae. O. minutus is naturally distributed throughout Europe, western Russia, North Africa, China, Japan, and Siberia The predatory bug was accidentally introduced into North America through plant material commerce and regular dispersal; the introduction of O. minutus is generally considered beneficial to the agricultural industry. O. minutus is an important addition to the predator complex of many crops, and its role as a non-commercialized biological control agent highlights its unique contribution to pest management strategies.

== Diagnostics ==
=== Adults ===
Adult females of O. minutus are larger (2.05-2.60 mm total length) and more broadly ovate (0.85-0.97 mm pronotal width) than males, who are slenderer (0.7-0.82 mm pronotal width) and possess thicker antennae. The heads range from dark brown to black, all sporting yellow antennae. The pronotum and scutellum are brownish-grey to brownish-black, with the hardened forewings yellowish brown. The underside and hind legs are dark brown to black, with the front and middle legs yellow. Lengths of golden setae adorn the dorsal side of the insect.

=== Nymphs ===
Fifth instar nymphs of O. minutus are differentiated from other members of the genus Orius (e.g. O. tristicolor) by their broadly ovate body shape with one-third of the wing pad's tip a much darker colour than the rest of the dorsum. The maximum width of the pronotum is 0.70 mm or greater.

It is difficult to differentiate between earlier instars; many members of the genus Orius are a creamy white colour prior to their fifth instar. However, O. minutus are generally more robust and broader than other species. Their eyes nearly touch the anterior margin of the pronotum. The head is relatively short, with the protunum almost 1.5 times the width of the head.

== Reproduction ==
=== Mating ===
O. minutus females are functionally monandrous. Generally, females can not be inseminated by one mating; only if the first mating fails will the females choose to mate with another male. Females will refuse unwanted mating attempts by lifting their ovipositors and struggling; such behaviours suggest females control the functional monandry. The number of unique male partners does not affect fecundity, though mating with a single male decreases the hatching success of eggs. Males are polygamous and can inseminate at least three females at a rate of one female per day; the insemination ability of males persists for at least three copulations.

Unlike many members of Anthocoridae, traumatic insemination does not occur within O. minutus. Males instead employ extragenital insemination to transfer spermatozoa into the female's body. The male's needle-like flagellum is inserted intersegmentally between the female's abdominal segments without wounding or scarring her outer body; the cone present on male genitalia assists in expanding the space between the female's lower abdominal segments. Males possess a partially sclerotized copulatory tube to support and guide the flagellum into the female's sperm pouch. The spermatozoa can remain within the sperm pouch weeks after depositing several eggs, suggesting the sperm pouch functions as a long-term storage organ. Females may be able to store spermatozoa for their entire lifetime, a consequence of functional monandry. An extragenital structure called the ectospermalege is located at the fourth segment of the female body. Underneath the ectospermalege is the mesospermalege, a special endodermal pouch that receives the spermatozoa. O. minutus females lack spermatheca, instead possessing a pair of pseudospermatheca at the base of their lateral oviducts; the pseudospermatheca receives the spermatozoa, which transfers from the mesospermalege in the hemolymph.

=== Pheromones ===
Contact sex pheromones are present within the trails of O. minutus. Trails left by mature virgin females aid males in locating a mate. Males will linger on leaves exposed to trails left by mature virgin females, allowing males to locate conspecific females who had recently deposited trails on the plant. Males will respond to the trails regardless of their mating experience, though only trails from mature females arrest males. Females respond with weak arrestment to the leaves walked on by males, which could further assist in finding a mate.

=== Effect of temperature ===
Although O. minutus have a higher rate of reproduction at temperatures between 17 and 26 °C, they experience a decrease in lifetime fecundity at and above temperatures of 26 °C; the reduction in fecundity at higher temperatures suggests that O. minutus are disadvantaged when experiencing wide ranges of temperatures.

== Life history ==
O. minutus females overwinter fertilized, usually emerging from hibernation in the early spring. Males can hibernate but are unlikely to survive the winter due to their lack of diapause and inadequate lipid accumulation. Shortly after hibernation ends, eggs are deposited onto the base of developing flower buds or the midrib on the bottom of leaves.

O. minutus has five nymphal instars. The developmental time from egg to adult depends on temperature and location, though adulthood is generally reached within 24 to 30 days. O. minutus produce at least two generations annually, though up to four generations can be produced under ideal conditions. Adults collected from early spring and mid-autumn suggest O. minutus is bivoltine.

== Diet ==
O. minutus are generalist predators of small insects, including aphids, mites, thrips, whiteflies and scales. Though chiefly predacious, O. minutus may occasionally feed on plant material and sap (e.g. the fluid produced by Eryngium campestre).

== Behaviour ==
=== Foraging and flying ===
Though O. minutus initially flies out in random directions, the discovery of prey patches shifts their dispersal into foraging activity; individuals that discover patches with a high prey density are hesitant to fly out from the patches. Abiotic factors significantly influence this behaviour, with increased plant foraging behaviours correlating with high solar radiation and low humidity. Both males and females are diurnal fliers, though females engage in less flight activity than males.

=== Diapause ===
The critical photoperiod for inducing diapause is between 14.5-9.5D and 15L-9D at 22 °C, corresponding to late summer in many regions occupied by O. minutus. During diapause, the insects do not copulate, and the female's ovaries remain small until the following spring. Adult females do not enter diapause regardless of short day length if their nymphal stages were spent under long day length. Adult diapause is not induced in males due to a shortage of lipid accumulation.
