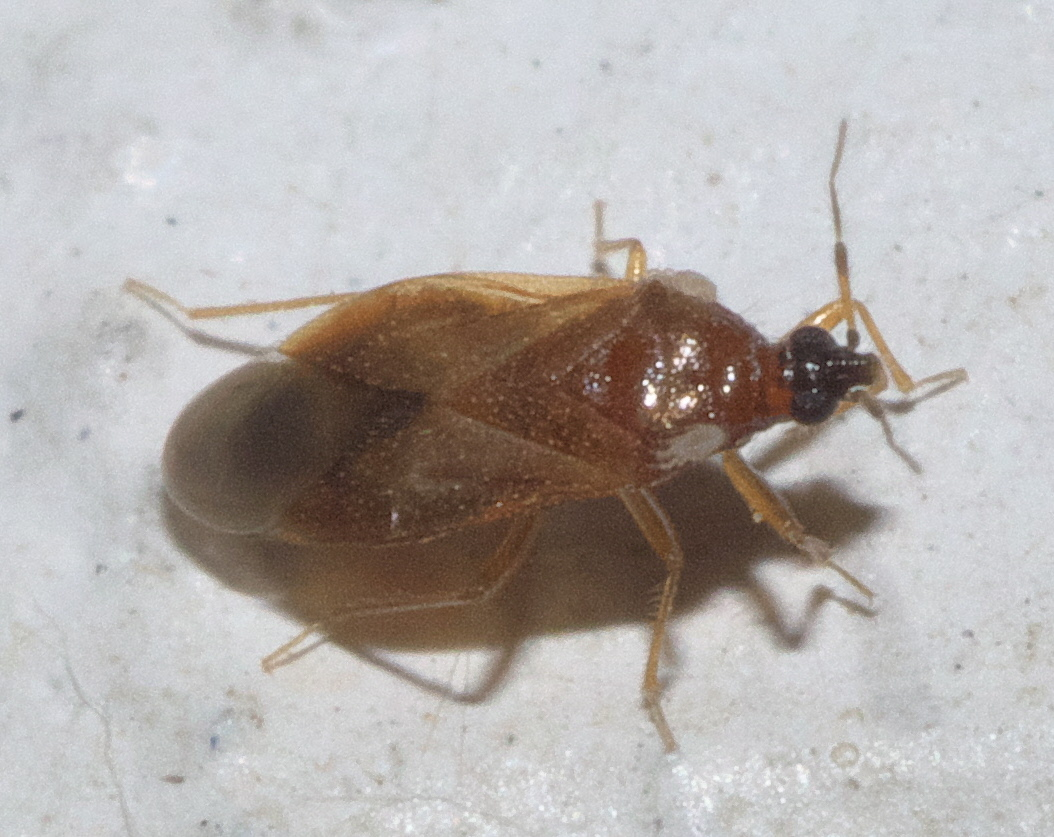
- From Oklahoma, US

Scientific classification
- Kingdom: Animalia
- Phylum: Arthropoda
- Clade: Pancrustacea
- Class: Insecta
- Order: Hemiptera
- Suborder: Heteroptera
- Family: Anthocoridae
- Genus: Lasiochilus
- Species: L. pallidulus

Binomial name
- Lasiochilus pallidulus Reuter, 1871

= Lasiochilus pallidulus =

Species of true bug

Lasiochilus pallidulus is a species of true bug in the family Lasiochilidae. It is found in the Caribbean Sea, Central America, and North America. It is known to be a predator of eggs and early instars of Blissus insularis.
