= Acompocoris pygmaeus =

Scientific classification
- Kingdom: Animalia
- Phylum: Arthropoda
- Clade: Pancrustacea
- Class: Insecta
- Order: Hemiptera
- Suborder: Heteroptera
- Family: Anthocoridae
- Genus: Acompocoris
- Species: A. pygmaeus

Binomial name
- Acompocoris pygmaeus (Fallén, 1807)

Synonyms
- Lygaeus pygmaeus Fallén, 1807

Species of true bug

Acompocoris pygmaeus is a species of minute pirate bug in the family Anthocoridae. It is found in Europe and Northern Asia (excluding China) and North America. It is associated with Scots pine.
