= Cardiastethus assimilis =

Scientific classification
- Domain: Eukaryota
- Kingdom: Animalia
- Phylum: Arthropoda
- Class: Insecta
- Order: Hemiptera
- Suborder: Heteroptera
- Family: Anthocoridae
- Genus: Cardiastethus
- Species: C. assimilis

Binomial name
- Cardiastethus assimilis (Reuter, 1871)

Species of true bug

Cardiastethus assimilis is a species of minute pirate bug in the family Anthocoridae. It is found in the Caribbean and North America.
