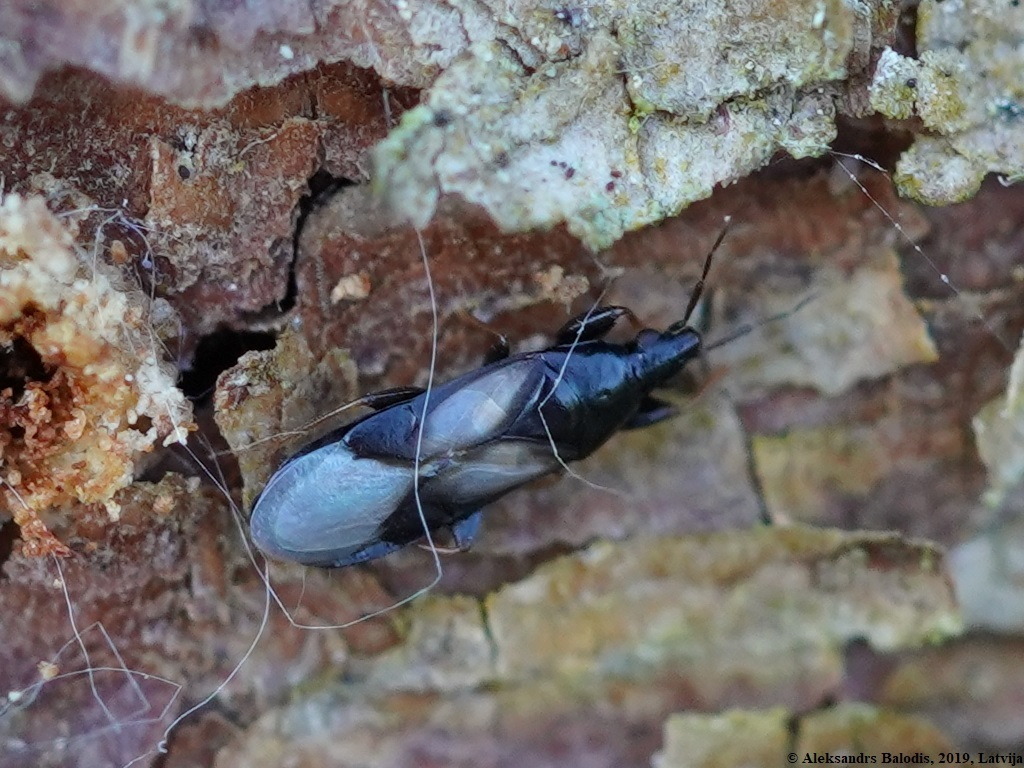

Scientific classification
- Domain: Eukaryota
- Kingdom: Animalia
- Phylum: Arthropoda
- Class: Insecta
- Order: Hemiptera
- Suborder: Heteroptera
- Family: Anthocoridae
- Genus: Scoloposcelis
- Species: S. pulchella

Binomial name
- Scoloposcelis pulchella (Zetterstedt, 1838)

Synonyms
- Scoloposcelis crassipes (Flor, 1860); Xylocoris crassipes Flor, 1860

= Scoloposcelis pulchella =

Species of true bug

Scoloposcelis pulchella is a species of bugs in the family Anthocoridae. It is found in Europe and Northern Asia (excluding China) and North America.
