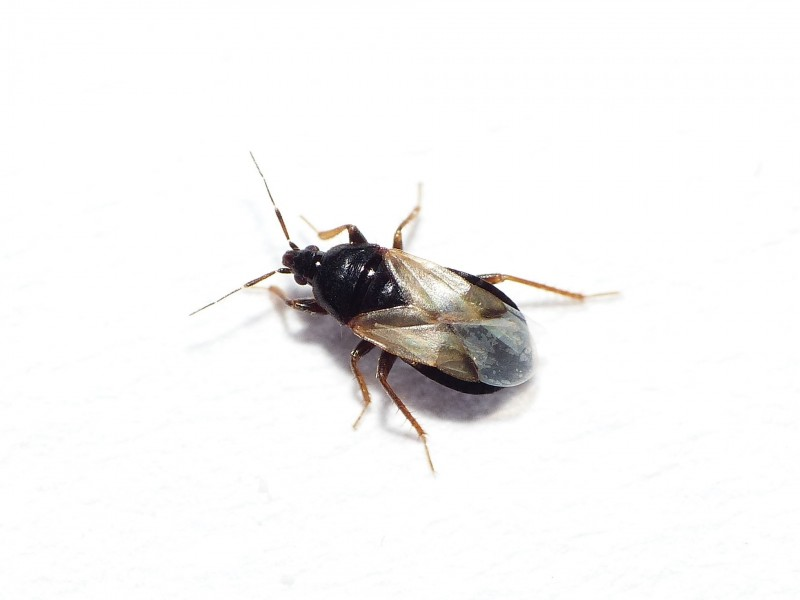

Scientific classification
- Kingdom: Animalia
- Phylum: Arthropoda
- Class: Insecta
- Order: Hemiptera
- Suborder: Heteroptera
- Family: Anthocoridae
- Genus: Xylocoris
- Species: X. galactinus

Binomial name
- Xylocoris galactinus (Fieber, 1837)

Synonyms
- Xylocoris discalis (Van Duzee, 1914)

= Xylocoris galactinus =

Species of true bug

Xylocoris galactinus is a species of bugs in the family Anthocoridae. It is found in Europe & Northern Asia (excluding China), North America, and Oceania.

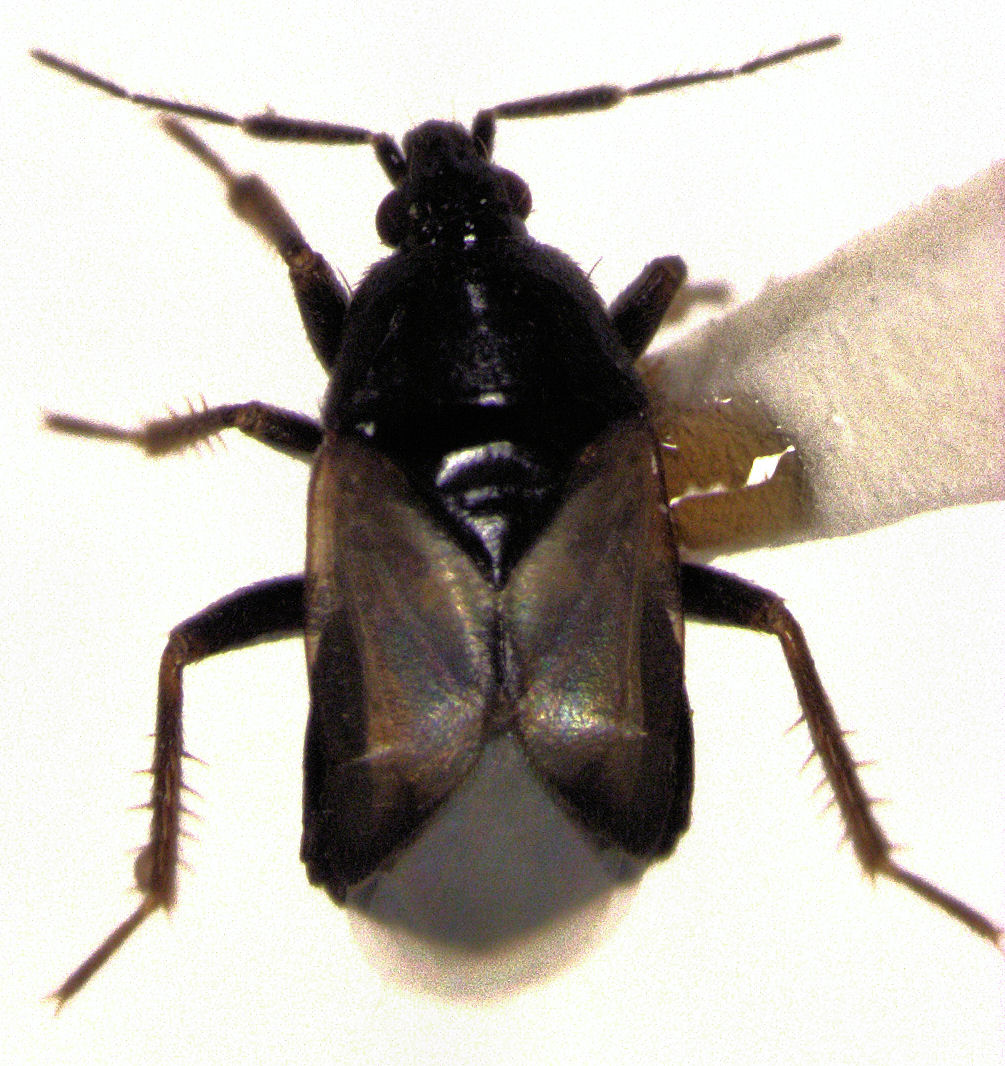
