= Xylocoris californicus =

Scientific classification
- Domain: Eukaryota
- Kingdom: Animalia
- Phylum: Arthropoda
- Class: Insecta
- Order: Hemiptera
- Suborder: Heteroptera
- Family: Anthocoridae
- Genus: Xylocoris
- Species: X. californicus

Binomial name
- Xylocoris californicus (Reuter, 1884)

Synonyms
- Xylocoris umbrinus Van Duzee, 1921

Species of true bug

Xylocoris californicus is a species of bugs in the family Anthocoridae. It is found in North America.
