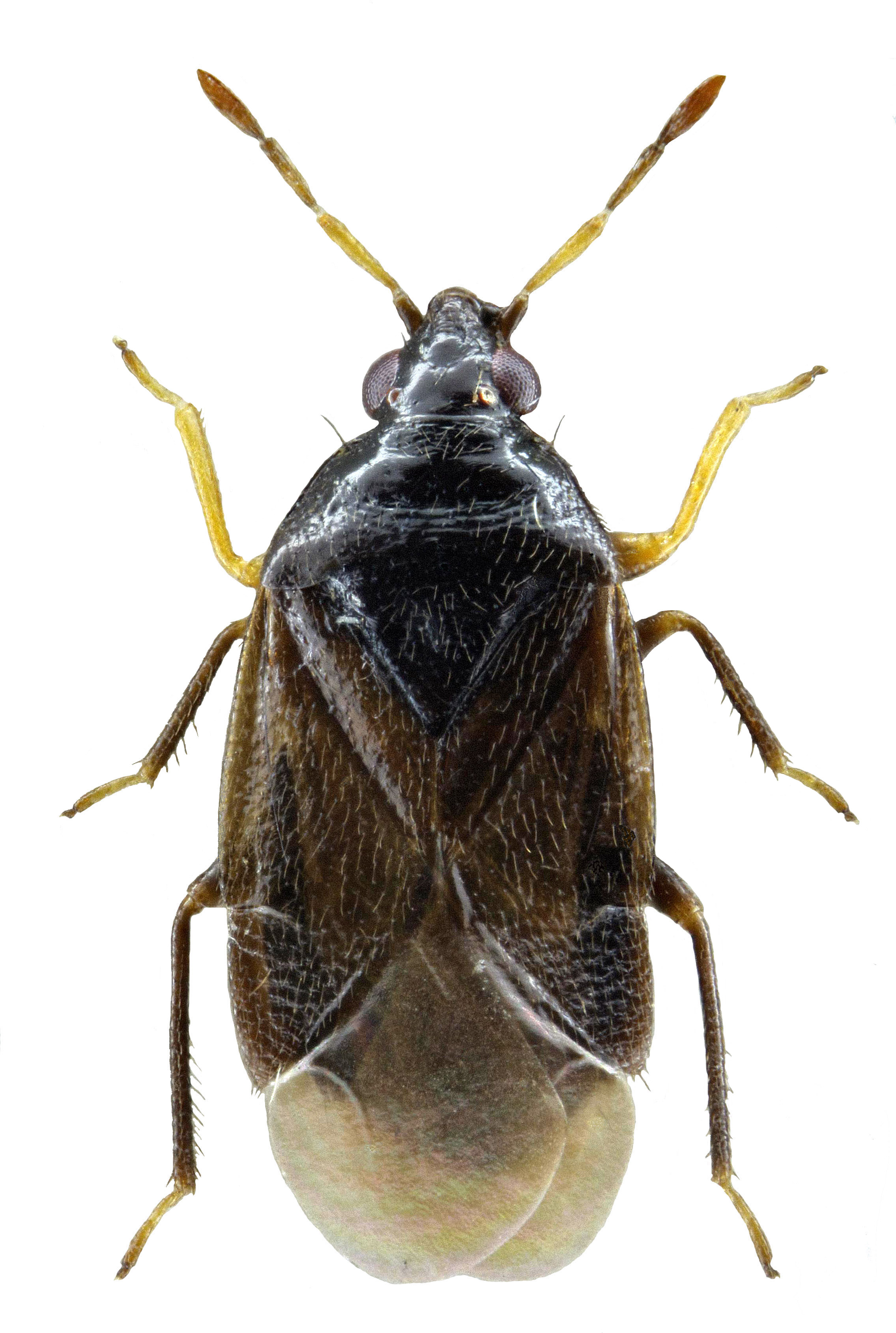
- Specimen in Zoologische Staatssammlung München

Scientific classification
- Domain: Eukaryota
- Kingdom: Animalia
- Phylum: Arthropoda
- Class: Insecta
- Order: Hemiptera
- Suborder: Heteroptera
- Family: Anthocoridae
- Genus: Orius
- Species: O. niger

Binomial name
- Orius niger (Wolff, 1811)

= Orius niger =

Species of true bug

Orius niger is a true bug. The species is found in the Palearctic from Europe east to Siberia and across Central Asia to China and India. It is widespread in Central Europe mostly in the south. In the Alps it is found up 1600 meters above sea level.

Orius niger lives in the herbaceous layer feeding on Boraginaceae, Ericaceae and Fabaceae, but also on stinging nettles Urtica and Artemisia.

The imago overwinters in loose ground litter, under bark scales or on stems or dried flowers. Most males die over the winter. The females lay their eggs in flowers of herbaceous plants. In favourable years there are two generations.

In laboratory conditions, the larval development of Orius niger takes 14 days at a temperature of 25 °C; females have a longevity of 60 days and can lay up to 150 eggs.
