= Cardiastethus elegans =

Scientific classification
- Domain: Eukaryota
- Kingdom: Animalia
- Phylum: Arthropoda
- Class: Insecta
- Order: Hemiptera
- Suborder: Heteroptera
- Family: Anthocoridae
- Genus: Cardiastethus
- Species: C. elegans

Binomial name
- Cardiastethus elegans Uhler, 1894

Synonyms
- Anthocoris elegans

Species of true bug

Cardiastethus elegans is a species of bugs in the family Anthocoridae. It has a Neotropical distribution.
