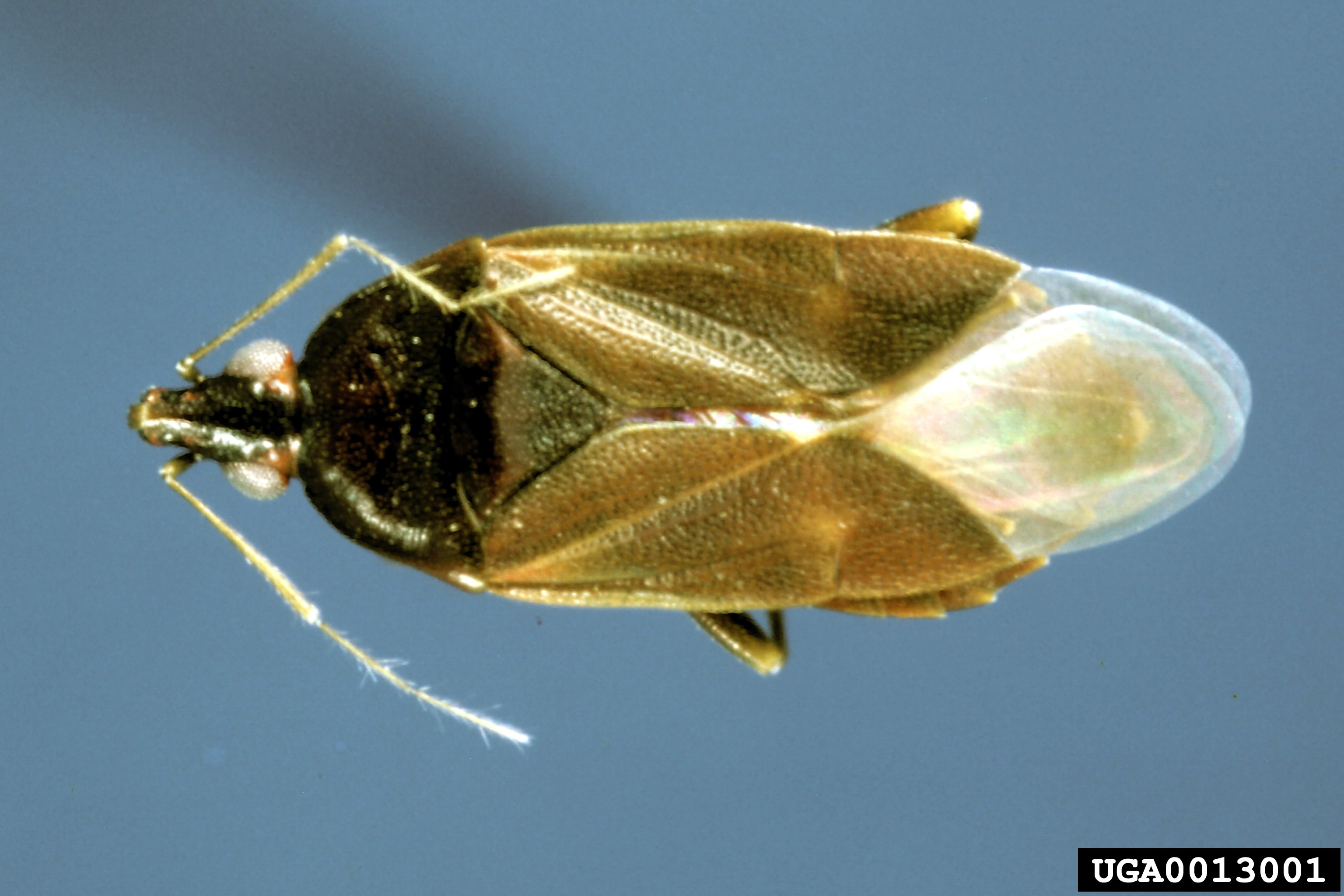

Scientific classification
- Kingdom: Animalia
- Phylum: Arthropoda
- Class: Insecta
- Order: Hemiptera
- Suborder: Heteroptera
- Family: Anthocoridae
- Genus: Scoloposcelis
- Species: S. flavicornis

Binomial name
- Scoloposcelis flavicornis Reuter, 1871

= Scoloposcelis flavicornis =

Species of true bug

Scoloposcelis flavicornis is a species of bugs in the family Anthocoridae. It is found in Central America and North America.
