= Tetraphleps pilosipes =

Scientific classification
- Domain: Eukaryota
- Kingdom: Animalia
- Phylum: Arthropoda
- Class: Insecta
- Order: Hemiptera
- Suborder: Heteroptera
- Family: Anthocoridae
- Genus: Tetraphleps
- Species: T. pilosipes

Binomial name
- Tetraphleps pilosipes Kelton & Anderson, 1962

Species of true bug

Tetraphleps pilosipes is a species of minute pirate bug in the family Anthocoridae. It is found in North America.
