= Melanocoris nigricornis =

Scientific classification
- Kingdom: Animalia
- Phylum: Arthropoda
- Clade: Pancrustacea
- Class: Insecta
- Order: Hemiptera
- Suborder: Heteroptera
- Family: Anthocoridae
- Genus: Melanocoris
- Species: M. nigricornis

Binomial name
- Melanocoris nigricornis Van Duzee, 1921

Species of true bug

Melanocoris nigricornis is a species of minute pirate bug in the family Anthocoridae. It is found in North America.
