= Cardiastethus borealis =

Scientific classification
- Domain: Eukaryota
- Kingdom: Animalia
- Phylum: Arthropoda
- Class: Insecta
- Order: Hemiptera
- Suborder: Heteroptera
- Family: Anthocoridae
- Genus: Cardiastethus
- Species: C. borealis

Binomial name
- Cardiastethus borealis Kelton, 1977

Species of true bug

Cardiastethus borealis is a species of minute pirate bug in the family Anthocoridae. It is mostly found in North America.
