= Elatophilus inimicus =

Scientific classification
- Domain: Eukaryota
- Kingdom: Animalia
- Phylum: Arthropoda
- Class: Insecta
- Order: Hemiptera
- Suborder: Heteroptera
- Family: Anthocoridae
- Genus: Elatophilus
- Species: E. inimicus

Binomial name
- Elatophilus inimicus (Drake & Harris, 1926)

Species of true bug

Elatophilus inimicus is a species of minute pirate bug in the family Anthocoridae. It is found in North America.
