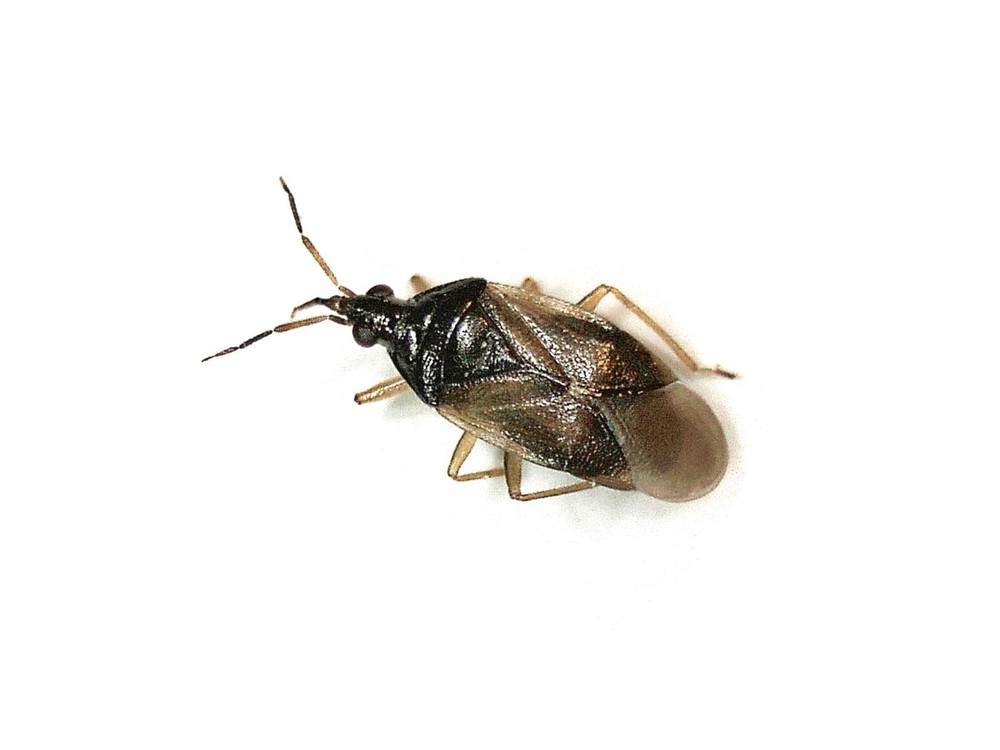
- Orius majusculus Lentse Waard, the Netherlands

Scientific classification
- Kingdom: Animalia
- Phylum: Arthropoda
- Clade: Pancrustacea
- Class: Insecta
- Order: Hemiptera
- Suborder: Heteroptera
- Family: Anthocoridae
- Genus: Orius
- Species: O. majusculus

Binomial name
- Orius majusculus (Reuter 1879)

= Orius majusculus =

Species of true bug

Orius majusculus is a Palearctic species of true bug. It is predatory.
