= Tetraphleps latipennis =

Scientific classification
- Kingdom: Animalia
- Phylum: Arthropoda
- Clade: Pancrustacea
- Class: Insecta
- Order: Hemiptera
- Suborder: Heteroptera
- Family: Anthocoridae
- Genus: Tetraphleps
- Species: T. latipennis

Binomial name
- Tetraphleps latipennis Van Duzee, 1921

Species of true bug

Tetraphleps latipennis is a species of minute pirate bug in the family Anthocoridae. It is found in North America.
