= Xylocoris flavipes =

Scientific classification
- Kingdom: Animalia
- Phylum: Arthropoda
- Class: Insecta
- Order: Hemiptera
- Suborder: Heteroptera
- Family: Anthocoridae
- Genus: Xylocoris
- Species: X. flavipes

Binomial name
- Xylocoris flavipes (Reuter, 1875)

Species of true bug

Xylocoris flavipes, the warehouse pirate bug, is a species of bugs in the family Anthocoridae. It is found in Africa, Australia, Europe and Northern Asia (excluding China), North America, South America, and Southern Asia.
