= Calliodis temnostethoides =

Scientific classification
- Domain: Eukaryota
- Kingdom: Animalia
- Phylum: Arthropoda
- Class: Insecta
- Order: Hemiptera
- Suborder: Heteroptera
- Family: Anthocoridae
- Genus: Calliodis
- Species: C. temnostethoides

Binomial name
- Calliodis temnostethoides (Reuter, 1884)

Species of true bug

Calliodis temnostethoides is a species of bugs in the family Anthocoridae. It is found in North America. Adults are often found near clusters of dead leaves, as the species is saproxylic, living in dead wood.
