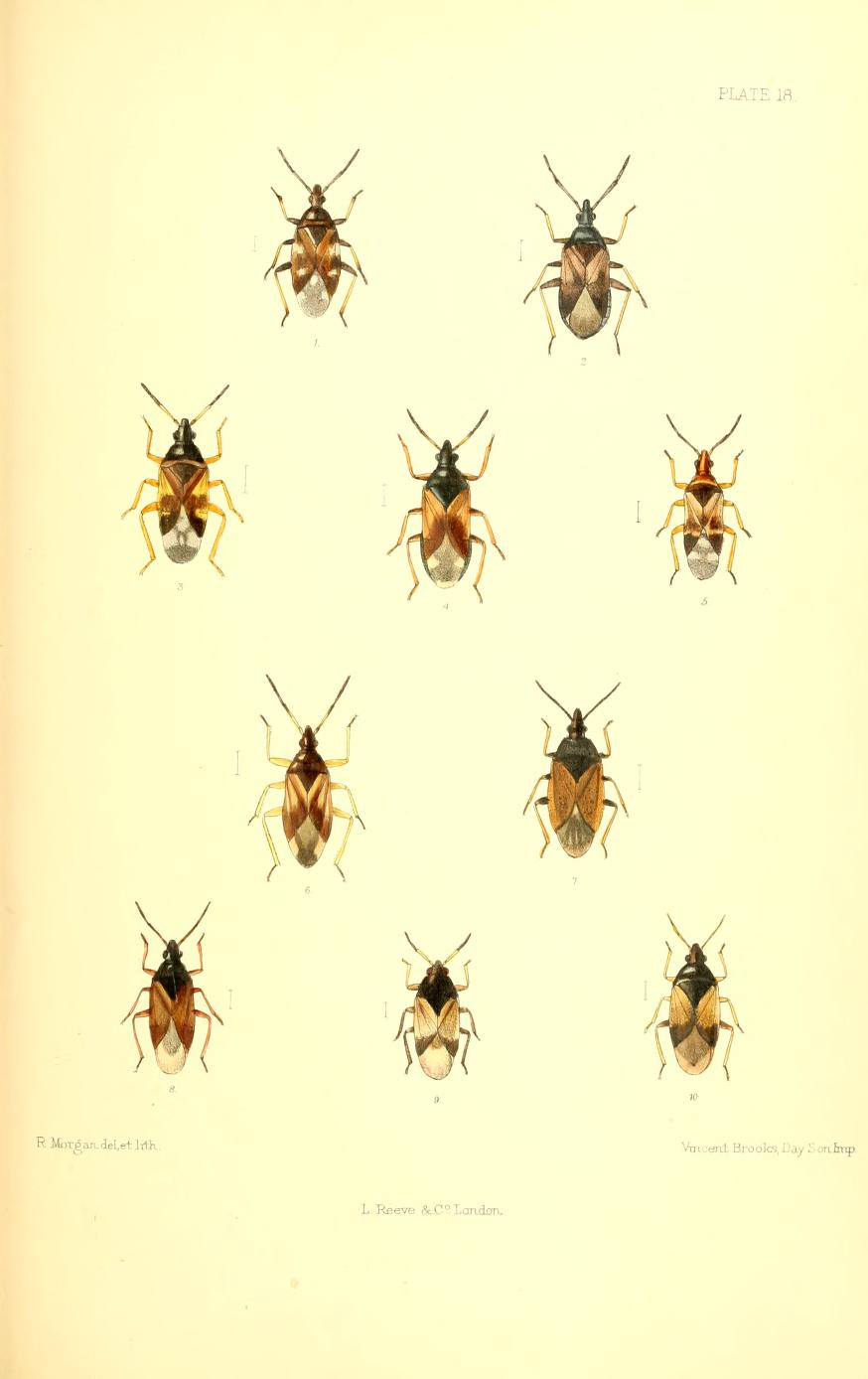
- Acompocoris alpinus depicted in Edward Saunders Hemiptera Heteroptera of the British Islands (figure 8)

Scientific classification
- Domain: Eukaryota
- Kingdom: Animalia
- Phylum: Arthropoda
- Class: Insecta
- Order: Hemiptera
- Suborder: Heteroptera
- Family: Anthocoridae
- Genus: Acompocoris
- Species: A. alpinus

Binomial name
- Acompocoris alpinus (Reuter, 1875)

= Acompocoris alpinus =

Species of true bug

Acompocoris alpinus is a true bug in the family Anthocoridae. The species is found in Europe. It occurs on conifers, where it is a predator of aphids. In France at an altitude of 1,200 – 2,000 m. A. alpinus Reuter, is found on Abies and Picea
