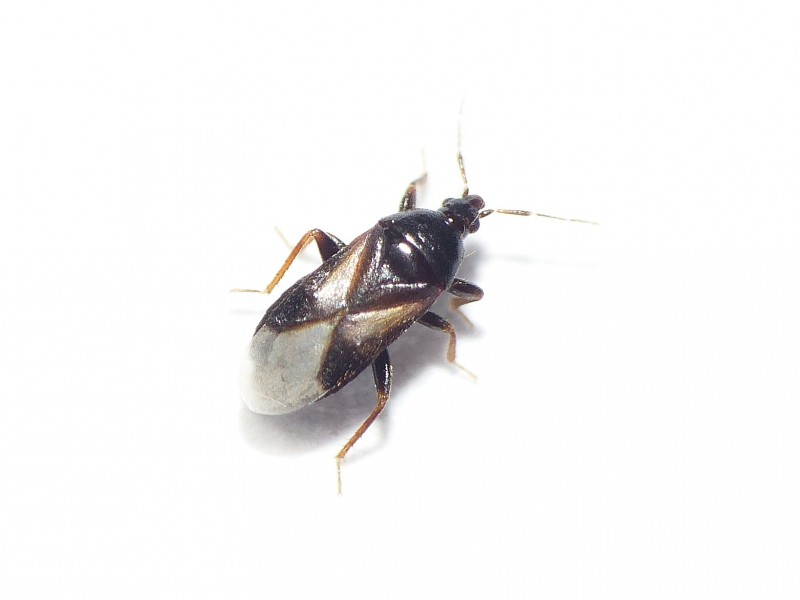

Scientific classification
- Kingdom: Animalia
- Phylum: Arthropoda
- Class: Insecta
- Order: Hemiptera
- Suborder: Heteroptera
- Family: Anthocoridae
- Genus: Xylocoris
- Species: X. cursitans

Binomial name
- Xylocoris cursitans (Fallén, 1807)

Synonyms
- Xylocoris rufipennis Dufour, 1831

= Xylocoris cursitans =

Species of true bug

Xylocoris cursitans is a species of bugs in the family Anthocoridae. It is found in Europe and Northern Asia (excluding China) and North America.
