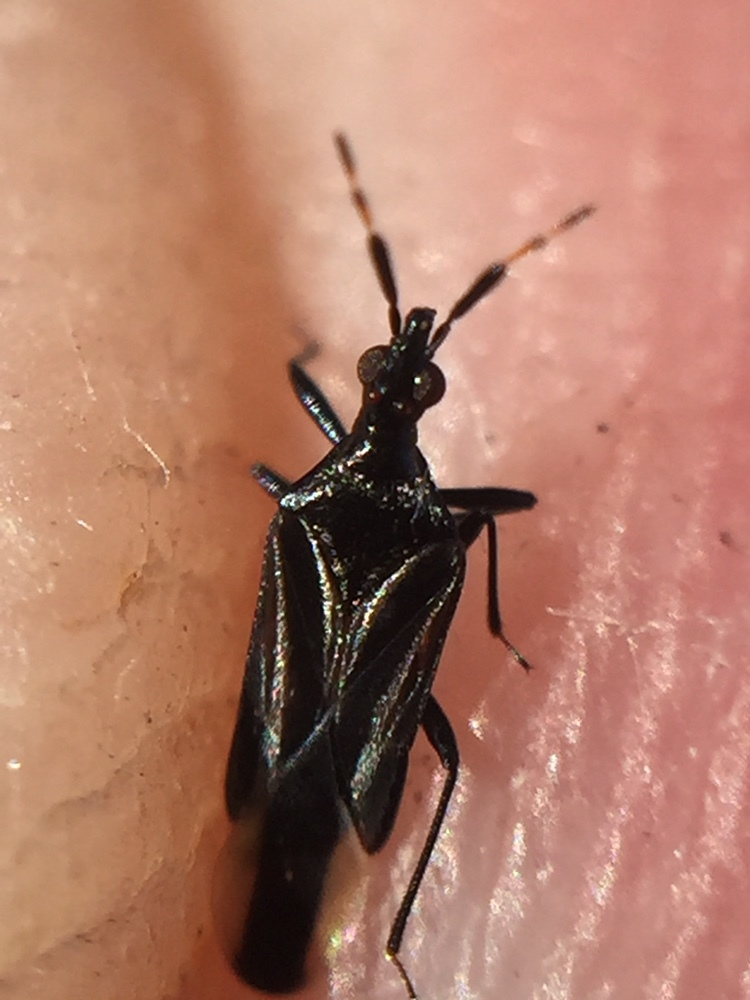
- Macrotrachelia nigronitens, New Zealand

Scientific classification
- Domain: Eukaryota
- Kingdom: Animalia
- Phylum: Arthropoda
- Class: Insecta
- Order: Hemiptera
- Suborder: Heteroptera
- Family: Anthocoridae
- Tribe: Anthocorini
- Genus: Macrotrachelia; Reuter, 1871

= Macrotrachelia =

Genus of insects

Macrotrachelia is a genus of minute pirate bugs in the family Anthocoridae. There are about six described species in Macrotrachelia.

Macrotrachelia species are native to Central and South America. The species Macrotrachelia nigronitens is also adventive to New Zealand and North America.

== Species ==
These six species belong to the genus Macrotrachelia:

- Macrotrachelia albovittata Champion, 1900
- Macrotrachelia elongata Champion, 1900
- Macrotrachelia nigronitens (Stål, 1860)
- Macrotrachelia nitida Champion, 1900
- Macrotrachelia opacipennis Champion, 1900
- Macrotrachelia thripiformis Champion, 1901
