= Xylocoris hirtus =

Scientific classification
- Kingdom: Animalia
- Phylum: Arthropoda
- Class: Insecta
- Order: Hemiptera
- Suborder: Heteroptera
- Family: Anthocoridae
- Genus: Xylocoris
- Species: X. hirtus

Binomial name
- Xylocoris hirtus Kelton, 1976

Species of true bug

Xylocoris hirtus is a species of bugs in the family Anthocoridae. It is found in North America.
