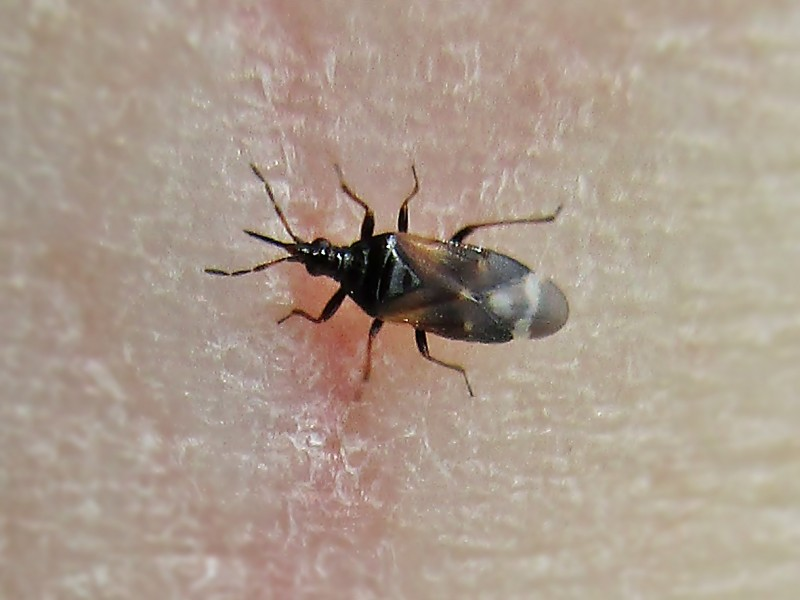
- Anthocoris confusus

Scientific classification
- Domain: Eukaryota
- Kingdom: Animalia
- Phylum: Arthropoda
- Class: Insecta
- Order: Hemiptera
- Suborder: Heteroptera
- Family: Anthocoridae
- Subfamily: Anthocorinae
- Tribe: Anthocorini; Fieber, 1837

= Anthocorini =

Tribe of true bugs

Anthocorini is a tribe of minute pirate bugs in the family Anthocoridae. There are more than 30 described species in Anthocorini.

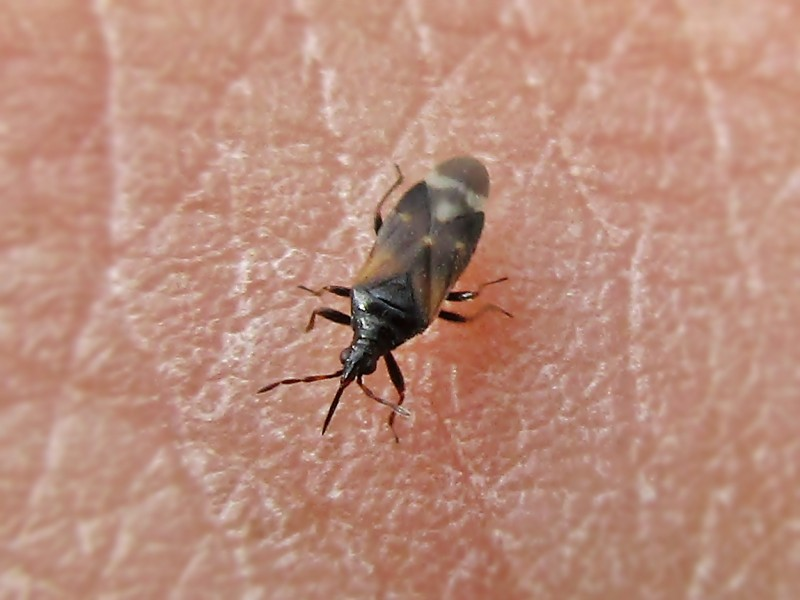
Anthocoris confusus

== Genera ==
BioLib includes the following in tribe Anthocorini:

1. Acompocoris Reuter, 1875^{i c g b}
2. Anthocoris Fallen, 1814^{i c g b}
3. Coccivora McAtee & Malloch, 1925^{i c g b}
4. Dufouriellus Kirkaldy, 1906
5. Elatophilus Reuter, 1884^{i c g b}
6. Galchana Distant, 1910
7. Macrotrachelia Reuter, 1871
8. Melanocoris Champion, 1900^{i c g b}
9. Temnostethus Fieber, 1860^{i c g b}
10. Tetraphleps Fieber, 1860^{i c g b}
11. †Xyloesteles Popov & Herczek, 2011

Data sources: i = ITIS, c = Catalogue of Life, g = GBIF, b = Bugguide.net
