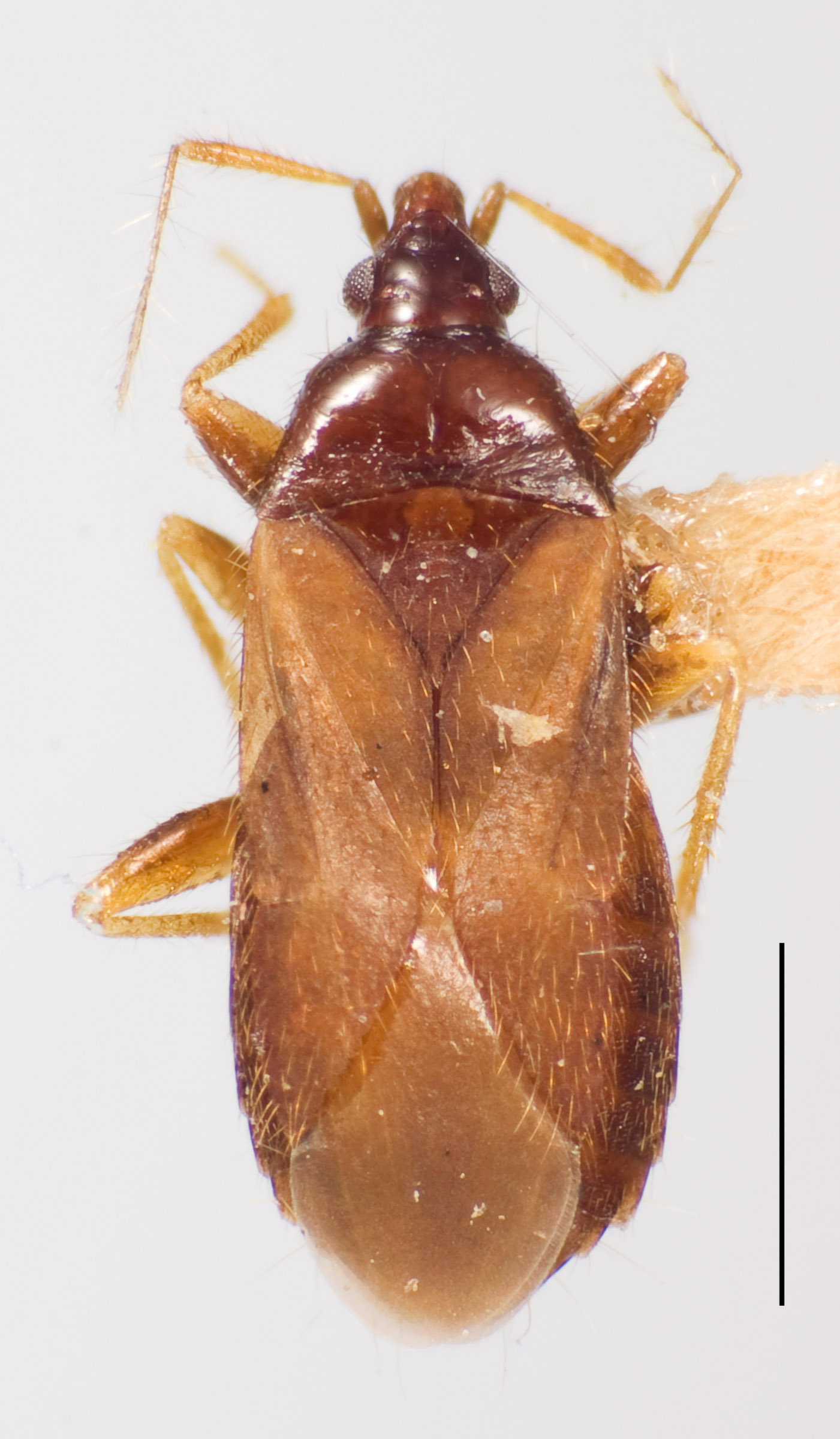

Scientific classification
- Domain: Eukaryota
- Kingdom: Animalia
- Phylum: Arthropoda
- Class: Insecta
- Order: Hemiptera
- Suborder: Heteroptera
- Family: Anthocoridae
- Genus: Lasiochilus
- Species: L. fusculus

Binomial name
- Lasiochilus fusculus (Reuter, 1871)

= Lasiochilus fusculus =

Species of true bug

Lasiochilus fusculus is a species of true bug in the family Lasiochilidae. It is found in the Caribbean Sea and North America.
