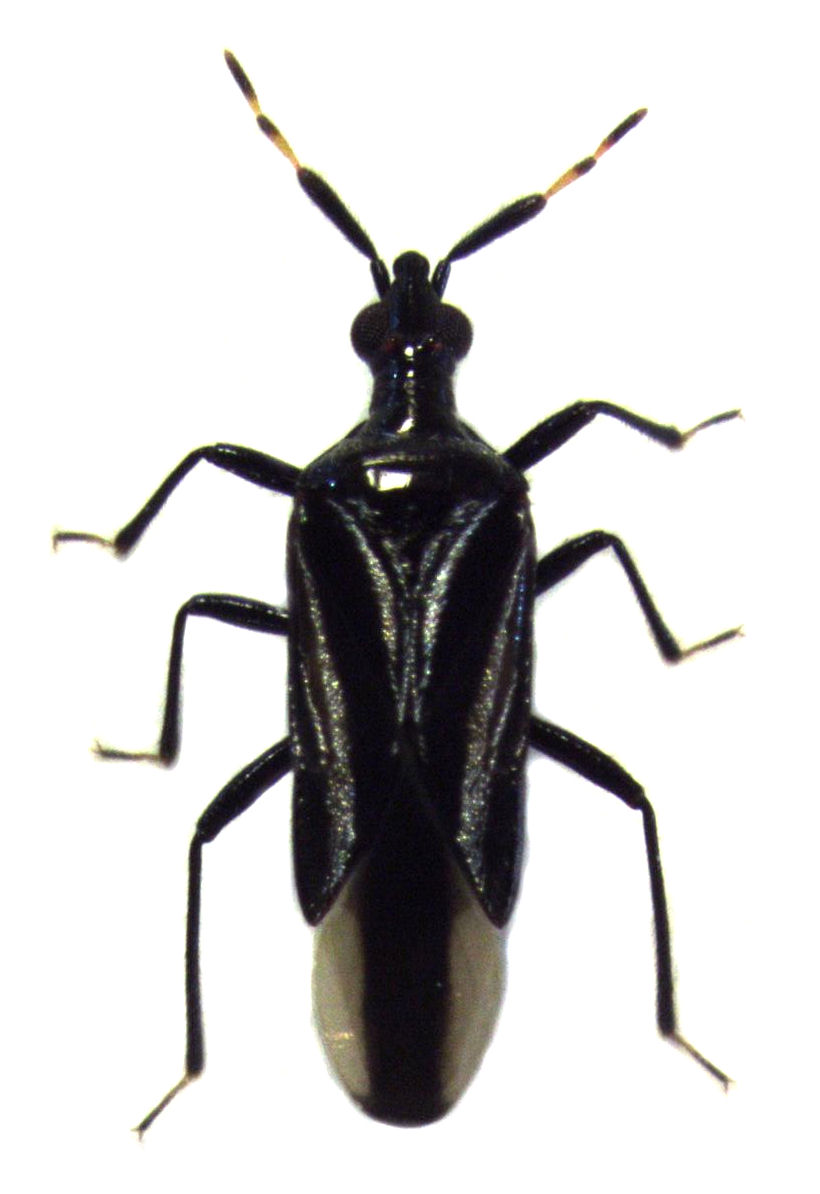
- Macrotrachelia nigronitens♂ (length about 3mm)

Scientific classification
- Kingdom: Animalia
- Phylum: Arthropoda
- Clade: Pancrustacea
- Class: Insecta
- Order: Hemiptera
- Suborder: Heteroptera
- Family: Anthocoridae
- Genus: Macrotrachelia
- Species: M. nigronitens

Binomial name
- Macrotrachelia nigronitens (Stål, 1860)

= Macrotrachelia nigronitens =

Species of insect

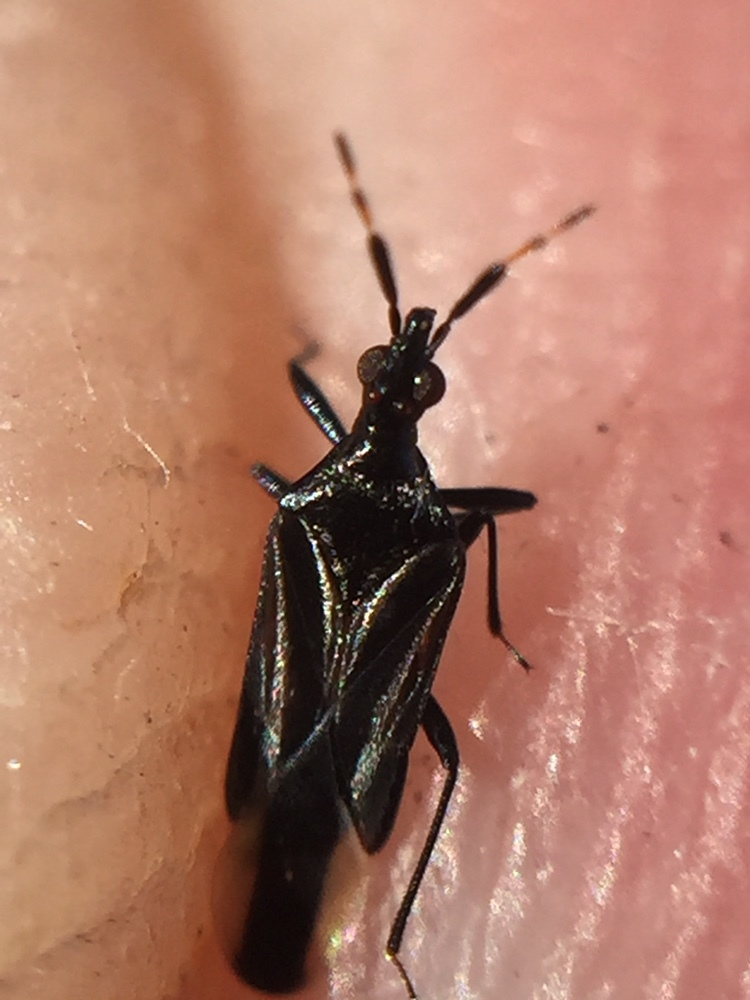
Macrotrachelia nigronitens, New Zealand

Macrotrachelia nigronitens is a species of minute pirate bug or flower bug in the family Anthocoridae. It is native to Central and South America, and adventive to New Zealand and North America.
