= Acompocoris lepidus =

Scientific classification
- Domain: Eukaryota
- Kingdom: Animalia
- Phylum: Arthropoda
- Class: Insecta
- Order: Hemiptera
- Suborder: Heteroptera
- Family: Anthocoridae
- Genus: Acompocoris
- Species: A. lepidus

Binomial name
- Acompocoris lepidus (Van Duzee, 1921)

Species of true bug

Acompocoris lepidus is a species of minute pirate bug in the family Anthocoridae. It is found in North America.
