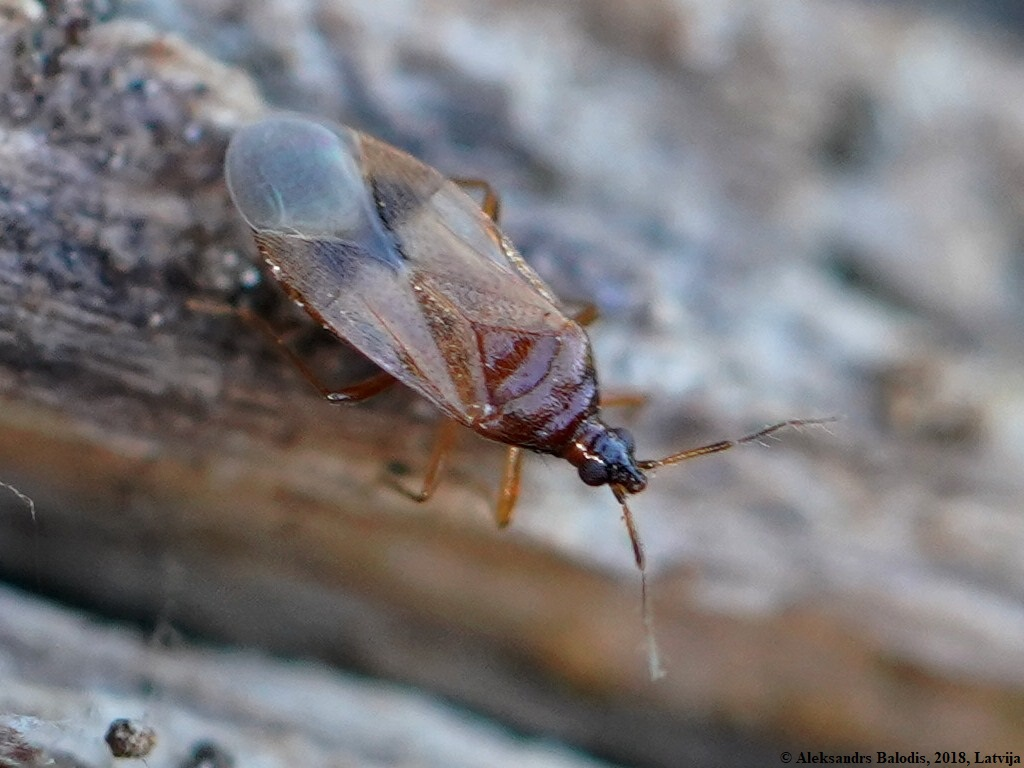
- Amphiareus obscuriceps

Scientific classification
- Kingdom: Animalia
- Phylum: Arthropoda
- Clade: Pancrustacea
- Class: Insecta
- Order: Hemiptera
- Suborder: Heteroptera
- Family: Anthocoridae
- Tribe: Dufouriellini
- Genus: Amphiareus; Distant, 1904

= Amphiareus =

Genus of true bugs

Amphiareus is a genus of minute pirate bugs belonging to the family Anthocoridae.

The genus was first described by Distant in 1904.

The species of this genus are found in Eurasia and North America.

Species:

- Amphiareus constrictus (Stål, 1860)
- Amphiareus edentulus Yamada 2008
- Amphiareus obscuriceps (Poppius, 1909)
- Amphiareus rompinus Yamada 2008
