= Elatophilus =

Scientific classification
- Kingdom: Animalia
- Phylum: Arthropoda
- Clade: Pancrustacea
- Class: Insecta
- Order: Hemiptera
- Suborder: Heteroptera
- Family: Anthocoridae
- Tribe: Anthocorini
- Genus: Elatophilus; Reuter, 1884

Subgenera
- Elatophilus (Elatophilus) Reuter, 1884; Elatophilus (Euhadrocerus) Reuter, 1884

Synonyms
- Xenotracheliella Drake and Harris, 1926

Genus of true bugs

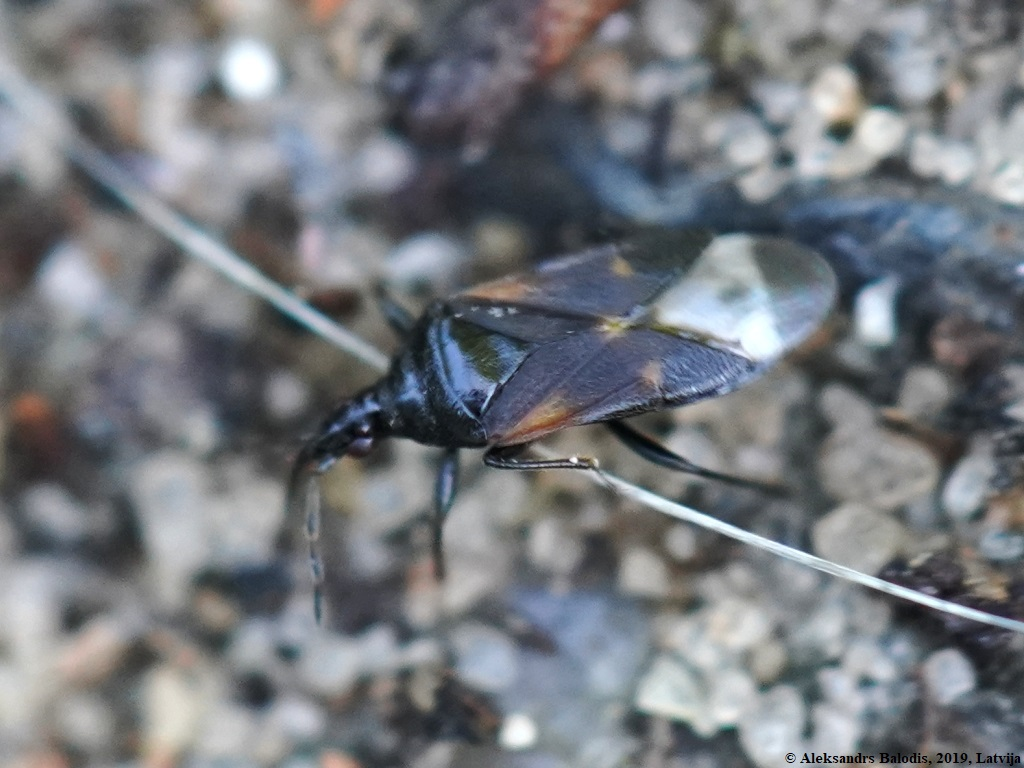

Elatophilus is a genus of minute pirate bugs in the family Anthocoridae. There are about 15 described species in Elatophilus.

== Species ==
These 15 species belong to the genus Elatophilus:

- Elatophilus antennatus Kelton, 1976
- Elatophilus brimleyi Kelton, 1977
- Elatophilus crassicornis (Reuter, 1875)
- Elatophilus dimidiatus (Van Duzee, 1921)
- Elatophilus hebraicus Pericart, 1967
- Elatophilus inimicus (Drake & Harris, 1926)
- Elatophilus minutus Kelton, 1976
- Elatophilus nigrellus (Zetterstedt, 1838)
- Elatophilus oculatus (Drake & Harris, 1926)
- Elatophilus pachycnemis Horvath, 1907
- Elatophilus pilosicornis Lindberg, 1953
- Elatophilus pinophilus Blatchley, 1928
- Elatophilus pullus Kelton & Anderson, 1962
- Elatophilus roubali Stys, 1959
- Xenotracheliella vicaria Drake & Harris, 1926
