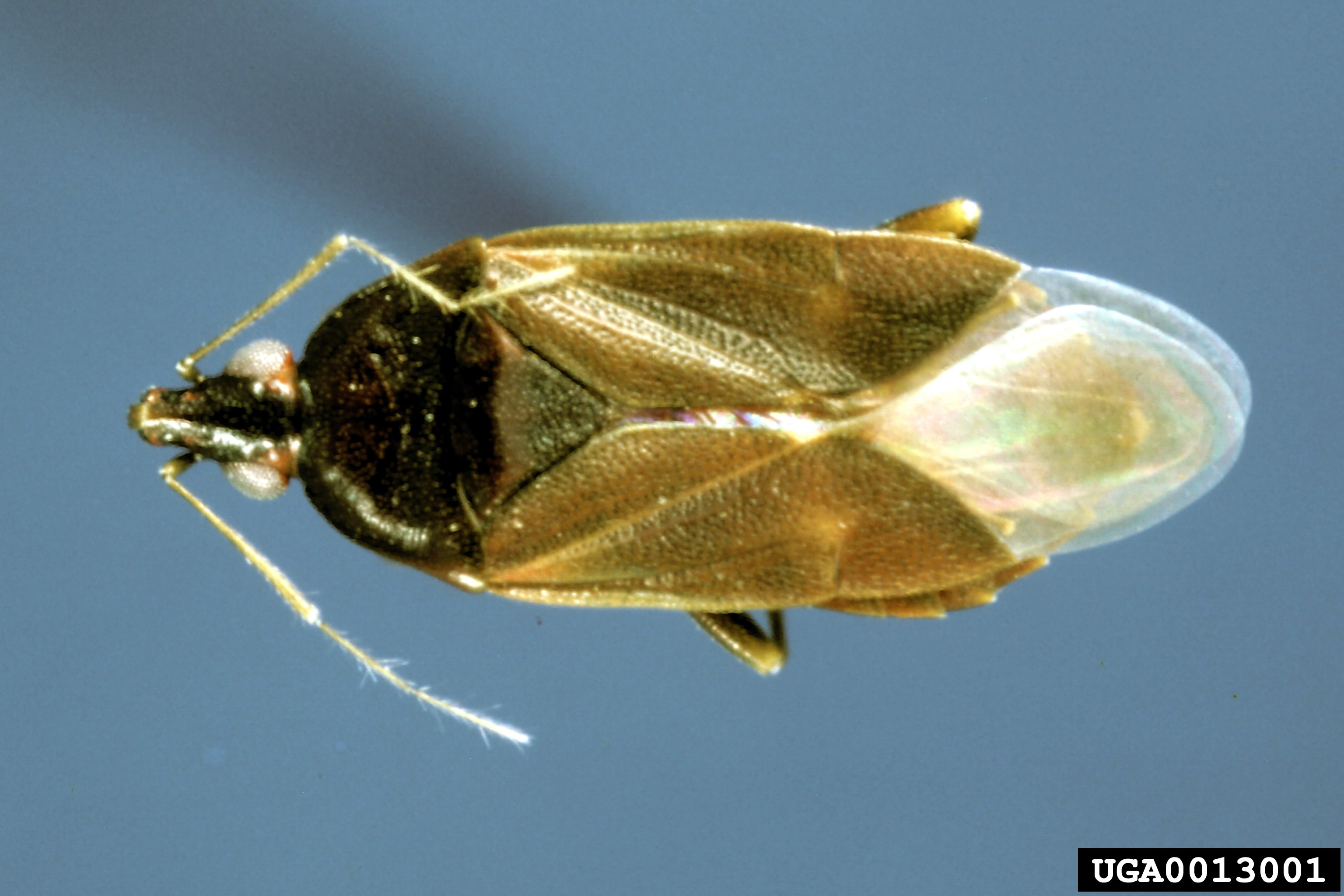
- Scoloposcelis

Scientific classification
- Kingdom: Animalia
- Phylum: Arthropoda
- Clade: Pancrustacea
- Class: Insecta
- Order: Hemiptera
- Suborder: Heteroptera
- Family: Anthocoridae
- Subfamily: Anthocorinae
- Tribe: Scolopini; Carayon, 1954

= Scolopini =

Tribe of true bugs

Scolopini is a tribe of bugs in the family Anthocoridae. There are at least 4 genera and about 10 described species in Scolopini.

== Genera ==
Two subtribes belong to the tribe Scolopini:

subtribe Calliodina Carayon

1. Calliodis Reuter, 1871^{i c g b}
2. Eulasiocolpus Champion, 1900
3. Lasiocolpoides Champion, 1900
4. Lepidonannella Poppius, 1913
5. Zopherocoris Reuter, 1871

subtribe Scolopina Carayon, 1954

1. Lasiochiloides Champion, 1900
2. Scolopa Carayon, 1954
3. Scolopella Carayon, 1954
4. Scolopocoris Carayon, 1972
5. Scoloposcelis Fieber, 1864

unplaced genera

1. Maoricoris China, 1933
2. Nidicola Harris and Drake, 1941^{i c g}
3. Solenonotus Reuter, 1871^{i c g}

Data sources: i = ITIS, c = Catalogue of Life, g = GBIF, b = Bugguide.net
