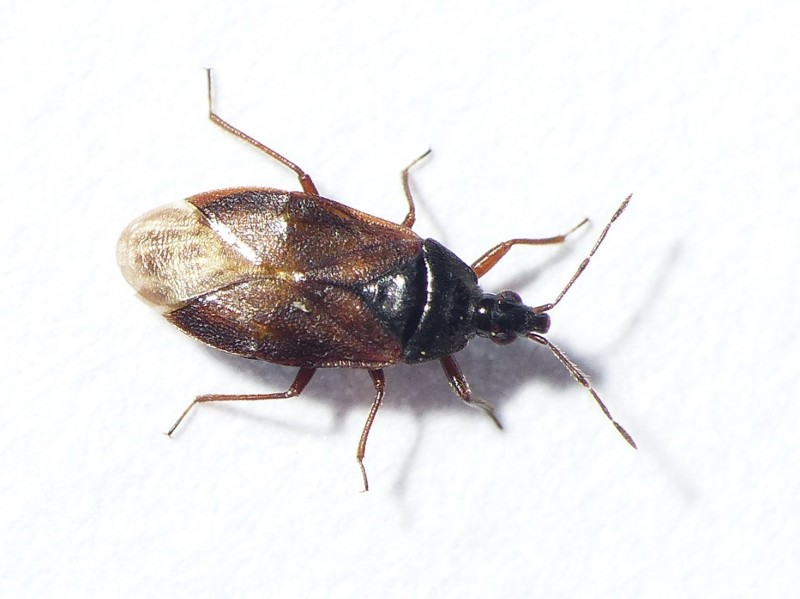
- Acompocoris alpinus

Scientific classification
- Kingdom: Animalia
- Phylum: Arthropoda
- Clade: Pancrustacea
- Class: Insecta
- Order: Hemiptera
- Suborder: Heteroptera
- Family: Anthocoridae
- Tribe: Anthocorini
- Genus: Acompocoris; Reuter, 1875

= Acompocoris =

Genus of true bugs

Acompocoris is a genus of minute pirate bugs in the family Anthocoridae. There are at least four described species in Acompocoris.

== Species ==
These four species belong to the genus Acompocoris:

- Acompocoris alpinus (Reuter, 1875)
- Acompocoris lepidus (Van Duzee, 1921)
- Acompocoris montanus Wagner, 1955
- Acompocoris pygmaeus (Fallén, 1807)
