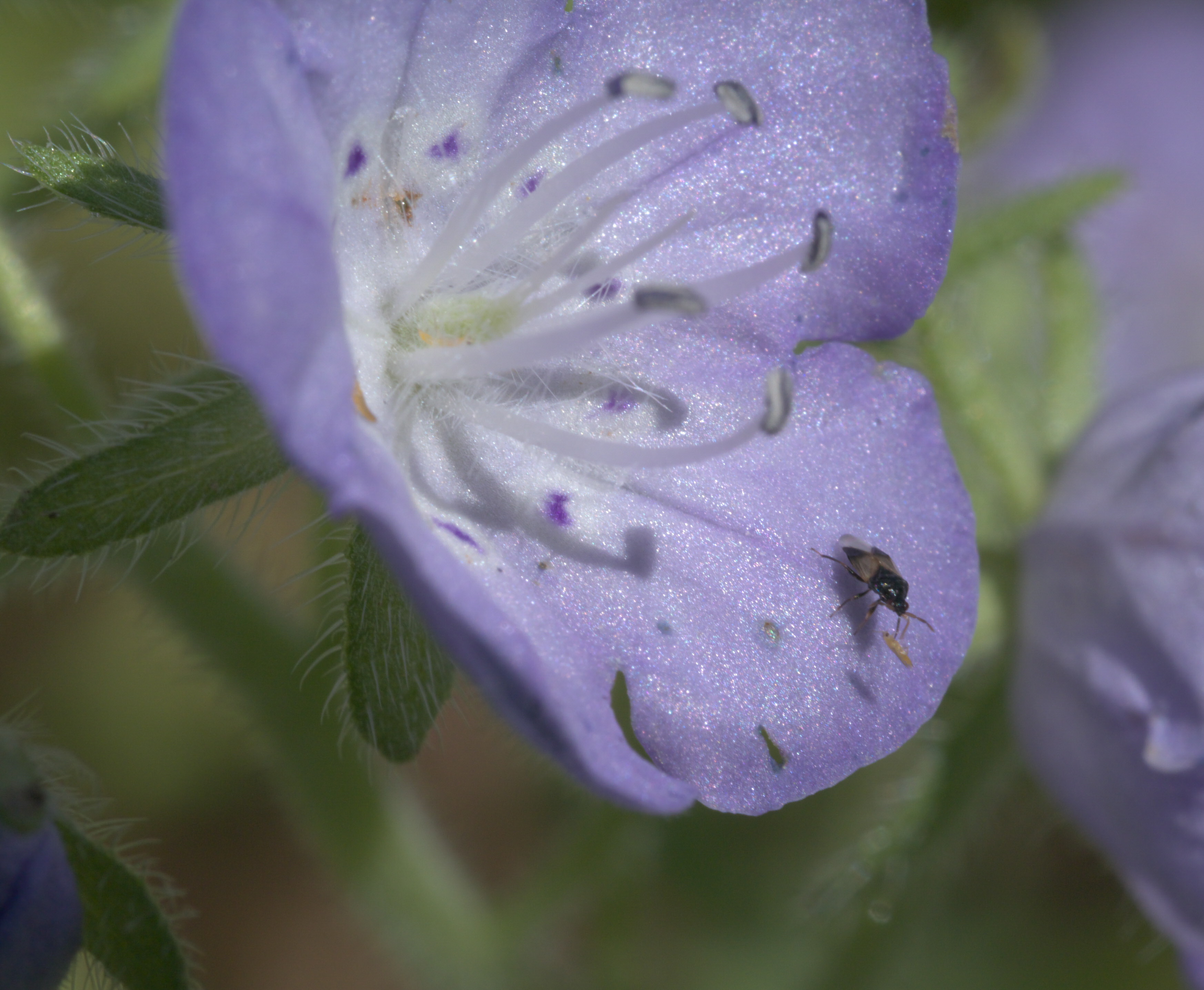
- Orius

Scientific classification
- Kingdom: Animalia
- Phylum: Arthropoda
- Clade: Pancrustacea
- Class: Insecta
- Order: Hemiptera
- Suborder: Heteroptera
- Family: Anthocoridae
- Subfamily: Anthocorinae
- Tribe: Oriini; Carayon, 1955

= Oriini =

Tribe of true bugs

Oriini is a tribe of minute pirate bugs in the family Anthocoridae. There are about 6 genera and more than 60 described species in Oriini.

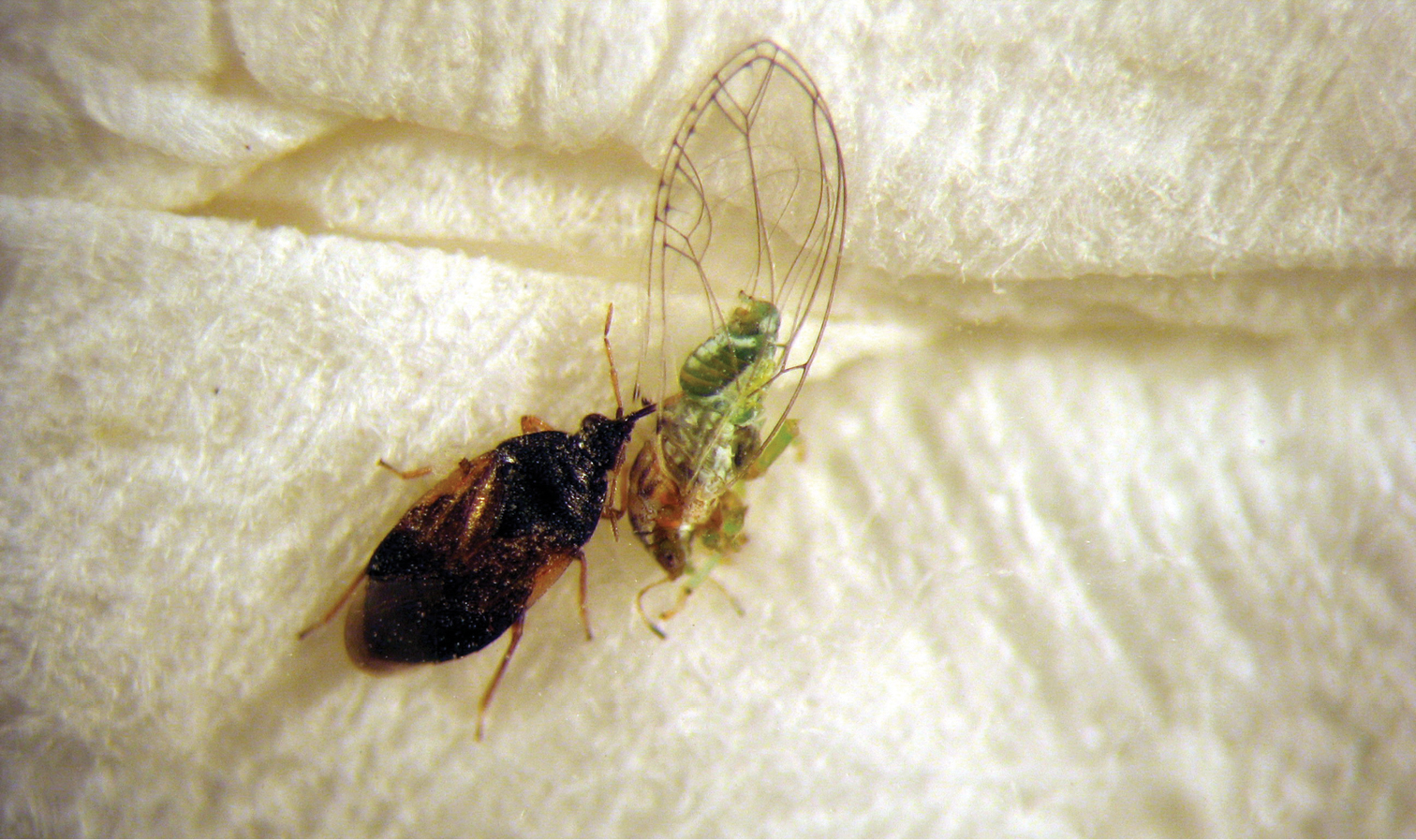
Orius minutus

== Genera ==
These six genera belong to the tribe Oriini:

- Macrothacheliella Champion, 1900
- Macrotracheliella Champion, 1900
- Montandionola Poppius, 1909
- Montandoniola Poppius, 1909
- Orius Wolff, 1811
- Paratriphleps Champion, 1900
