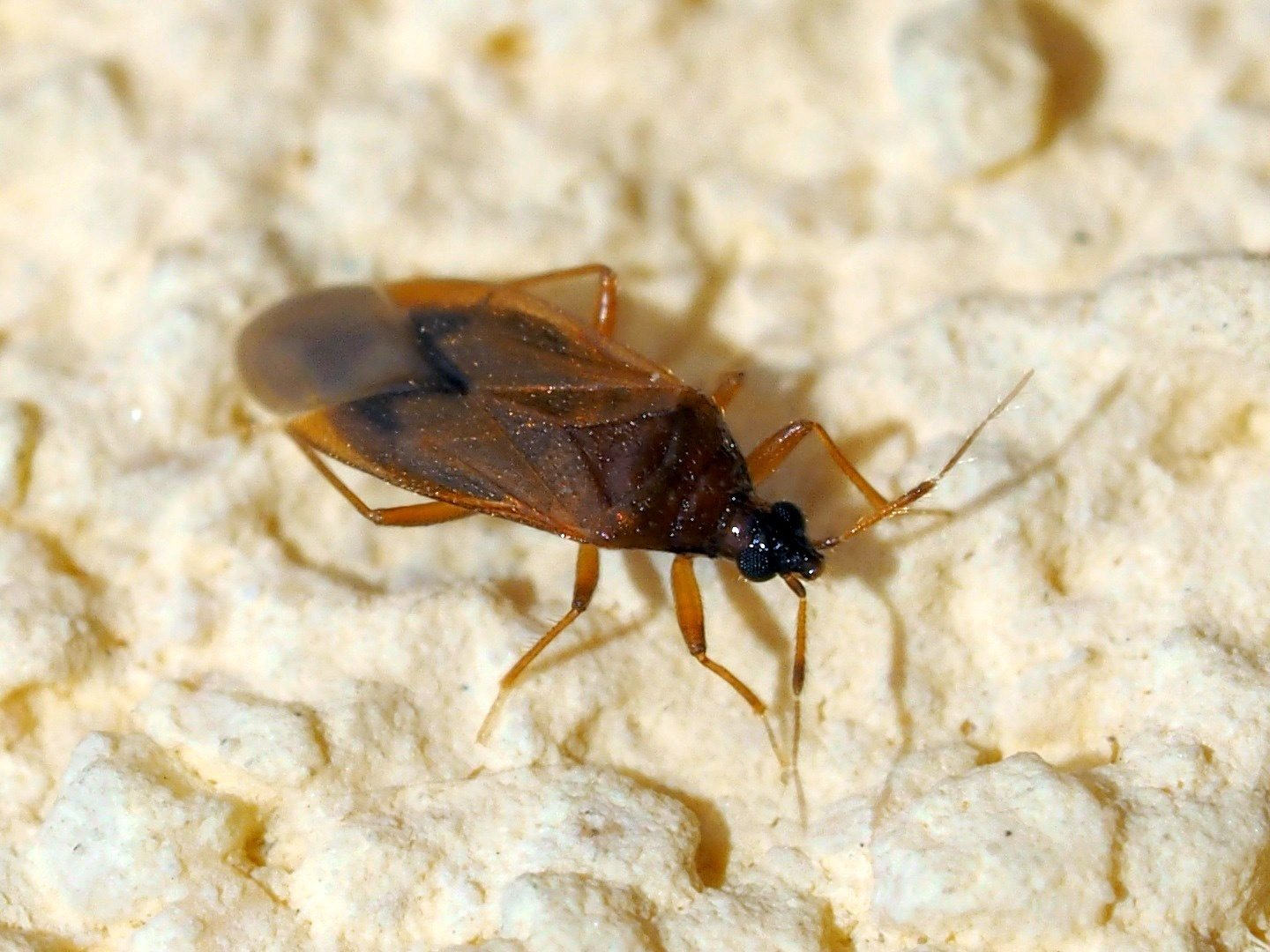

Scientific classification
- Kingdom: Animalia
- Phylum: Arthropoda
- Class: Insecta
- Order: Hemiptera
- Suborder: Heteroptera
- Family: Anthocoridae
- Genus: Amphiareus
- Species: A. obscuriceps

Binomial name
- Amphiareus obscuriceps (Poppius, 1909)

= Amphiareus obscuriceps =

Species of insect

Amphiareus obscuriceps is a species from the genus Amphiareus. The species was originally described by Bertil Poppius in 1909.
