= Tetraphleps =

Scientific classification
- Kingdom: Animalia
- Phylum: Arthropoda
- Class: Insecta
- Order: Hemiptera
- Suborder: Heteroptera
- Family: Anthocoridae
- Tribe: Anthocorini
- Genus: Tetraphleps; Fieber, 1860

Genus of true bugs

Tetraphleps is a genus of minute pirate bugs in the family Anthocoridae. There are about 10 described species in Tetraphleps.

== Species ==
These 10 species belong to the genus Tetraphleps:

- Tetraphleps aterrima (J.Sahlberg, 1878)^{g}
- Tetraphleps canadensis Provancher, 1886^{i c g}
- Tetraphleps edacis Drake & Harris^{g}
- Tetraphleps feratis (Drake and Harris, 1926)^{i c g}
- Tetraphleps latipennis Van Duzee, 1921^{i c g b}
- Tetraphleps novitus Drake & Harris^{g}
- Tetraphleps osborni Drake^{g}
- Tetraphleps pilosipes Kelton & Anderson, 1962^{i c g b}
- Tetraphleps profugus Drake & Harris^{g}
- Tetraphleps uniformis Parshley, 1920^{i c g b}

Data sources: i = ITIS, c = Catalogue of Life, g = GBIF, b = Bugguide.net
