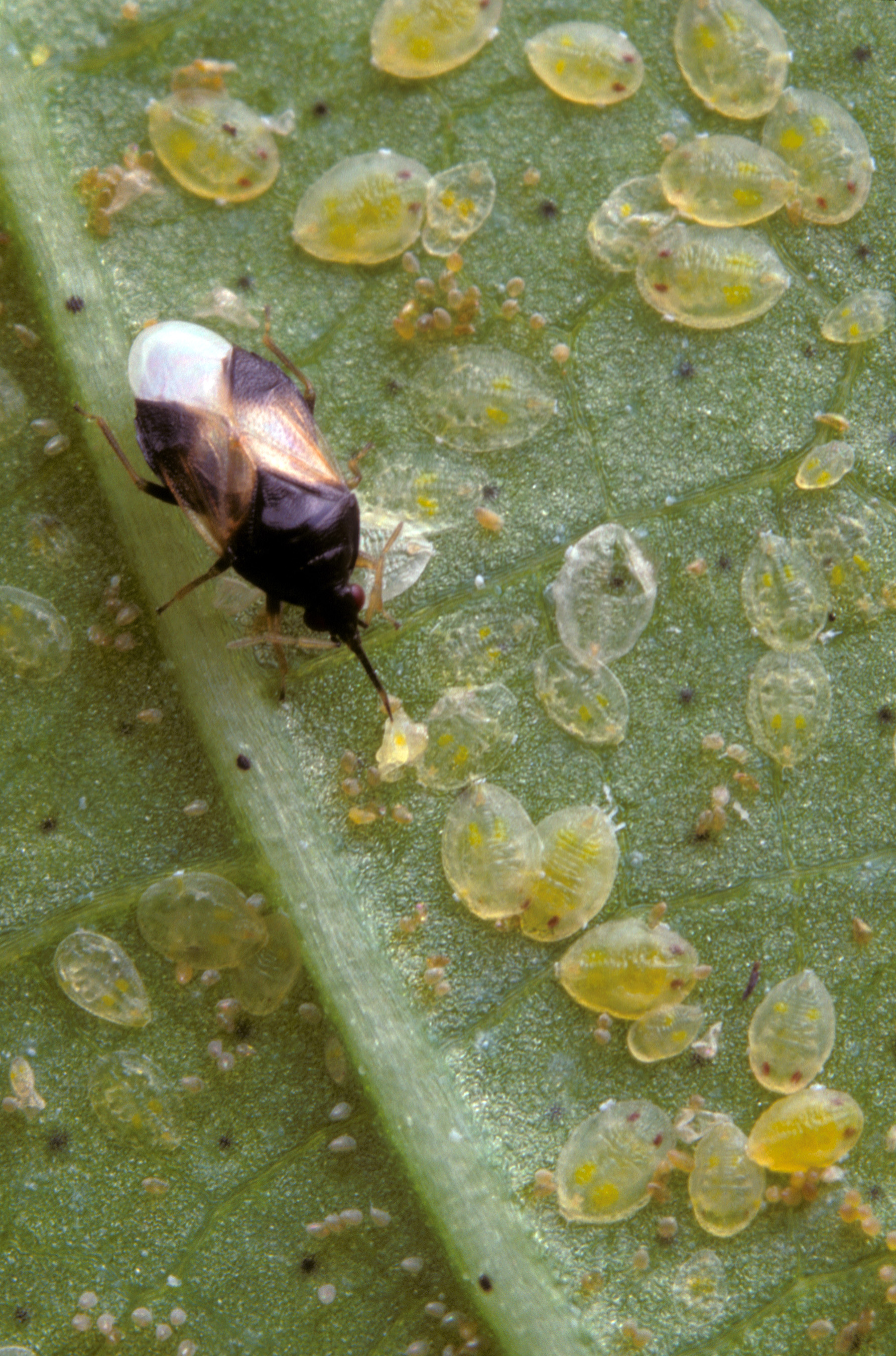
- Orius insidiosus

Scientific classification
- Kingdom: Animalia
- Phylum: Arthropoda
- Class: Insecta
- Order: Hemiptera
- Suborder: Heteroptera
- Family: Anthocoridae
- Tribe: Oriini
- Genus: Orius; Wolff, 1811

= Orius =

Genus of true bugs

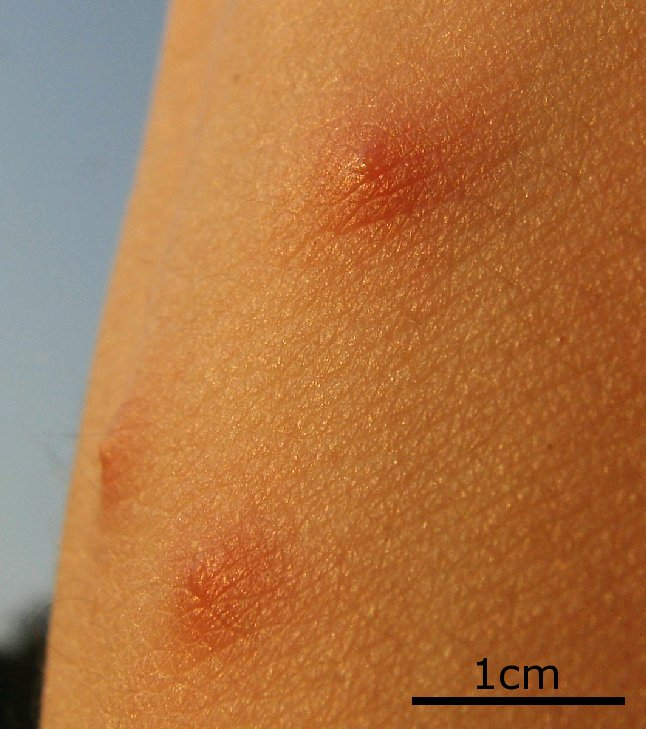
Bites of Orius sp. after one day

The genus Orius (commonly called minute pirate bug) consists of omnivorous bugs in the family Anthocoridae (pirate bugs). Adults are 2–5 mm long and feed mostly on smaller insects, larva and eggs, such as spider mites, thrips, jumping plant lice, and white fly, but will also feed on pollen and vascular sap.

These predators are common in gardens and landscapes. They have a fairly painful bite, but are not venomous.

Some species are raised commercially and sold to growers as a form of biological control.

In laboratory conditions, the larval development of Orius niger takes 14 days at a temperature of 25°; females have a longevity of 60 days and can lay up to 150 eggs.

== Species ==
- Orius candiope Herring, 1966
- Orius diespeter Herring, 1966
- Orius harpocrates Herring, 1966
- Orius insidiosus (Say, 1832) (insidious flower bug)
- Orius majusculus (Reuter, 1879)
- Orius minutus (Linnaeus, 1758)
- Orius niger (Wolff, 1811)
- Orius pumilio (Champion, 1900)
- Orius tantillus (Motschulsky)
- Orius thyestes Herring, 1966
- Orius tristicolor (White, 1879)
- Orius laevigatus (Fieber, 1860)
