= Calliodis =

Scientific classification
- Domain: Eukaryota
- Kingdom: Animalia
- Phylum: Arthropoda
- Class: Insecta
- Order: Hemiptera
- Suborder: Heteroptera
- Family: Anthocoridae
- Tribe: Scolopini
- Genus: Calliodis; Reuter, 1871

Species
- Calliodis maculipennis; Calliodis pallescens (Reuter, 1884); Calliodis picturata Reuter, 1871; Calliodis semipicta (Blatchley, 1926); Calliodis temnostethoides (Reuter, 1884)

Synonyms
- Asthenidea Reuter, 1884

Genus of true bugs

Calliodis is a genus of bugs in the family Anthocoridae.
