= Lippomanus =

Scientific classification
- Kingdom: Animalia
- Phylum: Arthropoda
- Clade: Pancrustacea
- Class: Insecta
- Order: Hemiptera
- Suborder: Heteroptera
- Superfamily: Cimicoidea
- Family: Anthocoridae
- Subfamily: Anthocorinae
- Genus: Lippomanus; Distant, 1904

Genus of insects

Lippomanus is a genus of seed bugs in the subfamily Anthocorinae (tribe Almeidini), erected by William Lucas Distant 1904.

== Species ==
BioLib lists:

1. Lippomanus brevicornis Yamada & Hirowatari, 2004
2. Lippomanus hirsutus Distant, 1904 = type species
