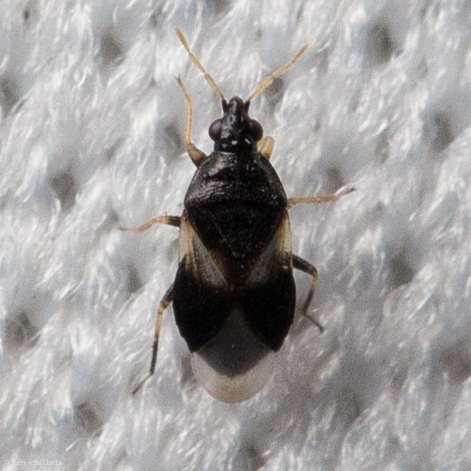

Scientific classification
- Domain: Eukaryota
- Kingdom: Animalia
- Phylum: Arthropoda
- Class: Insecta
- Order: Hemiptera
- Suborder: Heteroptera
- Family: Anthocoridae
- Genus: Orius
- Species: O. tristicolor

Binomial name
- Orius tristicolor (White, 1879)

= Orius tristicolor =

Species of true bug

Orius tristicolor, known generally as the minute flower bug or minute pirate bug, is a species of minute pirate bug in the family Anthocoridae. It is found in the Caribbean Sea, Central America, North America, Oceania, and South America.
