= Melanocoris =

Scientific classification
- Kingdom: Animalia
- Phylum: Arthropoda
- Clade: Pancrustacea
- Class: Insecta
- Order: Hemiptera
- Suborder: Heteroptera
- Family: Anthocoridae
- Tribe: Anthocorini
- Genus: Melanocoris; Champion, 1900

Genus of true bugs

Melanocoris is a genus of minute pirate bugs in the family Anthocoridae. There are at least four described species in Melanocoris.

== Species ==
These four species belong to the genus Melanocoris:

- Melanocoris longirostris Kelton, 1977
- Melanocoris nigricornis Van Duzee, 1921
- Melanocoris obovatus Champion, 1900
- Melanocoris pingreensis (Drake & Harris, 1926)
