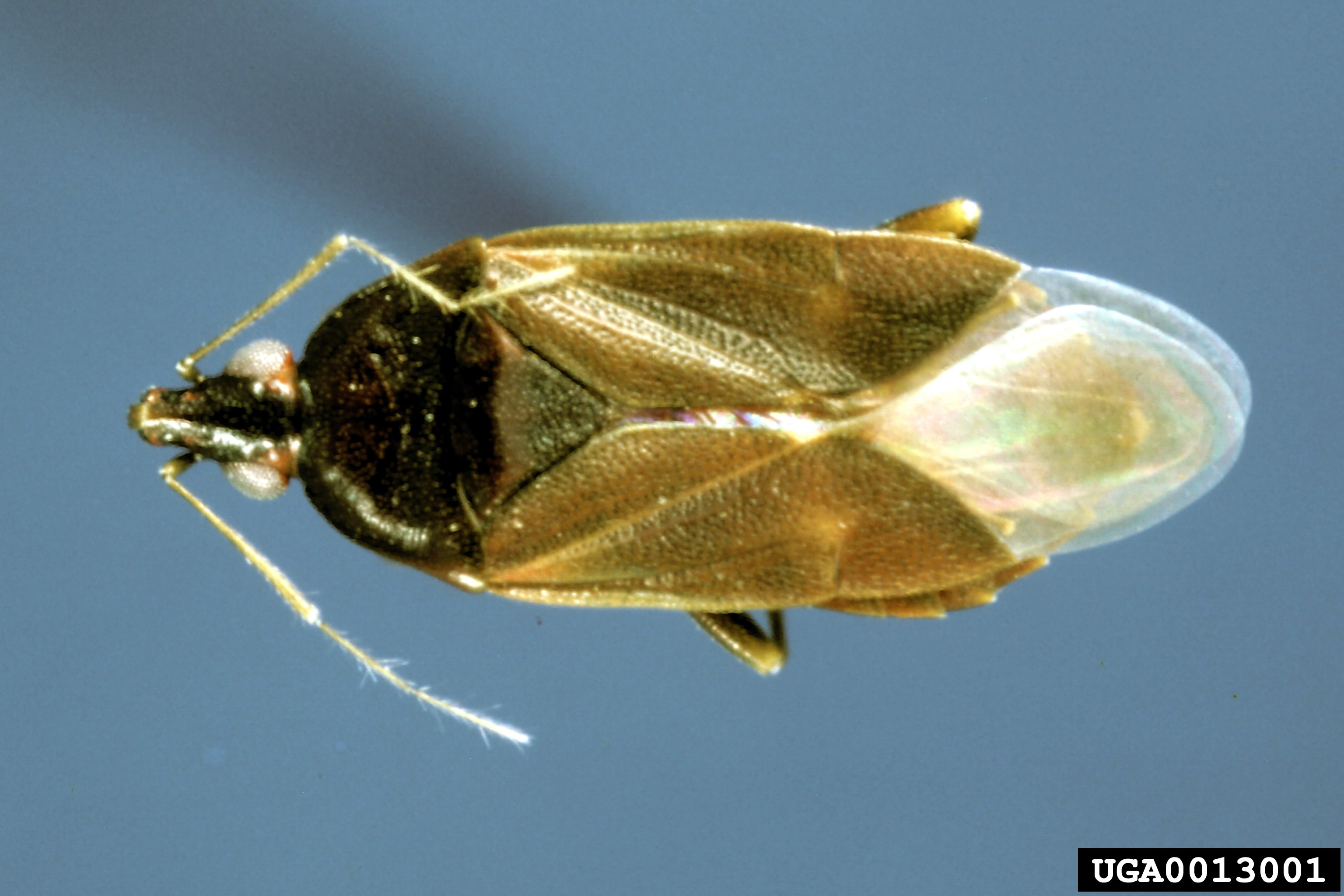

Scientific classification
- Kingdom: Animalia
- Phylum: Arthropoda
- Clade: Pancrustacea
- Class: Insecta
- Order: Hemiptera
- Suborder: Heteroptera
- Family: Anthocoridae
- Tribe: Scolopini
- Genus: Scoloposcelis; Fieber, 1864

= Scoloposcelis =

Genus of true bugs

Scoloposcelis is a genus of minute pirate bugs in the family Anthocoridae. There are about seven described species in Scoloposcelis.

== Species ==
These seven species belong to the genus Scoloposcelis:

- Scoloposcelis basilica Drake and Harris, 1926^{i c g}
- Scoloposcelis flavicornis Reuter, 1871^{i c g b}
- Scoloposcelis koreanus Jung & Yamada^{g}
- Scoloposcelis obscurella (Zetterstedt, 1838)^{g}
- Scoloposcelis parallela (Motschulsky, 1863)^{g}
- Scoloposcelis pulchella (Zetterstedt, 1838)^{i c g b}
- Scoloposcelis seidaii^{g}

Data sources: i = ITIS, c = Catalogue of Life, g = GBIF, b = Bugguide.net
