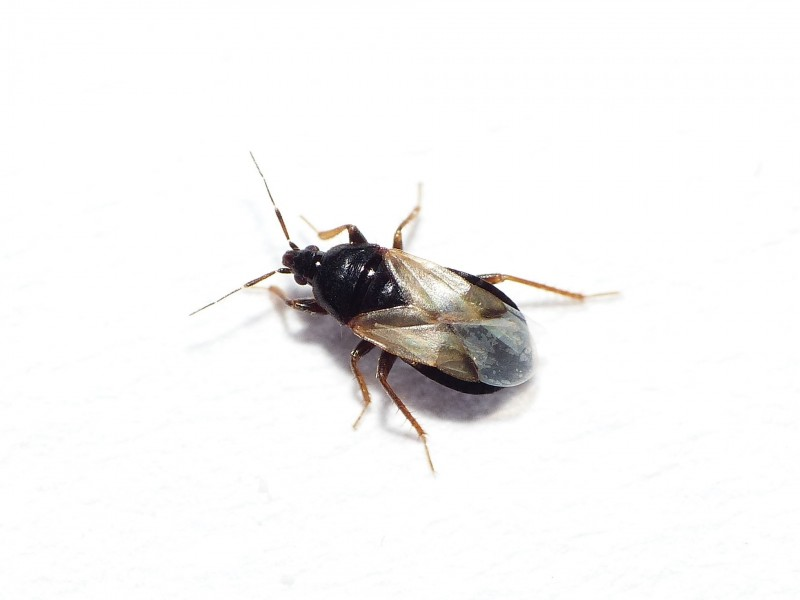
- Xylocoris galactinus

Scientific classification
- Domain: Eukaryota
- Kingdom: Animalia
- Phylum: Arthropoda
- Class: Insecta
- Order: Hemiptera
- Suborder: Heteroptera
- Family: Anthocoridae
- Tribe: Xylocorini
- Genus: Xylocoris; Dufour, 1831

Synonyms
- Piezostethus Fieber, 1860

= Xylocoris =

Genus of true bugs

Xylocoris is a genus of bugs in the monotypic tribe Xylocorini of the family Anthocoridae. There are approximately 50 described species in Xylocoris worldwide. Nearly 30 species occur in the Palaearctic Region, 10 are known from the Nearctic Region, and 6 from the Oriental Region. They occur in various habitats, often found under plant litter and under tree bark where they feed on small arthropods. Certain species (X. afer, X. cerealis, X. cursitans, X. flavipes, X. galactinus, X. hyalinipennis, X. queenslandicus, X. sordidus, X. vicarius) inhabit stored food facilities.

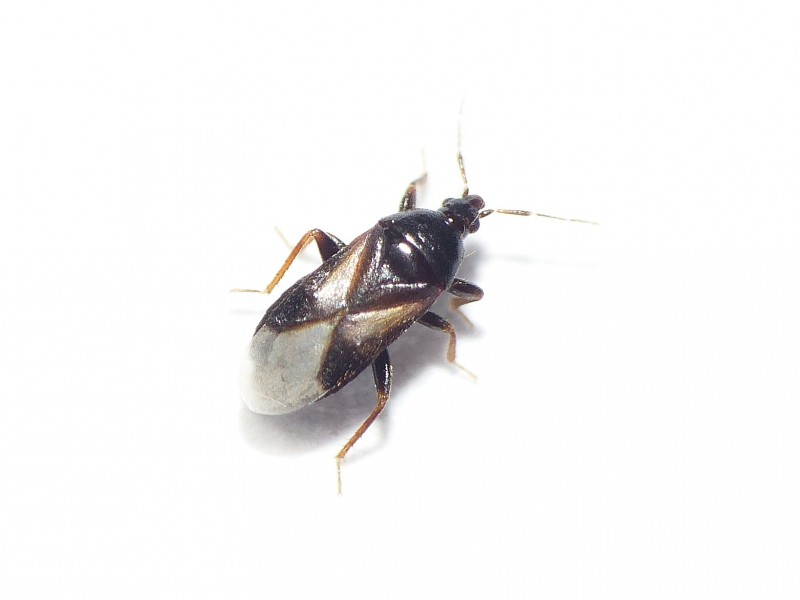
Xylocoris cursitans

== Species ==
- Xylocoris afer (Reuter, 1884)
- Xylocoris betulinus Drake and Harris, 1926
- Xylocoris californicus (Reuter, 1884)
- Xylocoris cerealis Yamada & Yasunaga, 2006
- Xylocoris cursitans (Fallén, 1807)
- Xylocoris flavipes (Reuter, 1875) (warehouse pirate bug)
- Xylocoris formicetorum (Boheman, 1844)
- Xylocoris galactinus (Fieber, 1837)
- Xylocoris hirtus Kelton, 1976
- Xylocoris hiurai Kerzhner & Elov, 1976
- Xylocoris lativentris (J. Sahlberg, 1870)
- Xylocoris obliquus A. Costa, 1853
- Xylocoris parvulus (Reuter, 1871)
- Xylocoris pilipes Kelton, 1976
- Xylocoris punctatus Kelton, 1976
- Xylocoris queenslandicus Gross, 1954
- Xylocoris sordidus (Reuter, 1871)
- Xylocoris vicarius (Reuter, 1884)
