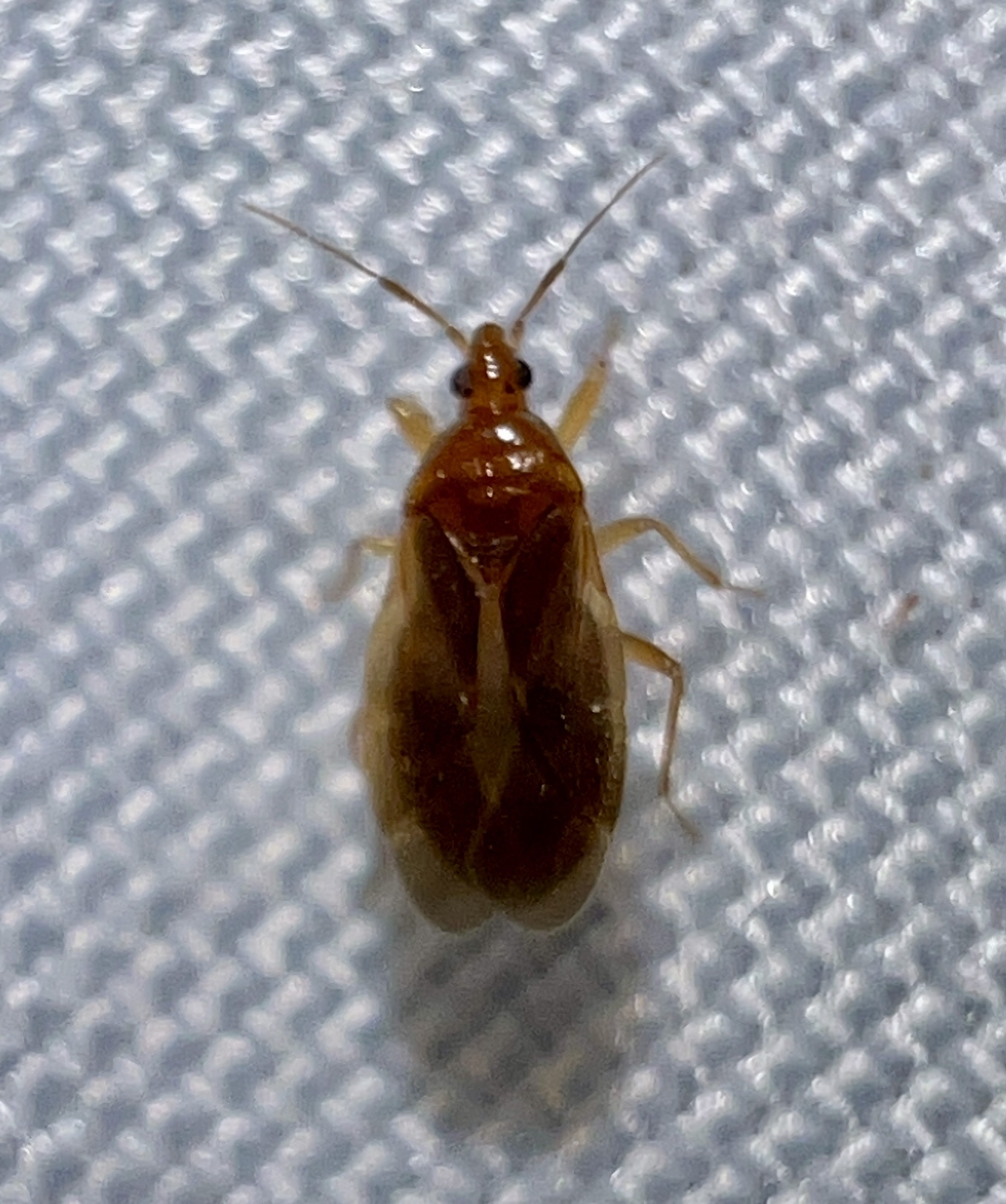
- Lasiochilus hirtellus

Scientific classification
- Kingdom: Animalia
- Phylum: Arthropoda
- Clade: Pancrustacea
- Class: Insecta
- Order: Hemiptera
- Suborder: Heteroptera
- Family: Anthocoridae
- Subfamily: Lasiochilinae
- Genus: Lasiochilus; Reuter, 1871

Subgenera
- Lasiochilus (Dilasia) Reuter, 1871; Lasiochilus (Lasiochilus) Reuter, 1884

= Lasiochilus =

Genus of true bugs

Lasiochilus is a genus of true bugs in the subfamily Lasiochilinae and tribe Lasiochilini. There are about 17 described species in the genus Lasiochilus.

== Species ==
These 17 species belong to the genus Lasiochilus:

- Lasiochilus ather Herring
- Lasiochilus comitalis Drake & Harris, 1926
- Lasiochilus decolor (White, 1879)
- Lasiochilus denigratus (White, 1879)
- Lasiochilus divisus Champion, 1900
- Lasiochilus fusculus (Reuter, 1871)
- Lasiochilus gerhardi Blatchley, 1926
- Lasiochilus hirtellus Drake & Harris, 1926
- Lasiochilus microps Champion, 1900
- Lasiochilus mirificus Drake & Harris, 1926
- Lasiochilus montivagus Kirkaldy, 1908
- Lasiochilus nubigenus Kirkaldy, 1908
- Lasiochilus palauensis Herring
- Lasiochilus pallidulus Reuter, 1871
- Lasiochilus silvicola Kirkaldy, 1908
- Lasiochilus socialis Drake & Harris
- Lasiochilus varicolor Uhler, 1894
