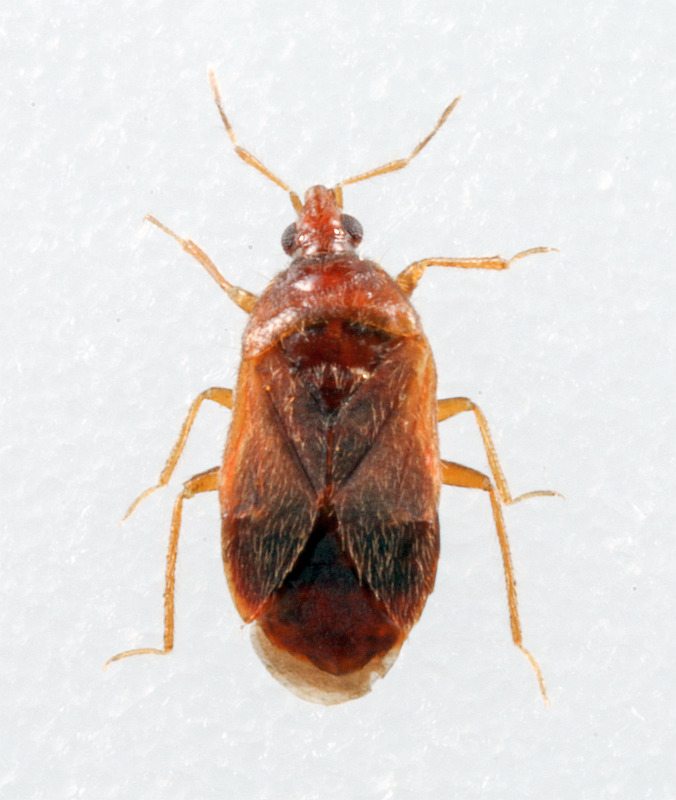
- Cardiastethus fasciiventris

Scientific classification
- Kingdom: Animalia
- Phylum: Arthropoda
- Class: Insecta
- Order: Hemiptera
- Suborder: Heteroptera
- Family: Anthocoridae
- Tribe: Dufouriellini
- Genus: Cardiastethus; Fieber, 1860

Synonyms
- Dasypterus Reuter, 1871; Orthosolenia Reuter, 1884

= Cardiastethus =

Genus of true bugs

Cardiastethus is a genus of minute pirate bugs in the family Anthocoridae. There are more than 20 described species in Cardiastethus.

== Species ==
These 23 species belong to the genus Cardiastethus:

- Cardiastethus assimilis (Reuter, 1871)^{i c g b}
- Cardiastethus borealis Kelton, 1977^{i c g b}
- Cardiastethus brevirostris
- Cardiastethus brounianus
- Cardiastethus consors
- Cardiastethus elegans
- Cardiastethus exiguus Poppius, 1913^{g}
- Cardiastethus fasciiventris (Garbiglietti, 1869)^{g}
- Cardiastethus flaveolus Blatchley, 1928^{i c g}
- Cardiastethus flavus Poppius, 1909^{g}
- Cardiastethus fulvescens (Walker, 1872)^{i c}
- Cardiastethus hiurai
- Cardiastethus kathmandu
- Cardiastethus laeviusculus Poppius, 1915^{g}
- Cardiastethus linnavuorii
- Cardiastethus longiceps Poppius, 1915^{g}
- Cardiastethus luridellus (Fieber, 1860)^{i c g}
- Cardiastethus minutissimus Usinger, 1946^{i c g}
- Cardiastethus nazarenus Reuter, 1884^{g}
- Cardiastethus nepalensis
- Cardiastethus pergandei Reuter, 1884^{i c g}
- Cardiastethus poweri
- Cardiastethus pseudococci Wagner, 1951^{g}

Data sources: i = ITIS, c = Catalogue of Life, g = GBIF, b = Bugguide.net
