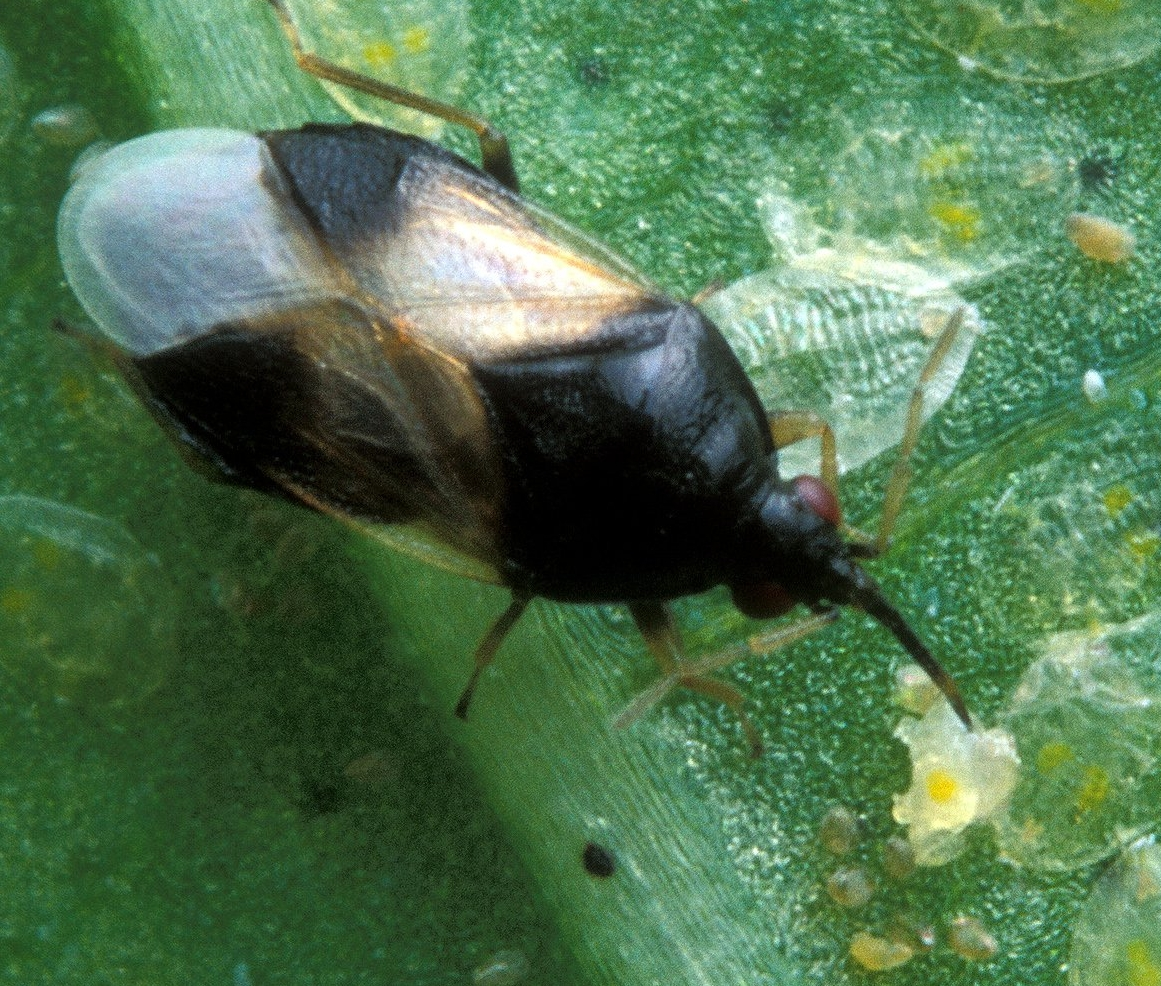
- Orius insidiosus feeding on white fly nymphs

Scientific classification
- Kingdom: Animalia
- Phylum: Arthropoda
- Clade: Pancrustacea
- Class: Insecta
- Order: Hemiptera
- Suborder: Heteroptera
- Family: Anthocoridae
- Genus: Orius
- Species: O. insidiosus

Binomial name
- Orius insidiosus (Say, 1832)

= Orius insidiosus =

Species of minute pirate bug

Orius insidiosus, common name the insidious flower bug, is a species of minute pirate bug, a predatory insect in the order Hemiptera (the true bugs). They are considered beneficial, as they feed on small pest arthropods and their eggs. They are mass-reared for use in the biological control of thrips.

== Description ==
Orius insidiosus adults are approximately 3 mm in length. This oval-shaped insect is black with white patches on the wings. Nymphs of this species are teardrop-shaped and wingless. They range from yellow-orange to brown in colour.

== Distribution ==
This species is common throughout the United States, and extends into Canada, Mexico, Central and South America. It also occurs in Cuba, Puerto Rico, and other islands of the West Indies.

== Life cycle ==
The female lays her eggs inside plant tissues, where they hatch into nymphs. Growth time from egg to mature adult takes at least 20 days. It is possible for several generations to occur during a single growing season.

== Diet ==
Orius insidiosus prey on plant-eating (phytophagous) mites and their eggs, various insect eggs, and other soft-bodied arthropods such as thrips, spider mites, and small caterpillars. They also feed on the eggs and new larvae of the bollworm, spotted tobacco aphids, corn earworm, European corn borers (Ostrinia nubilalis), corn leaf aphids (Rhopalosiphum maidis), potato aphids (Macrosiphum euphorbiae), and potato leafhopper (Empoasca fabae) nymphs.

They are used in orchards to help control the European red mite (Panonychus ulmi), the twospotted spider mite (Tetranychus urticae), and most species of aphids. Orius insidiosus can also feed on plants and pollen.

== Behaviour ==
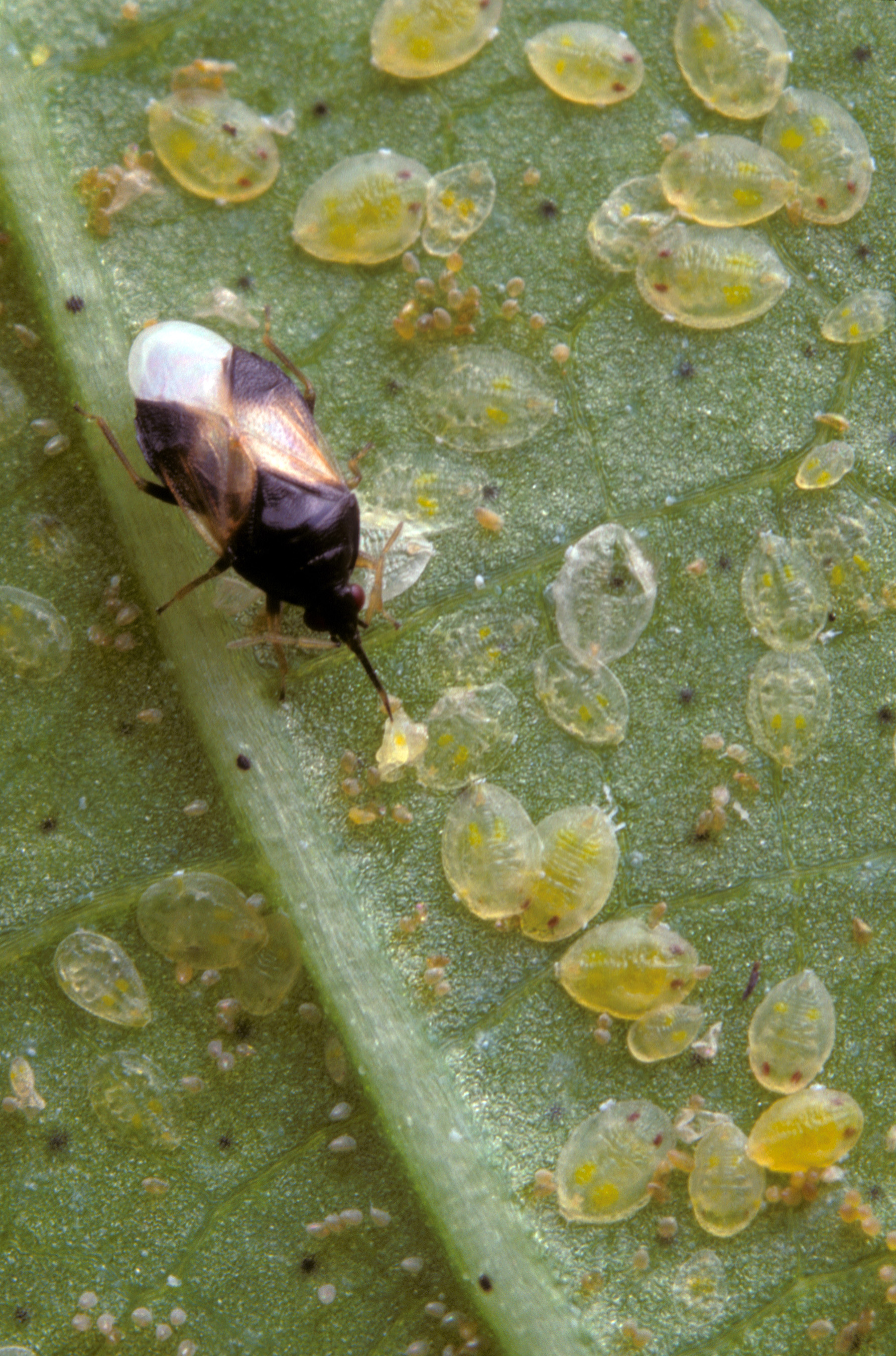
Orius insidiosus feeding

Both nymphs and adults feed. The adults are voracious predators and exhibit efficient searching behaviour. They gathering in areas where the density of prey is high. They are also able to grow more rapidly in environments where prey is abundant.

Orius insidiosus seizes its prey using its front legs and then inserts its long beak into its victim's body. It usually reinserts its beak several times until the soft body of the host has been emptied, leaving behind the drained exoskeleton.

Orius insidiosus occasionally bites humans. Although the bite can be considered disproportionately painful relative to the size of this species, it is not harmful.

== Habitat ==
This species can be found on numerous crops, including most deciduous fruits, grapes, alfalfa, cotton, corn, and soybeans.

== See also ==
- Beneficial insects
