= Coccivora =

Scientific classification
- Kingdom: Animalia
- Phylum: Arthropoda
- Clade: Pancrustacea
- Class: Insecta
- Order: Hemiptera
- Suborder: Heteroptera
- Family: Anthocoridae
- Genus: Coccivora; McAtee & Malloch, 1925
- Species: C. californica

Binomial name
- Coccivora californica Mcatee & Malloch, 1925

Genus of true bugs

Coccivora is a genus of minute pirate bugs in the family Anthocoridae. There is one described species in Coccivora, C. californica.
