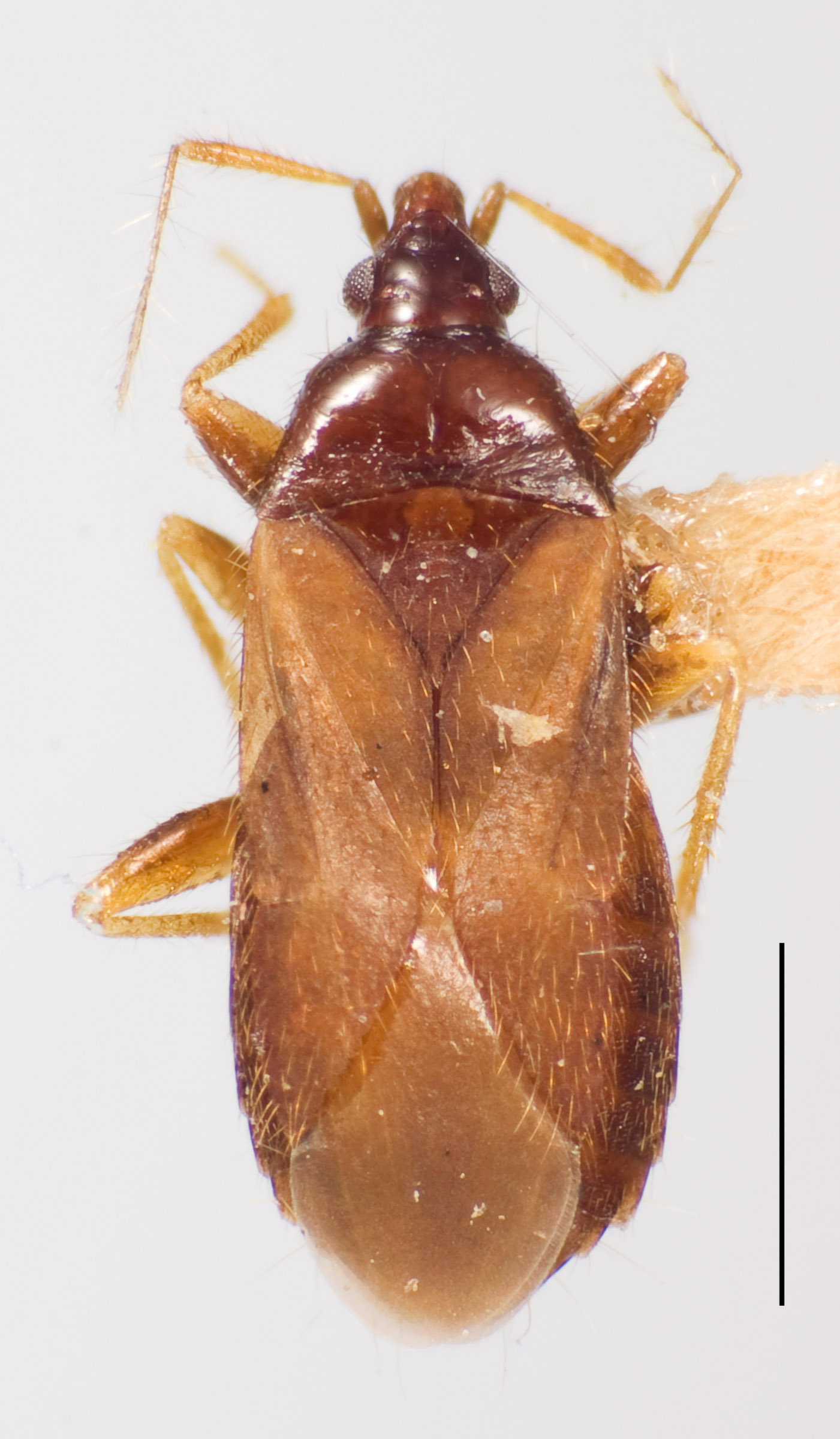
- Lasiochilus fusculus

Scientific classification
- Kingdom: Animalia
- Phylum: Arthropoda
- Clade: Pancrustacea
- Class: Insecta
- Order: Hemiptera
- Suborder: Heteroptera
- Family: Anthocoridae
- Subfamily: Lasiochilinae; Carayon, 1972

= Lasiochilinae =

Family of true bugs

Lasiochilinae is a subfamily of bugs, in the family Anthocoridae; some authorities place this at family level: "Lasiochilidae". It is most diverse in tropical areas, especially in the New World.

== Tribes and genera ==
BioLib includes:

tribe Lasiochilini Carayon, 1972

1. Lasiochilus Reuter, 1871
2. Plochiocoris Champion, 1900

incertae sedis

1. Eusolenophora Poppius, 1909
2. Lasiellidea Reuter, 1895
3. Lasiocolpus Reuter, 1884
4. Oplobates Reuter, 1895
5. Plochiocorella Poppius, 1909

=== Systematics ===
Phylogenetic work in 1991 and later in 2009 suggested that "Lasiochilidae" could be treated as a family separate from Anthocoridae (as well as the recognition of the family Lyctocoridae). This has been followed by some studies but not others.

== Description ==
Lasiochilinae are similar to other Anthocoridae (if treated as its own family, it is similar to Lyctocoridae and to Anthocoridae), such as male genitalia being asymmetrical with a reduced right paramere. An apomorphy of the group is the first two abdominal segments having a single pair of dorsal laterotergites, while the rest have a simple tergal plate. The spermatheca of females is in the shape of a vermiform gland.

== Habitat and behaviour ==
Species mostly feed on other small soft-bodied arthropods.

They do not perform traumatic insemination, unlike their relatives.
