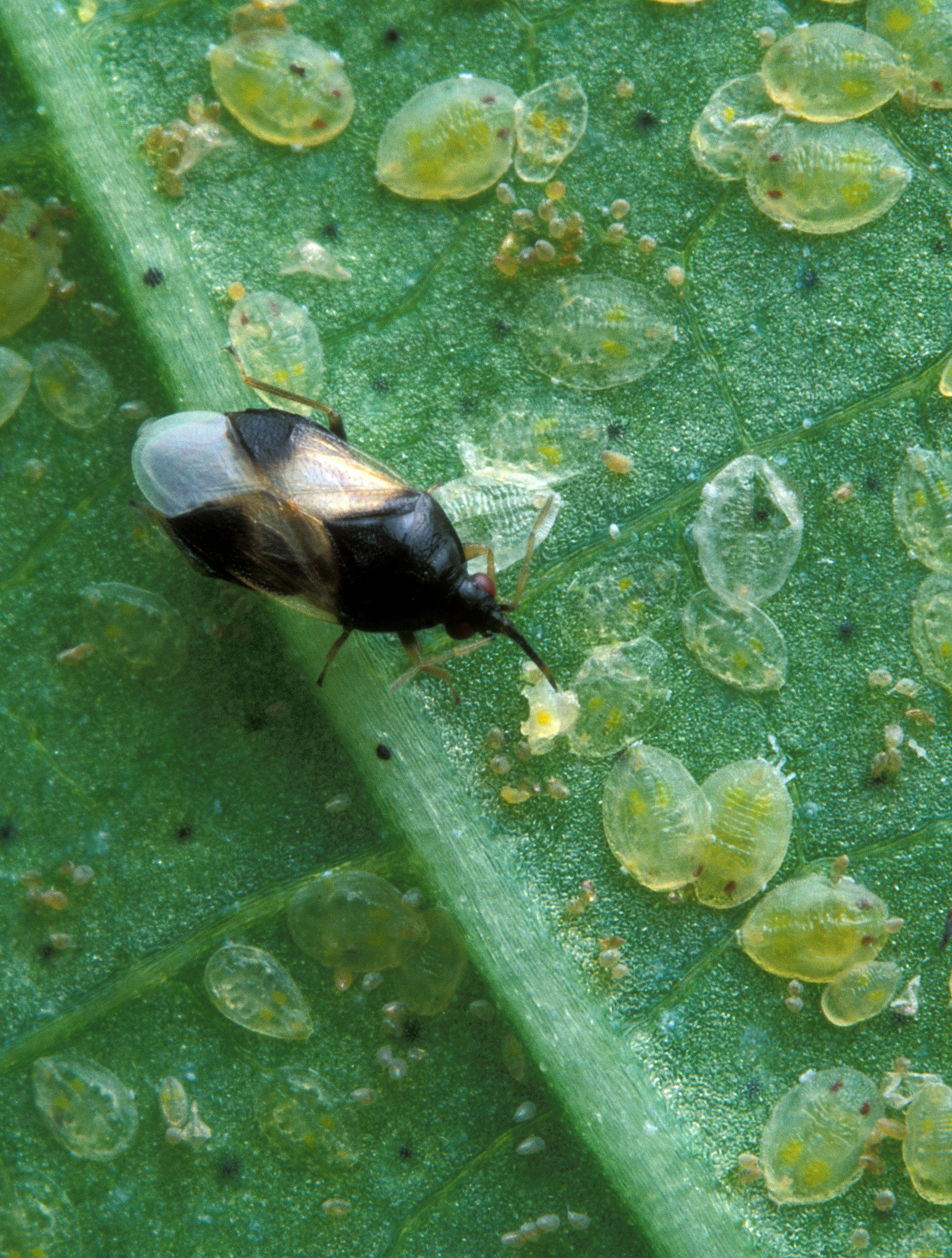
- Orius insidiosus

Scientific classification
- Kingdom: Animalia
- Phylum: Arthropoda
- Class: Insecta
- Order: Hemiptera
- Suborder: Heteroptera
- Superfamily: Cimicoidea
- Family: Anthocoridae; Fieber, 1837

Tribes
- see text

= Anthocoridae =

Minute pirate bugs

Family of true bugs

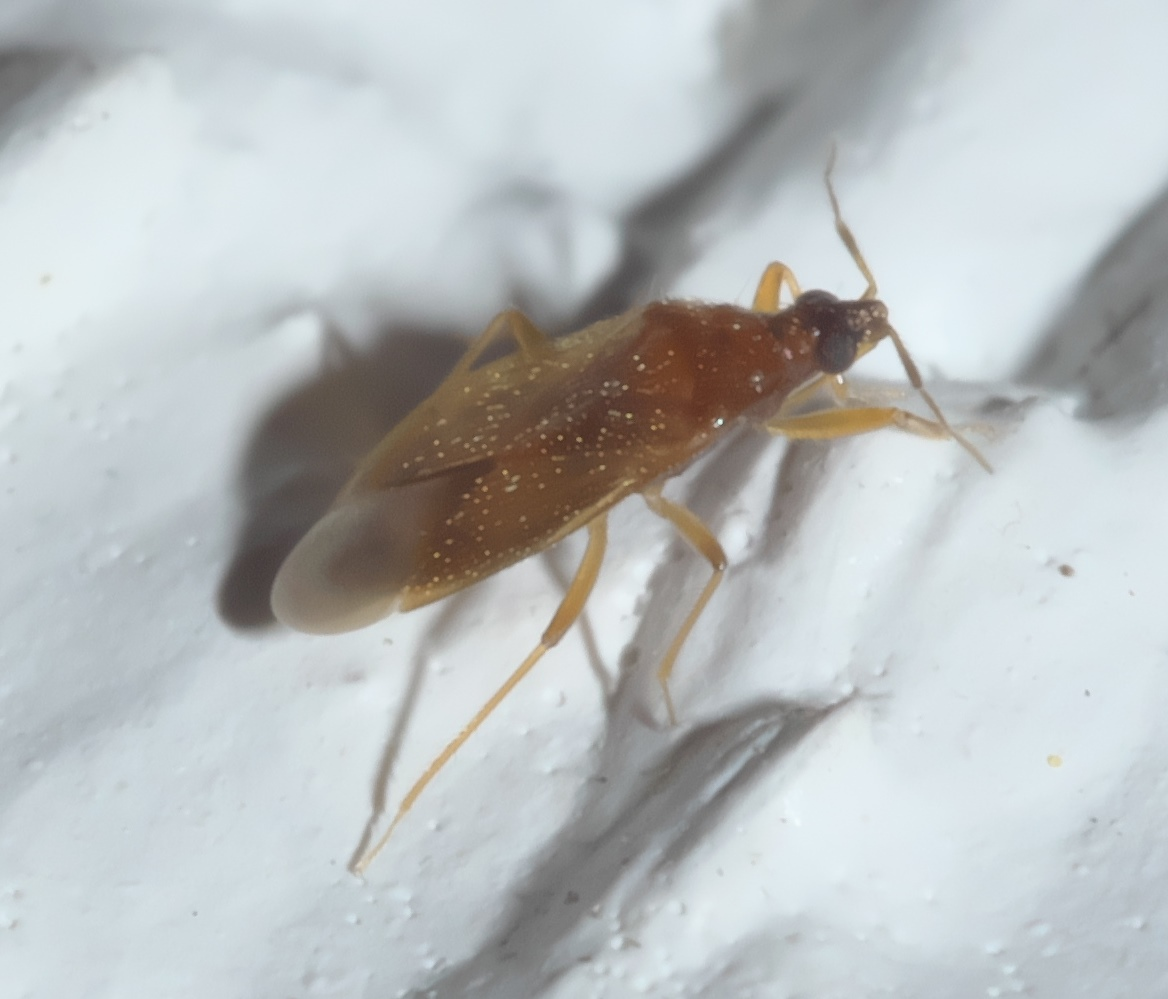
Amphiareus obscuriceps

Anthocoridae is a family of bugs, commonly called minute pirate bugs or flower bugs. Worldwide there are 500 to 600 species.

== Description ==
Anthocoridae are 1.5–5 mm long and have soft, elongated oval, flat bodies, often patterned in black and white. The head is extended forward and the antennae are longer than the head and visible from above. They possess a piercing and sucking three-segmented beak or labium used to inject prey with digestive enzymes and consume food. In general appearance, they resemble common plant bugs (Miridae), but Anthocoridae differ by their possession of two ocelli as adults. Anthocorids possess two pairs of wings with hemelytra and membranous hindwings.

Many species are referred to as insidious flower bugs or pirate bugs. The scientific name is a combination of the Greek words anthos "flower" and koris "bug".

== Habitat and behaviour ==
Many species can be found in cryptic habitats such as galls, but can also be present in open surface environments. They can often be found in many agricultural crops. They can feed on plant material, but mostly feed on other small soft-bodied arthropods. Anthocorids are often predacious both as nymphs and adults. They are beneficial as biological control agents. Orius insidiosus, the "insidious flower bug", for example, feeds on the eggs of the corn earworm (Helicoverpa zea). Orius insidiosus is often released in greenhouses against mites and thrips.

Eggs are laid in plant material and hatch in approximately 3 to 5 days. Nymphs require at least 20 days to progress through five instars. Adults live for approximately 35 days. These small insects can bite humans, however, they do not feed on human blood or inject venom or saliva. Reactions to bites in individuals can range from no effect to minor swelling and irritation.

== Systematics ==
There are two subfamilies and at least 8 tribes:

=== Anthocorinae ===
Auth. Fieber, 1837

tribe Almeidini Carayon, 1972

1. Almeida Distant, 1910
2. Australmeida Woodward, 1977
3. Lippomanus Distant, 1904

tribe Anthocorini Fieber, 1837

Selected genera:

- Acompocoris Reuter, 1875^{i c g b}
- Anthocoris Fallen, 1814^{i c g b}
- Coccivora McAtee & Malloch, 1925^{i c g b}
- Dufouriellus Kirkaldy, 1906
- Elatophilus Reuter, 1884^{i c g b}
- Melanocoris Champion, 1900^{i c g b}
- Temnostethus Fieber, 1860^{i c g b}
- Tetraphleps Fieber, 1860^{i c g b}

tribe Blaptopstethini Carayon, 1972

1. Blaptostethoides Carayon, 1972
2. Blaptostethus Fieber, 1860

tribe Dufouriellini Van Duzee, 1916

Selected genera:

- Amphiareus Distant, 1904
- Brachysteles Mulsant & Rey, 1852
- Buchananiella Reuter, 1884
- Cardiastethus Fieber, 1860

tribe Oriini Carayon, 1955

Selected genera:

- Orius Wolff, 1811^{i c g b}

tribe Scolopini Carayon, 1954

Selected genera:

- Calliodis Reuter, 1871
- Scoloposcelis Fieber, 1864

tribe Xylocorini Carayon, 1972 (monotypic)

1. Xylocoris Dufour, 1831

incertae sedis

1. Cyrtosternum Fieber, 1860

=== Lasiochilinae ===
Auth. Carayon, 1972 (sometimes placed at family level: "Lasiochilidae")

- tribe Lasiochilini Carayon, 1972
1. Lasiochilus Reuter, 1871
2. Plochiocoris Champion, 1900
- genera incertae sedis

=== Unplaced genera ===
1. Lilia White, 1879
2. Opisthypselus Reuter, 1908
- 4 fossil genera

Data sources: i = ITIS, c = Catalogue of Life, g = GBIF, b = Bugguide.net
