= Aphrastomedes =

Aphrastomedes Temporal range: Upper Cretaceous

Scientific classification
- Domain: Eukaryota
- Kingdom: Animalia
- Phylum: Arthropoda
- Class: Insecta
- Order: Hemiptera
- Suborder: Heteroptera
- Family: Velocipedidae
- Genus: †Aphrastomedes; Yamada & Yamamoto, 2018
- Species: †A. anthocoroides

Binomial name
- †Aphrastomedes anthocoroides Yamada & Yamamoto, 2018

Genus of true bugs

Aphrastomedes is an extinct genus of cimicomorphan true bug in the order Heteroptera. It contains a single species, Aphrastomedes anthocoroides, known from two specimens found in Upper Cretaceous Burmese amber.

== Classification ==
It probably belongs to the family Velocipedidae; if so, it is the first amber fossil known of this family.

== Biology ==
The known male specimen of Aphrastomedes features small white Acari on the ventral surface of thorax and abdomen, hinting at an association with phoretic mites shared with living Velocipedidae.

== See also ==
- Insect paleobiota of Burmese amber
