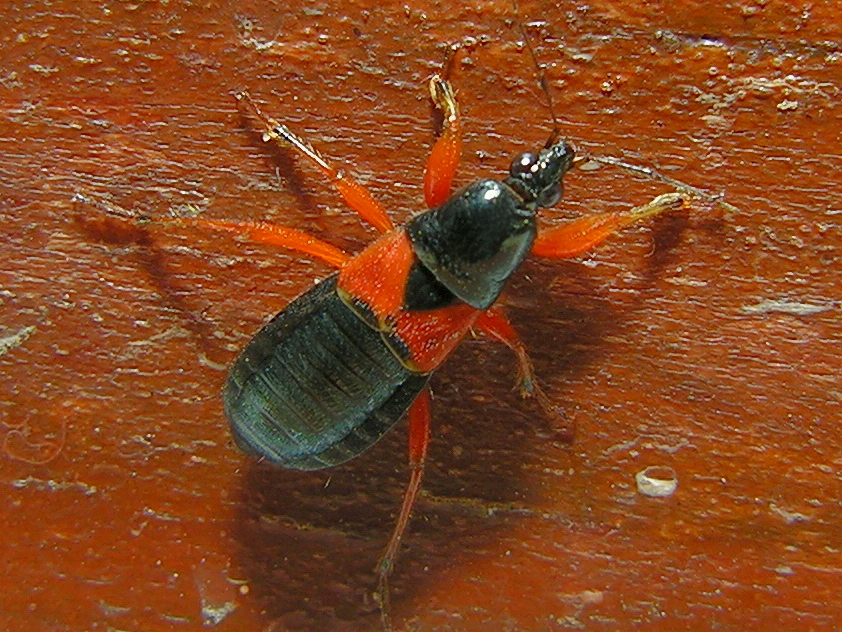
- Prostemma guttula

Scientific classification
- Domain: Eukaryota
- Kingdom: Animalia
- Phylum: Arthropoda
- Class: Insecta
- Order: Hemiptera
- Suborder: Heteroptera
- Infraorder: Cimicomorpha
- Family: Nabidae
- Subfamily: Prostemmatinae
- Genus: Prostemma; Laporte, 1832

= Prostemma =

Genus of true bugs

Prostemma is a genus of bugs in the family Nabidae, subfamily Prostemmatinae and tribe Prostemmatini.

== Species ==
The following species are included:

- Prostemma aeneicolle Stein, 1857
- Prostemma albimacula Stein, 1857
- Prostemma antipodes Kerzhner, 1990
- Prostemma australicum Kerzhner & Strommer, 1990
- Prostemma bicolor Rambur, 1839
- Prostemma carduelis Dohrn, 1858
- Prostemma concinnum Walker, 1873
- Prostemma fasciatum (Stal, 1873)
- Prostemma guttula (Fabricius, 1787)
- Prostemma hilgendorfii Stein, 1878
- Prostemma kiborti Jakovlev, 1889
- Prostemma oeningensis Heer, 1853
- Prostemma reuteri Kerzhner, 1990
- Prostemma sanguineum (Rossi, 1790)
- Prostemma walkeri Kerzhner & Strommer, 1990

Note: Prostemma pallidiceps Stål, 1860 is a synonym of Pagasa pallidiceps (Stål, 1860)
