= Pagasa =

Pagasa or PAGASA may refer to:

- Pagasa (bug), an insect genus in the family Nabidae
- Philippine Atmospheric, Geophysical and Astronomical Services Administration
- "May Pagasa", a pen-name of José Rizal
- Pagasae or Pagasa, a city of ancient Thessaly
- Pagasa Island (or Pag-asa, or Thitu Island), a disputed island controlled by the Philippines

== See also ==
- Pag-asa (disambiguation)
