= Loricula bipunctata =

Scientific classification
- Domain: Eukaryota
- Kingdom: Animalia
- Phylum: Arthropoda
- Class: Insecta
- Order: Hemiptera
- Suborder: Heteroptera
- Family: Microphysidae
- Genus: Loricula
- Species: L. bipunctata

Binomial name
- Loricula bipunctata (Perris, 1857)

Species of true bug

Loricula bipunctata is a species of minute bladder bug in the family Microphysidae. It is found in Europe and Northern Asia (excluding China) and North America.
