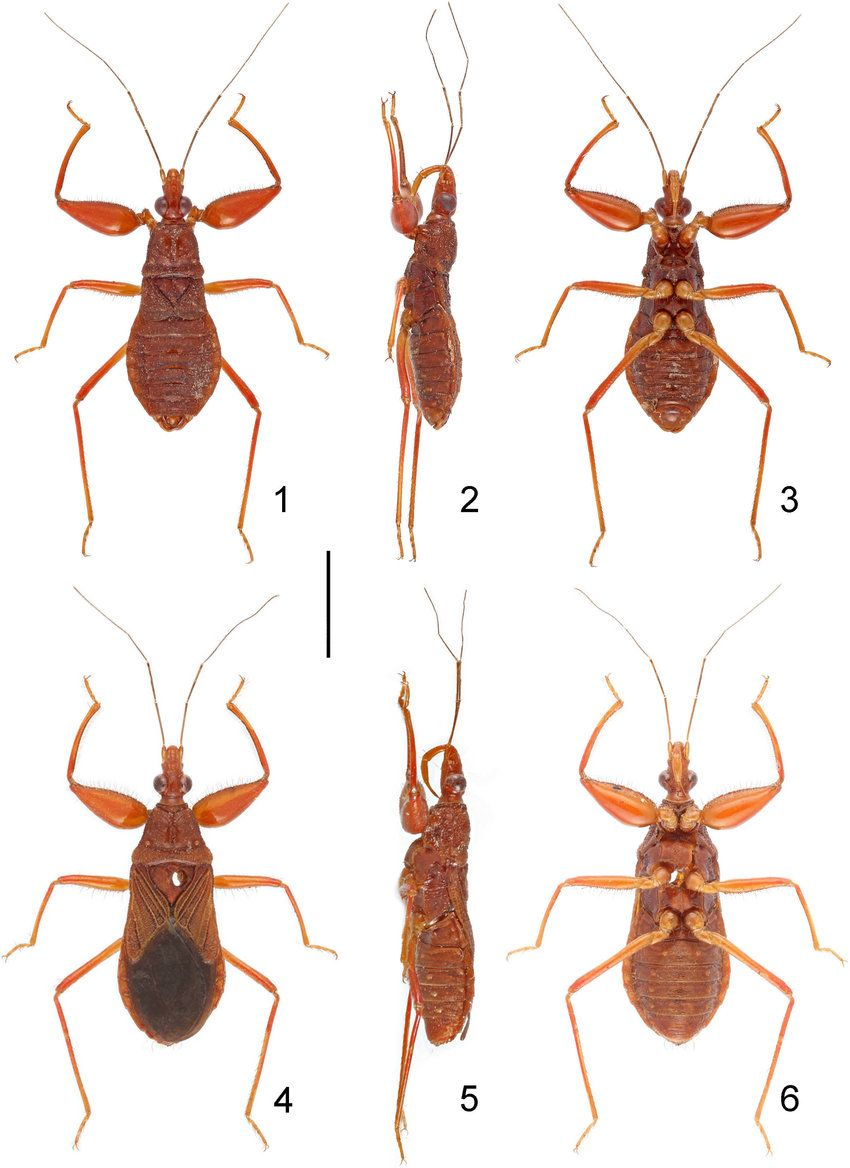
- Camarochiloides weiweii. 1–3 – brachypterous male; 4–6 – macropterous female. 1, 4 – dorsal view; 2, 5 – lateral view; 3, 6 – ventral view. Scale bar = 3.00 mm.

Scientific classification
- Kingdom: Animalia
- Phylum: Arthropoda
- Clade: Pancrustacea
- Class: Insecta
- Order: Hemiptera
- Suborder: Heteroptera
- Infraorder: Cimicomorpha
- Family: Pachynomidae; Stål, 1873

= Pachynomidae =

Pachynomidae Temporal range: Cenomanian–Recent

Family of insects

Pachynomidae is a family of true bugs within the suborder Cimicomorpha. 23 species in 5 genera are known.

== Morphology ==
Pachynomidae range in size from 3.5 to 11 millimetres and often bear a certain resemblance to sickle bugs (Nabidae) from the subfamily Prostemmatinae. The upper surface of their bodies varies from very shiny (genus Pachynomus ) to matte and hairless to heavily hairy. The compound eyes are large, and the head has no constriction behind the compound eyes. Ocelli can be present or absent. The antennae appear to have five segments, with the second segment (pedicellus) divided into two parts. The distal part of the pedicellus usually bears a single trichobothrium. The labium is thick and strongly curved. The thighs (femora ) of the forelegs are greatly enlarged, and the shins (tibiae) of the forelegs bear fossulae spongiosae (specialised hairy structures used for holding on). The eighth abdominal segment of the males is reduced and retracted into the seventh segment. Male genitalia are symmetrical, the pygophore is well developed and apically articulated into the abdomen. The ovipositor of the females is plate-shaped. A spermatheca is missing, but a pseudospermatheca is present.

== Biology ==
The biology of Pachynomidae is poorly known. Museums contain only few samples of Pachynomidae, as they are often confused with Nabidae or Reduviidae. It is possible that Pachynomidae are noctural ground-dwelling predators, as they are often collected from leaf litter or light traps. Immature forms are not known for most genera, with the exception of Aphelonotus.

Few species seem to show sexual dimorphism; it has been described in the genera Aphelonotus and Camarochilus. Some species show wing dimorphism; it is known in Aphelonotus simplus males and Camarochilus americanus females, while the species Camarochiloides weiweii presents both brachypterous and macropterous morphs across sexes.

== Taxonomy ==
The current genus Pachynomus was considered a subgenus of the genus Reduvius by its first describer Klug in 1830. Carl Stål placed it and the genus Punctius in Nabidae, where they remained, confirmed by many subsequent authors (with the exception of Reuter 1908), until Carayon elevated the group to family rank in 1950. He considered the family to be most closely related to the assassin bugs (Reduviidae) due to the characteristics of the reproductive organs. Analysis of the mitochondrial genome recovered them as the sister group of Reduviidae. Only a single fossil taxon, Cretispongiosus conservatus from mid-Cretaceous Burmese Amber has been reported among this family, which belongs to Pachynominae.

The family includes the following subfamilies and genera:

Subfamily Aphelonotinae

Genus Aphelonotus (tropical America, Central Africa)

Subfamily Pachynominae

Genus Camarochilus (tropics of the New World)
Genus Camarochiloides (Old World)
Genus Pachynomus (Africa to India)
Genus Punctius (Africa to India)
