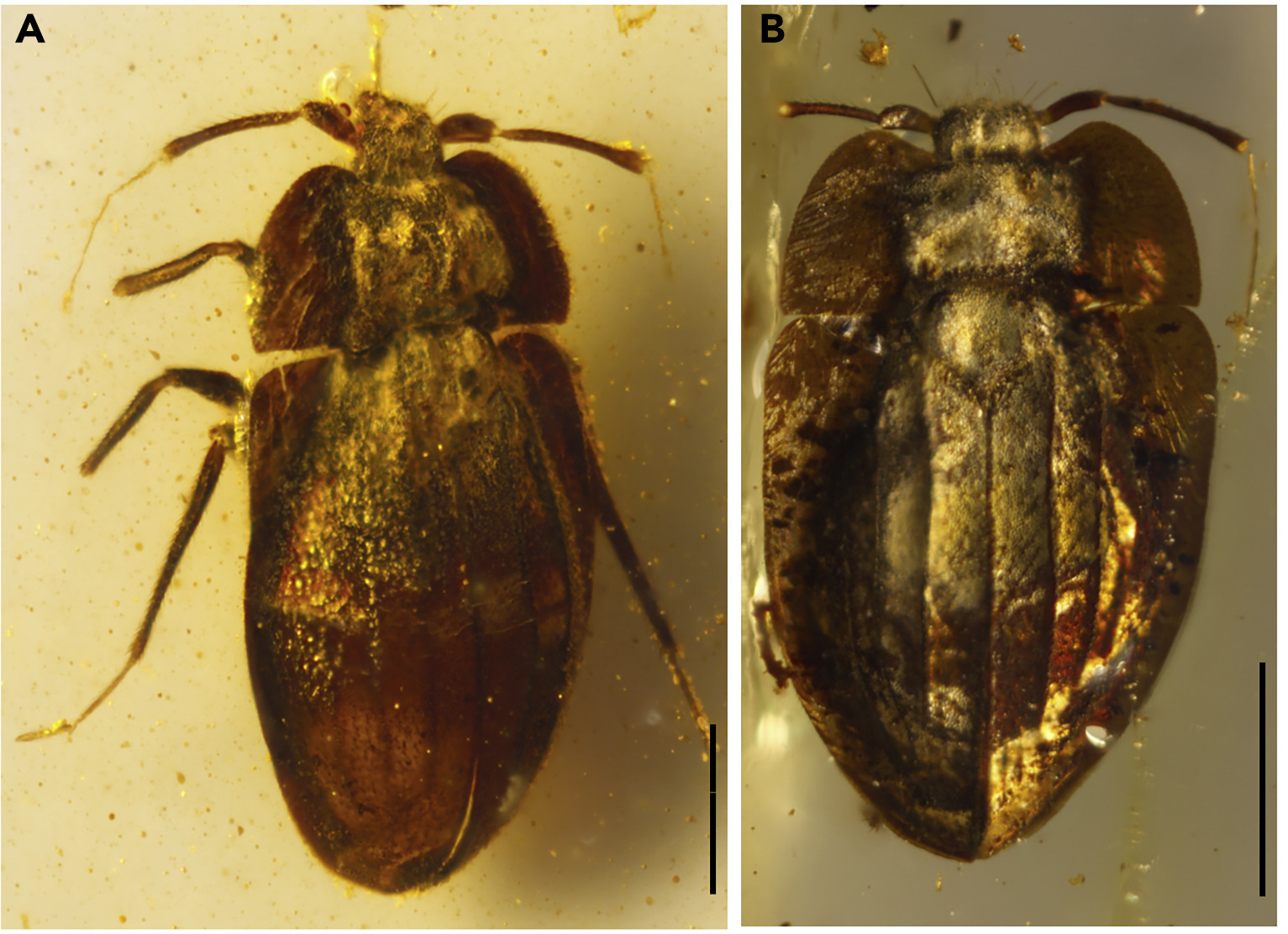
- B. coleopteromorpha (left) and B. vampirica (right)

Scientific classification
- Kingdom: Animalia
- Phylum: Arthropoda
- Class: Insecta
- Order: Hemiptera
- Suborder: Heteroptera
- Infraorder: Cimicomorpha
- Superfamily: Miroidea
- Family: †Berstidae; Tihelka et al. 2020
- Genus: †Bersta; Tihelka et al. 2020

Species
- B. coleopteromorpha Tihelka et al., 2020; B. vampirica Tihelka et al., 2020

= Bersta =

Bersta Temporal range: Cenomanian

Extinct genus of true bugs

Bersta is an extinct genus of hemipteran in the monotypic family Berstidae. It is known from two species found in the Cenomanian aged Burmese amber of Myanmar. The external morphology suggests that the genus were beetle mimics.

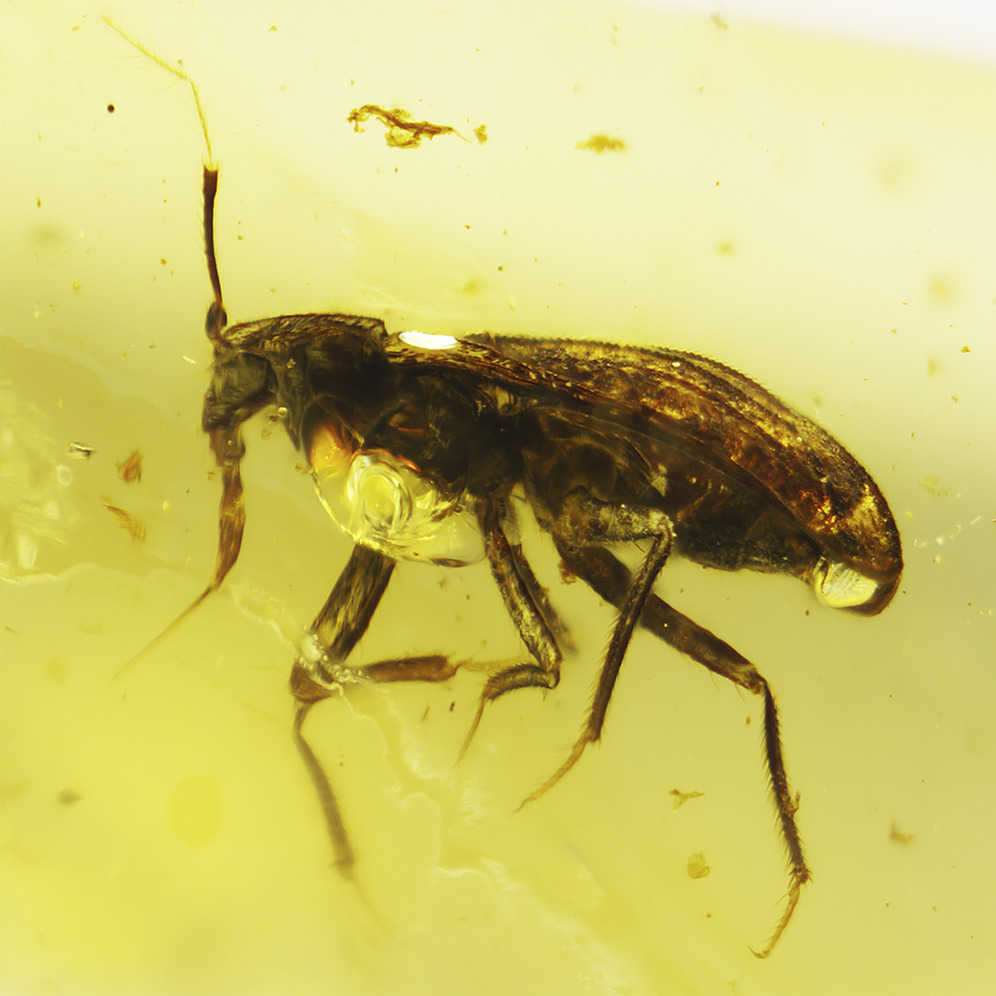
Lateral view of Bersta

== Etymology ==
The genus is named after Berstuk, a shapeshifting Slavic forest deity of the Sorb and Wend peoples.

== Morphology ==
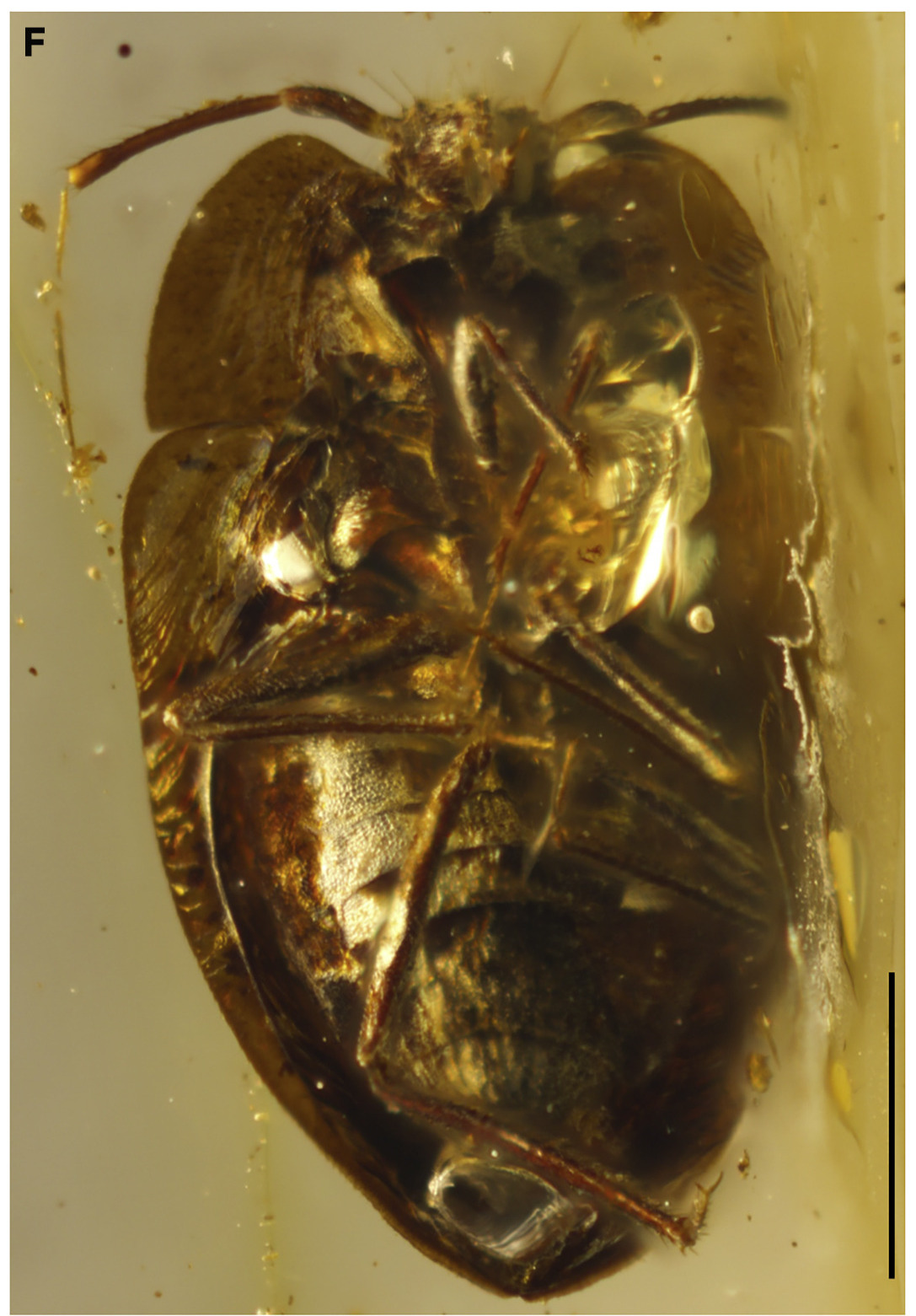
Bersta vampirica ventral

The length of the members of the genus is less than 2.6 mm, the abdominal trichobothria are absent, the abdominal spiracles are on unified sternal plates, and each hemelytron has three longitudinal veins present.

== Ecology ==
The authors of the describing paper stated that the morphology strongly resembled those of beetles belonging to the families Tenebrionidae, Trogossitidae and Nitidulidae. They proposed the Bersta could have been an aggressive mimic, using its morphology to fool potential prey by resembling them.

== Phylogeny ==
A phylogenetic analysis found the genus to be a member of Miroidea, and the sister family to Tingidae.
