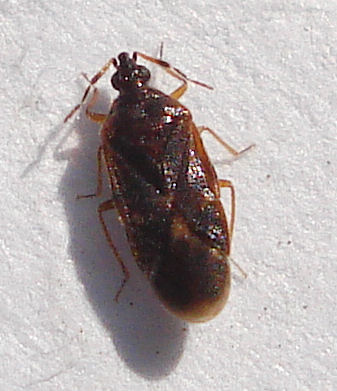

Scientific classification
- Kingdom: Animalia
- Phylum: Arthropoda
- Class: Insecta
- Order: Hemiptera
- Suborder: Heteroptera
- Family: Microphysidae
- Genus: Loricula
- Species: L. pselaphiformis

Binomial name
- Loricula pselaphiformis Curtis, 1833

= Loricula pselaphiformis =

Species of true bug

Loricula pselaphiformis is a species of minute bladder bug in the family Microphysidae. It is found in Africa, Europe, and Northern Asia (excluding China), and North America.
