= Daniel Rosenfeld (academic) =

Israeli atmospheric scientist

- דניאל רוזנפלד
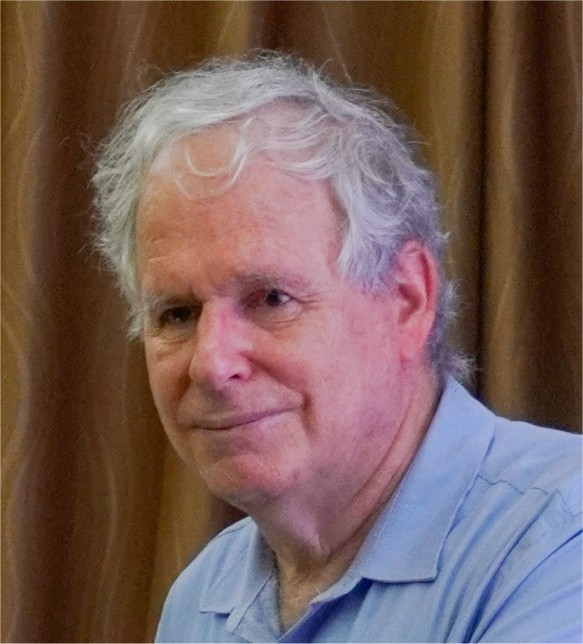
- Born: June 21, 1952 (age 74); Kfar Saba, Israel
- Occupations: Atmospheric scientist and academic
- Known for: Aerosol-cloud-precipitation interactions; aerosol convective invigoration; aerosol effects on lightning and tropical cyclones; weather modification; cloud-mediated aerosol forcing
- Awards: EMET Prize;Clarivate Highly Cited Researcher

Academic background
- Education: The Hebrew University; B.Sc., Geology; M.Sc., Atmospheric Sciences; Ph.D., Atmospheric Sciences

Daniel Rosenfeld (born June 21, 1952) (Hebrew: דניאל רוזנפלד) is an Israeli atmospheric scientist and academic. He is a Professor Emeritus at The Hebrew University as well as an Adjunct Professor at Texas A&M University, Nanjing University, and Wuhan University.

Rosenfeld's research has explored how aerosols influence cloud processes and precipitation, demonstrating that while particulate air pollution suppresses rainfall from shallow clouds, it intensifies deep convection, increasing lightning, hail, tornado severity, and hurricane expansion and weakening, whereas large sea salt aerosols mitigate these effects. His scholarly contributions include more than 300 publications in journals including Science, Nature, PNAS, Earth-Science Reviews, and Geophysical Research Letters.

Rosenfeld served as a Lead Author of the chapter 'Water Cycle Changes' in the 6th IPCC Assessment Report and co-chaired the Aerosol-Cloud-Precipitation Climate (ACPC) international initiative. He has received the Friendship Award, E.M.T Award, Kaufman Award, and Verner Suomi Medal.

== Early life and education ==
Rosenfeld completed his academic training at The Hebrew University, earning a B.Sc. in Geology in 1977, followed by an M.Sc. in 1980 and a Ph.D. in 1986 in Atmospheric Sciences, all from the Hebrew University of Jerusalem, with graduate work in cloud microphysics and radar meteorology that later underpinned his research on aerosol cloud precipitation interactions.

== Career ==
Rosenfeld began his career as a teaching assistant at the Hebrew University between 1977 and 1986 and subsequently assumed the position of Postdoctoral Research Fellow at NASA/GSFC, a role he retained until 1988. At The Hebrew University, Rosenfeld held multiple appointments, including as a Lecturer from 1988 to 1991, a Senior Lecturer from 1991 to 1998, an Associate Professor from 1998 to 2001, and a Professor from 2001 to 2020. He has served as an Adjunct Professor at Texas A&M University since 2014, at Nanjing University since 2018, and at Wuhan University since 2020. He has been a Professor Emeritus at The Hebrew University since 2020.

== Research ==
Much of Rosenfeld’s work in this area was carried out through his research group and international collaborations in aerosol cloud precipitation research.

=== Aerosols and precipitation ===
Rosenfeld’s research examines how aerosols affect cloud droplet formation, precipitation efficiency, and climate. His 2000 paper in Science argued that urban and industrial aerosols suppress rain and snow by increasing droplet number and reducing droplet size, delaying precipitation. Later work with V. Ramanathan, Paul Crutzen, Jeffrey Kiehl, and others examined links between aerosols, radiation, and the hydrological cycle, including smoke cloud interactions in the Amazon and reviews of how aerosols can suppress or enhance precipitation depending on conditions.

=== Aerosol convective invigoration and lightning ===
Rosenfeld and his research group formulated and advanced the hypothesis that high concentrations of small aerosol particles can suppress warm rain, retain cloud water aloft, and strengthen some deep convective clouds under suitable conditions. Work from Rosenfeld’s group used aerosol cloud microphysics to explain why lightning is far more common over land than over oceans: continental aerosols delay warm rain and promote electrification, while large sea salt particles over oceans accelerate rain and suppress electrification. A 2022 Nature Communications study found fine aerosols substantially increase lightning density, while coarse sea spray can reduce it by up to about 90 percent.

=== Deep convection and tropical cyclones ===
A 2018 Science paper by Fan, Rosenfeld, and co authors reported that ultrafine aerosols can enhance deep convective clouds and precipitation under some conditions. In tropical cyclones, Rosenfeld’s group argued that aerosols can modify cloud microphysics in ways that suppress hurricane intensity while altering storm size and precipitation distribution.

=== Marine low clouds and cloud-mediated aerosol forcing ===
In satellite based research led by Rosenfeld, aerosol driven droplet concentrations were linked to cloud cover and liquid water in oceanic low level clouds; Rosenfeld’s group has also contributed reviews on the challenges of quantifying cloud-mediated aerosol forcing from space.

=== Weather modification ===
Weather modification and cloud seeding have been recurring themes in Rosenfeld’s research, beginning with his graduate work on Israeli cloud seeding experiments and later field studies of convective cloud seeding elsewhere. His publications address how cloud microstructure affects both the potential magnitude and the detectability of seeding effects. He has also served, since 2024, as principal investigator on a project under the UAE Research Program for Rain Enhancement Science.

International scientific roles

Rosenfeld served as a Lead Author of the Water Cycle Changes chapter in the IPCC’s Sixth Assessment Report, and co chaired the Aerosol Cloud Precipitation Climate initiative, which brought together observational, modelling, and remote sensing research on aerosol cloud precipitation interactions.

== Selected awards and honors ==
- 1988-1991 – Alon Fellowship, Israeli Council for Higher Education
- 2001 – Verner Suomi Medal, American Meteorological Society
- 2001 – Thunderbird Award, Weather Modification Association
- 2003 – Fellow, American Meteorological Society
- 2009 – Friendship Award, People's Government of China
- 2013 – Elected Member, The European Academy of Sciences and Arts
- 2015 – Fellow, American Geophysical Union
- 2018 – The Kaufman Award, American Geophysical Union
- 2024 – Elected Member, Academia Europea
- Clarivate/Web of Science Highly Cited Researcher

== Selected articles ==
- Rosenfeld, D. (2000). Suppression of rain and snow by urban and industriaal air pollution. science, 287(5459), 1793-1796.
- Ramanathan, V. C. P. J., Crutzen, P. J., Kiehl, J. T., & Rosenfeld, D. (2001). Aerosols, climate, and the hydrological cycle. science, 294(5549), 2119-2124.
- Andreae, M. O., Rosenfeld, D., Artaxo, P., Costa, A. A., Frank, G. P., Longo, K. M., & Silva-Dias, M. A. F. D. (2004). Smoking rain clouds over the Amazon. science, 303(5662), 1337-1342.
- Rosenfeld, D., Lohmann, U., Raga, G. B., O'Dowd, C. D., Kulmala, M., Fuzzi, S., ... & Andreae, M. O. (2008). Flood or drought: how do aerosols affect precipitation?. science, 321(5894), 1309-1313.
- Andreae, M. O., & Rosenfeld, D. J. E. S. R. (2008). Aerosol–cloud–precipitation interactions. Part 1. The nature and sources of cloud-active aerosols. Earth-Science Reviews, 89(1-2), 13-41.
- Fan, J., Rosenfeld, D., Zhang, Y., Giangrande, S. E., Li, Z., Machado, L. A., ... & de Souza, R. A. (2018). Substantial convection and precipitation enhancements by ultrafine aerosol particles. Science, 359(6374), 411-418.
- Rosenfeld, D., Zhu, Y., Wang, M., Zheng, Y., Goren, T., & Yu, S. (2019). Aerosol-driven droplet concentrations dominate coverage and water of oceanic low-level clouds. Science, 363(6427), eaav0566.
- Liu, F., Mao, F., Rosenfeld, D., Pan, Z., Zang, L., Zhu, Y., ... & Gong, W. (2022). Opposing comparable large effects of fine aerosols and coarse sea spray on marine warm clouds. Communications Earth & Environment, 3(1), 232.
- Pan, Z., Mao, F., Rosenfeld, D., Zhu, Y., Zang, L., Lu, X., ... & Gong, W. (2022). Coarse sea spray inhibits lightning. Nature Communications, 13(1), 4289.
- Rosenfeld, D., Kokhanovsky, A., Goren, T., Gryspeerdt, E., Hasekamp, O., Jia, H., ... & Sourdeval, O. (2023). Frontiers in satellite‐based estimates of cloud‐mediated aerosol forcing. Reviews of Geophysics, 61(4), e2022RG000799.
- Yin, J., Pan, Z., Mao, F., Rosenfeld, D., Zang, L., Chen, J., & Gong, J. (2024). Large effects of fine and coarse aerosols on tropical deep convective systems throughout their lifecycle. npj Climate and Atmospheric Science, 7(1), 195.
