= Lyctocoris canadensis =

Scientific classification
- Domain: Eukaryota
- Kingdom: Animalia
- Phylum: Arthropoda
- Class: Insecta
- Order: Hemiptera
- Suborder: Heteroptera
- Family: Lyctocoridae
- Genus: Lyctocoris
- Species: L. canadensis

Binomial name
- Lyctocoris canadensis Kelton, 1967

Species of true bug

Lyctocoris canadensis is a species of true bug in the family Lyctocoridae. It is found in North America.
