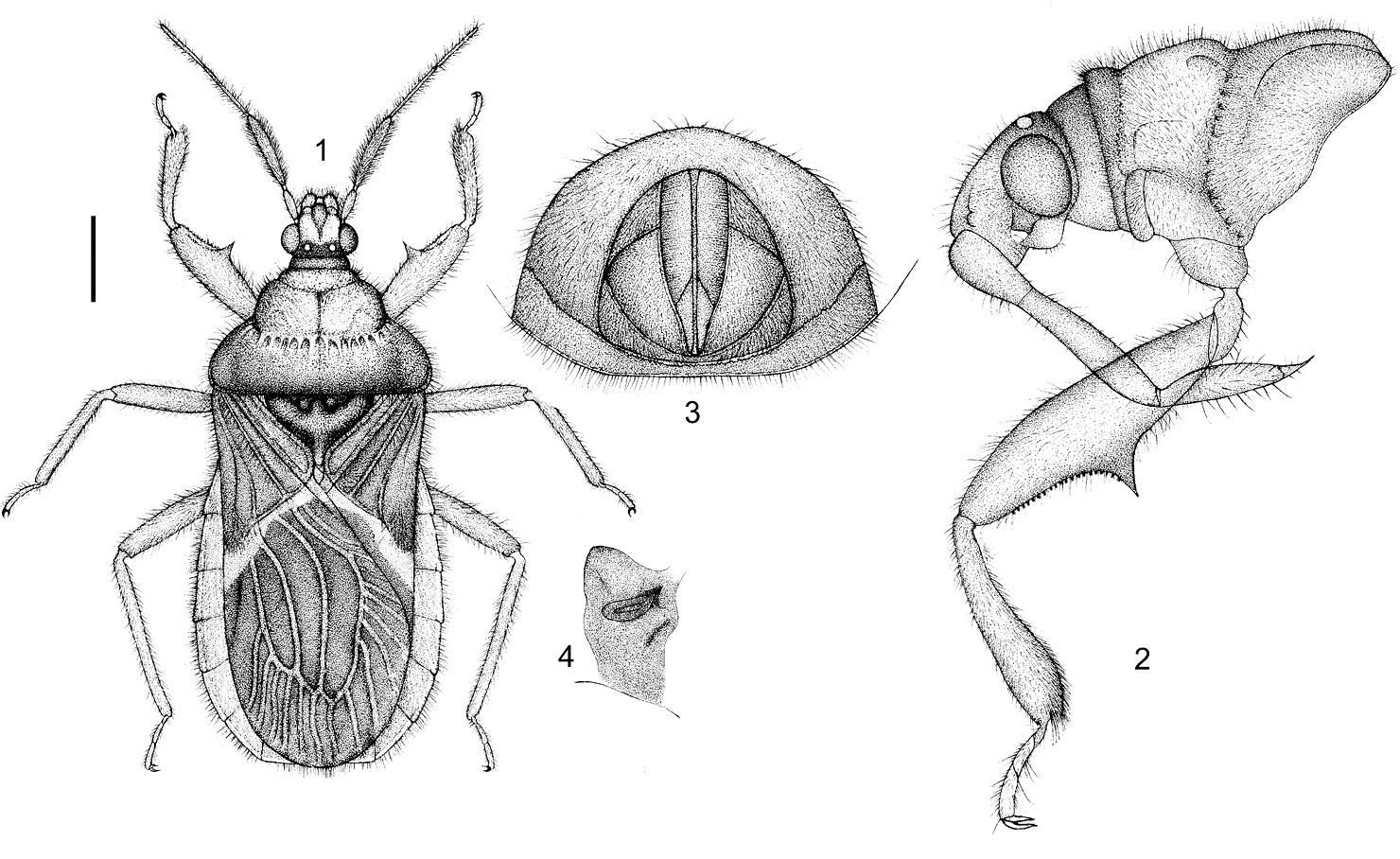
- Rhamphocoris guizhouensis, female holotype

Scientific classification
- Domain: Eukaryota
- Kingdom: Animalia
- Phylum: Arthropoda
- Class: Insecta
- Order: Hemiptera
- Suborder: Heteroptera
- Infraorder: Cimicomorpha
- Family: Nabidae
- Subfamily: Prostemmatinae
- Genus: Rhamphocoris; Kirkaldy, 1901

= Rhamphocoris =

Genus of true bugs

Rhamphocoris is an Asian and Australian genus of bugs in the family Nabidae, subfamily Prostemmatinae and tribe Phorticini.

== Species ==
Known species include:

- Rhamphocoris borneensis (Schumacher, 1914)
- Rhamphocoris dorothea Kirkaldy, 1901 - type species
- Rhamphocoris elegantulus (Schumacher, 1914)
- Rhamphocoris guizhouensis Zhao, Mao & Cao, 2019
- Rhamphocoris hasegawai (Ishihara, 1943)
- Rhamphocoris humeralis
- Rhamphocoris linnavuorii Cassis, 2016
- Rhamphocoris monteithi Cassis, 2016
- Rhamphocoris poppiusi
- Rhamphocoris pulcher (Reuter & Poppius, 1909)
- Rhamphocoris reuteri
- Rhamphocoris rubroniger Kerzhner, 1990
- Rhamphocoris sejunctus Cassis, 2016
- Rhamphocoris tenebrosus Cassis, 2016
- Rhamphocoris tibialis Hsiao, 1981

== Note ==
This genus may be confused with the monotypic bird genus Ramphocoris containing Ramphocoris clotbey.
