= Myrmedobia exilis =

Scientific classification
- Domain: Eukaryota
- Kingdom: Animalia
- Phylum: Arthropoda
- Class: Insecta
- Order: Hemiptera
- Suborder: Heteroptera
- Family: Microphysidae
- Genus: Myrmedobia
- Species: M. exilis

Binomial name
- Myrmedobia exilis (Fallén, 1807)

Species of true bug

Myrmedobia exilis is a species of minute bladder bug in the family Microphysidae. It is found in Europe and Northern Asia (excluding China) and North America.
