= Myrmedobia =

Scientific classification
- Kingdom: Animalia
- Phylum: Arthropoda
- Clade: Pancrustacea
- Class: Insecta
- Order: Hemiptera
- Suborder: Heteroptera
- Family: Microphysidae
- Genus: Myrmedobia; Baerensprung, 1857

Genus of true bugs

Myrmedobia is a genus of minute bladder bugs in the family Microphysidae. There are about five described species in Myrmedobia.

== Species ==
These five species belong to the genus Myrmedobia:

- Myrmedobia coleoptrata (Fallén, 1807)
- Myrmedobia distinguenda Reuter, 1884
- Myrmedobia exilis (Fallén, 1807)
- Myrmedobia inconspicua (Douglas & Scott, 1871)
- † Loricula pericarti Popov, 2004
