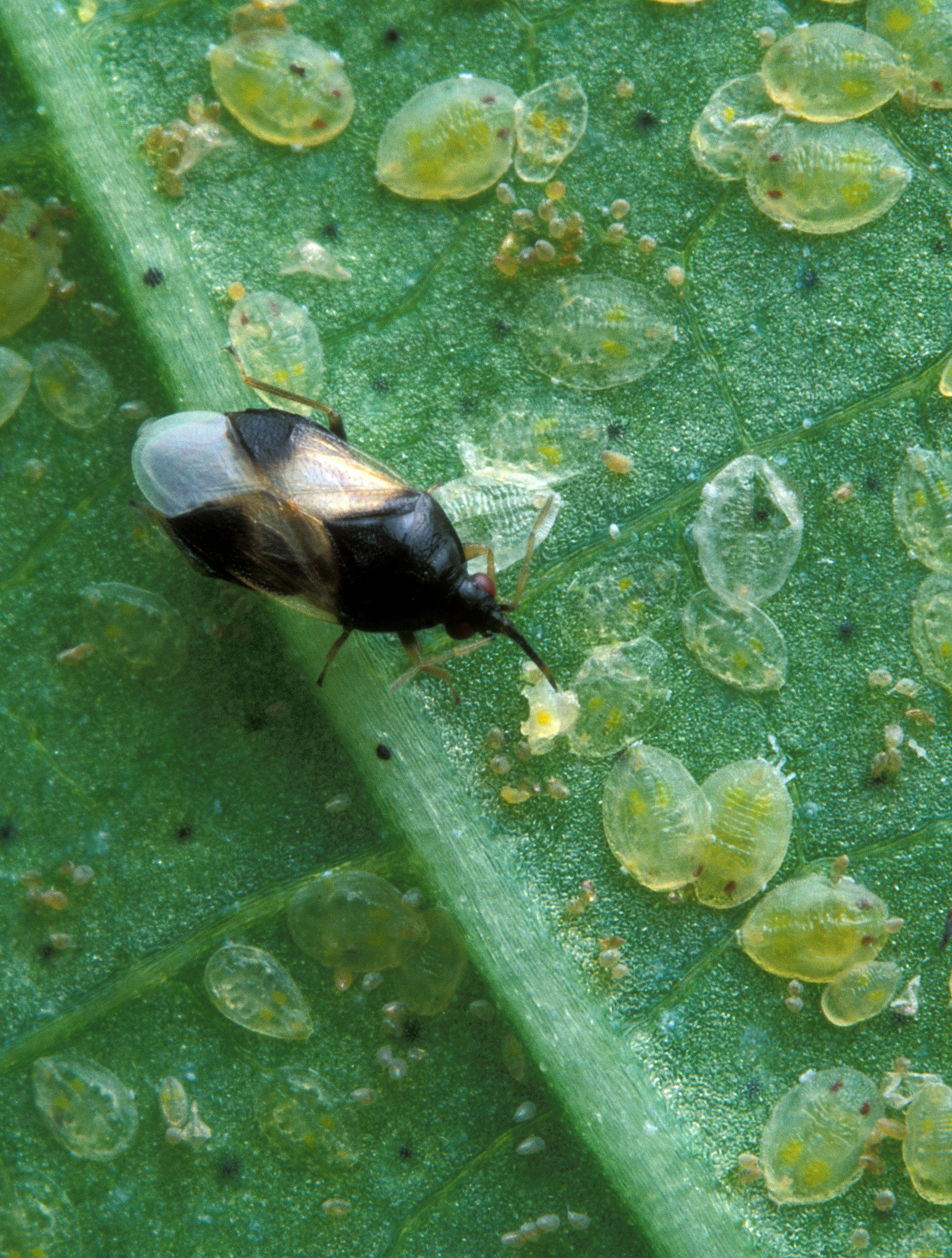
- Orius insidiosus

Scientific classification
- Kingdom: Animalia
- Phylum: Arthropoda
- Clade: Pancrustacea
- Class: Insecta
- Order: Hemiptera
- Suborder: Heteroptera
- Infraorder: Cimicomorpha
- Superfamily: Cimicoidea; Jordan (1912) and Ferris & Usinger (1939)

Families
- Anthocoridae; Cimicidae; Curaliidae; Lasiochilidae; Lyctocoridae; Plokiophilidae; Polyctenidae

= Cimicoidea =

Superfamily of true bugs

Cimicoidea is a superfamily of insects belonging to the infraorder Cimicomorpha, including bedbugs and related families.
