= Alloeorhynchus trimacula =

Scientific classification
- Domain: Eukaryota
- Kingdom: Animalia
- Phylum: Arthropoda
- Class: Insecta
- Order: Hemiptera
- Suborder: Heteroptera
- Family: Nabidae
- Genus: Alloeorhynchus
- Species: A. trimacula

Binomial name
- Alloeorhynchus trimacula (Stein, 1857)

Species of true bug

Alloeorhynchus trimacula is a species of damsel bug in the family Nabidae. It is found in Central America and North America.
