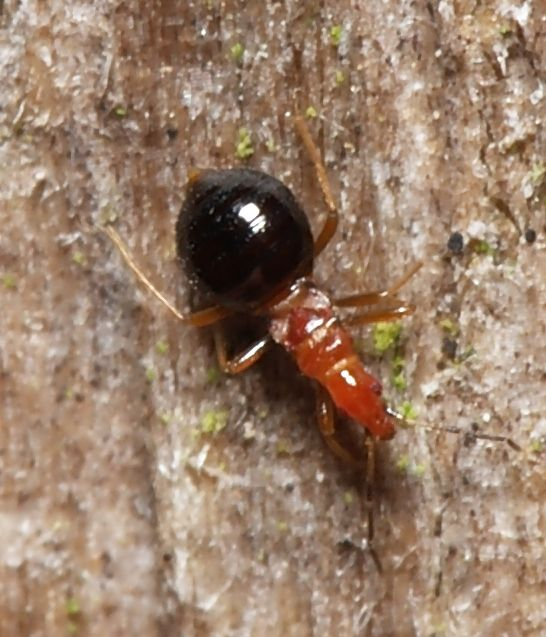
- female L. elegantula from Germany

Scientific classification
- Kingdom: Animalia
- Phylum: Arthropoda
- Clade: Pancrustacea
- Class: Insecta
- Order: Hemiptera
- Suborder: Heteroptera
- Family: Microphysidae
- Genus: Loricula; Curtis, 1833

= Loricula =

Genus of true bugs

Loricula is a genus of minute bladder bugs in the family Microphysidae. There are more than 20 described species in Loricula.

== Species ==
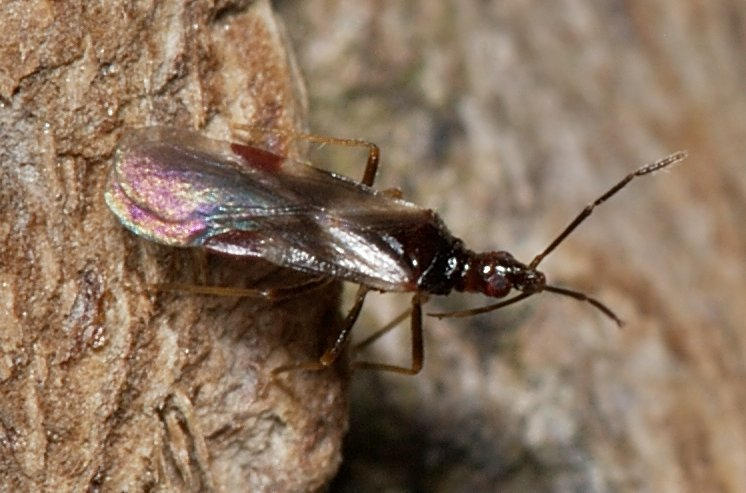
male L. elegantula from Germany

These 25 species belong to the genus Loricula:

- Loricula bedeli (Montandon, 1887)
- Loricula bipunctata (Perris, 1857)
- Loricula blascoi Ribes & Pericart, 1996
- Loricula distinguenda Reuter, 1884
- Loricula elegantula (Bärensprung, 1858)
- Loricula freyi (Lindberg, 1932)
- Loricula hispanica Pericart, 1972
- Loricula jakovlevi Pericart, 1969
- Loricula josifovi Simov, 2008
- Loricula lundbladi China, 1938
- Loricula meinanderi Pericart, 1972
- Loricula pselaphiformis Curtis, 1833
- Loricula ruficeps (Reuter, 1884)
- Loricula rufoscutellata (Baerensprung, 1857)
- Loricula spec Dames, 1885
- Loricula stenocephala Ribes, 1985
- † Loricula ablusa Popov, 2006
- † Loricula ceranowiczae Popov, 2004
- † Loricula damzeni Popov, 2004
- † Loricula finitima Popov, 2006
- † Loricula heissi Popov, 2006
- † Loricula ocellata Popov, 2006
- † Loricula perkovskyi (Putshkov & Popov, 2003)
- † Loricula polonica Popov & Herczek, 2008
- † Loricula samlandi Popov, 2006
