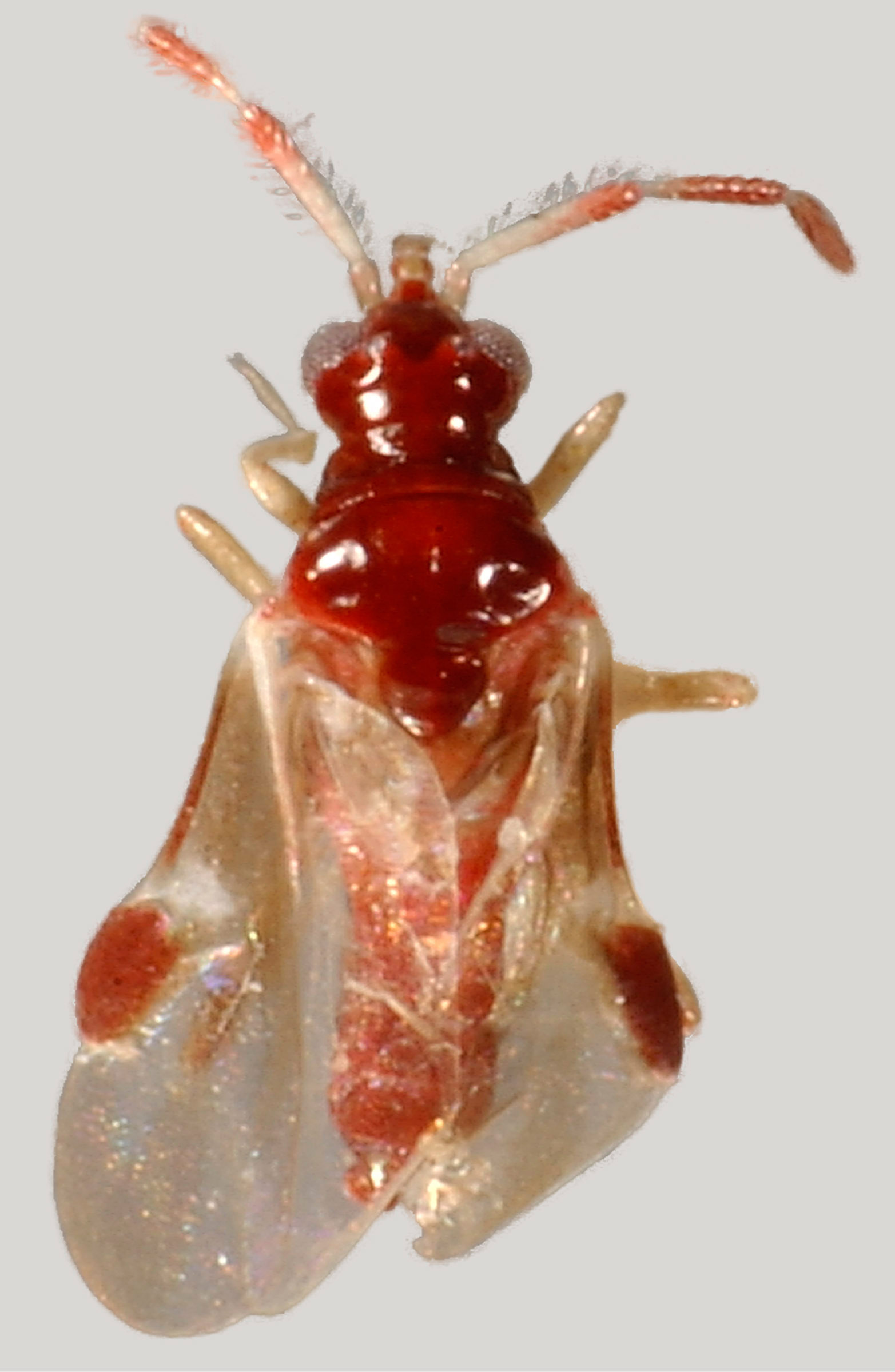

Scientific classification
- Kingdom: Animalia
- Phylum: Arthropoda
- Clade: Pancrustacea
- Class: Insecta
- Order: Hemiptera
- Suborder: Heteroptera
- Infraorder: Cimicomorpha
- Superfamily: Cimicoidea
- Family: Curaliidae; Schuh, Weirauch & Henry, 2008
- Genus: Curalium; Schuh, Weirauch & Henry, 2008
- Species: C. cronini

Binomial name
- Curalium cronini Schuh, Weirauch & Henry, 2008

= Curalium =

Genus of true bugs

Curalium is a genus of true bug that is the sole member of the insect family Curaliidae. Curalium contains a single species, Curalium cronini.

Specimens of Curalium cronini have been found in northern Florida and Louisiana, in the southeast United States, from 1997 to 2007. Its physical and genetic characteristics are sufficiently different from related species to merit its placement into a new genus, Curalium, and a new family, Curaliidae.

The males of Curalium cronini are very small bugs, about 1.5 mm in length, with a red body. No females are known to have been discovered.
