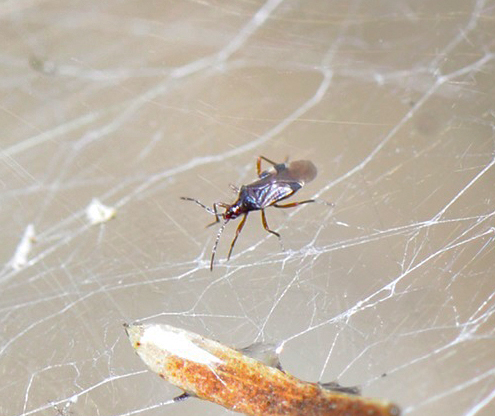
- Plokiophiloides bannaensis

Scientific classification
- Domain: Eukaryota
- Kingdom: Animalia
- Phylum: Arthropoda
- Class: Insecta
- Order: Hemiptera
- Suborder: Heteroptera
- Infraorder: Cimicomorpha
- Superfamily: Cimicoidea
- Family: Plokiophilidae; China, 1953

= Plokiophilidae =

Plokiophilidae Temporal range: Eocene–present

Family of true bugs

The Plokiophilidae or web-lovers are a small group of insects belonging to the true bugs (Heteroptera). Nine genera (one fossil, from Baltic amber) and 20 species are currently known.

== Morphology ==
Plokiophilidae are small (1.2-3.0 mm length) and vaguely similar to Anthocoridae.

== Life history ==
Plokiophilidae inhabit almost exclusively spider webs of spiders from the suborder Mygalomorphae or Araneomorphae, or the webs of Embioptera.

The genera Plokiophila, Plokiophiloides, Lipokophila and Embiophila are known to copulate through traumatic insemination.

== Distribution ==
Plokiophilidae are mostly documented from the New World tropics and tropical Africa. The genera Heissophila and the species Paraplokiophiloides schwendingeri have been described from Thailand. Monteithophila queenslandana, described in 2015, is the first species known from Australia, while Monteithophila fijiensis has been found in Fiji.

== Palaeobiology ==
The first fossil plokiophilid species, Pavlostysia wunderlichi, was identified in 2006 and then described in 2008 from fossils in Eocene Baltic amber; a Cretaceous fossil has also been identified.
