= Xylastodoris =

Scientific classification
- Kingdom: Animalia
- Phylum: Arthropoda
- Clade: Pancrustacea
- Class: Insecta
- Order: Hemiptera
- Suborder: Heteroptera
- Family: Thaumastocoridae
- Genus: Xylastodoris; Barber, 1920

Genus of true bugs

Xylastodoris, also known as the royal palm bug, is a genus of true bugs in the family Thaumastocoridae. It is a monotypic genus containing a single species, Xylastodoris luteolus. It occurs only on one palm species called Roystonea regia.
