= Alloeorhynchus nigrolobus =

Scientific classification
- Domain: Eukaryota
- Kingdom: Animalia
- Phylum: Arthropoda
- Class: Insecta
- Order: Hemiptera
- Suborder: Heteroptera
- Family: Nabidae
- Genus: Alloeorhynchus
- Species: A. nigrolobus

Binomial name
- Alloeorhynchus nigrolobus Barber, 1922

Species of true bug

Alloeorhynchus nigrolobus is a species of damsel bugs in the family Nabidae. It is found in North America.
