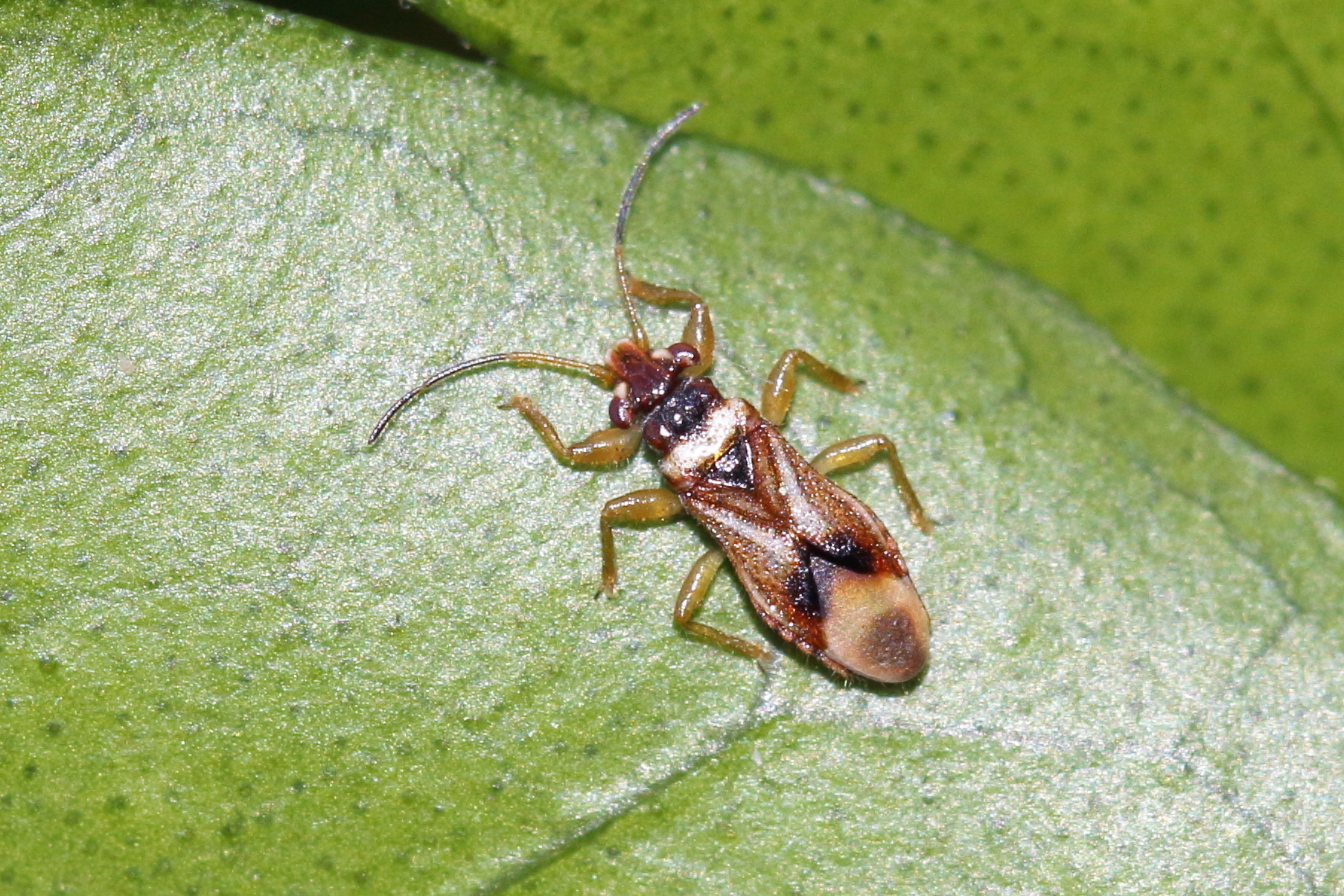

Scientific classification
- Kingdom: Animalia
- Phylum: Arthropoda
- Clade: Pancrustacea
- Class: Insecta
- Order: Hemiptera
- Suborder: Heteroptera
- Infraorder: Cimicomorpha
- Superfamily: Miroidea
- Family: Thaumastocoridae; Kirkaldy, 1908

= Thaumastocoridae =

Family of true bugs

Thaumastocoridae is a family of true bugs in the order Hemiptera. There are about 9 genera and more than 20 described species in the family Thaumastocoridae.

== Genera ==
- Baclozygum Bergroth, 1909
- Discocoris Kormilev, 1955
- Onymocoris Drake & Slater, 1957
- Proxylastodoris Heiss & Popov, 2002
- Thaicoris Kormilev, 1969
- Thaumastocoris Kirkaldy, 1908
- Xylastodoris Barber, 1920
- †Paleodoris Poinar & Santiago-Blay, 1997 Dominican amber, Miocene
- †Protodoris Nel, Waller & De Ploëg, 2004 Oise amber, France, Ypresian
- †Thaumastotingis Heiss & Golub, 2015 Baltic amber, Eocene
