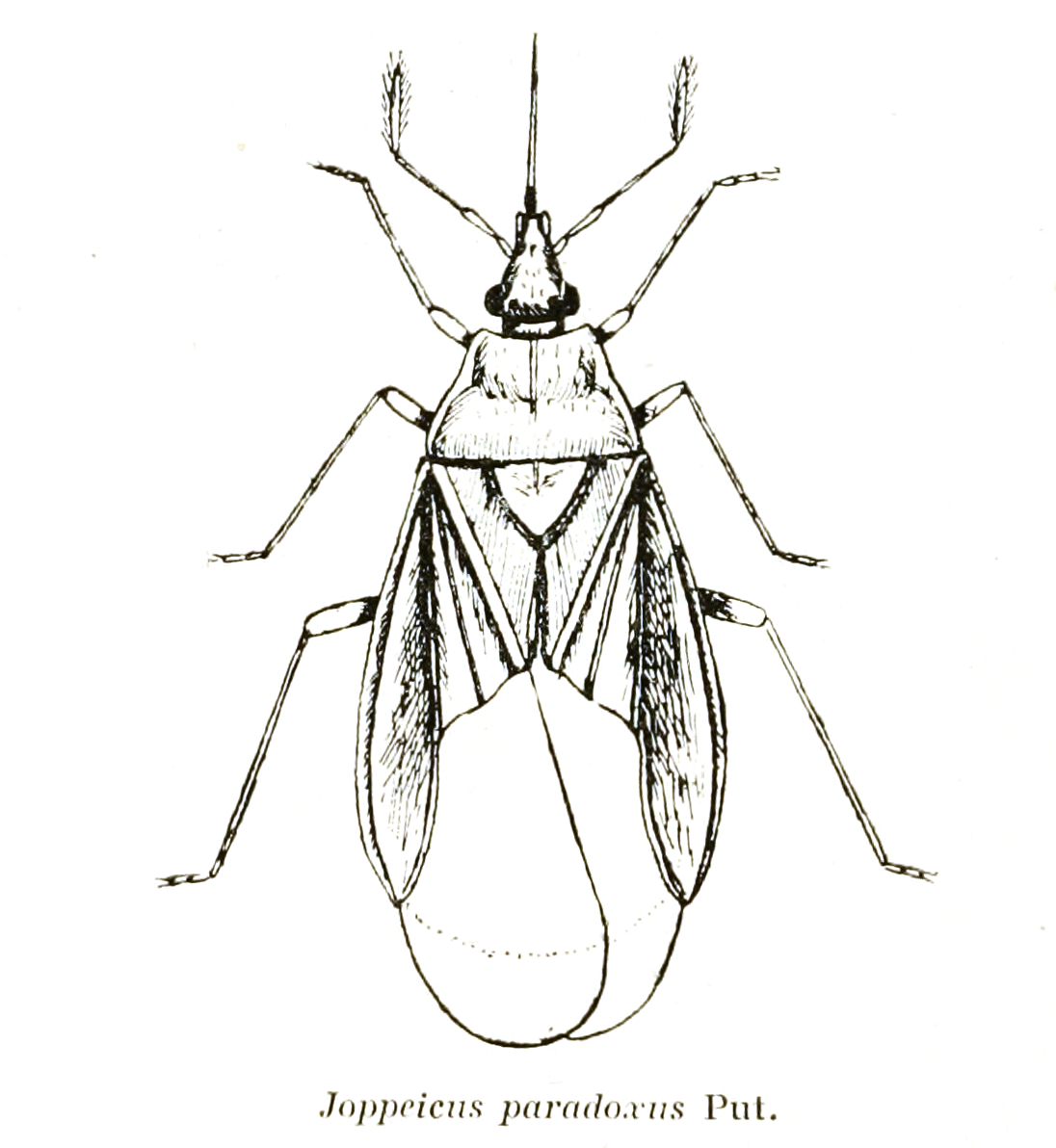

Scientific classification
- Kingdom: Animalia
- Phylum: Arthropoda
- Class: Insecta
- Order: Hemiptera
- Suborder: Heteroptera
- Infraorder: Cimicomorpha
- Family: Joppeicidae; Reuter, 1910
- Genus: Joppeicus; Putton, 1881
- Species: J. paradoxus

Binomial name
- Joppeicus paradoxus Puton, 1881

= Joppeicus =

Species of true bug

Joppeicus paradoxus is a predatory heteropteran bug and the only member of the genus Joppeicus and the family Joppeicidae. Adults are ~3 mm long.

== Taxonomy ==
The species was described in 1881 and was initially placed in the Aradidae, later moved to the Lygaeidae (by Bergroth in 1898). In 1954 it was moved to the Cimicomorpha and the family was erected in 1910. The features of the group are a median longitudinal carina on the pronotum and the forewing venation. A molecular genetics study in 2022 recovered Joppeicidae within Cimicomorpha as the closest relative of family Microphysidae, forming together the clade Microphysoidea. Another study in 2023 recovered Joppeicidae as the earliest diverging group of Cimiciformes.

== Ecology ==
Joppeicus paradoxus has been described as living in «gardens, fields, planted woods, street alleys» along the Nile River and also caves, rock crevices of the nearby desert or semidesert regions. It can be found under bark, herbs, leaf litter, stones, litter, or even among mammalian feces and burrows of the rodent genus Meriones.

It feeds on a variety of small arthropods, such as coleopteran larvae and adults, ants, other heteropterans, spiders and ticks.

== Behaviour ==
It is quite active, runs quickly and tends to avoid light during the day.

== Distribution ==
The species is known natively from northeast Africa and the eastern part of the Mediterranean. It has been originally described from Jaffa and documented from Israel and in Egypt and Sudan along the Nile and Ethiopia. It has recently been found in Fuerteventura and Socotra and even in a bean storage area in Thailand.

== Importance to humans ==
Joppeicus paradoxus has been investigated as a potential biocontrol insect against insect pests affecting food storage, such as Tribolium confusum.
