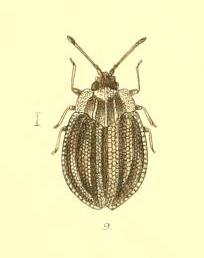
- Acalypta nigrina

Scientific classification
- Kingdom: Animalia
- Phylum: Arthropoda
- Clade: Pancrustacea
- Class: Insecta
- Order: Hemiptera
- Suborder: Heteroptera
- Infraorder: Cimicomorpha
- Superfamily: Miroidea

= Miroidea =

Superfamily of true bugs

Miroidea is a superfamily of true bugs in the order Hemiptera. There are about 7 families and more than 15,000 described species in Miroidea.

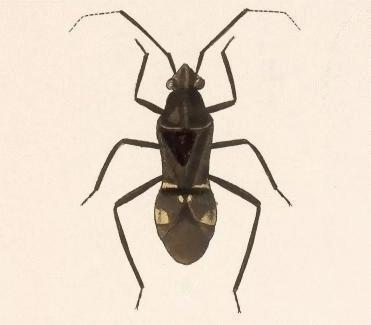
Zosippus inhonestus

== Families ==
These seven families belong to the superfamily Miroidea:

- Microphysidae Dohrn, 1859
- Miridae (plant bugs)
- Thaumastocoridae Kirkaldy, 1908
- Tingidae (lace bugs)
- † Berstidae Tihelka et al., 2020
- † Ebboidae Perrichot et al., 2006
- † Hispanocaderidae Golub and Popov, 2012
- † Ignotingidae Zhang et al., 2005
