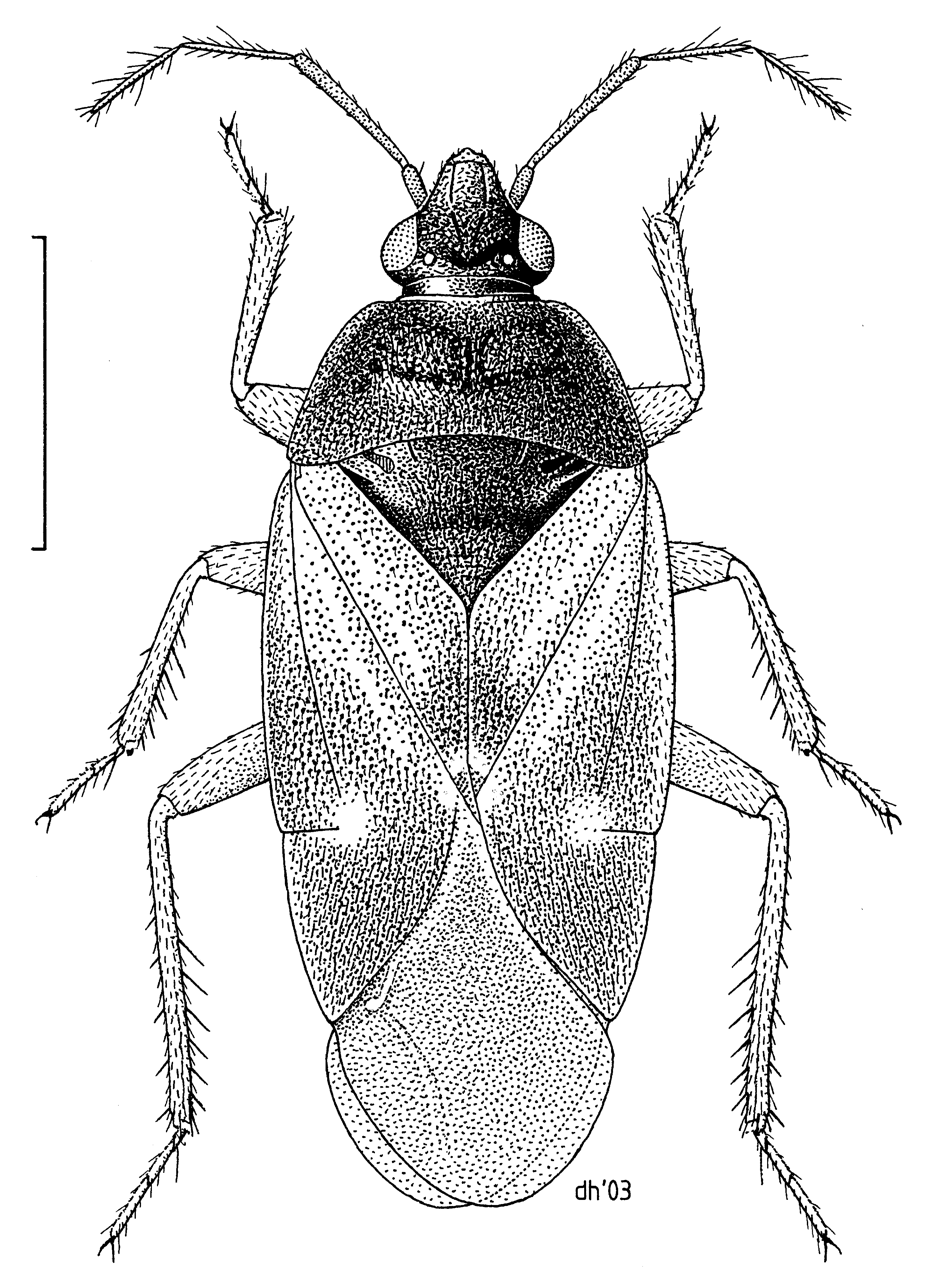
- Lyctocoris campestris

Scientific classification
- Domain: Eukaryota
- Kingdom: Animalia
- Phylum: Arthropoda
- Class: Insecta
- Order: Hemiptera
- Suborder: Heteroptera
- Family: Lyctocoridae
- Genus: Lyctocoris
- Species: L. campestris

Binomial name
- Lyctocoris campestris (Fabricius, 1794)

= Lyctocoris campestris =

Species of true bug

Lyctocoris campestris is a species of true bug in the family Lyctocoridae. It is found in Europe and Northern Asia (excluding China), Central America, North America, Oceania, and Antarctica.
