= Pag-asa =

Pag-asa is a Tagalog language word meaning "hope". It may refer to:

- PAGASA, Philippine Atmospheric, Geophysical, and Astronomical Services Administration
- Pag-asa, Bohol, one of the 44 barangays of the municipality of Ubay, in the Philippines province of Bohol
- Pag-asa (eagle), the name given to the first of the breed "Philippine eagle" to be bred and hatched in captivity
- Pag-asa, the Philippine name of Thitu Island, one of the Spratly Islands in the South China Sea

== See also ==
- Pagasa (disambiguation)
