= Mallochiola =

Scientific classification
- Kingdom: Animalia
- Phylum: Arthropoda
- Clade: Pancrustacea
- Class: Insecta
- Order: Hemiptera
- Suborder: Heteroptera
- Family: Microphysidae
- Genus: Mallochiola; Bergroth, 1925
- Species: M. gagates

Binomial name
- Mallochiola gagates (Mcatee & Malloch, 1924)

Synonyms
- Ankylotylus Knight, 1968

Genus of true bugs

Mallochiola is a genus of small bladder bugs in the family Microphysidae. There is one described species in Mallochiola, M. gagates.
