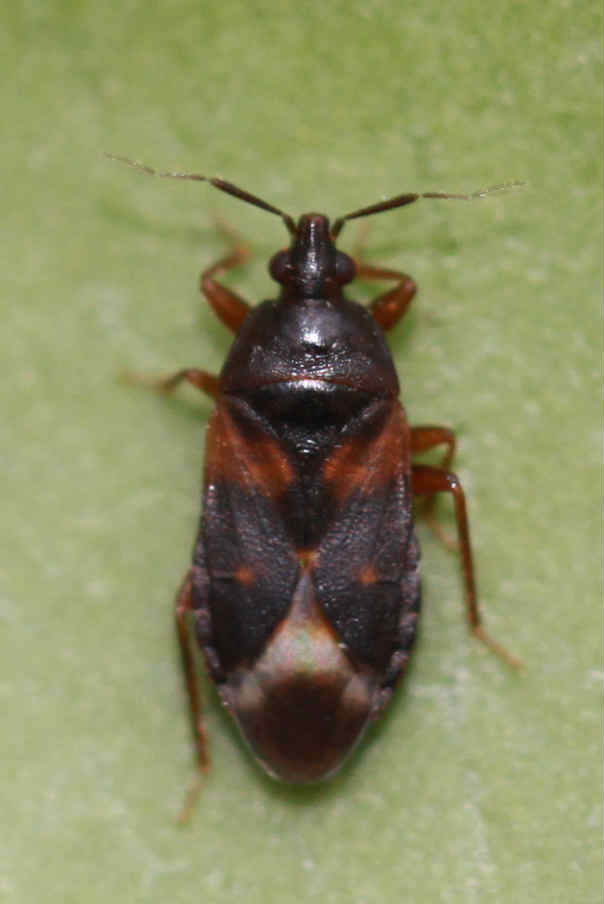
- Lyctocoris dimidiatus

Scientific classification
- Kingdom: Animalia
- Phylum: Arthropoda
- Clade: Pancrustacea
- Class: Insecta
- Order: Hemiptera
- Suborder: Heteroptera
- Family: Lyctocoridae
- Genus: Lyctocoris; Hahn, 1836

Subgenera
- Lyctocoris (Dolichomerium) Kirkaldy, 1900; Lyctocoris (Lyctocoris) Hahn, 1836

= Lyctocoris =

Genus of true bugs

Lyctocoris is a genus of true bugs in the family Lyctocoridae. There are about 15 described species in Lyctocoris.

== Species ==
These 15 species belong to the genus Lyctocoris:

- Lyctocoris campestris (Fabricius, 1794)
- Lyctocoris canadensis Kelton, 1967
- Lyctocoris dimidiatus (Spinola, 1837)
- Lyctocoris doris Van Duzee, 1921
- Lyctocoris elongatus (Reuter, 1871)
- Lyctocoris hasegawai Hiura, 1966
- Lyctocoris hawaiiensis (Kirkaldy, 1902)
- Lyctocoris ichikawai Yamada & Yasunaga
- Lyctocoris menieri Carayon, 1971
- Lyctocoris nidicola Wagner, 1955
- Lyctocoris okanaganus Kelton & Anderson, 1962
- Lyctocoris rostratus Kelton & Anderson, 1962
- Lyctocoris stalii (Reuter, 1871)
- Lyctocoris tuberosus Kelton & Anderson, 1962
- Lyctocoris uyttenboogaarti Blote, 1929
