= Pagasa fusca =

Scientific classification
- Domain: Eukaryota
- Kingdom: Animalia
- Phylum: Arthropoda
- Class: Insecta
- Order: Hemiptera
- Suborder: Heteroptera
- Family: Nabidae
- Genus: Pagasa
- Species: P. fusca

Binomial name
- Pagasa fusca (Stein, 1857)

Species of true bug

Pagasa fusca is a species of damsel bug in the family Nabidae. It is found in Central America, North America, and South America.

== Subspecies ==
These two subspecies belong to the species Pagasa fusca:

- Pagasa fusca fusca (Stein, 1857)
- Pagasa fusca nigripes Harris, 1926
