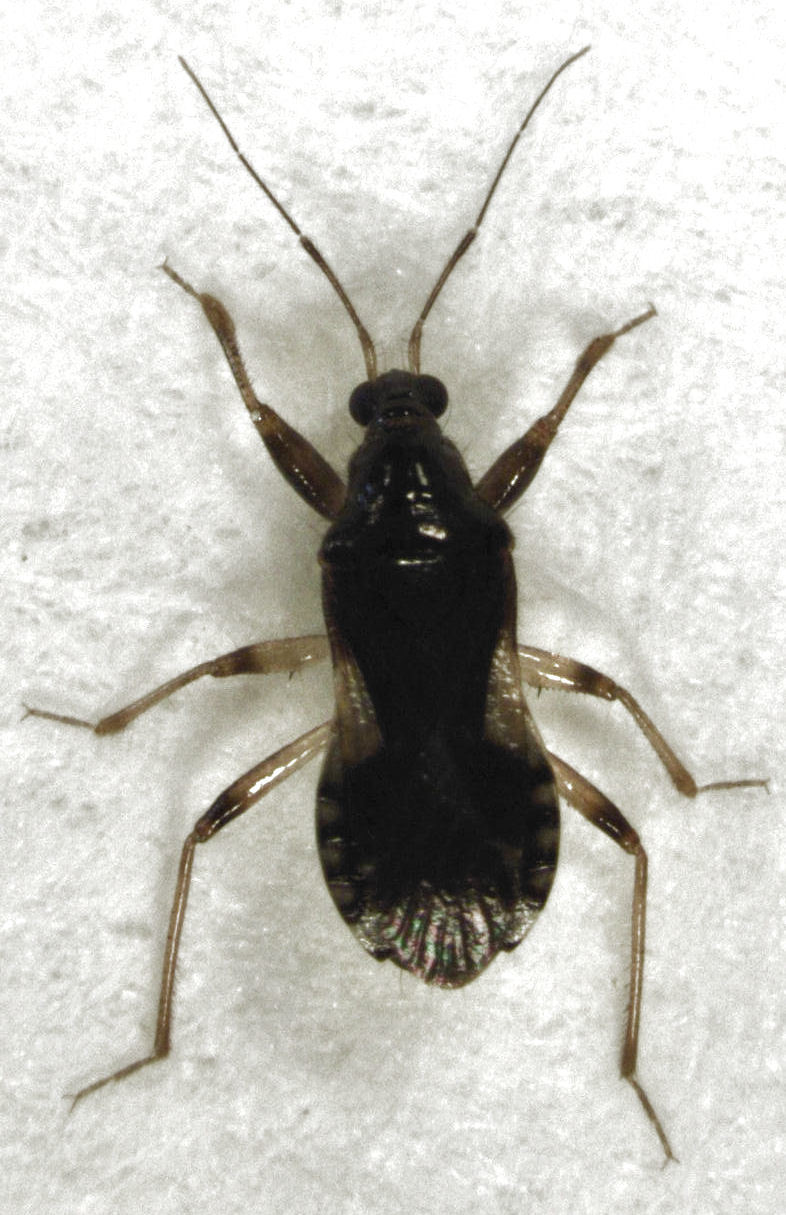
- Alloeorhynchus myersi - Adult

Scientific classification
- Domain: Eukaryota
- Kingdom: Animalia
- Phylum: Arthropoda
- Class: Insecta
- Order: Hemiptera
- Suborder: Heteroptera
- Family: Nabidae
- Subfamily: Prostemmatinae
- Genus: Alloeorhynchus; Fieber, 1860

= Alloeorhynchus =

Genus of true bugs

Alloeorhynchus is a genus of damsel bugs in the family Nabidae. There are at least four described species in the genus Alloeorhynchus.

== Species ==
- Alloeorhynchus flavipes (Fieber, 1836)
- Alloeorhynchus maculosus Kerzhner, 1992
- Alloeorhynchus nigrolobus Barber, 1922
- Alloeorhynchus trimacula (Stein, 1857)
