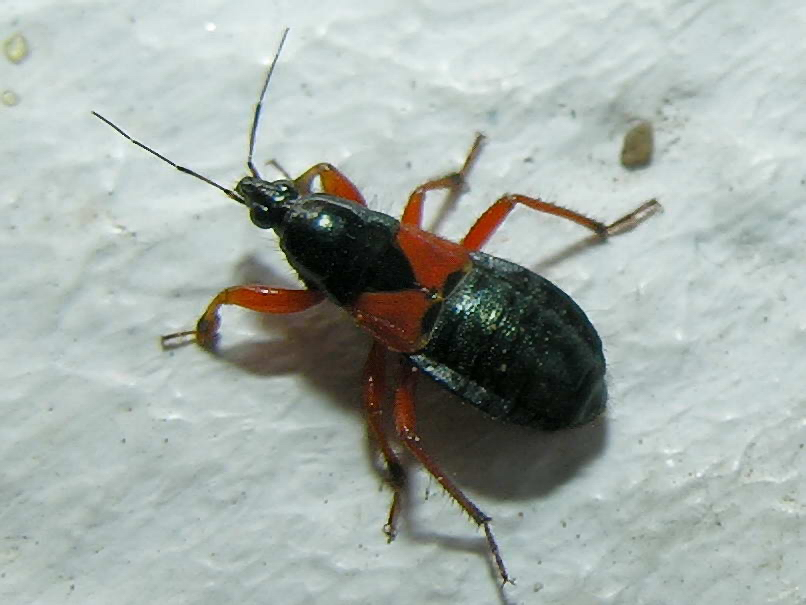
- Prostemma guttula

Scientific classification
- Kingdom: Animalia
- Phylum: Arthropoda
- Class: Insecta
- Order: Hemiptera
- Suborder: Heteroptera
- Family: Nabidae
- Subfamily: Prostemmatinae

= Prostemmatinae =

Subfamily of true bugs

Prostemmatinae is a subfamily of damsel bugs in the family Nabidae.

In America, there are at least 13 described species in Prostemmatinae.

== Genera ==
There are two tribes:

=== Phorticini ===
- Phorticus Stål, 1860
- Rhamphocoris Kirkaldy, 1901

=== Prostemmatini ===
- Alloeorhynchus Fieber, 1860
- Pagasa Stål, 1862
- Prostemma Laporte, 1832
