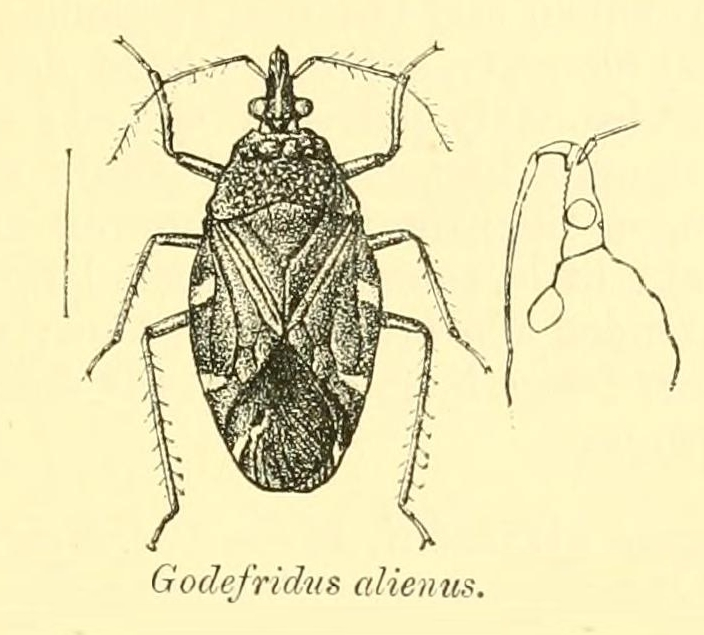
- Scotomedes alienus

Scientific classification
- Kingdom: Animalia
- Phylum: Arthropoda
- Class: Insecta
- Order: Hemiptera
- Suborder: Heteroptera
- Infraorder: Cimicomorpha
- Family: Velocipedidae; Bergroth, 1891

Genera
- Scotomedes Stål, 1873; Bloeteomedes van Doesburg, 1970; Costomedes van Doesburg, 2004

= Velocipedidae =

Family of insects

Velocipedidae is a family of bugs with three genera and about 30 species in the Indomalayan and Australasian realms. Their behaviour and biology are largely unknown but are known from decaying and fallen wood or on the forest floor close to water. They are active runners and fliers, thought to be predators. Their bodies are often covered in phoretic mites. Many specimens have been taken at lights. Some fossil species have been assigned to the family.

== Description and systematics ==
Adult Velocipedidae are 10 to 15 mm long and have an elongate, forward facing head and a broadened exocorium (the margin of the forewings) giving them a very oval outline. The head is elongated and with neck-space of nearly the diameter of the eye. The pronotum, scutellum, corium and clavus are strongly covered in punctures. They have ocelli. The membrane of the wing has three closed cells with simple or forked veins emerging from them. The legs are modified for fast running, the femora and tibia are elongated.

The fossil Aphrastomedes anthocoroides described from Burmese amber has been placed in this family.

=== Genera and species ===
- Scotomedes Stål, 1873 - Oriental region
  - S. alienus (Distant, 1904) - India, Nepal
  - S. ater Stål, 1873
  - S. doesburgi
  - S. guangxiensis
  - S. yunnanensis
  - S. formosanus Doesburg & Ishikawa, 2008 - Taiwan
  - S. biguttulata
  - S. distanti
  - S. gedehensis
  - S. huangi
  - S. lemoulti
  - S. maai
  - S. minor
  - S. polis
  - S. priscus
  - S. rudolfi
  - S. sumatrensis
  - S. thai
- Bloeteomedes van Doesburg, 1970 - Oriental region
  - B. borneensis
  - B. sarawakensis
- Costomedes van Doesburg, 2004 - Australasian region
  - C. cheesmanae - New Guinea
  - C. fakfakensis - New Guinea
  - C. gazelle - New Britain, Bismarck Archipelago
  - C. gressitti - New Guinea
  - C. heissi - Ceram
  - C. hirsutus - New Guinea
  - C. karimui - New Guinea
  - C. morobensis - New Guinea
  - C. sedlaceki - New Guinea
  - C. solomonensis - Solomon Islands
  - C. toxopeusi - New Guinea
