= Pagasa (bug) =

Scientific classification
- Kingdom: Animalia
- Phylum: Arthropoda
- Clade: Pancrustacea
- Class: Insecta
- Order: Hemiptera
- Suborder: Heteroptera
- Family: Nabidae
- Subfamily: Prostemmatinae
- Genus: Pagasa; Stål, 1862

Genus of true bugs

Pagasa is a genus of damsel bugs in the family Nabidae. There are about 11 described species in Pagasa.

== Species ==
These 11 species belong to the genus Pagasa:

- Pagasa confusa Kerzhner, 1993^{i c g}
- Pagasa costalis Reuter, 1909^{g}
- Pagasa fasciventris Harris, 1940^{i c g}
- Pagasa fusca (Stein, 1857)^{i c g b}
- Pagasa fuscipennis Reuter, 1909^{g}
- Pagasa insperata Hussey, 1953^{i c g}
- Pagasa luteiceps Walker, 1873^{g}
- Pagasa nigripes^{b}
- Pagasa pallidiceps (Stål, 1860)^{i c g}
- Pagasa pallipes Stål, 1873^{i c g}
- Pagasa signatipennis Reuter, 1909^{g}

Data sources: i = ITIS, c = Catalogue of Life, g = GBIF, b = Bugguide.net
