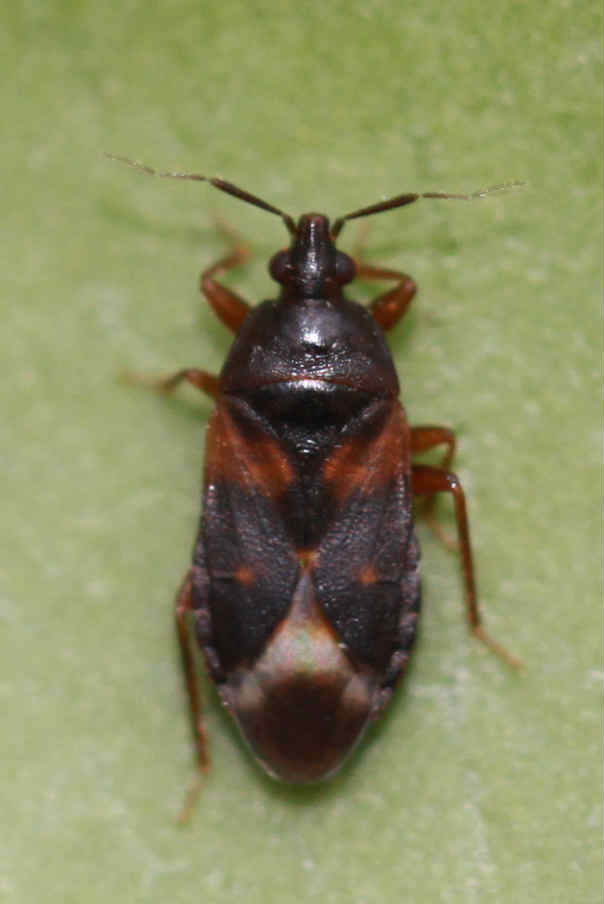
- Lyctocoris dimidiatus

Scientific classification
- Kingdom: Animalia
- Phylum: Arthropoda
- Clade: Pancrustacea
- Class: Insecta
- Order: Hemiptera
- Suborder: Heteroptera
- Superfamily: Cimicoidea
- Family: Lyctocoridae; Reuter, 1884

= Lyctocoridae =

Family of true bugs

Lyctocoridae is a reconstituted family of bugs, formerly classified within the minute pirate bugs of the family Anthocoridae. It is widely distributed, with one species (Lyctocoris campestris), being cosmopolitan.

== Description ==
Lyctocoridae range in length from 2 mm to 6 mm. They have tarsi 3-segmented, forewing with a costal fracture and with weakly developed veins in the membrane, laterotergites on all abdominal terga, and male genitalia strongly asymmetrical (left paramere larger than the right).

Overall they resemble the related family Anthocoridae, but can be distinguished by:

- In males, the left paramere is flat, with a single-sheet form, and without a median sulcus. The phallus is tubular and well visible, with ductus seminis striated transversely and extended apically by a needle-shaped acus.
- In females, there are genital apophyses in the anterior region of abdominal sternum 7.

== Diet ==
Lyctocoridae are mostly predators of small, soft-bodied arthropods, though L. campestris occasionally feeds on mammal (including human) blood and L. ichikawai is only known to feed on sap of sawtooth oak (Quercus acutissima). Adults and nymphs have similar diets.

== Habitat ==
This family of bugs occurs under tree bark and in decaying plant matter, animal nests and burrows, manure piles, poultry houses, granaries and stored food products.

== Reproduction ==
Lyctocoridae practice traumatic insemination in which the male pierces the female (using the acus of his phallus) between terga 7 and 8 on the right side of her abdomen. The male's sperm migrate through the haemocoel or through specialized structures in the female to the ovaries, then fertilise the eggs within the vitellarium.

== Biological control ==
Some species of Lyctocoridae are biological control agents that feed on pest insects. Lyctocoris attack beetle and moth pests in stored food products, and also attack bark beetle pests.

== Systematics ==
Recent phylogenetic work supports the treatment of Lyctocoridae as a family separate from Anthocoridae, but more recent molecular phylogenies indicate that many lineages considered at one point to be constituents are still better placed in Anthocoridae (e.g, Dufouriellini;), leaving only a few genera in Lyctocoridae.

=== Genera ===
BioLib lists a single subfamily Lyctocorinae Reuter, 1884:

1. Lyctocoris Hahn, 1836 (in monotypic tribe Lyctocorini Reuter, 1884)
2. Astemmocoris Carayon & Usinger, 1965

=== Placed in Anthocoridae ===
The following are placed in the Anthocorinae tribes Anthocorini, Dufouriellini, and Scolopini:

- Alofa Herring, 1976
- Amphiareus Distant, 1904
- Brachysteles Mulsant & Rey, 1852
- Buchananiella Reuter, 1884
- Calliodis Reuter, 1871
- Cardiastethus Fieber, 1860
- Dufouriellus Kirkaldy, 1906
- Dysepicritus Reuter, 1885
- Nidicola Harris and Drake, 1941
- Orthosoleniopsis Poppius, 1909
- Physopleurella Reuter, 1884
- Scoloposcelis Fieber, 1864
- Solenonotus Reuter, 1871
- Xylocoridea Reuter, 1876
- Xyloecocoris Reuter, 1879
