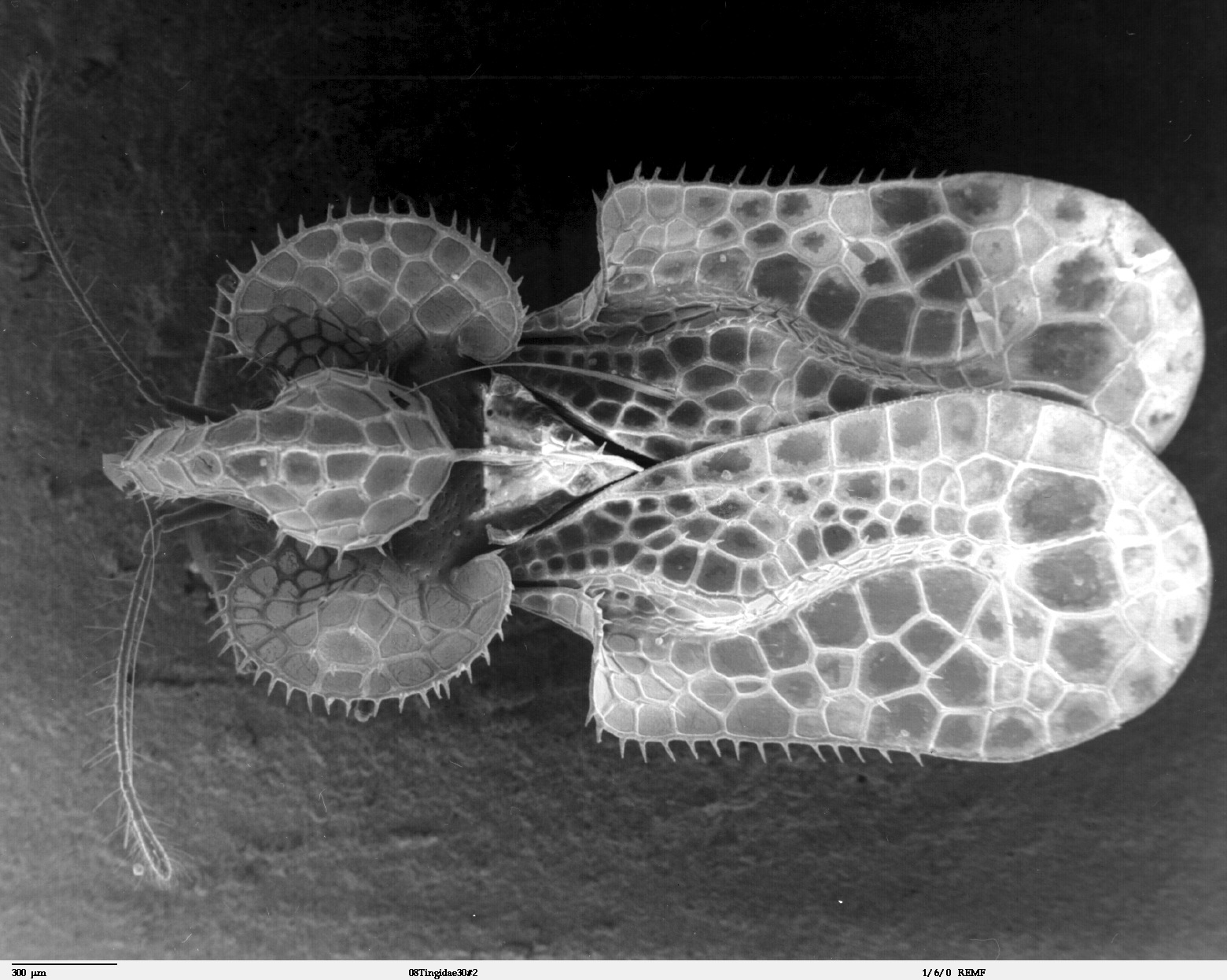
- Scanning electron microscope image of a lace bug (family Tingidae)

Scientific classification
- Kingdom: Animalia
- Phylum: Arthropoda
- Clade: Pancrustacea
- Class: Insecta
- Order: Hemiptera
- Suborder: Heteroptera
- Infraorder: Cimicomorpha; Leston et al. 1954

Families
- see text

= Cimicomorpha =

Assassin bugs, bed bugs, and allies Temporal range: Ladinian–Recent

Order of true bugs

The Cimicomorpha are an infraorder of insects in the order Hemiptera, the true bugs. The rostrum and other morphology of some members apparently are adapted to feeding on animals as their prey or hosts. Members include bed bugs, bat bugs, assassin bugs, and pirate bugs.

The two infraorders Cimicomorpha and Pentatomorpha have very similar characteristics, possibly as a result of the evolution of plant feeding. The key similarity that unites the Cimicomorpha and Pentatomorpha is the loss of the arolia (adhesive pads) on the pretarsi of the insects. These two infraorders comprise 90% of Heteroptera species.

These insects are a part of the old, informal classification of "Geocorisae" (land bugs). Among these bugs, parental care has evolved several times. Parental care varies from brooding of the eggs by the female, to a more active form that involves protection of young against predators and the female covering the nymphs under her body.

== Superfamilies and families ==
BioLib includes:

superfamily Cimicoidea Latreille, 1802

- Anthocoridae Fieber, 1837 – flower bugs, pirate bugs
- Cimicidae Latreille, 1802 – bedbugs
- Nabidae A. Costa, 1853 – damsel bugs
- Curaliidae Schuh, Weirauch & Henry, 2008
- Lasiochilidae
- Lyctocoridae Reuter, 1884
- Plokiophilidae China, 1953
- Polyctenidae Westwood, 1874 – Old World bat bugs

superfamily Miroidea Hahn, 1833

- Microphysidae Dohrn, 1859
- Miridae Hahn, 1833 – plant bugs
- †Ebboidae Perrichot et al., 2006

superfamily Reduvioidea Latreille, 1807

- Reduviidae Latreille, 1807 – assassin and thread-legged bugs
- †Ceresopseidae Becker-Migdisova, 1958
- Pachynomidae Stål, 1873

superfamily Tingoidea Laporte, 1832

- Tingidae Laporte, 1832 – lace bugs
- †Hispanocaderidae Golub & Popov, 2012
- †Ignotingidae Zhang, Golub, Popov & Shcherbakov, 2005

superfamily Joppeicoidea Reuter, 1910

- Joppeicidae Reuter, 1910

superfamily Thaumastocoroidea Kirkaldy, 1908

- Thaumastocoridae Kirkaldy, 1908 – royal palm bugs

=== incertae sedis and other fossil taxa ===
- Velocipedidae Bergroth, 1891
- †Vetanthocoridae Yao et al., 2006
- †Torirostratidae Yao, Cai, Shih & Engel 2014
- genus †Sternocoris Popov, 1986
