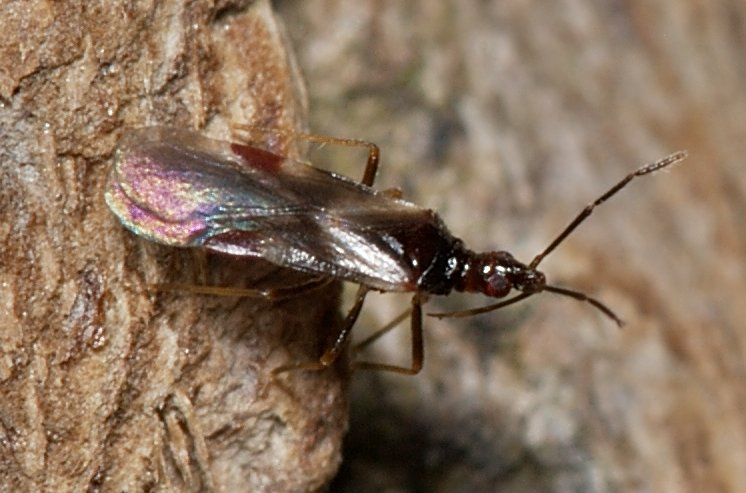
- male Loricula sp. (<2 mm) from Cologne, Germany

Scientific classification
- Domain: Eukaryota
- Kingdom: Animalia
- Phylum: Arthropoda
- Class: Insecta
- Order: Hemiptera
- Suborder: Heteroptera
- Infraorder: Cimicomorpha
- Superfamily: Miroidea
- Family: Microphysidae; Dohrn, 1859

Genera
- See text

= Microphysidae =

Microphysidae Temporal range: Late Cretaceous–Present

Family of true bugs

The Microphysidae are a very small family of true bugs, comprising only 5 extant genera.

== Systematics ==
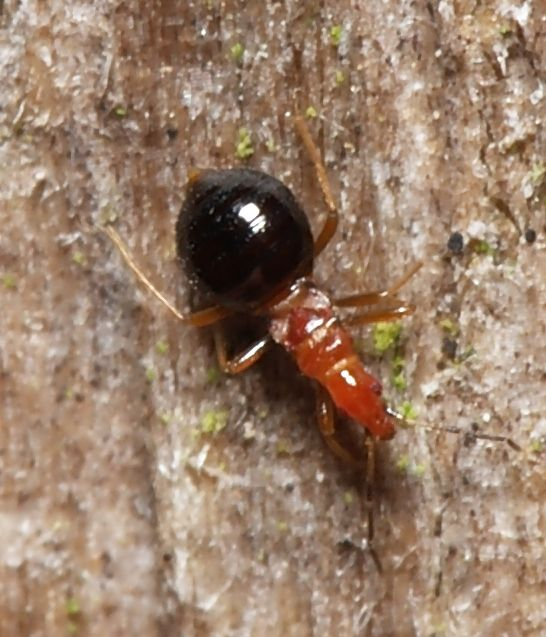
female Loricula sp. (<2 mm) from Cologne, Germany

Until recently, many authors considered these bugs to belong within the family Anthocoridae. A 2022 molecular phylogenetics study groups them with Joppeicidae in the proposed clade Microphysoidea. A 2023 study recovers them instead as relatively basal Cimiciformes.

The following genera belong to this family:

Subfamily Microphysinae

- Genus Chinaola Blatchley
- Genus Loricula Curtis (= Microphysa)
- Genus Mallochiola Bergroth
- Genus Myrmedobia Bärensprung
- Genus †Myrmericula Popov
- Genus †Popovophysa McKellar & Engel 2011, Canadian amber, Campanian
- Genus †Tytthophysa Popov & Herczek 2009 Baltic amber, Eocene

Subfamily Ciorullinae

- Genus Ciorulla Péricart
