= List of Polymerus species =

This is a list of 100 species in Polymerus, a genus of plant bugs in the family Miridae.

== Polymerus species ==
- Polymerus amazonicus Carvalho, 1976^{c g}
- Polymerus americanus (Reuter, 1876)^{i c g}
- Polymerus amurensis Kerzhner, 1988^{c g}
- Polymerus andinus Carvalho and Carpintero, 1989^{c g}
- Polymerus aristeae Ferreira, 1979^{c g}
- Polymerus asperulae (Fieber, 1861)^{c g}
- Polymerus atacamensis Carvalho and Carpintero, 1986^{c g}
- Polymerus aureus (Ballard, 1927)^{c g}
- Polymerus balli Knight, 1925^{i c g}
- Polymerus basalis (Reuter, 1876)^{i c g b} (red-spotted aster mirid)
- Polymerus basivittis (Reuter, 1909)^{i c g}
- Polymerus bimaculatus (Poppius, 1910)^{c g}
- Polymerus brevicornis (Reuter, 1879)^{c g}
- Polymerus brevirostris Knight, 1925^{i c g}
- Polymerus brevis Knight, 1925^{i c g}
- Polymerus caligatus (Stål, 1860)^{c g}
- Polymerus carpathicus (Horvath, 1882)^{c g}
- Polymerus carpinteroi Carvalho and Wallerstein, 1978^{c g}
- Polymerus castilleja Schwartz, 1989^{i c g}
- Polymerus chilensis Carvalho and Gomes, 1969^{c g}
- Polymerus chrysopsis Knight, 1925^{i c g}
- Polymerus coccineus (Spinola, 1852)^{c g}
- Polymerus cognatus (Fieber, 1858)^{i c g}
- Polymerus consanguineus (Distant, 1904)^{c g}
- Polymerus costalis Knight, 1943^{i c g}
- Polymerus cunealis (Reuter, 1907)^{c}
- Polymerus cuneatus (Distant, 1893)^{c}
- Polymerus delongi Knight, 1925^{i c g}
- Polymerus diffusus (Uhler, 1872)^{i c g}
- Polymerus dissimilis (Reuter, 1896)^{c g}
- Polymerus ecuadorense Carvalho and Gomes, 1968^{c g}
- Polymerus elegans (Reuter, 1909)^{i c g}
- Polymerus fasciolus Knight, 1943^{i c g}
- Polymerus flaviloris Knight, 1925^{i c g}
- Polymerus flavipes (Distant, 1904)^{c g}
- Polymerus flavocostatus Knight, 1926^{i c g}
- Polymerus forughae Linnavuori and Hosseini, 2000^{c g}
- Polymerus froeschneri Knight, 1923^{i c g}
- Polymerus fulvipes Knight, 1923^{i c g b}
- Polymerus funestus (Reuter, 1906)^{c g}
- Polymerus gerhardi Knight, 1923^{i c g}
- Polymerus gracilentus Knight, 1925^{i c g}
- Polymerus hirtulus Wagner, 1959^{c g}
- Polymerus hirtus Knight, 1943^{i c g}
- Polymerus holosericeus Hahn, 1831^{i c g}
- Polymerus illini Knight, 1941^{i c g}
- Polymerus lammesi Rinne, 1989^{c g}
- Polymerus lanuginosus (Distant, 1893)^{c}
- Polymerus longirostris (Reuter, 1905)^{c g}
- Polymerus madagascariensis (Poppius, 1914)^{c g}
- Polymerus microphthalmus (Wagner, 1951)^{c g}
- Polymerus minutus Ferreira, 1979^{c g}
- Polymerus modestus (Blanchard, 1852)^{c g}
- Polymerus nigrigulis Knight, 1926^{i c g}
- Polymerus nigritus (Fallén, 1807)^{c g}
- Polymerus nigropallidus Knight, 1923^{i c g}
- Polymerus nitidus (Odhiambo, 1960)^{c g}
- Polymerus nubilipes Knight, 1925^{i c g}
- Polymerus obscuratus (Poppius, 1914)^{c g}
- Polymerus ocellatus (V. Signoret, 1864)^{c g}
- Polymerus opacus Knight, 1923^{i c g b}
- Polymerus ornatifrons Odhiambo, 1959^{c g}
- Polymerus pallescens (Walker, 1873)^{i c g}
- Polymerus pallidus Maldonado, 1969^{c g}
- Polymerus palustris (Reuter, 1905)^{c g}
- Polymerus pekinensis Horváth, 1901^{c g}
- Polymerus peruanus Carvalho and Melendez, 1986^{c g}
- Polymerus proximus Knight, 1923^{i c g b}
- Polymerus punctipes Knight, 1923^{i c g}
- Polymerus relativus Knight, 1926^{i c g}
- Polymerus robustus Henry, 1978^{i c g}
- Polymerus rostratus T. Henry, 1978^{c g}
- Polymerus rubescens Carvalho and Schaffner, 1973^{c g}
- Polymerus rubidus (Reuter, 1896)^{c g}
- Polymerus rubrocuneatus Knight, 1925^{i c g b} (red-cuneus plant bug)
- Polymerus rubroornatus Knight, 1926^{c g}
- Polymerus rufipes Knight, 1926^{i c g}
- Polymerus rugulus (Ballard, 1927)^{c g}
- Polymerus sculleni Knight, 1943^{i c g}
- Polymerus severini Knight, 1925^{i c g}
- Polymerus shawi Knight, 1943^{i c g}
- Polymerus solitus (Walker, 1873)^{c g}
- Polymerus standishi Knight, 1943^{i c g}
- Polymerus sticticus (Stål, 1860)^{c g}
- Polymerus tepastus Rinne, 1989^{c g}
- Polymerus testaceipes (Stål, 1860)^{i c g b}
- Polymerus tinctipes Knight, 1923^{i c g}
- Polymerus tomentosus Villers, 1789^{c g}
- Polymerus tumidifrons Knight, 1925^{i c g}
- Polymerus uhleri (Van Duzee, 1914)^{i c g}
- Polymerus unifasciatus (Fabricius, 1794)^{i c g b}
- Polymerus vegatus (Van Duzee, 1933)^{c g}
- Polymerus venaticus (Uhler, 1872)^{i c g b}
- Polymerus venestus ^{b}
- Polymerus venustus Knight, 1923^{i c g}
- Polymerus vittatipennis Knight, 1943^{i c g}
- Polymerus voelzkovi (Reuter, 1907)^{c g}
- Polymerus vulneratus (Wolff, 1801)^{i c g}
- Polymerus wheeleri Henry, 1979^{i c g}
- Polymerus xerophilus Linnavuori, 1975^{c g}

Data sources: i = ITIS, c = Catalogue of Life, g = GBIF, b = Bugguide.net
