= Polymerus testaceipes =

Scientific classification
- Kingdom: Animalia
- Phylum: Arthropoda
- Clade: Pancrustacea
- Class: Insecta
- Order: Hemiptera
- Suborder: Heteroptera
- Family: Miridae
- Tribe: Mirini
- Genus: Polymerus
- Species: P. testaceipes

Binomial name
- Polymerus testaceipes (Stål, 1860)

Species of true bug

Polymerus testaceipes is a species of plant bug in the family Miridae. It is found in the Caribbean Sea, Central America, North America, and South America.
