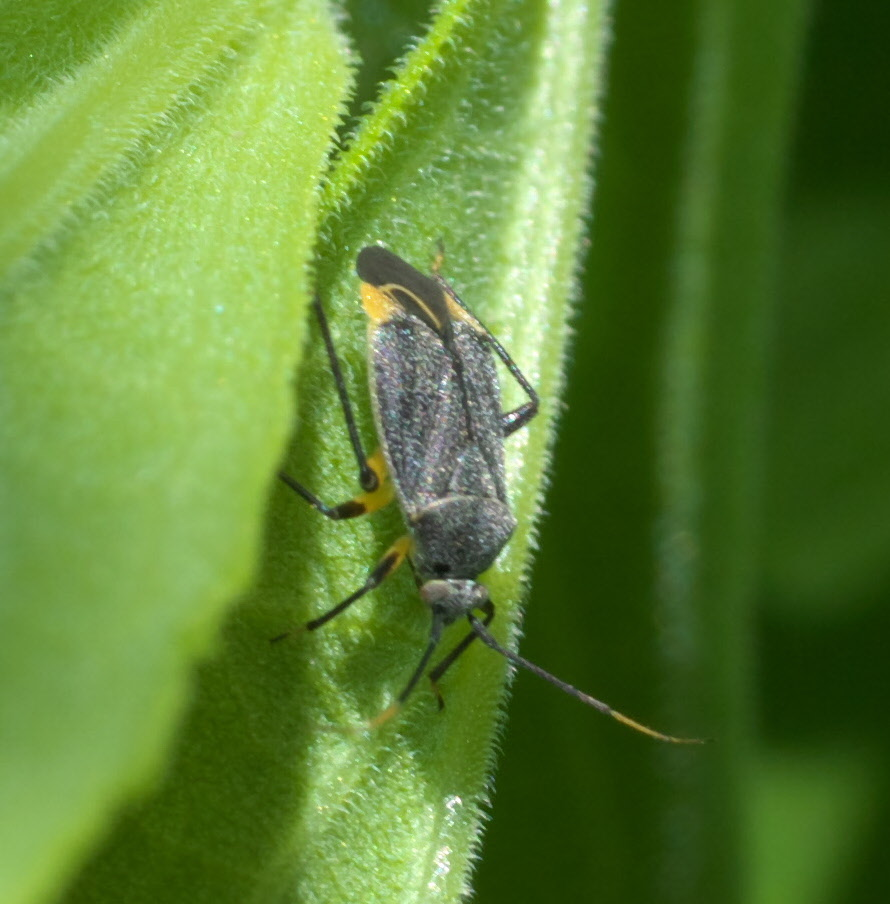

Scientific classification
- Kingdom: Animalia
- Phylum: Arthropoda
- Class: Insecta
- Order: Hemiptera
- Suborder: Heteroptera
- Family: Miridae
- Genus: Polymerus
- Species: P. venaticus

Binomial name
- Polymerus venaticus (Uhler, 1872)

= Polymerus venaticus =

Species of plant bug

Polymerus venaticus is a species of plant bug in the family Miridae. It is found in North America.
