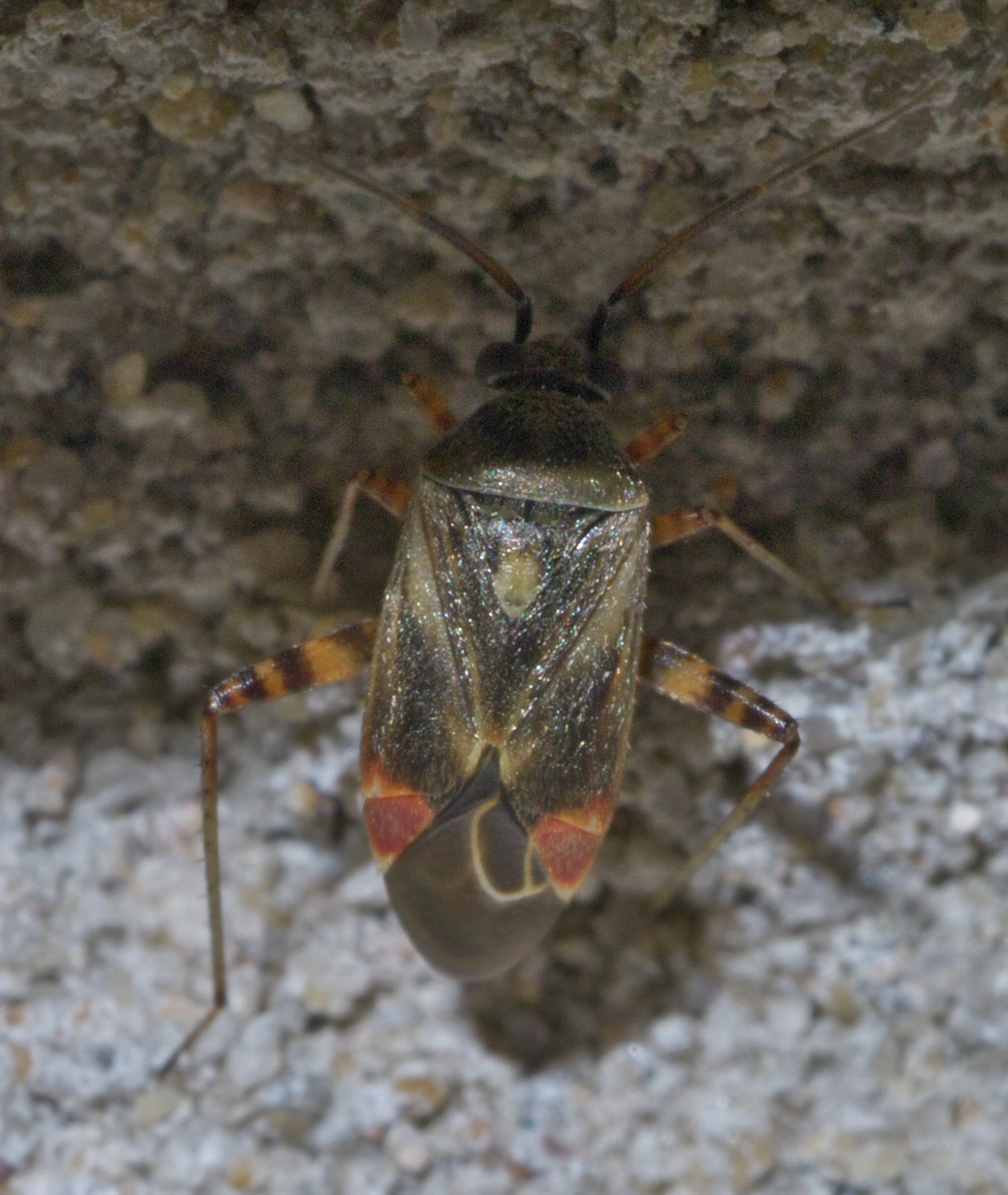

Scientific classification
- Kingdom: Animalia
- Phylum: Arthropoda
- Clade: Pancrustacea
- Class: Insecta
- Order: Hemiptera
- Suborder: Heteroptera
- Family: Miridae
- Tribe: Mirini
- Genus: Polymerus
- Species: P. basalis

Binomial name
- Polymerus basalis (Reuter, 1876)

= Polymerus basalis =

Species of true bug

Polymerus basalis, the red-spotted aster mirid, is a species of plant bug in the family Miridae. It is found in Central America and North America.

== Subspecies ==
These two subspecies belong to the species Polymerus basalis:

- Polymerus basalis basalis (Reuter, 1897)
- Polymerus basalis fuscatus Knight, 1926
