= Polymerus proximus =

Scientific classification
- Kingdom: Animalia
- Phylum: Arthropoda
- Class: Insecta
- Order: Hemiptera
- Suborder: Heteroptera
- Family: Miridae
- Tribe: Mirini
- Genus: Polymerus
- Species: P. proximus

Binomial name
- Polymerus proximus Knight, 1923

Species of true bug

Polymerus proximus is a species of plant bug in the family Miridae. It is found in North America.
