= Polymerus fulvipes =

Scientific classification
- Kingdom: Animalia
- Phylum: Arthropoda
- Class: Insecta
- Order: Hemiptera
- Suborder: Heteroptera
- Family: Miridae
- Tribe: Mirini
- Genus: Polymerus
- Species: P. fulvipes

Binomial name
- Polymerus fulvipes Knight, 1923

Species of true bug

Polymerus fulvipes is a species of plant bug in the family Miridae. It is found in North America.
