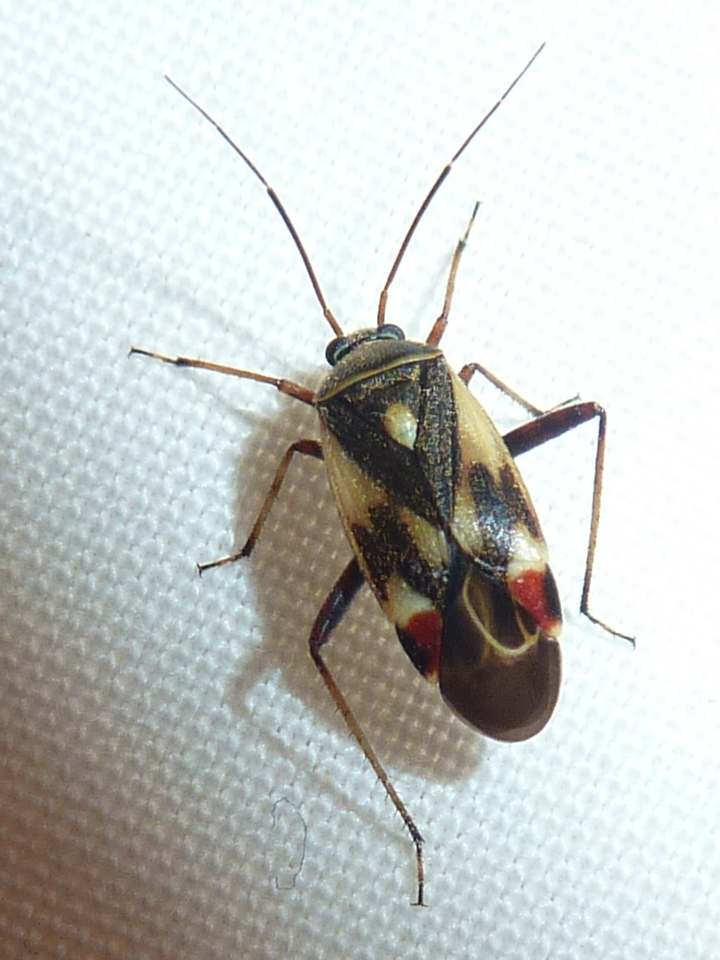

Scientific classification
- Kingdom: Animalia
- Phylum: Arthropoda
- Class: Insecta
- Order: Hemiptera
- Suborder: Heteroptera
- Family: Miridae
- Genus: Polymerus
- Species: P. unifasciatus

Binomial name
- Polymerus unifasciatus (Fabricius, 1794)

= Polymerus unifasciatus =

Species of true bug

Polymerus unifasciatus is a species of plant bug in the family Miridae. It is found in Europe and Northern Asia (excluding China), North America, and Southern Asia.

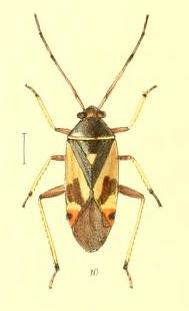

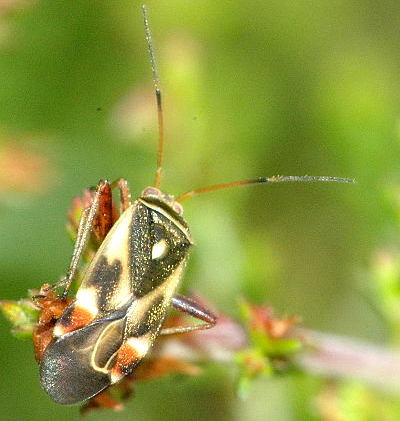
