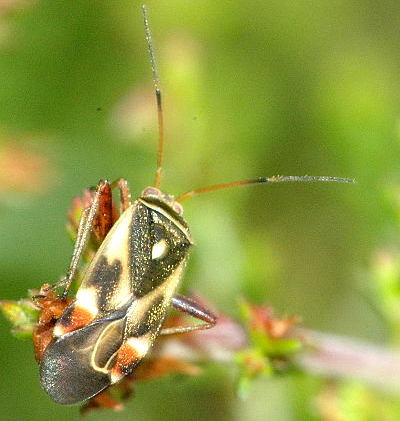
- Polymerus unifasciatus

Scientific classification
- Kingdom: Animalia
- Phylum: Arthropoda
- Clade: Pancrustacea
- Class: Insecta
- Order: Hemiptera
- Suborder: Heteroptera
- Family: Miridae
- Tribe: Mirini
- Genus: Polymerus; Hahn, 1831

Diversity
- ca. 100 species

Synonyms
- Poeciloscytus Fieber, 1858

= Polymerus =

Genus of true bugs

Polymerus is a genus of plant bugs in the family Miridae. There are at least 100 described species in Polymerus.

== See also ==
- List of Polymerus species
