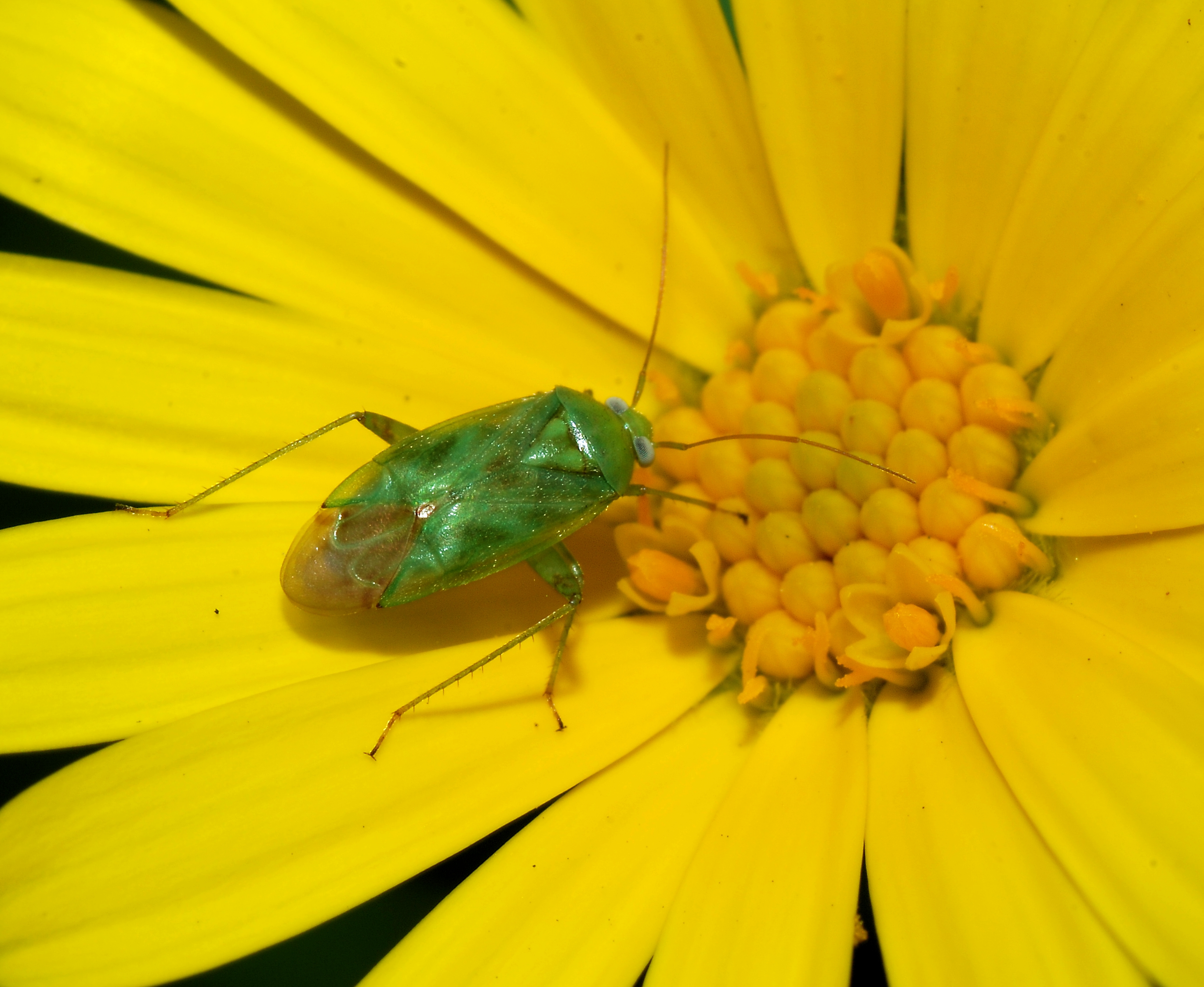

Scientific classification
- Kingdom: Animalia
- Phylum: Arthropoda
- Class: Insecta
- Order: Hemiptera
- Suborder: Heteroptera
- Family: Miridae
- Genus: Lygocoris
- Species: L. pabulinus

Binomial name
- Lygocoris pabulinus (Linnaeus, 1761)

= Lygocoris pabulinus =

Species of true bug

Lygocoris pabulinus, also known as the common green capsid, is a Holarctic species of bug from the family Miridae which can be found throughout Europe (except for Greece, Malta, and Iceland). It is an adventive species in North America. Lygocoris pabulinus feeds on a variety of plants.

== Description ==
The prothorax of those species is smooth, and the whole upper surface is usually green.

== Ecology ==
Lygocoris pabulinus can be found on almost all herbaceous and woody plants, especially nettles. Females lay their eggs in the fruit trees leaves. When the eggs hatch in spring, they start feeding on gooseberries, basswood, potatoes, and other fruits and vegetables. They also can be found in the green houses sucking on peppers. The nymphs of the species are yellowish-green coloured, and are wingless. The adult species can fly from fruit to fruit. Aside from feeding on various crops, they also feed on aphids, caterpillars, and mites.

== Habitat ==
They hide under fallen leaves in winter, especially under the hedge, which can be a perfect place for them to lay their eggs.

== Courtship and sexual attraction ==
The males of the species vibrate their abdomen while courting. The females legs either carry a close-range sex pheromone or it is accumulated on the legs because of the grooming behavior. The extract of the legs contains a few of hydrocarbons including n-alkenes, n-alkanes, and some methylalkanes. The female also extracts pentacosene, while male extracts heptacosene. The females have elicited similar to males responses, which means that the pheromone is living on the substrate.

== Pest ==
They feed on leaves by leaving small brown holes in the foliage. After the damage is done, the species leave, leaving the flowers open lop sided. The species can damage fruits as well, by leaving bumps on them. When they drink the sap, they inject their poisonous salivary juices, which can cause buds, leaves and fruit distortions.
