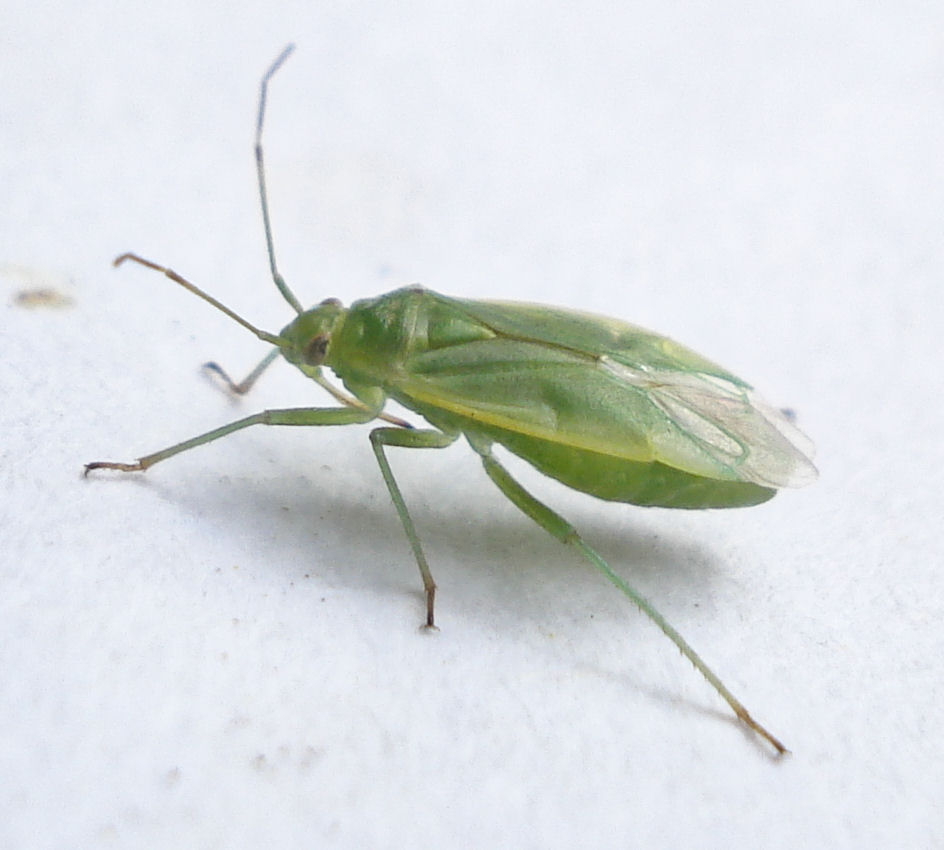
- Lygocoris rugicollis by Mick Talbot

Scientific classification
- Domain: Eukaryota
- Kingdom: Animalia
- Phylum: Arthropoda
- Class: Insecta
- Order: Hemiptera
- Suborder: Heteroptera
- Family: Miridae
- Genus: Lygocoris
- Species: L. rugicollis

Binomial name
- Lygocoris rugicollis Fallén, 1807

Synonyms
- Lygaeus rugicollis Fallén, 1807; Phytocoris rugicollis Fallén, 1829; Plesiocoris rugicollis Fieber, 1861

= Lygocoris rugicollis =

Species of true bug

Lygocoris rugicollis is a widespread, common species of bug in the Miridae family. It feeds on a large variety of bushes and small trees, but especially willows (members of the Salicaceae) and slightly less often alders (members of the Betulaceae). It can be found throughout Europe, including the UK, and Spain, in North Africa, as far east as Central Asia, in Alaska and Canada, including the Maritimes.

== Description ==
Adults are 5.5–7.0 millimetres (0.22–0.28 in) long and are yellow coloured. The prothorax of the species is strongly wrinkled with an apparently hairless upper surface. Lygocoris rugicollis looks like its cousin Orthotylus marginalis.

== Ecology ==
Lygocoris rugicollis is active from May to October, and feeds on plants, particularly on members of the Salicaceae and Betulaceae families. It has been reported as a pest on pome (apple trees) and ribes (currant and gooseberry bushes) in Europe.
