= Lygocoris =

Scientific classification
- Domain: Eukaryota
- Kingdom: Animalia
- Phylum: Arthropoda
- Class: Insecta
- Order: Hemiptera
- Suborder: Heteroptera
- Family: Miridae
- Subfamily: Mirinae
- Tribe: Mirini
- Genus: Lygocoris; Reuter, 1875

Genus of true bugs

Lygocoris is a genus of true bugs belonging to the family Miridae.

The species of this genus are found in Eurasia and North America.

Species:

- Lygocoris bimaculata (Fabricius, 1803)
- Lygocoris boninensis (Yasunaga, 1992)
- Lygocoris communis (Knight, 1916)
- Lygocoris pabulinus
- Lygocoris rugicollis
