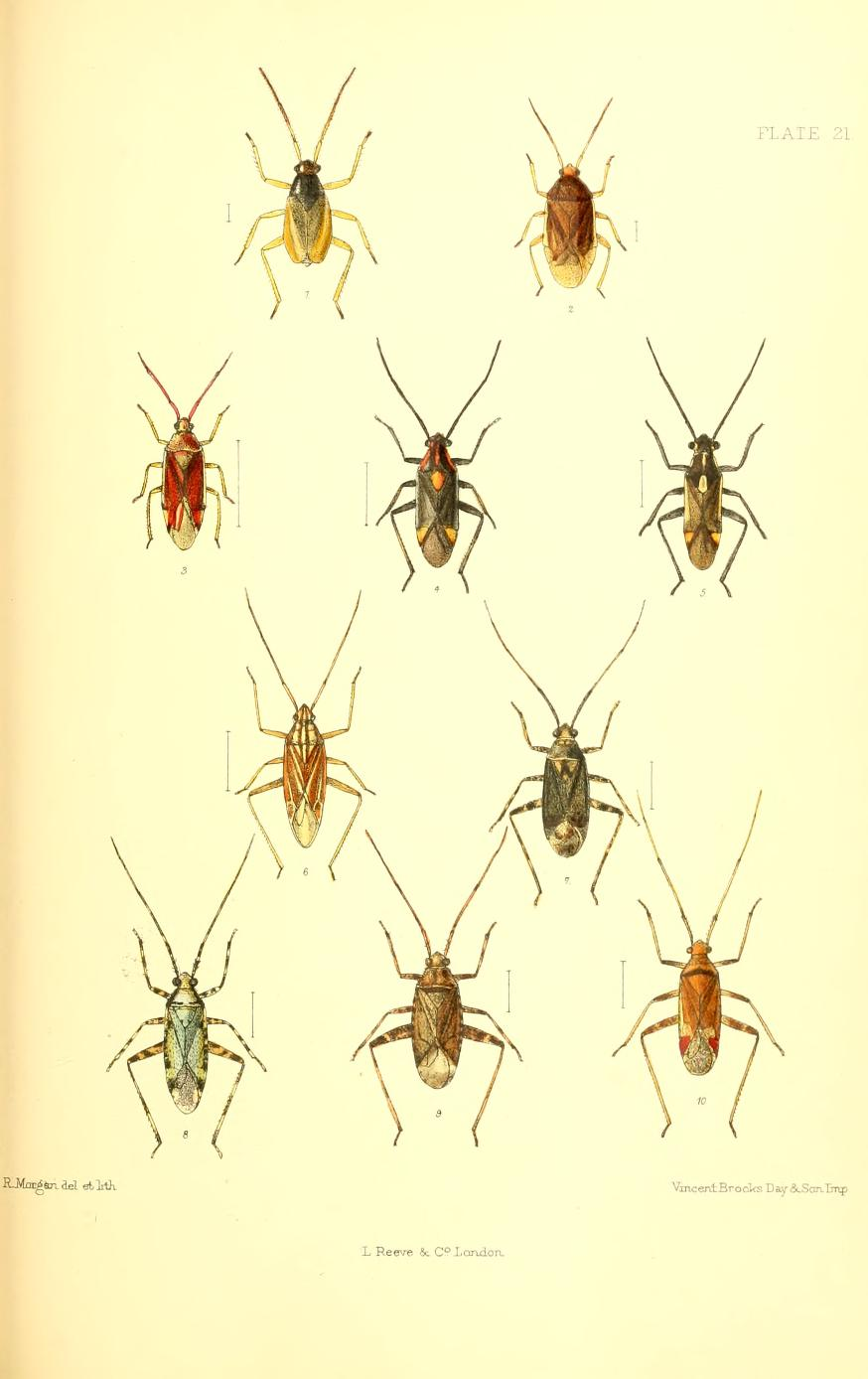
- Pantilius

Scientific classification
- Domain: Eukaryota
- Kingdom: Animalia
- Phylum: Arthropoda
- Class: Insecta
- Order: Hemiptera
- Suborder: Heteroptera
- Family: Miridae
- Genus: Pantilius; Curtis, 1833

= Pantilius =

Genus of true bugs

Pantilius is a genus of true bugs belonging to the family Miridae.

The species of this genus are found in Europe.

Species:

- Pantilius gonoceroides Reuter, 1903
- Pantilius hayashii Miyamoto & Yasunaga, 1989
- Pantilius tunicatus (Fabricius, 1781)
