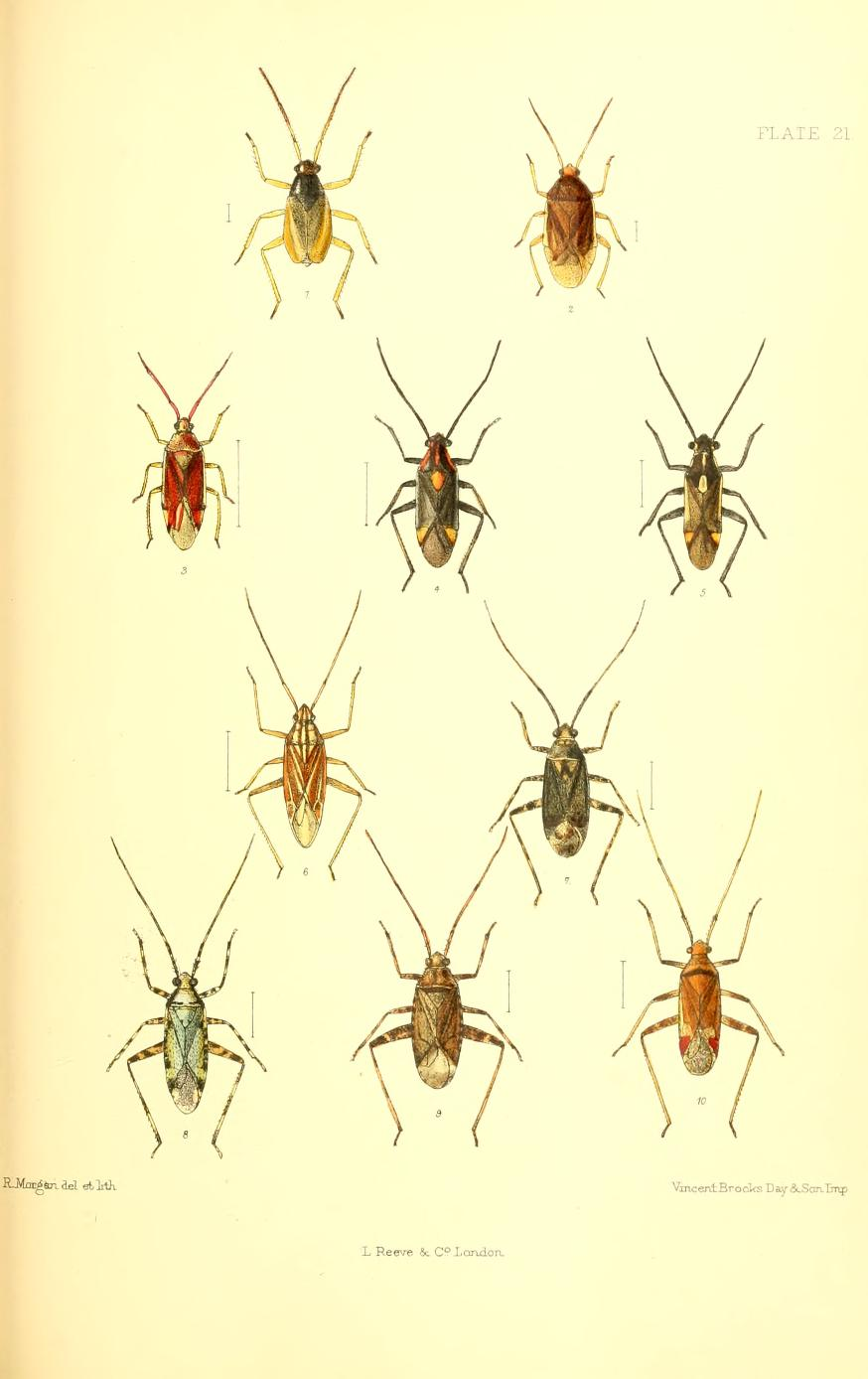
- Pantilius tunicatus depicted in Edward Saunders Hemiptera Heteroptera of the British Islands (figure 3)

Scientific classification
- Kingdom: Animalia
- Phylum: Arthropoda
- Class: Insecta
- Order: Hemiptera
- Suborder: Heteroptera
- Family: Miridae
- Genus: Pantilius
- Species: P. tunicatus

Binomial name
- Pantilius tunicatus (Fabricius, 1781)

= Pantilius tunicatus =

Species of true bug

Pantilius tunicatus, the hazel plant bug is a species of true bug in the Miridae family. It can be found in the Baltic states, Faroe Islands, Finland, Italy, United Kingdom, Yugoslavia, the Netherlands, Eastern, Central, and Western Europe (except for Portugal). and across the Palearctic to Siberia and northern China. It can also be found in Scandinavia with the exception of the high north and the northern Mediterranean.The species feed on hazel and usually are found on the lowest branches of it. The adults have a brown pronotum and green legs, with the antennae shorter than the body. The species doesn't appear until September.
