= List of Plagiognathus species =

This is a list of species in the genus Plagiognathus.

== Plagiognathus species ==
- Plagiognathus alashanensis Qui and Nonnizab, 1993
- Plagiognathus albatus (Van Duzee, 1915)
- Plagiognathus albifacies Knight, 1927
- Plagiognathus alboradialis Knight, 1923
- Plagiognathus albus Reuter, 1894
- Plagiognathus alnicenatus (Knight, 1923)
- Plagiognathus alpinus (Van Duzee, 1916)
- Plagiognathus amorphae (Knight, 1930)
- Plagiognathus amurensis Reuter, 1883
- Plagiognathus annulatus Uhler, 1895
- Plagiognathus aquilinus Schuh, 2001
- Plagiognathus arbustorum (Fabricius, 1794)
- Plagiognathus astericola (Knight, 1930)
- Plagiognathus atricornis Knight, 1926
- Plagiognathus biobioensis (Carvalho, 1984)
- Plagiognathus bipunctatus Reuter, 1883
- Plagiognathus blatchleyi Reuter, 1912 (Blatchley's mirid)
- Plagiognathus brevicornis (Knight, 1929)
- Plagiognathus brevirostris Knight, 1923
- Plagiognathus brunneus (Provancher, 1872)
- Plagiognathus chrysanthemi (Wolff, 1804) (trefoil plant bug)
- Plagiognathus cibbetsi Schuh, 2001
- Plagiognathus collaris (Matsumura, 1972)
- Plagiognathus concoloris Schuh, 2001
- Plagiognathus confusus Reuter, 1909
- Plagiognathus cornicola Knight, 1923
- Plagiognathus crocinus Knight, 1927
- Plagiognathus cuneatus Knight, 1923
- Plagiognathus davisi Knight, 1923
- Plagiognathus delicatus (Uhler, 1887)
- Plagiognathus dimorphus Schuh, 2001
- Plagiognathus dispar Knight, 1923
- Plagiognathus emarginatae Schuh, 2001
- Plagiognathus fenderi Schuh, 2001
- Plagiognathus flavicornis Knight, 1923
- Plagiognathus flavidus Knight, 1929
- Plagiognathus flavipes (Provancher, 1872)
- Plagiognathus flavoscutellatus Knight, 1923
- Plagiognathus flavus Knight, 1964
- Plagiognathus fulvaceus Knight, 1964
- Plagiognathus fulvidus Knight, 1923
- Plagiognathus fumidus (Uhler, 1875)
- Plagiognathus fusciloris Reuter, 1878
- Plagiognathus fuscipes Knight, 1929
- Plagiognathus fuscosus (Provancher, 1872)
- Plagiognathus grandis Reuter, 1876
- Plagiognathus guttatipes (Uhler, 1895)
- Plagiognathus guttulosus (Reuter, 1876)
- Plagiognathus hallucinatus Schuh, 2001
- Plagiognathus laricicola Knight, 1923
- Plagiognathus lattini Schuh, 2001
- Plagiognathus lineatus Van Duzee, 1917
- Plagiognathus lividellus Kerzhner, 1979
- Plagiognathus longipennis (Uhler, 1895)
- Plagiognathus longirostris (Knight, 1923)
- Plagiognathus lonicerae Schuh, 2001
- Plagiognathus louisianus Schuh, 2001
- Plagiognathus luteus Knight, 1929
- Plagiognathus maculipennis (Knight, 1923)
- Plagiognathus maculosus Zhao, 1996
- Plagiognathus melliferae Schuh, 2001
- Plagiognathus mexicanus Schuh, 2001
- Plagiognathus mineus (Knight, 1929)
- Plagiognathus minuendus (Knight, 1927)
- Plagiognathus modestus (Reuter, 1912)
- Plagiognathus moerens Reuter, 1909
- Plagiognathus monardellae Schuh, 2001
- Plagiognathus morrisoni (Knight, 1923)
- Plagiognathus mundus Van Duzee, 1917
- Plagiognathus negundinis Knight, 1929
- Plagiognathus nigronitens Knight, 1923
- Plagiognathus notodysmicos Schuh, 2001
- Plagiognathus obscurus Uhler, 1872 (obscure plant bug)
- Plagiognathus occipitalis Reuter, 1908
- Plagiognathus paddocki Knight, 1964
- Plagiognathus paramundus Schuh, 2001
- Plagiognathus parshleyi (Knight, 1923)
- Plagiognathus pemptos Schuh, 2001
- Plagiognathus phaceliae Schuh, 2001
- Plagiognathus phorodendronae Knight, 1929
- Plagiognathus physocarpi (Henry, 1981)
- Plagiognathus piceicola Schuh, 2001
- Plagiognathus polhemorum Schuh, 2001
- Plagiognathus politus Uhler, 1895
- Plagiognathus punctatipes Knight, 1923
- Plagiognathus reinhardi Johnston, 1935
- Plagiognathus repetitus Knight, 1923
- Plagiognathus ribesi Kelton, 1982
- Plagiognathus rideri Schuh, 2001
- Plagiognathus rileyi Schuh, 2001
- Plagiognathus rosicola Knight, 1923
- Plagiognathus rosicoloides Schuh, 2001
- Plagiognathus rubidus (Poppius, 1911)
- Plagiognathus salicicola Knight, 1929
- Plagiognathus salviae Knight, 1968
- Plagiognathus schaffneri Schuh, 2001
- Plagiognathus shepherdiae Knight, 1929
- Plagiognathus shoshonea Knight, 1964
- Plagiognathus similis Knight, 1923
- Plagiognathus stitti Knight, 1964
- Plagiognathus subovatus Knight, 1929
- Plagiognathus suffuscipennis Knight, 1923
- Plagiognathus syrticolae Knight, 1941
- Plagiognathus tenellus Knight, 1929
- Plagiognathus texanus Schuh, 2001
- Plagiognathus tinctus Knight, 1923
- Plagiognathus tsugae (Knight, 1923)
- Plagiognathus tumidifrons (Knight, 1923)
- Plagiognathus urticae Knight, 1964
- Plagiognathus verticalis (Uhler, 1894)
- Plagiognathus vitellinus (Scholtz, 1847)
- Plagiognathus viticola (Johnston, 1935)
