= List of Phylini genera =

These 151 genera belong to Phylini, a tribe of plant bugs in the family Miridae.

Tribe Phylini Douglas & Scott, 1865

- Subtribe Keltoniina Schuh & Menard, 2013
  - Genus Keltonia Knight, 1966 - Nearctic, Mexico
  - Genus Pseudatomoscelis Poppius, 1911 - Caribbean, Mexico
  - Genus Reuteroscopus Kirkaldy, 1905 - New World
  - Genus Waupsallus Linnavuori, 1975 - Africa
- Subtribe Oncotylina Douglas & Scott, 1865
  - Genus Acrotelus Reuter, 1885 - Palearctic
  - Genus Alloeotarsus Reuter, 1885 - Palearctic
  - Genus Americodema T. Henry, 1999 - Nearctic
  - Genus Angelopsallus Schuh, 2006 - Western Nearctic
  - Genus Antepia Seidenstiicker, 1962 - Palearctic
  - Genus Arizonapsallus Schuh, 2006 - Southwest Nearctic
  - Genus Asciodema Reuter, 1878 - Palearctic, Nearctic
  - Genus Bisulcopsallus Schuh, 2006 - Southwest Nearctic
  - Genus Brachyarthrum Fieber, 1858 - Palearctic
  - Genus Cariniocoris T. Henry, 1989 - Nearctic
  - Genus Ceratopsallus Schuh, 2006 - Western Nearctic
  - Genus Cercocarpopsallus Schuh, 2006 - Western Nearctic
  - Genus Chlorillus Kerzhner, 1962 - Palearctic
  - Genus Compsidolon Reuter, 1899 - Palearctic
  - Genus Crassomiris Weirauch, 2006 - Western Nearctic
  - Genus Damioscea Reuter, 1883 - Palearctic
  - Genus Dasycapsus Poppius, 1912 - Palearctic
  - Genus Europiella Reuter, 1909 - Holarctic
  - Genus Eurycolpus Reuter, 1875 - Palearctic
  - Genus Galbinocoris Weirauch, 2006 - Southwest Nearctic
  - Genus Glaucopterum Wagner, 1963 - Palearctic
  - Genus Hamatophylus Weirauch, 2006 - Nearctic, Mexico
  - Genus Hoplomachus Fieber, 1858 - Holarctic
  - Genus Ihermocoris Puton, 1875 - Palearctic
  - Genus Insulaphylus Weirauch, 2006 - Nearctic
  - Genus Josifovius Konstantinov, 2008 - Nearctic
  - Genus Kmentophylus Duwal, Yasunaga, & Lee, 2010 - Palearctic
  - Genus Knightophylinia Schaffner, 1978 - Nearctic
  - Genus Knightopiella Schuh, 2004 - Western Nearctic
  - Genus Knightopsallus Schuh, 2006 - Southwest Nearctic
  - Genus Leucodellus Reuter, 1906 - Nearctic
  - Genus Lineatopsallus T. Henry, 1991 - Nearctic
  - Genus Litoxenus Reuter, 1885 - Eastern Palearctic
  - Genus Maculamiris Weirauch, 2006 - Nearctic
  - Genus Malacotes Reuter, 1878 - Western Palearctic
  - Genus Marrubiocoris Wagner, 1970 - Palearctic
  - Genus Megalocoleus Reuter, 1890 - Western Palearctic
  - Genus Moiseevichia Schuh, 2006 - Africa
  - Genus Nanopsallus Wagner, 1952 - Southwestern Palearctic
  - Genus Neopsallus Schuh & Schwartz, 2004 - Western Nearctic
  - Genus Occidentodema T. Henry, 1999 - Western Nearctic
  - Genus Oligotylus Van Duzee, 1916 - Western Nearctic
  - Genus Omocoris Lindberg, 1930 - Palearctic
  - Genus Oncotylidea Wagner, 1965 - Palearctic
  - Genus Oncotylus Fieber, 1858 - Holarctic
  - Genus Opisthotaenia Reuter, 1901 - Palearctic
  - Genus Oreocapsus Linnavuori, 1975 - Palearctic
  - Genus Parachlorillus Wagner, 1963 - Palearctic
  - Genus Parapsallus Wagner, 1952 - Palearctic
  - Genus Paredrocoris Reuter, 1878 - Palearctic
  - Genus Phaeochiton Kerzhner, 1964 - Palearctic
  - Genus Phallospinophylus Weirauch, 2006 - Western Nearctic
  - Genus Phyllopidea Knight, 1919 - Western Nearctic
  - Genus Phymatopsallus Knight - Western Nearctic, Mexico
  - Genus Piceophylus Schwartz & Schuh, 1999 - Eastern Nearctic
  - Genus Pinophylus Schwartz & Schuh, 1999 - Nearctic
  - Genus Placochilus Fieber, 1858 - Palearctic
  - Genus Plagiognathus Fieber, 1858 - Holarctic
  - Genus Plesiodema Reuter, 1875 - Holarctic
  - Genus Pleuroxonotus Reuter, 1903 - Palearctic
  - Genus Pronototropis Reuter, 1879 - Palearctic
  - Genus Psallodema V. Putshkov, 1970 - Palearctic
  - Genus Psallomorpha Duwal Yasunaga, & Lee, 2010 - Palearctic
  - Genus Psallovius T. Henry - Nearctic
  - Genus Pygovepres Weirauch, 2006 - Western Nearctic
  - Genus Quercophylus Weirauch, 2006 - Western Nearctic
  - Genus Quernocoris Weirauch, 2006 - Western Nearctic
  - Genus Ranzovius Distant, 1893 - New World
  - Genus Rhinocapsus Uhler, 1890 - Eastern Nearctic
  - Genus Roburocoris Weirauch, 2009 - Nearctic
  - Genus Rubellomiris Weirauch, 2006 - Nearctic
  - Genus Rubeospineus Weirauch, 2006 - Nearctic
  - Genus Sacculifer Kerzhner, 1959 - Palearctic
  - Genus Salicopsallus Schuh, 2006 - Western Nearctic
  - Genus Schaffneropsallus Schuh, 2006 - Nearctic
  - Genus Stenoparia Fieber, 1870 - Palearctic
  - Genus Sthenaropsidea Henry & Schuh, 2002 - Eastern Nearctic
  - Genus Stictopsallus Schuh, 2006 - Western Nearctic
  - Genus Stirophylus Eckerlein & Wagner, 1965 - Palearctic
  - Genus Stoebea Schuh, 1974 - Africa
  - Genus Tapirula Carapezza, 1997 - Palearctic
  - Genus Tinicephalus Fieber, 1858 - Palearctic
  - Genus Tragiscocoris Fieber, 1861 - Palearctic
  - Genus Vanduzeephylus Schuh & Schwartz, 2004 - Western Nearctic
  - Genus Vesperocoris Weirauch, 2006 - Western Nearctic
  - Genus Viscacoris Weirauch, 2009 - Southwest Nearctic, Mexico
  - Genus Zophocnemis Kerzhner, 1962 - Palearctic
- Subtribe Phylina Douglas & Scott, 1865
  - Genus Adelphophylus Wagner, 1959 - Palearctic
  - Genus Agraptocoris Reuter, 1903 - Palearctic
  - Genus Alnopsallus Duwal, Yasunaga, & Lee, 2010 - Himalayan
  - Genus Alvarengamiris Carvalho, 1991 - Neotropics
  - Genus Amazonophilus Carvalho & Costa, 1993 - Neotropics
  - Genus Anapsallus Odhiambo, 1960 - Africa
  - Genus Anomalocornis Carvalho & Wygodzinsky, 1945 - Neotropics
  - Genus Arlemiris Carvalho, 1984 - Neotropics
  - Genus Bicurvicoris Carvalho & Schaffner, 1973 - Neotropics
  - Genus Botocudomiris Carvalho, 1979 - Neotropics
  - Genus Brachycranella Reuter, 1905 - Africa
  - Genus Conostethus Fieber, 1858 - Holarctic
  - Genus Crassicornus Carvalho, 1945 - Neotropics
  - Genus Darectagela Linnavuori, 1975 - Palearctic
  - Genus Darfuromma Linnavuori, 1975 - Africa
  - Genus Dignaia Linnavuori, 1975 - Palearctic
  - Genus Dominiquella Linnavuori, 1983 - Africa
  - Genus Ectagela Schmidt, K., 1939 - Palearctic, Africa
  - Genus Ellacapsus Yasunaga, 2013 - Orient
  - Genus Eremophylus Yasunaga, 2001 - Palearctic
  - Genus Farsiana Linnavuori, 1998 - Palearctic
  - Genus Gediocoris Wagner, 1964 - Palearctic
  - Genus Ghazalocoris Linnavuori, 1975 - Africa
  - Genus Gressittocapsus Schuh, 1984 - Orient
  - Genus Icodema Reuter, 1875 - Western Palearctic
  - Genus Indatractus Linnavuori, 1975 - Palearctic
  - Genus Izyaius Schwartz, 2006 - Eastern Nearctic
  - Genus Juniperia Linnavuori, 1965 - Palearctic
  - Genus Knightensis Schaffner, 1978 - Nearctic
  - Genus Lalyocoris Linnavuori, 1993 - Africa
  - Genus Lasiolabopella Schuh, 1974 - Africa
  - Genus Lepidargyrus Muminov, 1962 - Palearctic
  - Genus Lepidocapsus Poppius, 1914 - Africa
  - Genus Leptoxanthus Reuter, 1905 - Africa
  - Genus Liviopsallus Carapezza, 1982 - Palearctic
  - Genus Mendozaphylus Carvalho & Carpintero, 1991 - Neotropics
  - Genus Millerimiris Carvalho, 1951 - Africa
  - Genus Mixtecamiris Carvalho & Schaffner, 1973 - Nearctic
  - Genus Natalophylus Schuh, 1974 - Africa
  - Genus Nubaia Linnavuori, 1975 - Palearctic
  - Genus Orthonotus Stephens, 1829 - Palearctic
  - Genus Parafulvius Carvalho, 1954 - Neotropics
  - Genus Paravoruchia Wagner, 1959 - Palearctic
  - Genus Phylus Hahn, 1831 - Palearctic
  - Genus Plagiognathidea Poppius, 1914 - Africa
  - Genus Platyscytisca Costa & Henry, 1999 - Neotropics
  - Genus Platyscytus Reuter, 1907 - Neotropics
  - Genus Porophoroptera Carvalho & Gross, 1982 - Australia
  - Genus Psallus Fieber, 1858 - Holarctic
  - Genus Roudairea Puton & Reuter, 1886 - Palearctic
  - Genus Sasajiophylus Yasunaga, 2001 - Palearctic
  - Genus Somalocoris Linnavuori, 1975 - Palearctic
  - Genus Sthenarus Fieber, 1858 - Palearctic
  - Genus Stibaromma Odhiambo, 1961 - Africa
  - Genus Tibiopilus Carvalho & Costa, 1993 - Neotropics
  - Genus Trevessa China, 1924 - Indian Ocean
  - Genus Villaverdea Carvalho, 1990 - Neotropics
  - Genus Widdringtoniola Schuh, 1974 - Africa
  - Genus Zakanocoris V. Putshkov, 1970 - Palearctic
  - Genus Zanchiophylus Duwal, Yasunaga, & Lee, 2010 - Palearctic
