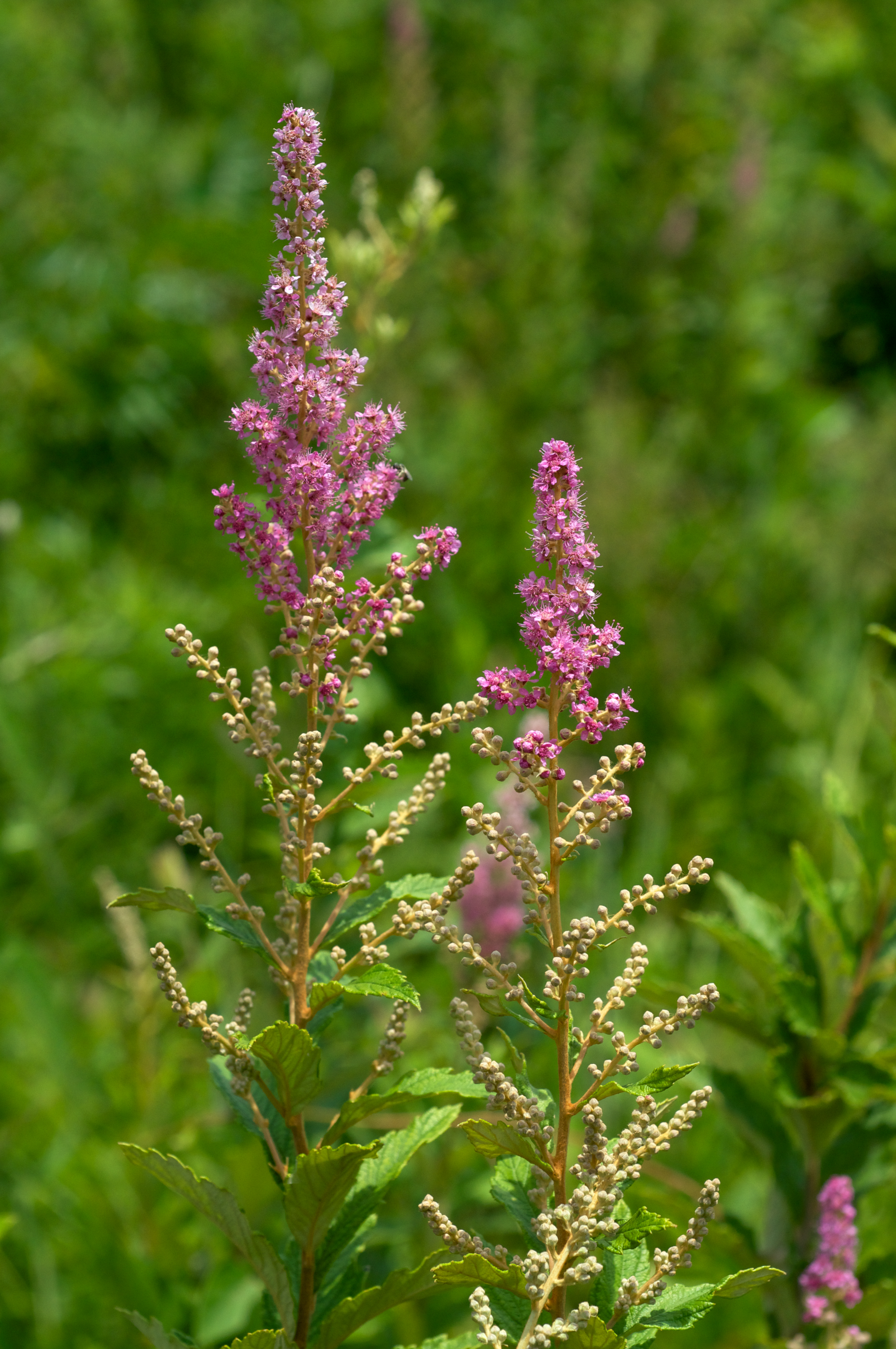

Scientific classification
- Kingdom: Plantae
- Clade: Tracheophytes
- Clade: Angiosperms
- Clade: Eudicots
- Clade: Rosids
- Order: Rosales
- Family: Rosaceae
- Genus: Spiraea
- Species: S. tomentosa

Binomial name
- Spiraea tomentosa L.

Synonyms
- List: Drimopogon ferruginea (Raf.) B.D.Jacks.; Drimopogon glomerata (Raf.) B.D.Jacks.; Drimopogon parvifolia (Raf.) B.D.Jacks.; Drimopogon rosea (Raf.) B.D.Jacks.; Drimopogon tomentosa (L.) B.D.Jacks.; Spiraea ferruginea Raf.; Spiraea glomerata Raf.; Spiraea parvifolia Raf.; Spiraea rosea Raf.

= Spiraea tomentosa =

Species of flowering plant

Spiraea tomentosa, commonly known as steeplebush, meadowsweet, or hardhack, or eastern hardhack, is a flowering plant native to the eastern United States and Canada.

== Description ==
Spiraea tomentosa grows to up to four feet high and prefers moist to wet soil and full sun. It blooms in summer. Each tiny, pink flower is about 1/16 of an inch wide and arranged in narrow, pyramid-shaped flowerheads that grow up to eight inches long. The flowers are followed by small, dry, brown fruit. The specific epithet tomentosa refers to the undersides of the leaves and the stems, which are covered in a dense white-woolly tomentum. It has similar characteristics to Spiraea douglasii.

== Ecology ==
The plant bug Plagiognathus fuscosus breeds on steeplebush. Many bees visit the flowers: Apis mellifera (non-native), Bombus griseocollis, Bombus impatiens, Lasioglossum atwoodi, Lasioglossum hitchensi, and Hylaeus mesillae.

== Uses ==
Steeplebush is noted for its astringent properties, which cause it to be used medicinally.

The hardiness zone for this plant is listed as zones 4 to 8.
