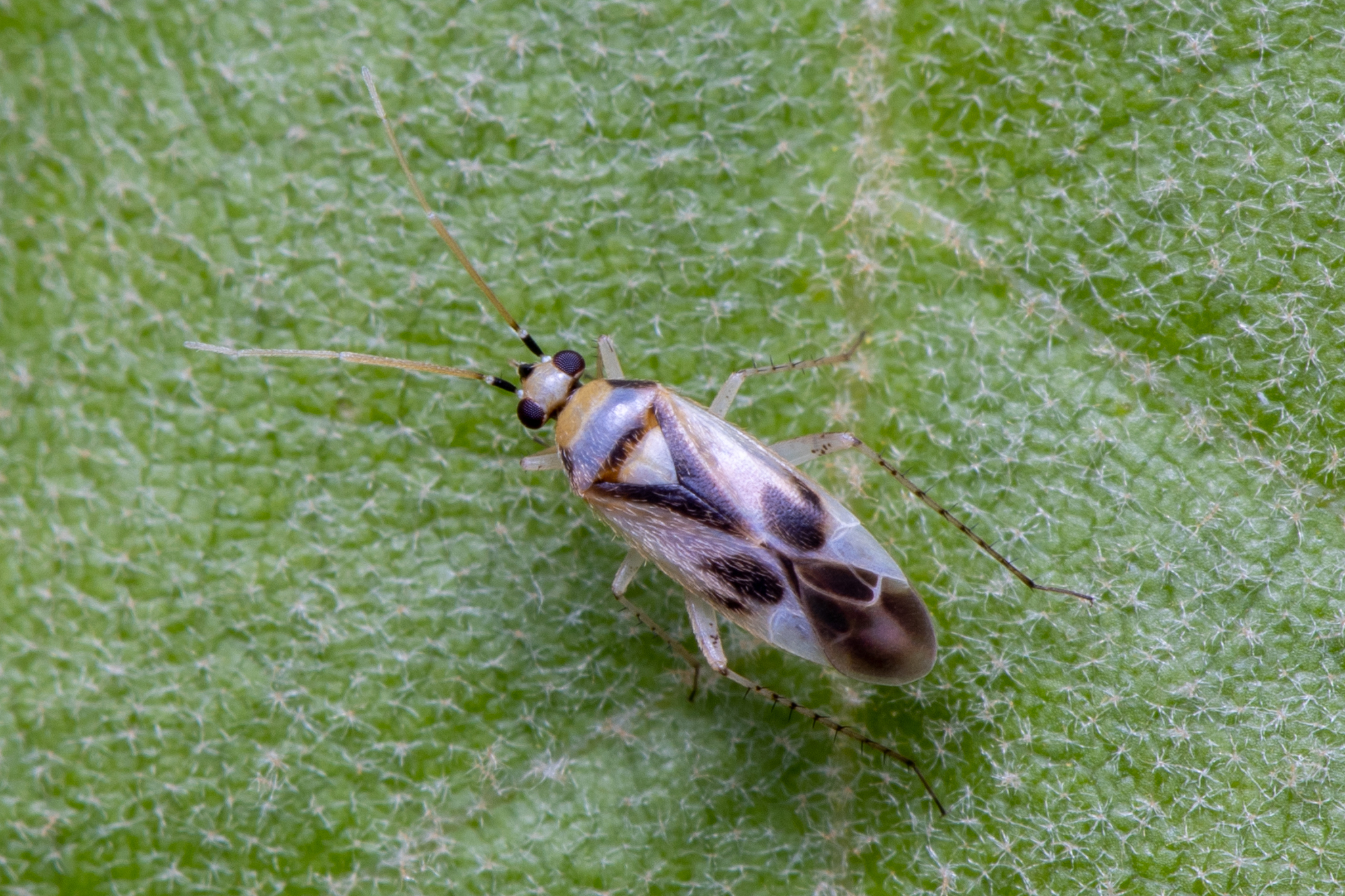

Scientific classification
- Kingdom: Animalia
- Phylum: Arthropoda
- Clade: Pancrustacea
- Class: Insecta
- Order: Hemiptera
- Suborder: Heteroptera
- Family: Miridae
- Subfamily: Phylinae
- Tribe: Phylini
- Genus: Plagiognathus
- Species: P. albatus

Binomial name
- Plagiognathus albatus (Van Duzee, 1915)

Synonyms
- Plagiognathus caryae Knight, 1923; Plagiognathus inopinus Knight, 1926; Plagiognathus repletus Knight, 1923; Plagiognathus repletus apicatus Knight, 1923; Plagiognathus repletus repletus Knight, 1923; Plagiognathus similis furvus Knight, 1923

= Plagiognathus albatus =

Species of true bug

Plagiognathus albatus, the Sycamore plantbug, is a species of plant bug in the family Miridae. It is found in North America.

== Subspecies ==
These three subspecies belong to the species Plagiognathus albatus:

- Plagiognathus albatus albatus (Van Duzee, 1915)
- Plagiognathus albatus vittiscutis Knight, 1923
- Plagiognathus similis similis
