= Plagiognathus verticalis =

Scientific classification
- Kingdom: Animalia
- Phylum: Arthropoda
- Class: Insecta
- Order: Hemiptera
- Suborder: Heteroptera
- Family: Miridae
- Subfamily: Phylinae
- Tribe: Phylini
- Genus: Plagiognathus
- Species: P. verticalis

Binomial name
- Plagiognathus verticalis (Uhler, 1894)

Synonyms
- Macrotylus verticalis Uhler, 1894; Plagiognathus fusciflavus Knight, 1929

Species of true bug

Plagiognathus verticalis is a species of plant bug in the family Miridae. It is found in Central America and North America.
