= Plagiognathus grandis =

Scientific classification
- Kingdom: Animalia
- Phylum: Arthropoda
- Class: Insecta
- Order: Hemiptera
- Suborder: Heteroptera
- Family: Miridae
- Subfamily: Phylinae
- Tribe: Phylini
- Genus: Plagiognathus
- Species: P. grandis

Binomial name
- Plagiognathus grandis Reuter, 1876

Synonyms
- Gerhardiella rubidus Poppius, 1911

Species of true bug

Plagiognathus grandis is a species of plant bug in the family Miridae.
