= Plagiognathus nigronitens =

Scientific classification
- Kingdom: Animalia
- Phylum: Arthropoda
- Class: Insecta
- Order: Hemiptera
- Suborder: Heteroptera
- Family: Miridae
- Subfamily: Phylinae
- Tribe: Phylini
- Genus: Plagiognathus
- Species: P. nigronitens

Binomial name
- Plagiognathus nigronitens Knight, 1923

Synonyms
- Plagiognathus nicholi Knight, 1964; Plagiognathus nigritibialis Knight, 1964

Species of true bug

Plagiognathus nigronitens is a species of plant bug in the family Miridae. It is found in North America.
