= Plagiognathus syrticolae =

Scientific classification
- Kingdom: Animalia
- Phylum: Arthropoda
- Class: Insecta
- Order: Hemiptera
- Suborder: Heteroptera
- Family: Miridae
- Subfamily: Phylinae
- Tribe: Phylini
- Genus: Plagiognathus
- Species: P. syrticolae

Binomial name
- Plagiognathus syrticolae Knight, 1941

Species of true bug

Plagiognathus syrticolae is a species of plant bug in the family Miridae. It was first described by H.H. Knight in 1941. This species is native to North America and has been recorded in several states including Illinois, New Hampshire, and New York.

== Description ==
Adults measure about 3.4–3.5 mm in length and 1.05–1.15 mm in width across the pronotum. They are characterized by a silvery, somewhat bristly dorsal surface and a pronotum that appears transversely wrinkled. The eyes are relatively small compared to congeners. Antennal segment I is entirely dark, while segment II is pale with a dark base and slightly longer than the head width. Legs are largely dark chestnut on the coxae, trochanters, and femora, whereas the tibiae are yellow with small basal spots.

== Host plants ==
P. syrticolae is strongly associated with the dune willow (Salix syrticola), and has been suggested to be a possible monophage (feeding primarily on this willow species).

== Distribution ==
The species has been collected in the northeastern and midwestern United States, including Illinois, New Hampshire, and New York. It is likely restricted to habitats where its host willow occurs, particularly sandy dune environments.

== Taxonomy ==
The genus Plagiognathus is one of the most speciose groups in the Miridae, with more than 120 described species worldwide.
