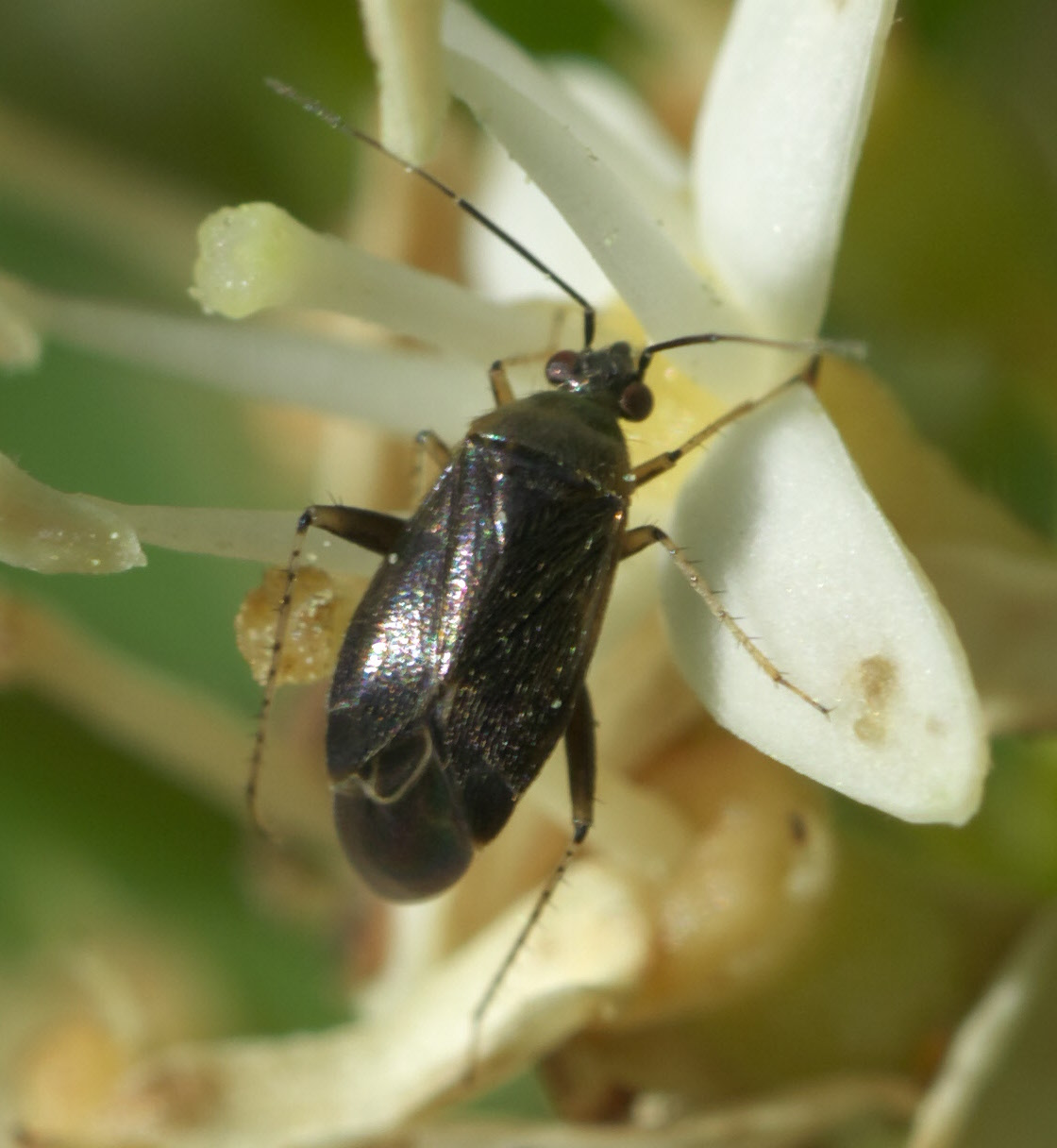

Scientific classification
- Kingdom: Animalia
- Phylum: Arthropoda
- Class: Insecta
- Order: Hemiptera
- Suborder: Heteroptera
- Family: Miridae
- Subfamily: Phylinae
- Tribe: Phylini
- Genus: Plagiognathus
- Species: P. politus

Binomial name
- Plagiognathus politus Uhler, 1895

= Plagiognathus politus =

Species of true bug

Plagiognathus politus is a species of plant bug in the family Miridae. It is found in North America.

== Subspecies ==
- Plagiognathus politus flaveolus Knight, 1923
- Plagiognathus politus politus Uhler, 1895
