= Plagiognathus brunneus =

Scientific classification
- Kingdom: Animalia
- Phylum: Arthropoda
- Class: Insecta
- Order: Hemiptera
- Suborder: Heteroptera
- Family: Miridae
- Subfamily: Phylinae
- Tribe: Phylini
- Genus: Plagiognathus
- Species: P. brunneus

Binomial name
- Plagiognathus brunneus (Provancher, 1872)

Synonyms
- Plagiognathus fraternus Uhler, 1895; Plagiognathus fuscotibialis Knight, 1964; Plagiognathus medicagus Arrand, 1958

Species of true bug

Plagiognathus brunneus is a species of plant bug in the family Miridae. It is found in North America.
