= Plagiognathus atricornis =

Scientific classification
- Kingdom: Animalia
- Phylum: Arthropoda
- Class: Insecta
- Order: Hemiptera
- Suborder: Heteroptera
- Family: Miridae
- Subfamily: Phylinae
- Tribe: Phylini
- Genus: Plagiognathus
- Species: P. atricornis

Binomial name
- Plagiognathus atricornis Knight, 1926

Species of true bug

Plagiognathus atricornis is a species of plant bug in the family Miridae.
