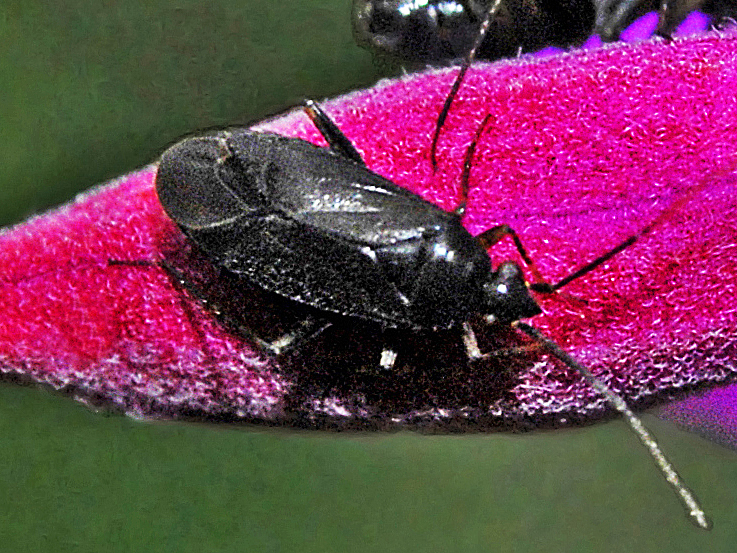
- Plagiognathus arbustorum. Adult

Scientific classification
- Domain: Eukaryota
- Kingdom: Animalia
- Phylum: Arthropoda
- Class: Insecta
- Order: Hemiptera
- Suborder: Heteroptera
- Family: Miridae
- Subfamily: Phylinae
- Tribe: Phylini
- Genus: Plagiognathus
- Species: P. arbustorum

Binomial name
- Plagiognathus arbustorum (Fabricius, 1794)

Synonyms
- Lygaeus arbustorum Fabricius, 1794

= Plagiognathus arbustorum =

Species of insect

Plagiognathus arbustorum is a species of insects in the family Miridae, the plant bugs.

== Distribution ==
This very common species is present in the Nearctic realm, in most of Europe and east to Siberia and Central Asia.

== Habitat ==
These mirids inhabit high-altitude herbaceous habitat, ruderal areas and even salt spots. In the Alps they can be found up to over 2000 meters above sea level.

== Description ==
Adults of Plagiognathus arbustorum can reach a length of 3.6–4.5 millimetres (0.14–0.18 in). These small mirids show a rather variable color, ranging from almost black to pale olive-green. Usually the head and the pronotum, the 1st and 2nd antennal segments and the margins of the hind femora are wholly dark. Forewings and pronotum are covered in dark hairs. The nymphs are green, with a black drawing on the legs.

== Biology ==
Adults of these mirids can be found from July to October. They are polyphagous, usually feeding on many different herbaceous plants, but especially on Urticaceae, Asteraceae, Lamiaceae, Fabaceae, Rosaceae and Apiaceae species.

Both adults and the nymphs prefer to suck on the buds, on flowers and immature fruits of their host plants. They feed occasionally on aphids and honeydew.

== Gallery ==
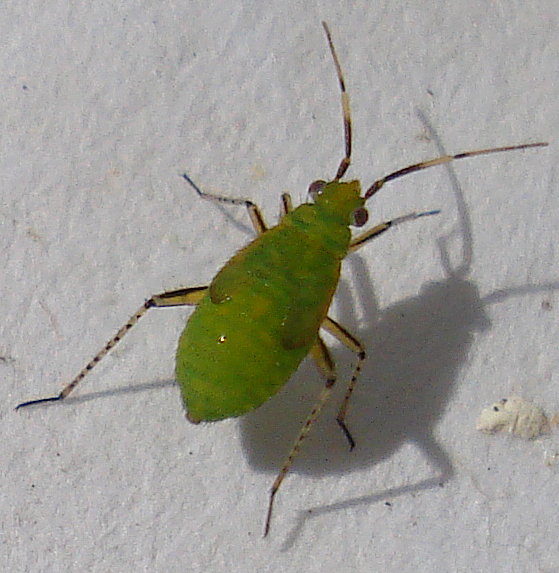
Nymph

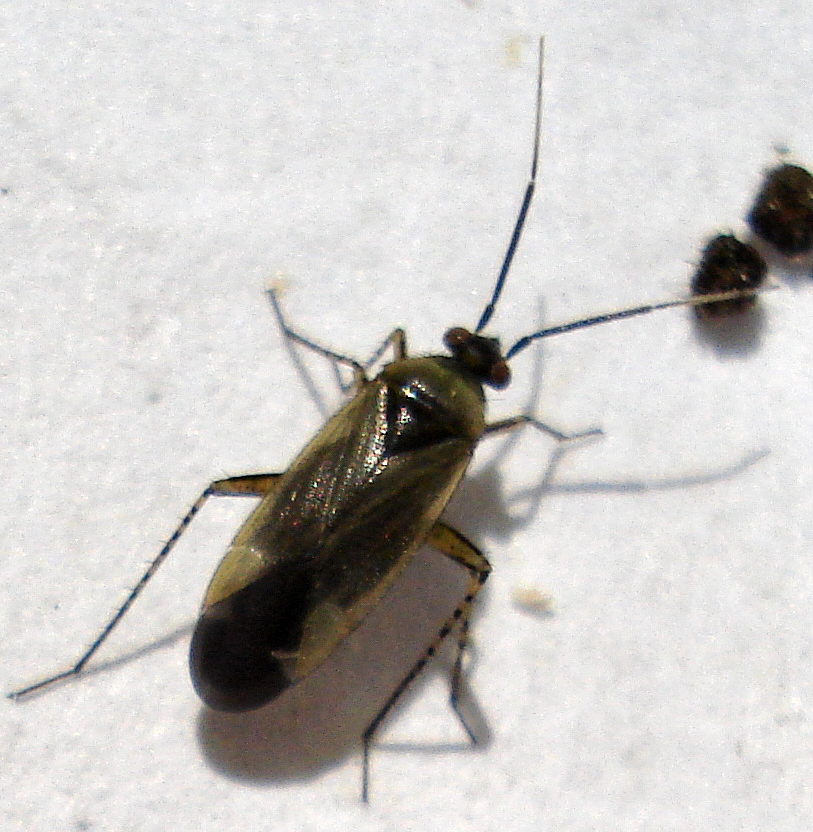
Adult

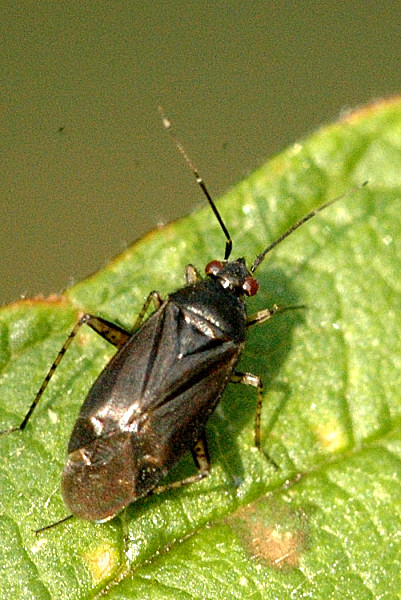
Adult

== Bibliography ==
- Schuh, Randall T. (2001) Revision of New World Plagiognathus Fieber, with comments on the Palearctic fauna and the description of a new genus (Heteroptera: Miridae: Phylinae), Bulletin of the American Museum of Natural History, no. 266
- Henry, Thomas J., and Richard C. Froeschner, eds. (1988), Catalog of the Heteroptera, or True Bugs, of Canada and the Continental United States
- Ekkehard Wachmann, Albert Melber, Jürgen Deckert: Wanzen. Band 2: Cimicomorpha: Microphysidae (Flechtenwanzen), Miridae (Weichwanzen) (= Die Tierwelt Deutschlands und der angrenzenden Meeresteile nach ihren Merkmalen und nach ihrer Lebensweise. 75. Teil). Goecke & Evers, Keltern 2006, ISBN 3-931374-57-2.
