= Plagiognathus maculipennis =

Scientific classification
- Kingdom: Animalia
- Phylum: Arthropoda
- Class: Insecta
- Order: Hemiptera
- Suborder: Heteroptera
- Family: Miridae
- Subfamily: Phylinae
- Tribe: Phylini
- Genus: Plagiognathus
- Species: P. maculipennis

Binomial name
- Plagiognathus maculipennis (Knight, 1923)

Synonyms
- Microphylellus fuscicornis Knight, 1923; Microphylellus maculipennis Knight, 1923

Species of true bug

Plagiognathus maculipennis is a species of plant bug in the family Miridae. It is found in Central America and North America.
