= Plagiognathus obscurus =

Scientific classification
- Kingdom: Animalia
- Phylum: Arthropoda
- Class: Insecta
- Order: Hemiptera
- Suborder: Heteroptera
- Family: Miridae
- Subfamily: Phylinae
- Tribe: Phylini
- Genus: Plagiognathus
- Species: P. obscurus

Binomial name
- Plagiognathus obscurus Uhler, 1872

Synonyms
- Plagiognathus annulatus cuneatus Knight, 1923; Plagiognathus annulatus nigrofemoratus Knight, 1923; Plagiognathus obscurus albocuneatus Knight, 1923

Species of true bug

Plagiognathus obscurus, the obscure plant bug, is a species of plant bug in the family Miridae. It is found in North America and South America.

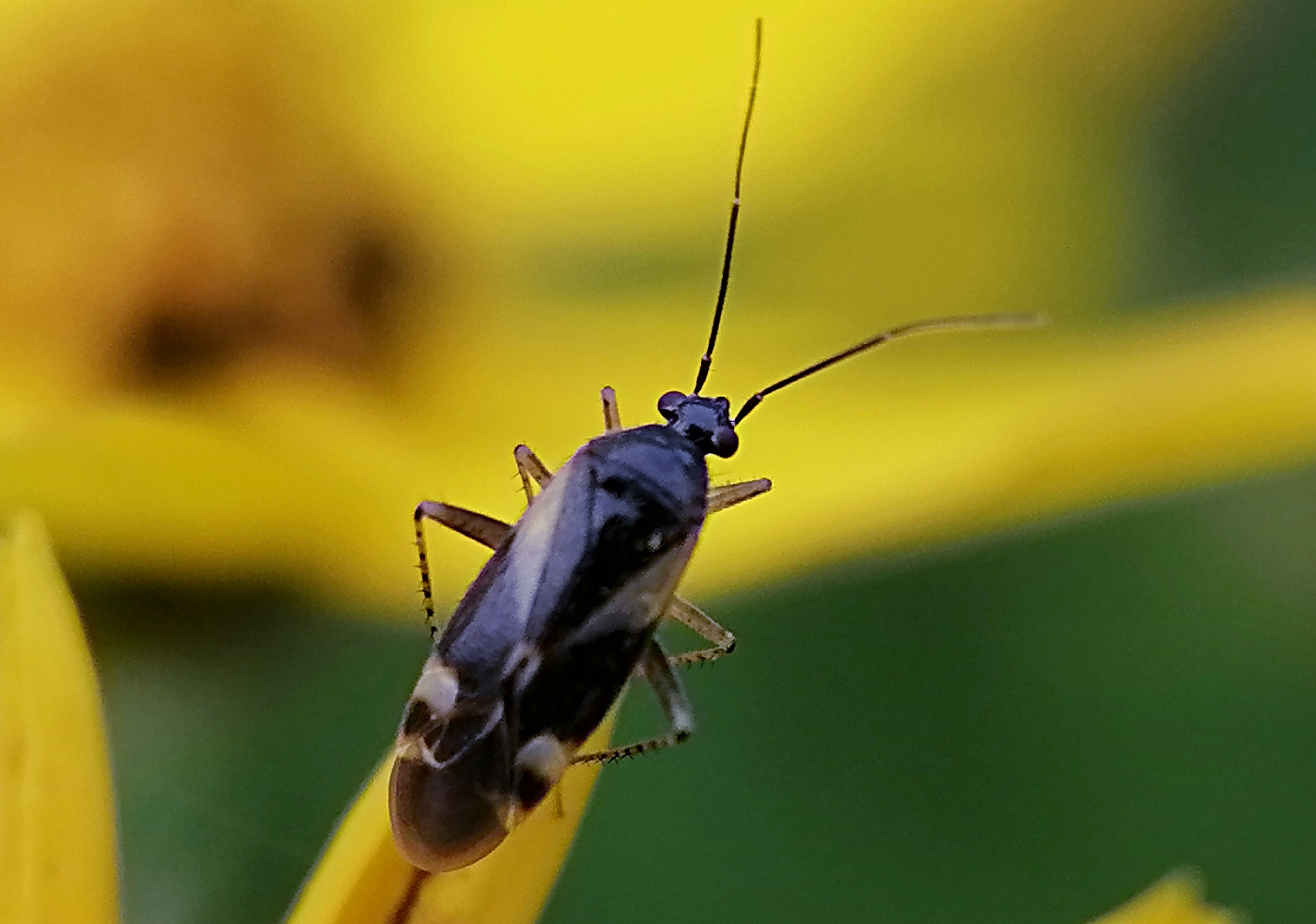
Plagiognathus obscurus - inat 145015675
