= Plagiognathus salicicola =

Scientific classification
- Kingdom: Animalia
- Phylum: Arthropoda
- Class: Insecta
- Order: Hemiptera
- Suborder: Heteroptera
- Family: Miridae
- Subfamily: Phylinae
- Tribe: Phylini
- Genus: Plagiognathus
- Species: P. salicicola

Binomial name
- Plagiognathus salicicola Knight, 1929

Synonyms
- Plagiognathus salicicola depallens Knight, 1929

Species of true bug

Plagiognathus salicicola is a species of plant bug in the family Miridae. It is found in North America.
