= Plagiognathus brevirostris =

Scientific classification
- Kingdom: Animalia
- Phylum: Arthropoda
- Class: Insecta
- Order: Hemiptera
- Suborder: Heteroptera
- Family: Miridae
- Subfamily: Phylinae
- Tribe: Phylini
- Genus: Plagiognathus
- Species: P. brevirostris

Binomial name
- Plagiognathus brevirostris Knight, 1923

Synonyms
- Plagiognathus intrusus Knight, 1926; Plagiognathus nigritus Knight, 1923

Species of true bug

Plagiognathus brevirostris is a species of plant bug in the family Miridae. It is found in North America.
