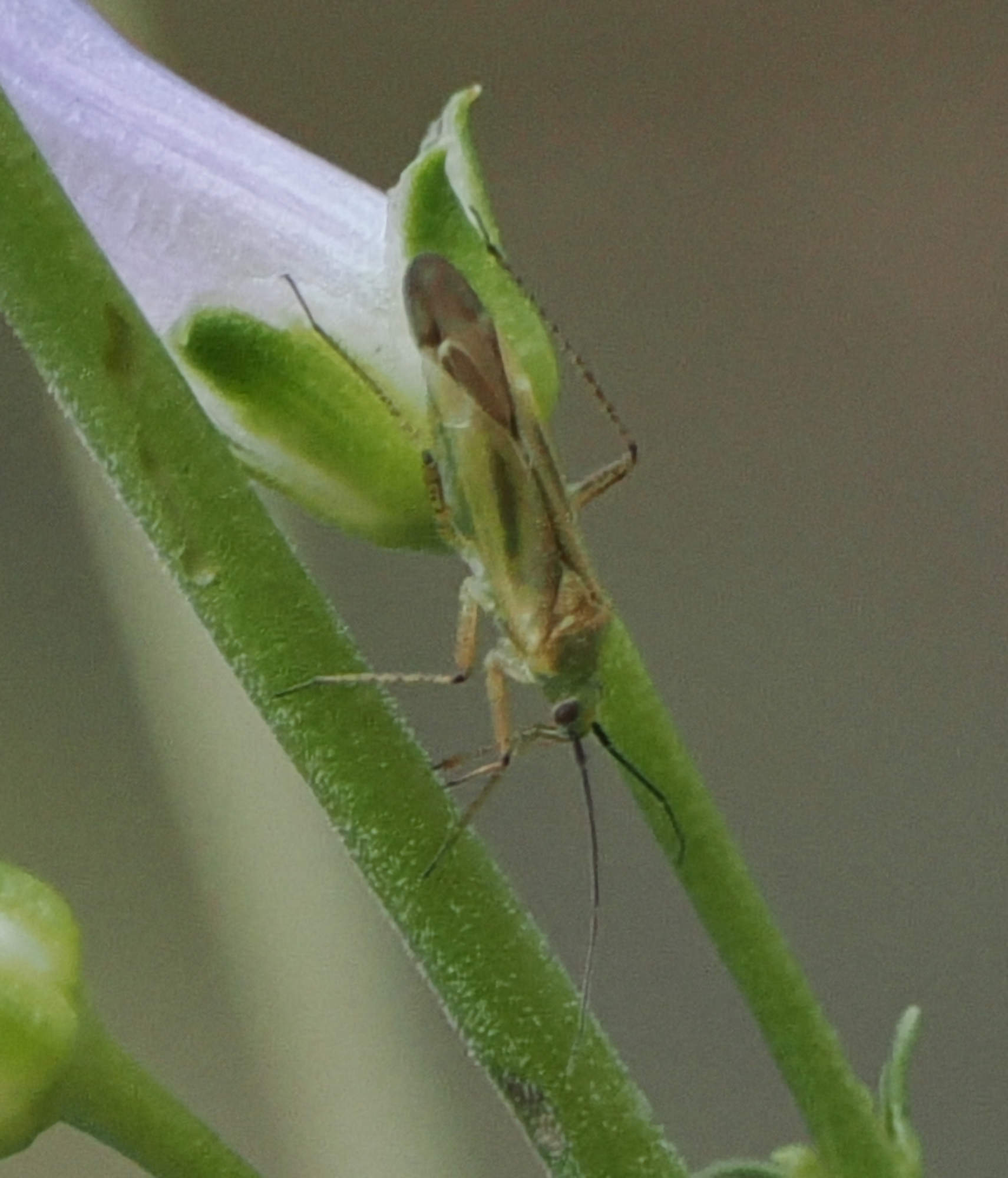
- Plagiognathus longipennis, Arizona

Scientific classification
- Kingdom: Animalia
- Phylum: Arthropoda
- Clade: Pancrustacea
- Class: Insecta
- Order: Hemiptera
- Suborder: Heteroptera
- Family: Miridae
- Subfamily: Phylinae
- Tribe: Phylini
- Genus: Plagiognathus
- Species: P. longipennis

Binomial name
- Plagiognathus longipennis (Uhler, 1895)

Synonyms
- Oncotylus longipennis Knight, 1925; Plagiognathus flavescens Uhler, 1895

= Plagiognathus longipennis =

Species of true bug

Plagiognathus longipennis is a species of the plant bug family Miridae. It is found in higher elevations of western North America.

This species is typically 5 to 6 millimeters in length, with a long, slender body.
