= Plagiognathus physocarpi =

Scientific classification
- Kingdom: Animalia
- Phylum: Arthropoda
- Class: Insecta
- Order: Hemiptera
- Suborder: Heteroptera
- Family: Miridae
- Subfamily: Phylinae
- Tribe: Phylini
- Genus: Plagiognathus
- Species: P. physocarpi

Binomial name
- Plagiognathus physocarpi (Henry, 1981)

Synonyms
- Psallus physocarpi Henry, 1981

Species of true bug

Plagiognathus physocarpi is a species of plant bug in the family Miridae. It is found in North America.
