= Plagiognathus blatchleyi =

Scientific classification
- Kingdom: Animalia
- Phylum: Arthropoda
- Class: Insecta
- Order: Hemiptera
- Suborder: Heteroptera
- Family: Miridae
- Subfamily: Phylinae
- Tribe: Phylini
- Genus: Plagiognathus
- Species: P. blatchleyi

Binomial name
- Plagiognathus blatchleyi Reuter, 1912

Species of true bug

Plagiognathus blatchleyi, or Blatchley's mirid, is a species of plant bug in the family Miridae. It is found in North America.
