= Sthenaropsidea =

Scientific classification
- Kingdom: Animalia
- Phylum: Arthropoda
- Clade: Pancrustacea
- Class: Insecta
- Order: Hemiptera
- Suborder: Heteroptera
- Family: Miridae
- Subfamily: Phylinae
- Tribe: Phylini
- Genus: Sthenaropsidea; Henry & Schuh, 2002
- Species: S. mcateei

Binomial name
- Sthenaropsidea mcateei (Knight, 1927)

Genus of true bugs

Sthenaropsidea is a genus of plant bugs in the family Miridae. There is one described species in Sthenaropsidea, S. mcateei.
