= Plesiodema =

Scientific classification
- Domain: Eukaryota
- Kingdom: Animalia
- Phylum: Arthropoda
- Class: Insecta
- Order: Hemiptera
- Suborder: Heteroptera
- Family: Miridae
- Subfamily: Phylinae
- Tribe: Phylini
- Subtribe: Oncotylina
- Genus: Plesiodema; Reuter, 1875

Genus of insects

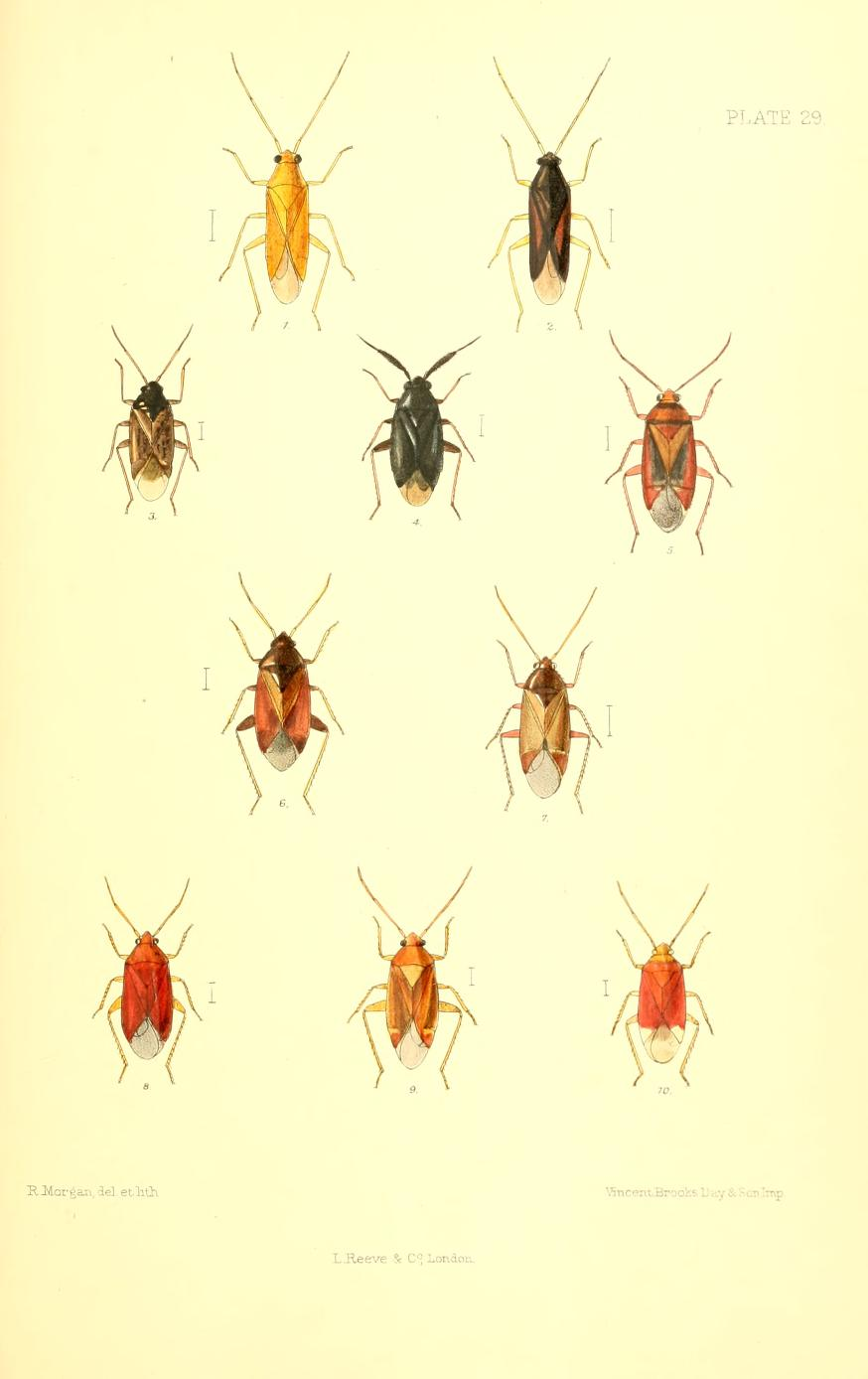

Plesiodema is a genus of true bugs belonging to the family Miridae.

The species of this genus are found in Europe and Northern America.

Species:

- Plesiodema abiesicolus (Schwartz & Schuh, 1999)
- Plesiodema gotohi Yasunaga, 2003
- Plesiodema oblonga Wagner, 1968
- Plesiodema pinetella (Zetterstedt, 1828)
- Plesiodema pinicolus (Schwartz & Schuh, 1999)
- Plesiodema polhemi (Schwartz & Schuh, 1999)
- Plesiodema sericeum Knight, 1929
- Plesiodema stlaniki Kerzhner, 1979
