= Plagiognathus tsugae =

Scientific classification
- Domain: Eukaryota
- Kingdom: Animalia
- Phylum: Arthropoda
- Class: Insecta
- Order: Hemiptera
- Suborder: Heteroptera
- Family: Miridae
- Genus: Plagiognathus
- Species: P. tsugae

Binomial name
- Plagiognathus tsugae (Knight, 1923)

Synonyms
- Microphylellus tsugae Knight, 1923

Species of true bug

Plagiognathus tsugae is a species of plant bugs in the family Miridae. It is found in North America.
