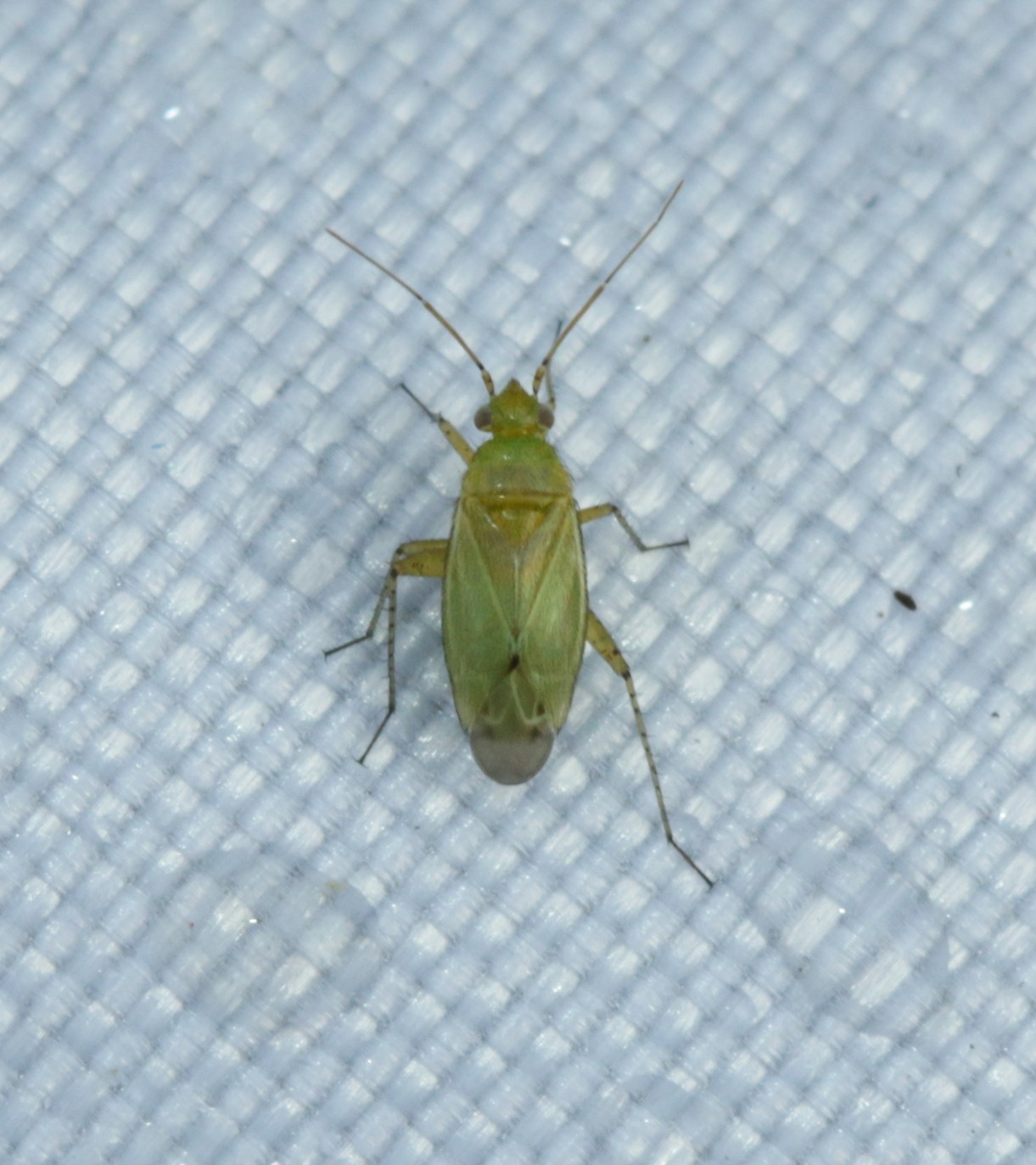

Scientific classification
- Kingdom: Animalia
- Phylum: Arthropoda
- Class: Insecta
- Order: Hemiptera
- Suborder: Heteroptera
- Family: Miridae
- Genus: Plagiognathus
- Species: P. chrysanthemi

Binomial name
- Plagiognathus chrysanthemi (Wolff, 1804)

= Plagiognathus chrysanthemi =

Species of true bug

Plagiognathus chrysanthemi, the trefoil plant bug, is a species of plant bug in the family Miridae. It is found across the entire Palearctic and in North America as an adventive.

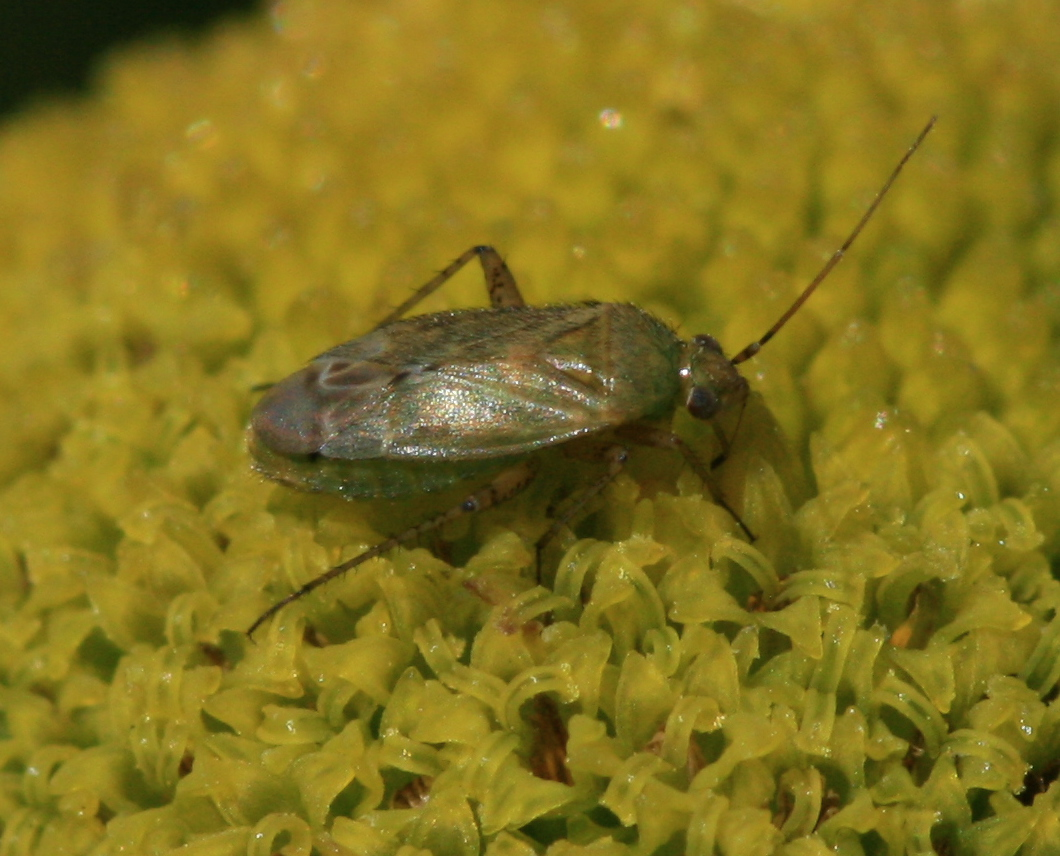
Trefoil plant bug, Plagiognathus chrysanthemi

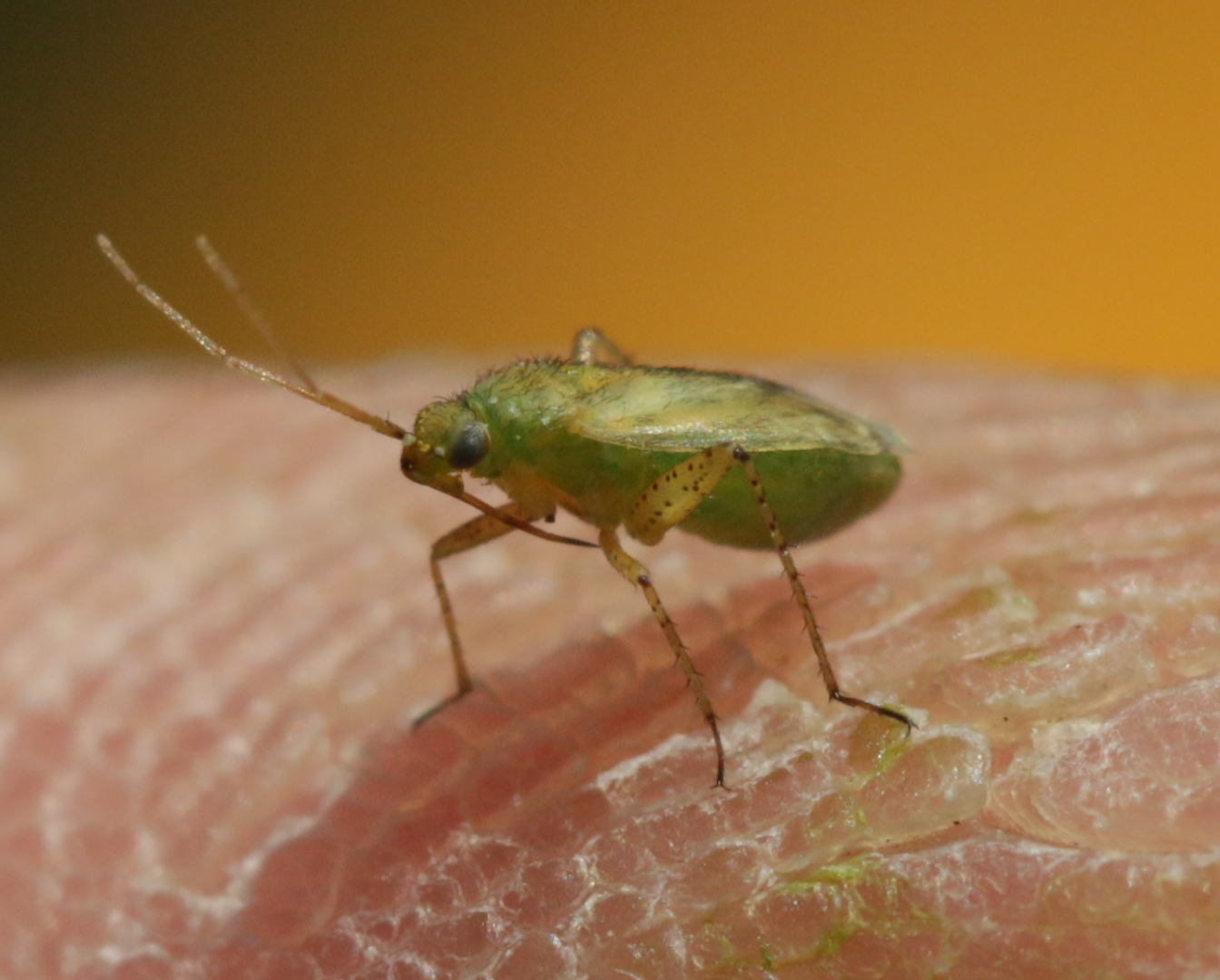
Trefoil plant bug, Plagiognathus chrysanthemi

Plagiognathus chrysanthemi sucks on herbaceous plants and it is very polyphagous feeding on many different host plants. These include species from different plant families, including daisy family (Asteraceae) and legume (Fabaceae). The bugs suck especially on the immature reproductive organs of the plants.
