= Tinicephalus =

Scientific classification
- Domain: Eukaryota
- Kingdom: Animalia
- Phylum: Arthropoda
- Class: Insecta
- Order: Hemiptera
- Suborder: Heteroptera
- Family: Miridae
- Subfamily: Phylinae
- Tribe: Phylini
- Genus: Tinicephalus; Fieber, 1858

Synonyms
- Cephalotenes Marshall, 1868; Cephalotonus Marshall, 1868

Genus of true bugs

Tinicephalus is a genus of mostly European capsid bugs in the tribe Phylini, erected by Franz Xaver Fieber in 1858. The species Tinicephalus hortulanus is recorded from northern Europe including the British Isles.

== Species ==
According to BioLib the following are included:

subgenus Lavendulaephylus Wagner, 1972

1. Tinicephalus rubiginosus Fieber, 1861

subgenus Tinicephalus Fieber, 1858

1. Tinicephalus croceus Wagner, 1969
2. Tinicephalus dentifer Linnavuori, 1965
3. Tinicephalus discrepans Fieber, 1858
4. Tinicephalus hortulanus (Meyer-Dür, 1843)
5. Tinicephalus indistinctus Wagner, 1962
6. Tinicephalus macciae Lindberg, 1934
7. Tinicephalus nigropilosus Wagner, 1977
8. Tinicephalus picticornis Wagner, 1966
9. Tinicephalus rubropictus Wagner, 1972
10. Tinicephalus varensis Wagner, 1964
11. Tinicephalus vicarius Linnavuori, 1984

Unplaced taxa

1. Tinicephalus atricornis (Wagner, 1965)
2. Tinicephalus streitoi Matocq, 2007
