= Psallodema =

Scientific classification
- Domain: Eukaryota
- Kingdom: Animalia
- Phylum: Arthropoda
- Class: Insecta
- Order: Hemiptera
- Suborder: Heteroptera
- Family: Miridae
- Subfamily: Phylinae
- Tribe: Phylini
- Genus: Psallodema; V.G. Putshkov, 1970

Genus of true bugs

Psallodema is a genus of mostly European capsid bugs in the tribe Phylini, erected by V.G. Putshkov in 1970. The species Psallodema fieberi is recorded from northern Europe including the British Isles.

== Species ==
According to BioLib the following are included:

1. Psallodema fieberi (Fieber, 1864) - synonym Asciodema fieberi (Fieber, 1864)
2. Psallodema intergerina V.G. Putshkov, 1970
3. Psallodema kasja Drapolyuk, 1987
4. Psallodema ulmicola V.G. Putshkov, 1970

== See also ==
- List of heteropteran bugs recorded in Britain
