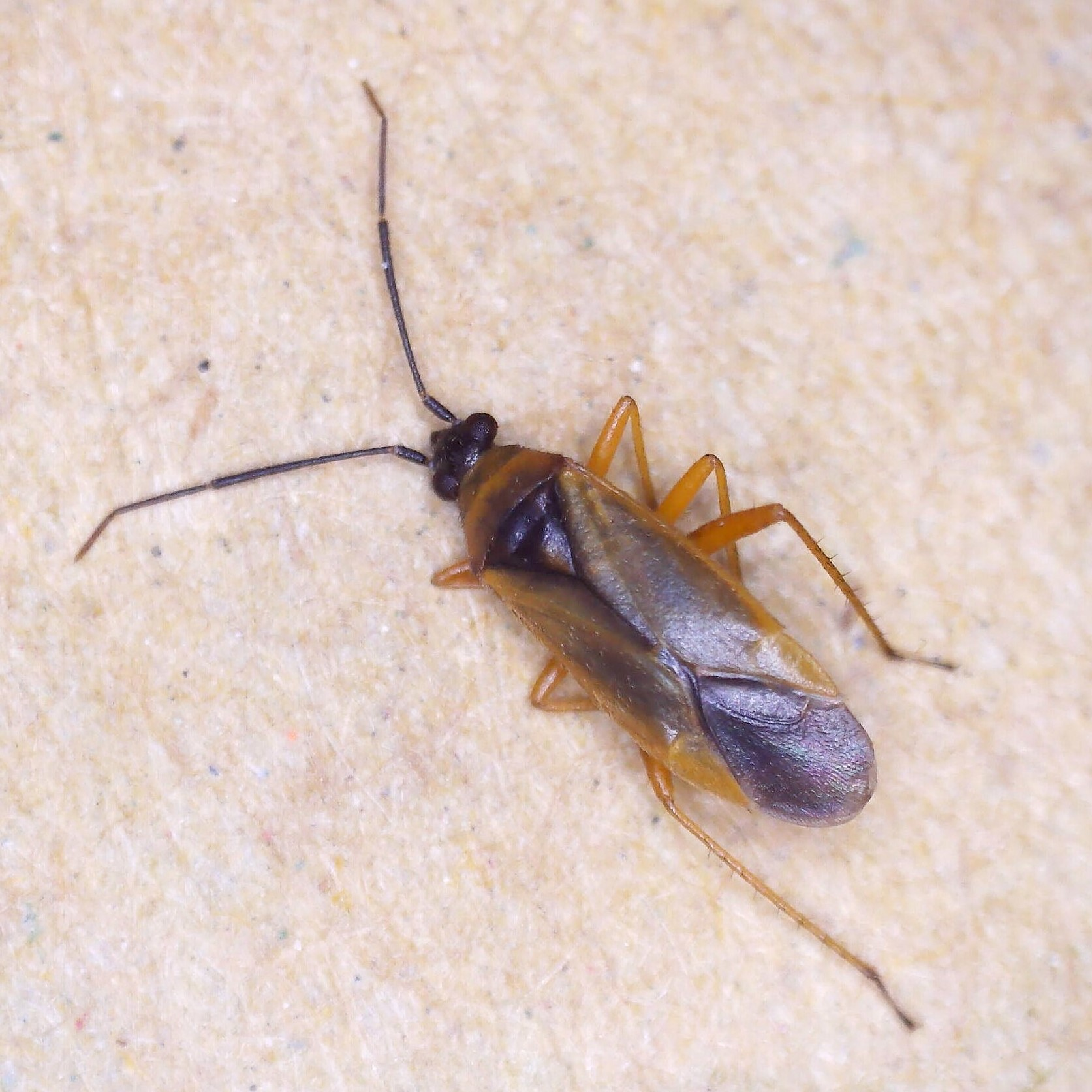

Scientific classification
- Kingdom: Animalia
- Phylum: Arthropoda
- Class: Insecta
- Order: Hemiptera
- Suborder: Heteroptera
- Family: Miridae
- Genus: Brachyarthrum; Fieber, 1858
- Species: B. limitatum

Binomial name
- Brachyarthrum limitatum Fieber, 1858

= Brachyarthrum =

Brachyarthrum limitatum

Genus of true bugs

Brachyarthrum is a genus of true bugs belonging to the family Miridae. It is monotypic, being represented by the single species Brachyarthrum limitatum which is found in Europe.
