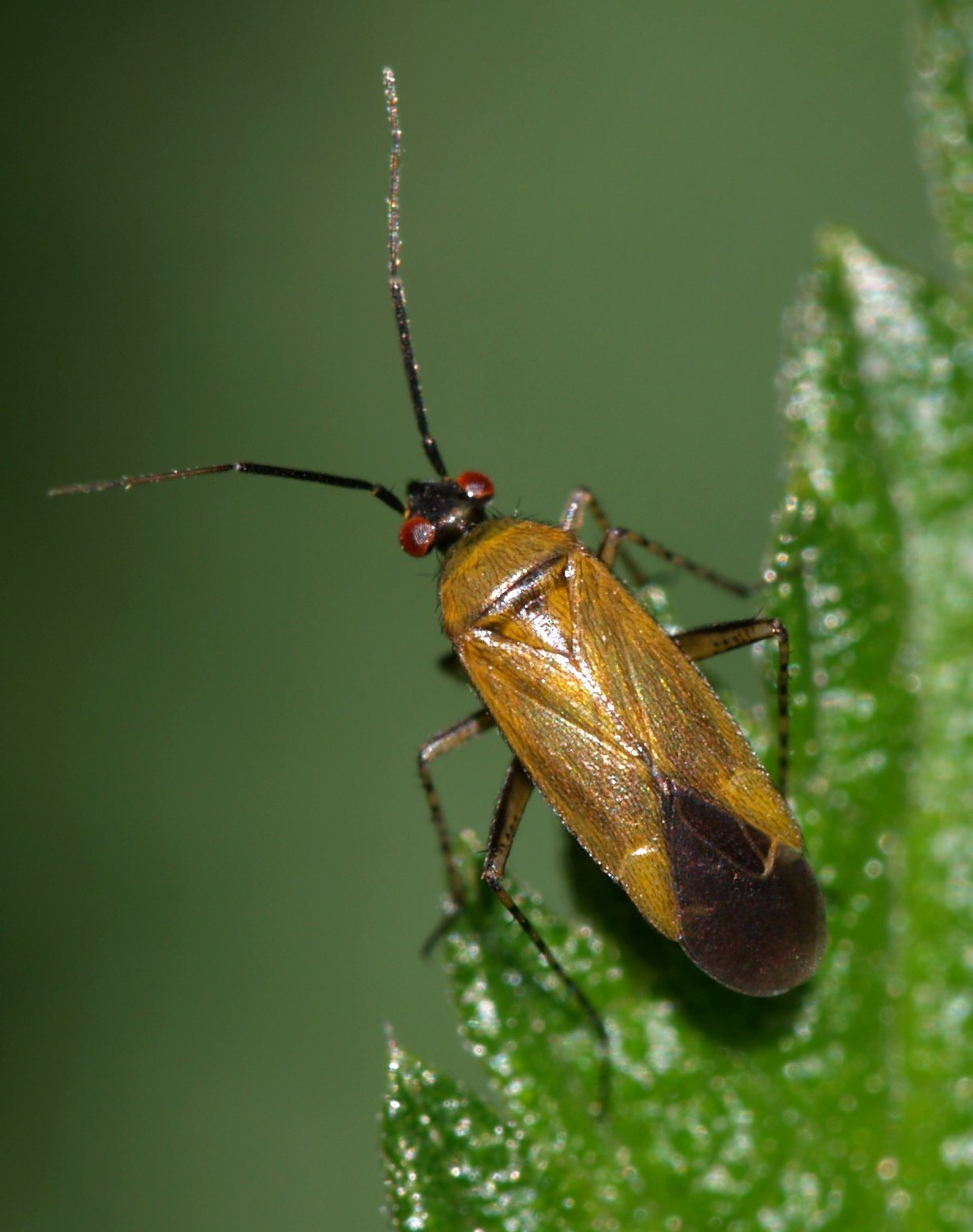
- Plagiognathus arbustorum, Germany

Scientific classification
- Kingdom: Animalia
- Phylum: Arthropoda
- Clade: Pancrustacea
- Class: Insecta
- Order: Hemiptera
- Suborder: Heteroptera
- Family: Miridae
- Subfamily: Phylinae
- Tribe: Phylini
- Genus: Plagiognathus; Fieber, 1858

Synonyms
- Chaetophylidea Knight, 1968; Gerhardiella Poppius, 1911; Leptotylus Van Duzee, 1916; Microphylellus Reuter, 1909; Poliopterus Wagner, 1949

= Plagiognathus =

Genus of true bugs

Plagiognathus is a genus of jumping tree bugs in the family Miridae. There are more than 120 species described in the genus Plagiognathus.

== Plagiognathus species ==
These 123 species belong to the genus Plagiognathus:

- Plagiognathus alashanensis Qi & Nonnaizab, 1993 (China: Inner Mongolia)
- Plagiognathus albatus (Van Duzee, 1915) (Eastern North America)
- Plagiognathus albifacies Knight, 1927 (USA, Canada)
- Plagiognathus alboradialis Knight, 1923 (temperate North America)
- Plagiognathus albus Reuter, 1894 (Spain)
- Plagiognathus alnicenatus (Knight, 1923) (northeast North America)
- Plagiognathus alpinus (Van Duzee, 1916) (California)
- Plagiognathus amorphae (Knight, 1930) (eastern North America)
- Plagiognathus amurensis Reuter, 1883 (China, Uganda, South Korea, Siberia)
- Plagiognathus annulatus Uhler, 1895 (USA)
- Plagiognathus aquilinus Schuh, 2001 (USA: Colorado, New Mexico)
- Plagiognathus arbustorum (Fabricius, 1794) (North America, Europe, Asia)
- Plagiognathus astericola (Knight, 1930) (USA)
- Plagiognathus atricornis Knight, 1926 (USA)
- Plagiognathus biobioensis (Carvalho, 1984) (Chile)
- Plagiognathus bipunctatus Reuter, 1883 (Europe, Asia)
- Plagiognathus blatchleyi Reuter, 1912 (eastern North America)
- Plagiognathus brevicornis (Knight, 1929) (USA: Arizona)
- Plagiognathus brevirostris Knight, 1923 (eastern North America)
- Plagiognathus brunneus (Provancher, 1872) (North America)
- Plagiognathus chrysanthemi (Wolff, 1804) (Asia, Europe, North America)
- Plagiognathus cibbetsi Schuh, 2001 (USA: California, Nevada)
- Plagiognathus collaris (Matsumura, 1911) (eastern Asia)
- Plagiognathus concoloris Schuh, 2001 (USA: California, Oregon)
- Plagiognathus confusus Reuter, 1909 (USA: Nevada)
- Plagiognathus cornicola Knight, 1923 (eastern North America)
- Plagiognathus crocinus Knight, 1927 (USA: Virginia)
- Plagiognathus davisi Knight, 1923 (North America)
- Plagiognathus delicatus (Uhler, 1887) (eastern North America)
- Plagiognathus dimorphus Schuh, 2001 (western North America)
- Plagiognathus dispar Knight, 1923 (eastern North America)
- Plagiognathus emarginatae Schuh, 2001 (USA: California)
- Plagiognathus fenderi Schuh, 2001 (western United States)
- Plagiognathus flavicornis Knight, 1923 (northeast North America)
- Plagiognathus flavidus Knight, 1929 (North America)
- Plagiognathus flavipes (Provancher, 1872) (northeast North America)
- Plagiognathus flavoscutellatus Knight, 1923 (northeast North America)
- Plagiognathus flavus Knight, 1964 (USA: Arizona)
- Plagiognathus fulvaceus Knight, 1964 (western USA)
- Plagiognathus fulvidus Knight, 1923 (northeastern USA)
- Plagiognathus fulvipennis (Kirschbaum, 1856) (Europe, Asia)
- Plagiognathus fusciloris Reuter, 1878 (France: Corsica)
- Plagiognathus fuscipes Knight, 1929 (northwest North America)
- Plagiognathus fuscosus (Provancher, 1872) (North America)
- Plagiognathus grandis Reuter, 1876 (Mexico, USA)
- Plagiognathus guttatipes (Uhler, 1895) (Canada, USA)
- Plagiognathus hallucinatus Schuh, 2001 (USA: Oregon)
- Plagiognathus knighti Kerzhner & Schuh, 1998
- Plagiognathus laricicola Knight, 1923 (Canada, USA)
- Plagiognathus lattini Schuh, 2001 (USA: Oregon)
- Plagiognathus lineatus Van Duzee, 1917 (Canada, USA)
- Plagiognathus lividellus Kerzhner, 1979 (eastern Russia)
- Plagiognathus longipennis (Uhler, 1895) (USA)
- Plagiognathus longirostris (Knight, 1923) (Canada, USA)
- Plagiognathus lonierae Schuh, 2001 (USA: California)
- Plagiognathus louisianus Schuh, 2001 (USA: Arizona)
- Plagiognathus luteus Knight, 1929 (USA: Arizona, California)
- Plagiognathus maculipennis (Knight, 1923) (North America)
- Plagiognathus maculosus Zhao, 1996
- Plagiognathus marivanensis Linnavuori, 2010 (central Asia)
- Plagiognathus melliferae Schuh, 2001 (USA: California)
- Plagiognathus mexicanus Schuh, 2001 (Baja California)
- Plagiognathus mineus (Knight, 1929) (USA: Florida)
- Plagiognathus minuendus (Knight, 1927) (USA: Maryland)
- Plagiognathus modestus (Reuter, 1912) (eastern North America)
- Plagiognathus moerens Reuter, 1909 (USA)
- Plagiognathus monardellae Schuh, 2001 (USA: California)
- Plagiognathus morrisoni (Knight, 1923) (Canada, USA)
- Plagiognathus mundus Van Duzee, 1917 (USA)
- Plagiognathus negundinis Knight, 1929 (Canada, USA)
- Plagiognathus nigronitens Knight, 1923 (Canada, USA)
- Plagiognathus nokhurensis V. Putshkov, 1976 (Turkmenistan)
- Plagiognathus notodysmicos Schuh, 2001 (USA: Arizona, Colorado, New Mexico)
- Plagiognathus obscuriceps (Stal, 1858) (Siberia)
- Plagiognathus obscurus Uhler, 1872 (obscure plant bug) (Western Hemisphere)
- Plagiognathus occipitalis Reuter, 1908 (Chile)
- Plagiognathus olivaceus Reuter, 1880 (Spain)
- Plagiognathus ozgurkocaki Çerçi, 2022
- Plagiognathus pallidus Reuter, 1900 (Algeria)
- Plagiognathus paramundus Schuh, 2001 (USA: California, Nevada, Oregon)
- Plagiognathus parshleyi (Knight, 1923) (Canada, northern USA)
- Plagiognathus pemptos Schuh, 2001 (North America)
- Plagiognathus phaceliae Schuh, 2001 (USA: California)
- Plagiognathus phorodendronae Knight, 1929
- Plagiognathus physocarpi (T. Henry, 1981) (northeastern North America)
- Plagiognathus piceicola Schuh, 2001 (USA: Arizona, New Mexico)
- Plagiognathus pini Vinokurov, 1978 (eastern Russia)
- Plagiognathus plagiathus Reuter, 1876 (Italy)
- Plagiognathus polhemorum Schuh, 2001 (USA: Colorado)
- Plagiognathus politus Uhler, 1895 (Canada, USA)
- Plagiognathus punctatipes Knight, 1923 (USA: Colorado)
- Plagiognathus raphani Wagner, 1963 (Lebanon)
- Plagiognathus reinhardi Johnston, 1935 (USA: Texas)
- Plagiognathus repetitus Knight, 1923 (Canada, USA)
- Plagiognathus reuterellus Schuh, 2001 (Algeria; Corsica)
- Plagiognathus ribesi Kelton, 1982 (Canada, USA)
- Plagiognathus rideri Schuh, 2001 (USA)
- Plagiognathus rileyi Schuh, 2001 (USA: Arkansas, Missouri, Oklahoma)
- Plagiognathus rosicola Knight, 1923 (Canada, USA)
- Plagiognathus rosicoloides Schuh, 2001 (northwestern North America)
- Plagiognathus salicicola Knight, 1929 (western Canada, northwest USA)
- Plagiognathus salviae Knight, 1968 (USA: California, Nevada)
- Plagiognathus schaffneri Schuh, 2001 (USA: Texas)
- Plagiognathus servadeii Wagner, 1972 (Italy)
- Plagiognathus shepherdiae Knight, 1929 (USA: Colorado, Montana)
- Plagiognathus shoshonea Knight, 1964 (Canada, USA)
- Plagiognathus stitti Knight, 1964 (USA: Arizona)
- Plagiognathus subovatus Knight, 1929 (USA)
- Plagiognathus suffuscipennis Knight, 1923 (Canada, USA)
- Plagiognathus syrticolae Knight, 1941 (USA: Illinois, New Hampshire, New York)
- Plagiognathus tamaninii Carapezza, 1998 (Cyprus)
- Plagiognathus tenellus Knight, 1929 (USA: Arizona, Colorado)
- Plagiognathus texanus Schuh, 2001 (USA: Georgia, Texas)
- Plagiognathus tinctus Knight, 1923 (Canada, USA)
- Plagiognathus tsugae (Knight, 1923) (Canada, USA)
- Plagiognathus tumidifrons (Knight, 1923) (Canada, USA)
- Plagiognathus urticae Knight, 1964 (USA: California)
- Plagiognathus vaulogeri Reuter, 1895 (Algeria)
- Plagiognathus verticalis (Uhler, 1894) (Baja California, western USA)
- Plagiognathus vitellinus (Scholtz, 1847) (North America, Europe, Asia)
- Plagiognathus viticola (Johnston, 1935) (USA)
- Plagiognathus yomogi Miyamoto, 1969 (Japan, eastern Russia, South Korea)
- Plagiognathus zuvandiensis V. Putshkov, 1978 (Transcaucasia)
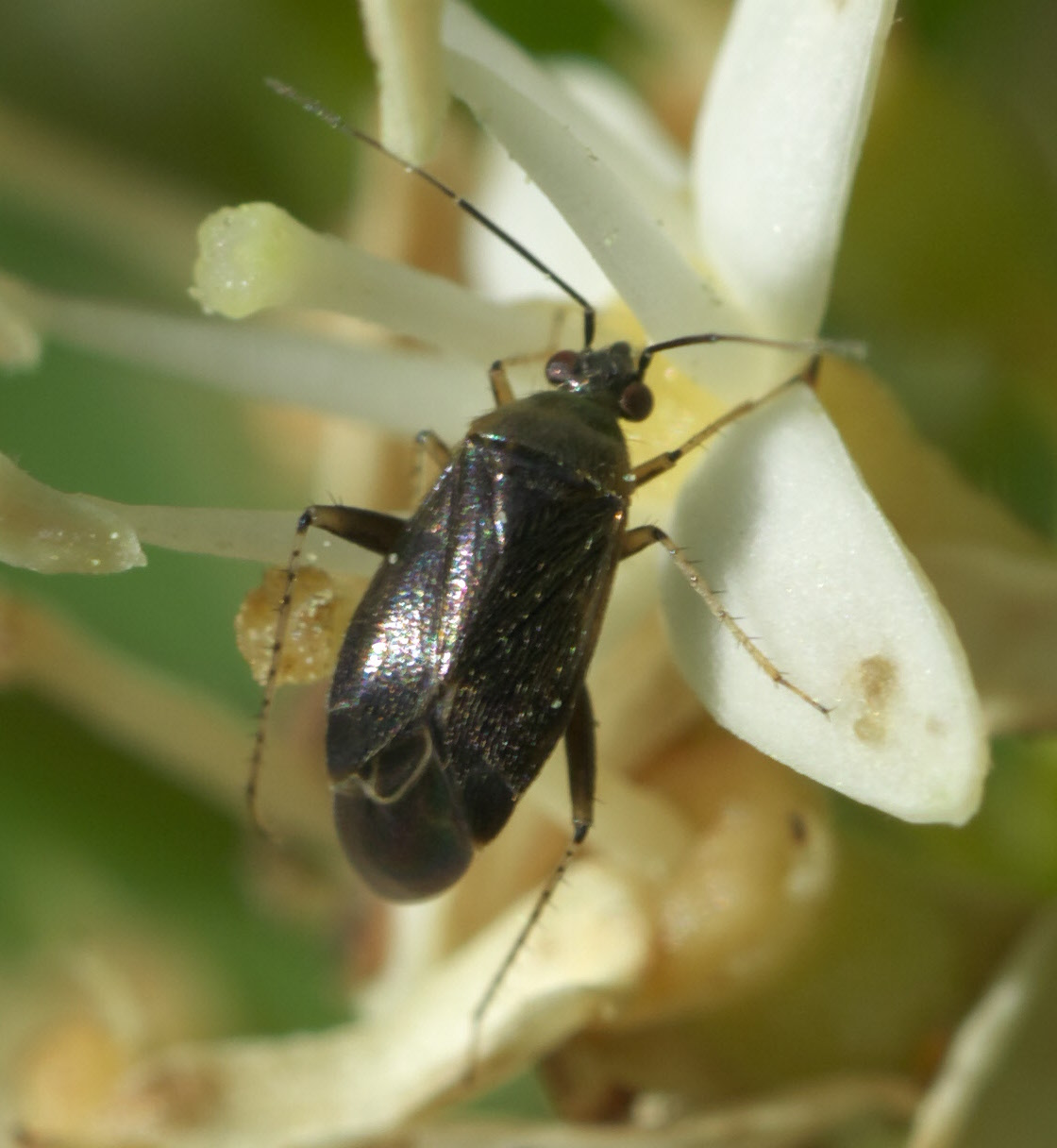
Plagiognathus politus

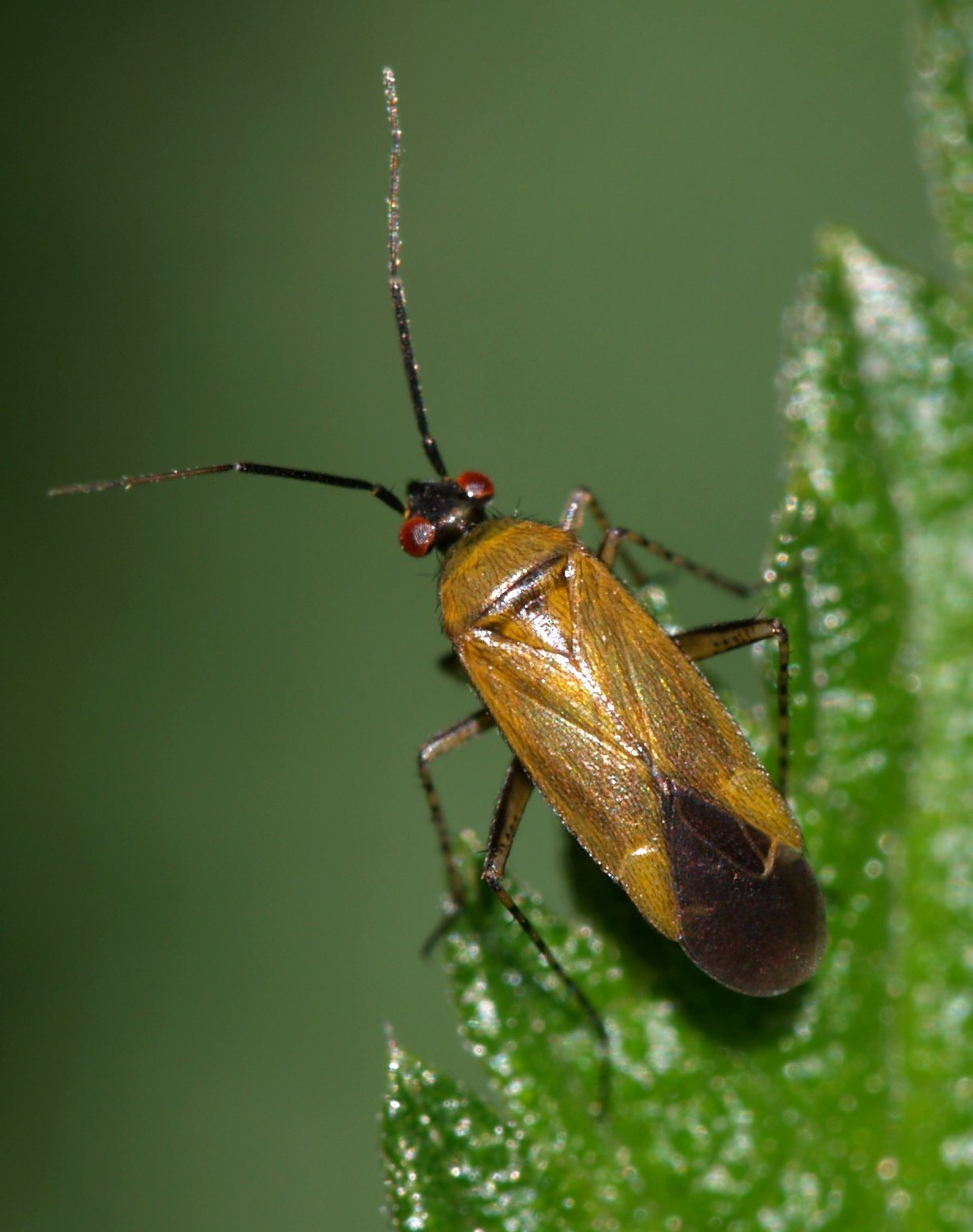
Plagiognathus arbustorum, Germany

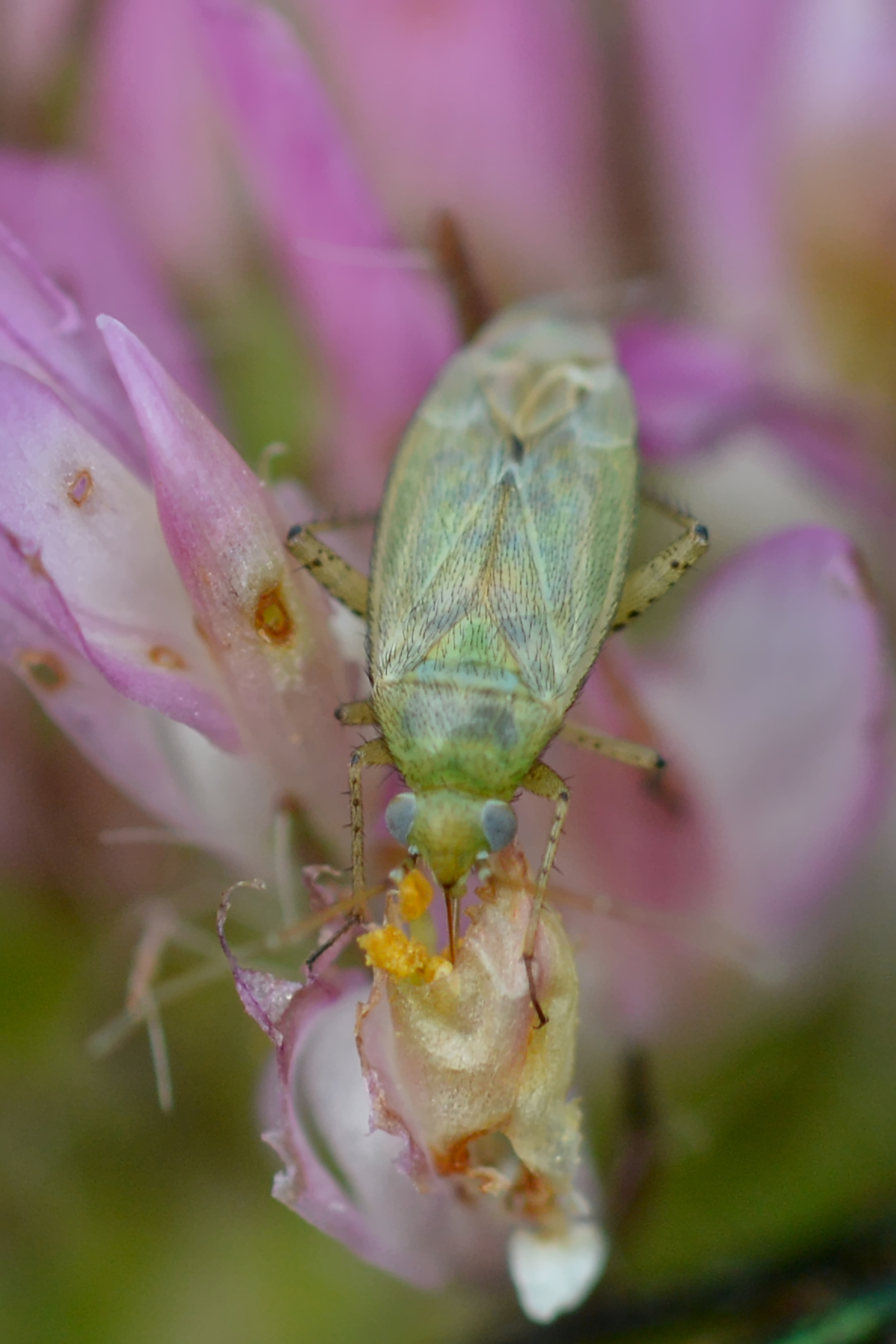
Plagiognathus chrysanthemi, Canada

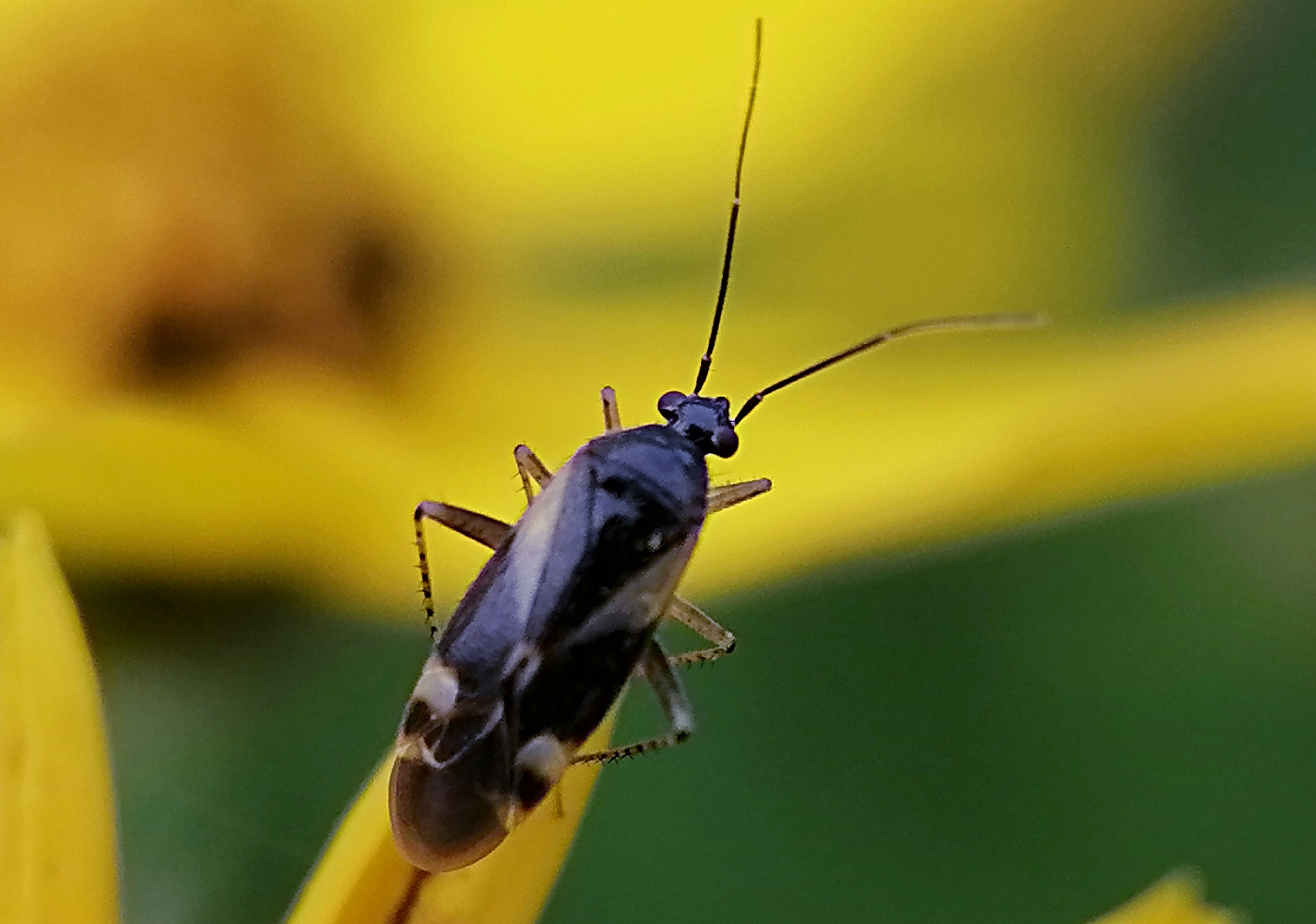
Plagiognathus obscurus, Canada

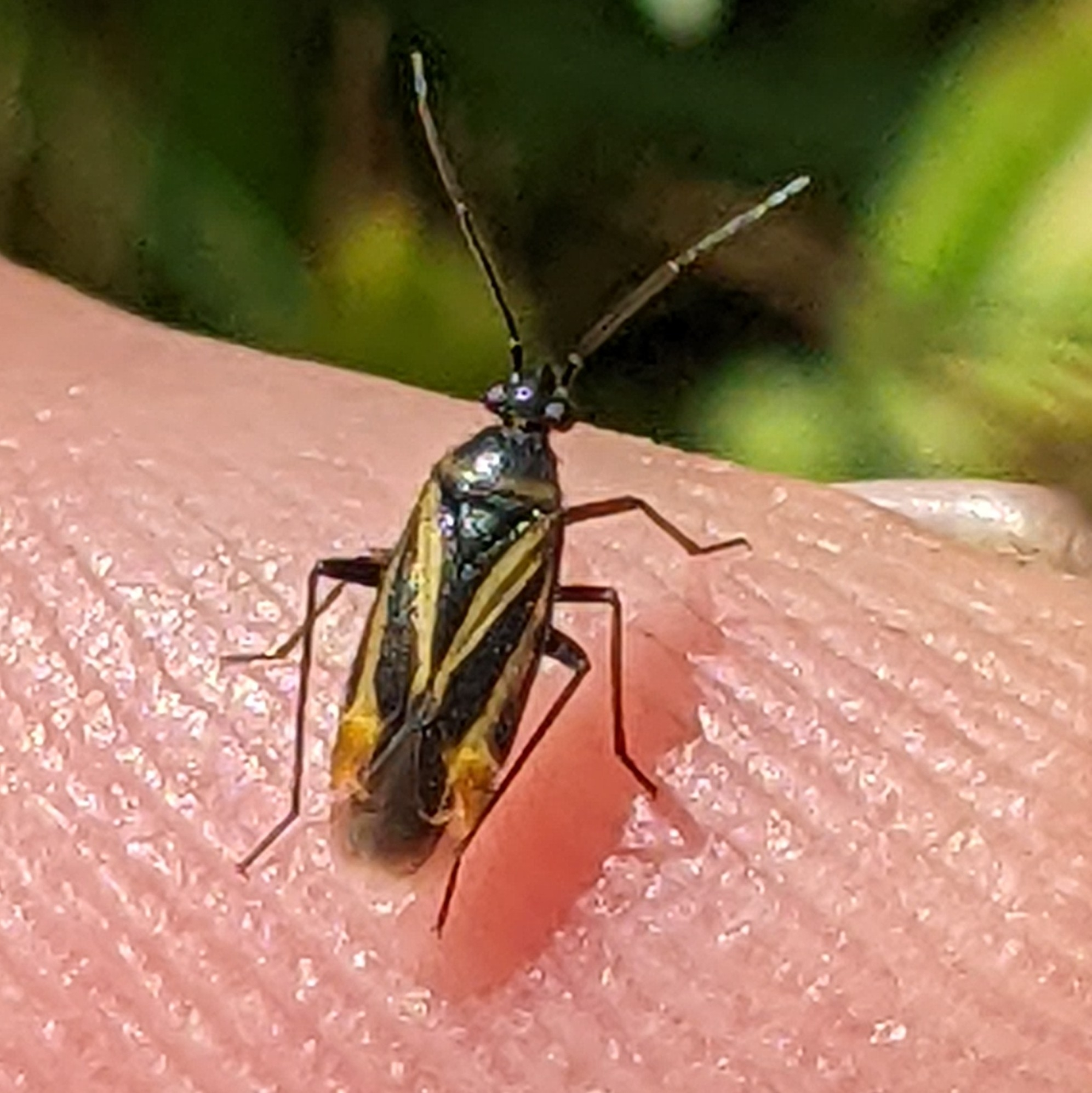
Plagiognathus moerens, California

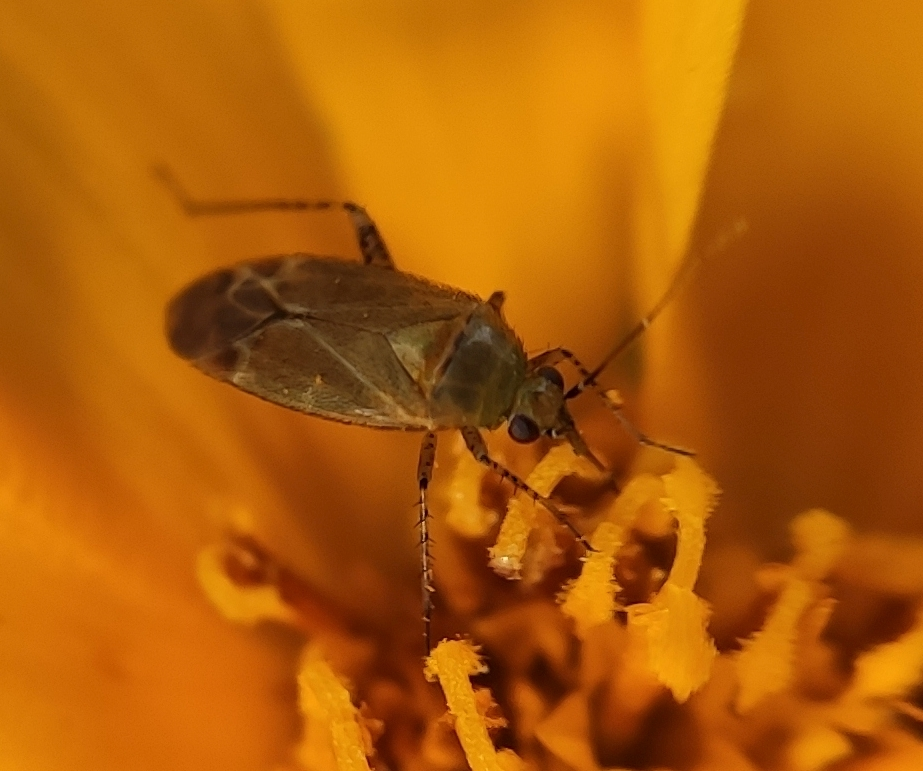
Plagiognathus fulvipennis, Poland

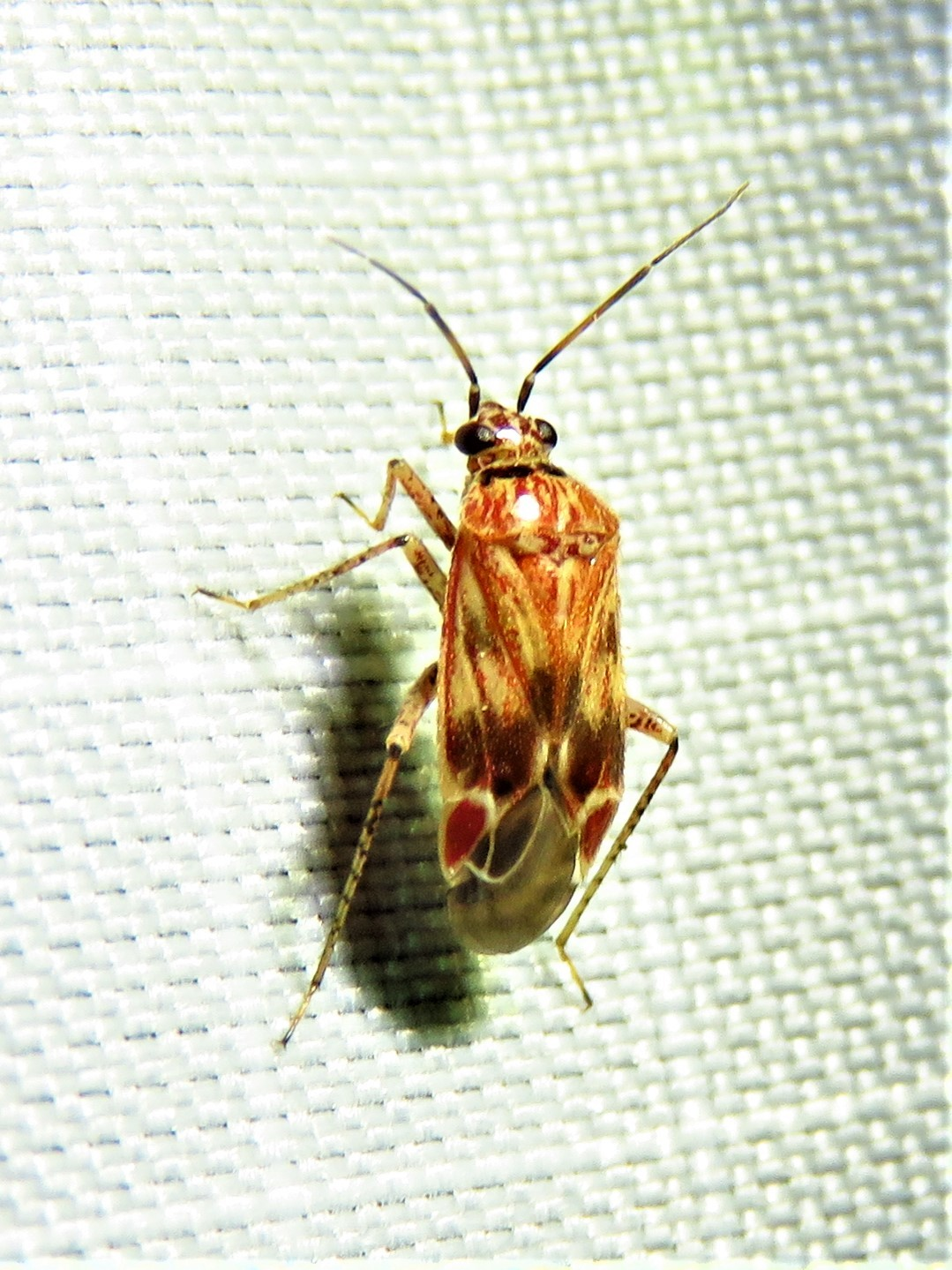
Plagiognathus grandis, Texas

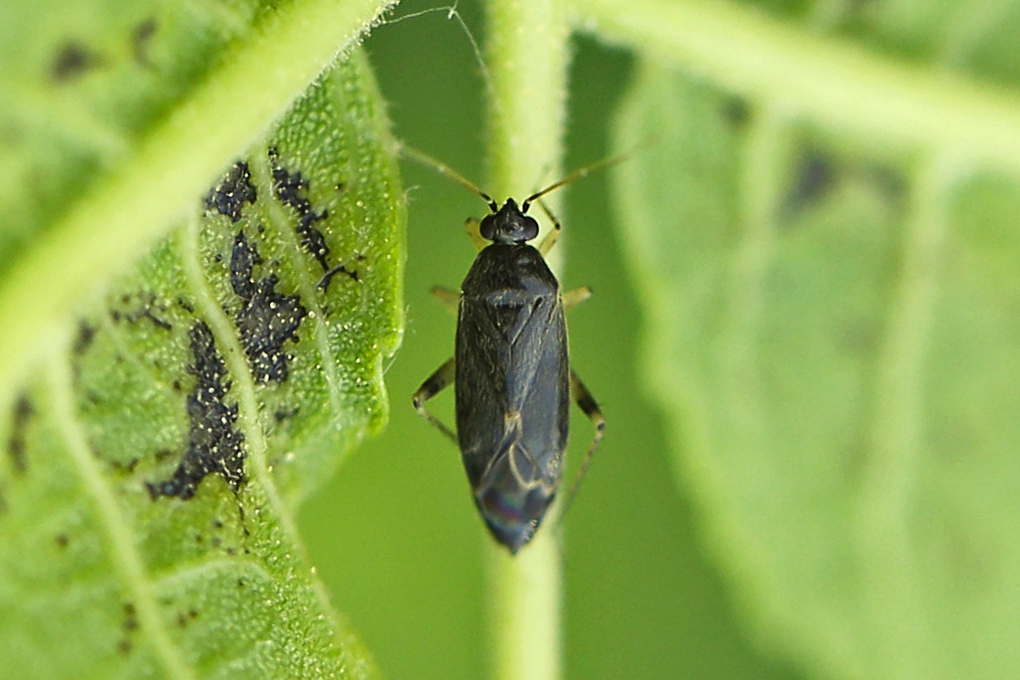
Plagiognathus albatus, Pennsylvania

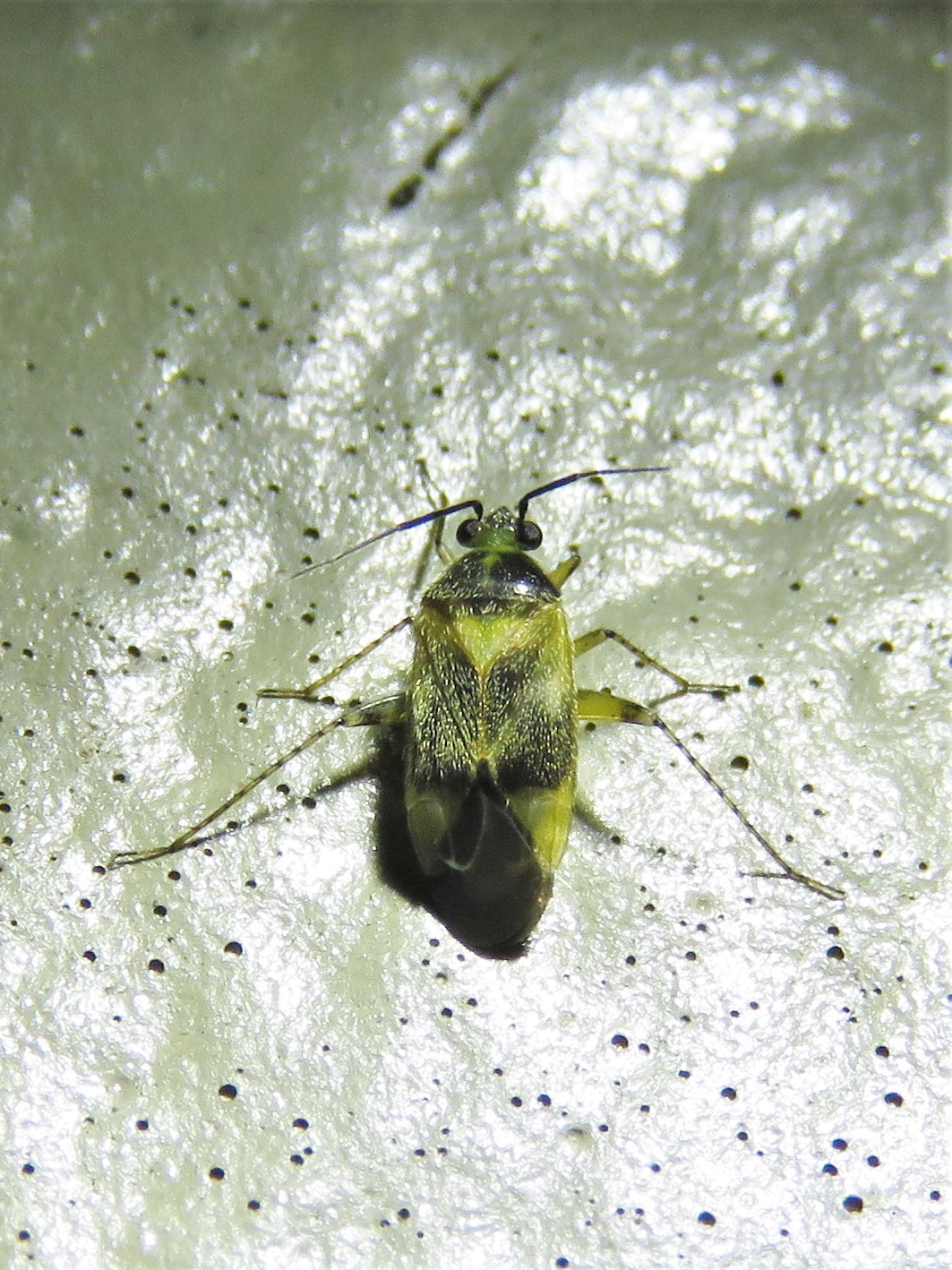
Plagiognathus blatchleyi, Texas

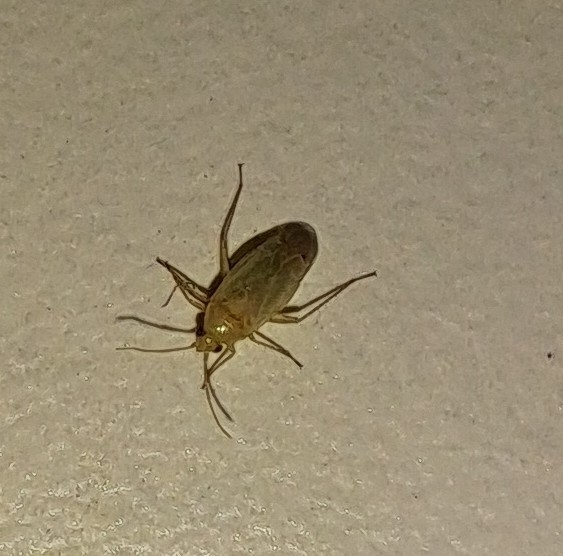
Plagiognathus bipunctatus albicans, Turkey

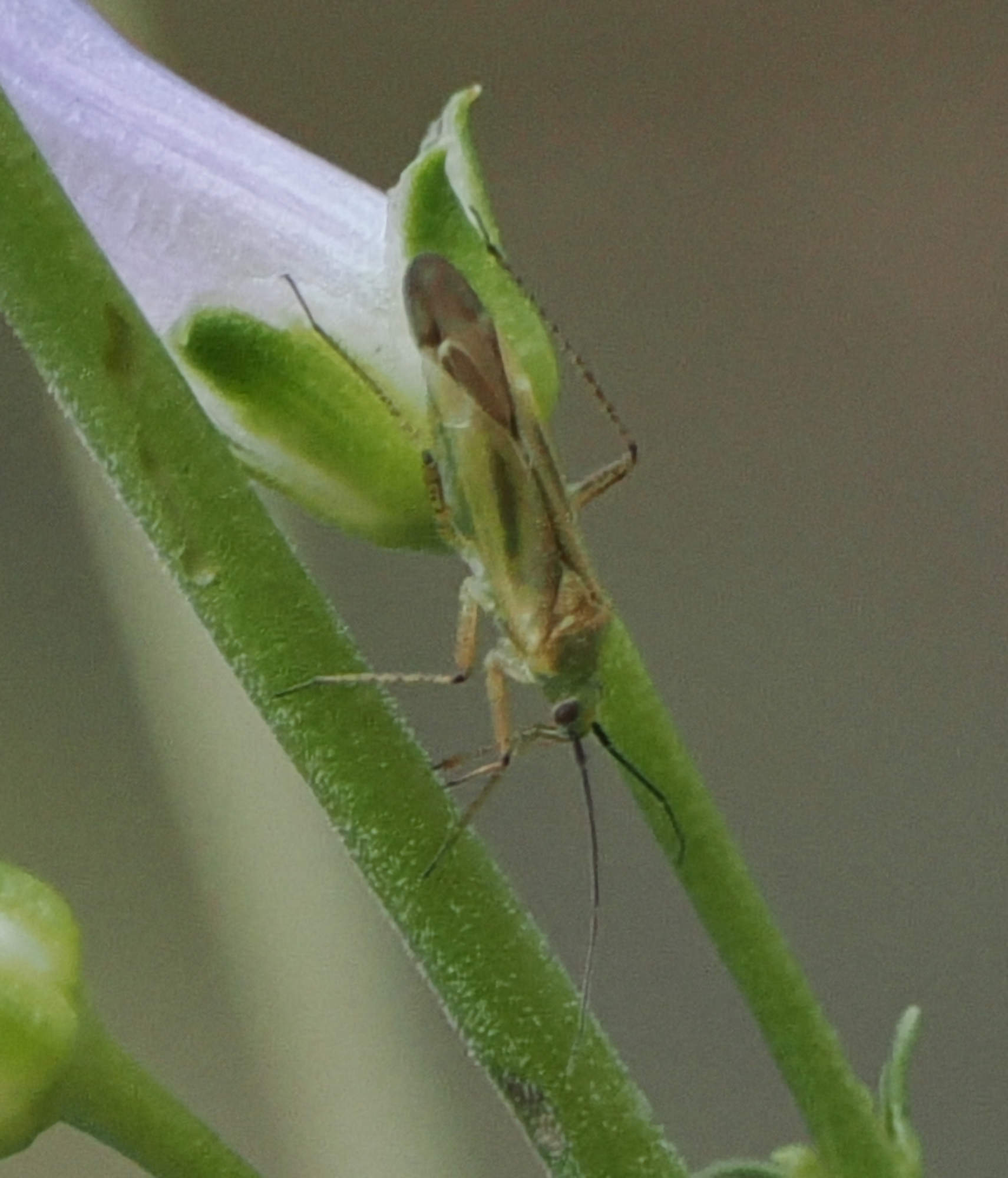
Plagiognathus longipennis, Arizona
