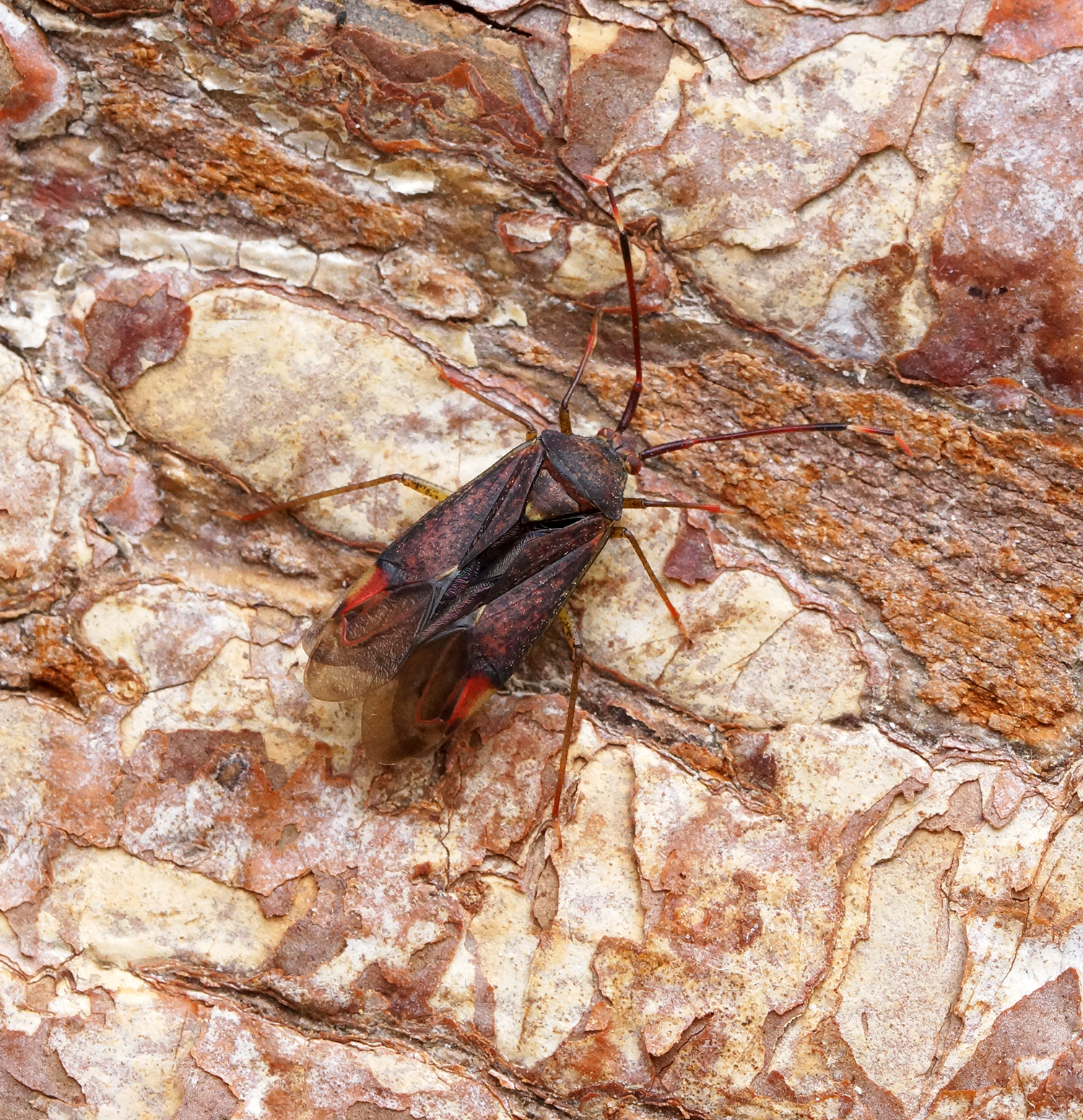
- Phylus coryli

Scientific classification
- Domain: Eukaryota
- Kingdom: Animalia
- Phylum: Arthropoda
- Class: Insecta
- Order: Hemiptera
- Suborder: Heteroptera
- Family: Miridae
- Subfamily: Phylinae
- Tribe: Phylini; Douglas & Scott, 1865

= Phylini =

Tribe of true bugs

Phylini is a tribe of plant bugs in the family Miridae, based on the type genus Phylus. There are at least 440 described species in Phylini.

== Subtribes and selected genera ==
- Full list of Phylini genera here

=== Keltoniina ===
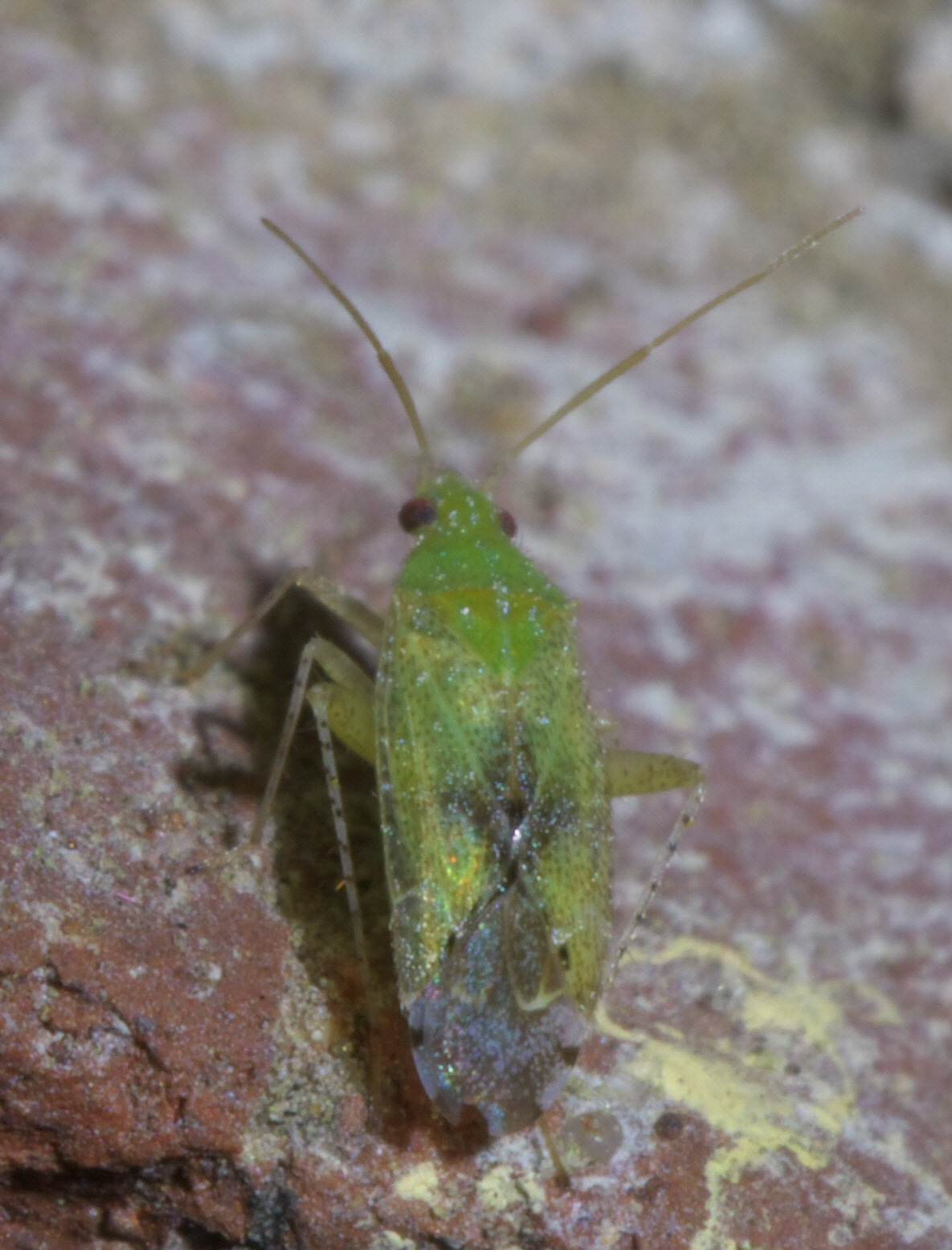
Keltonia tuckeri

Auth. Schuh & Menard, 2013

- Keltonia Knight, 1966 - Nearctic
- Pseudatomoscelis Poppius, 1911 - Caribbean, Mexico
- Reuteroscopus Kirkaldy, 1905 - New World

=== Oncotylina ===
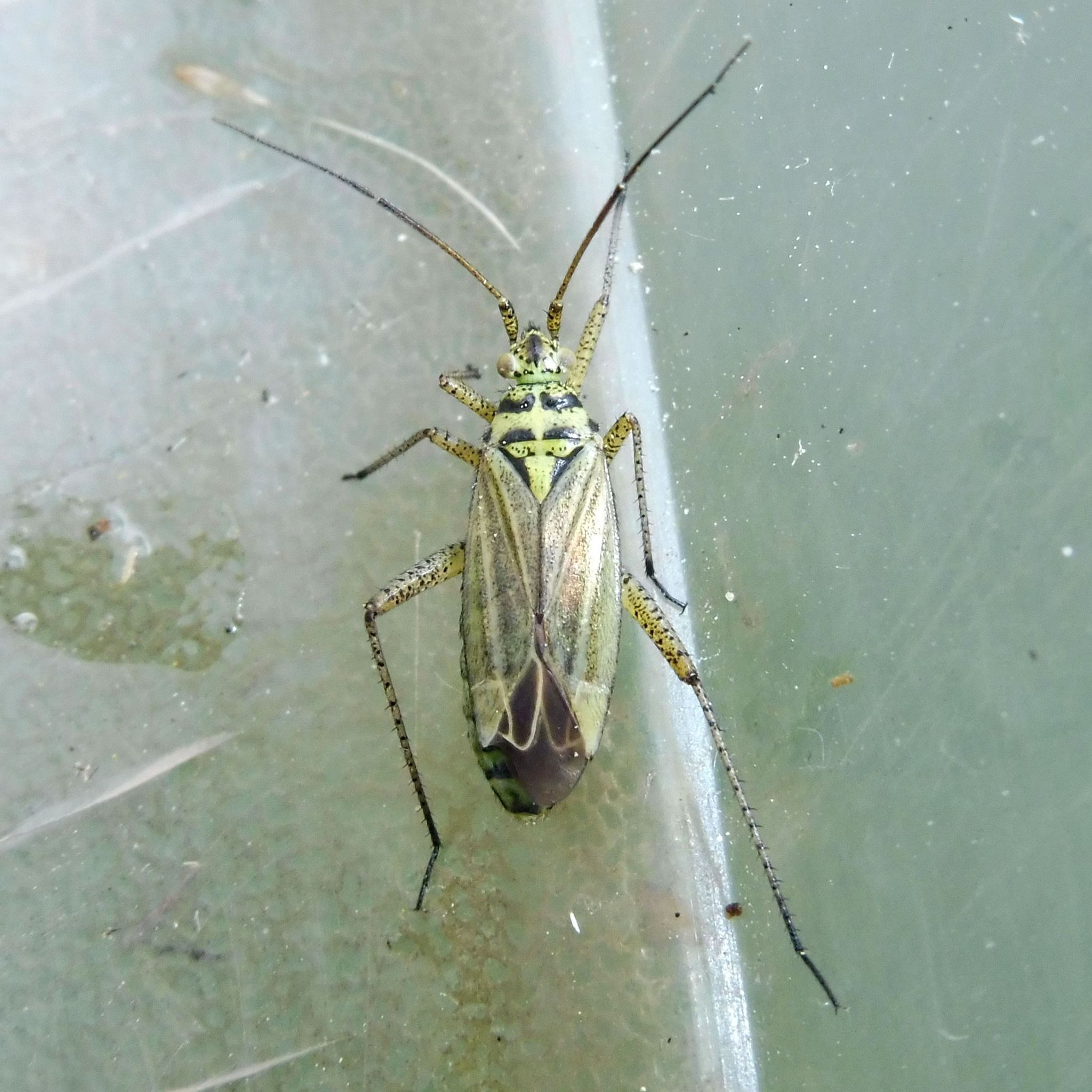
Oncotylus viridiflavus

Auth. Douglas & Scott, 1865

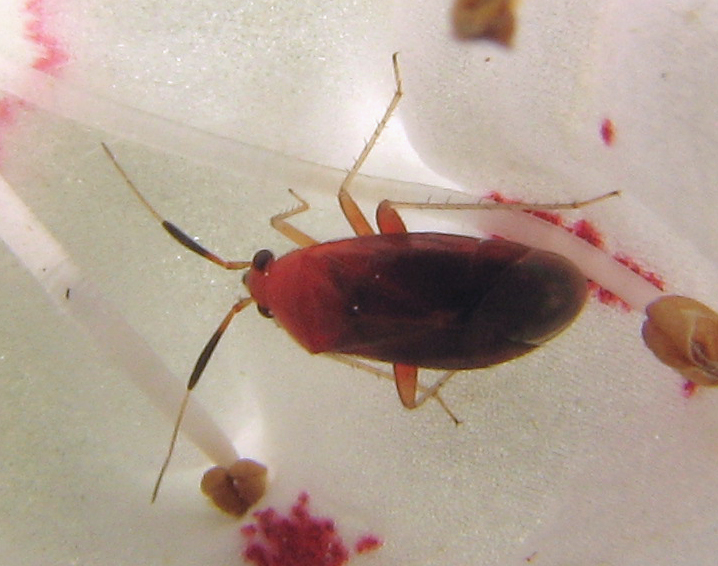
Rhinocapsus vanduzeei

- Americodema T. Henry, 1999 - Nearctic
- Asciodema Reuter, 1878 - Palearctic, Nearctic
- Brachyarthrum Fieber, 1858 - Palearctic
- Europiella Reuter, 1909 - Holarctic
- Europiellomorpha Duwal, 2014
- Oncotylus Fieber, 1858 - Holarctic
- Parapsallus Wagner, 1952 - Palearctic
- Phyllopidea Knight, 1919 - Western Nearctic
- Placochilus Fieber, 1858 - Palearctic
- Plagiognathus Fieber, 1858 - Holarctic
- Plesiodema Reuter, 1875 - Holarctic
- Psallodema V. Putshkov, 1970 - Palearctic
- Ranzovius Distant, 1893 - Americas
- Rhinocapsus Uhler, 1890 - Eastern Nearctic
- Sthenaropsidea Henry & Schuh, 2002 - Eastern Nearctic
- Tinicephalus Fieber, 1858 - Palearctic

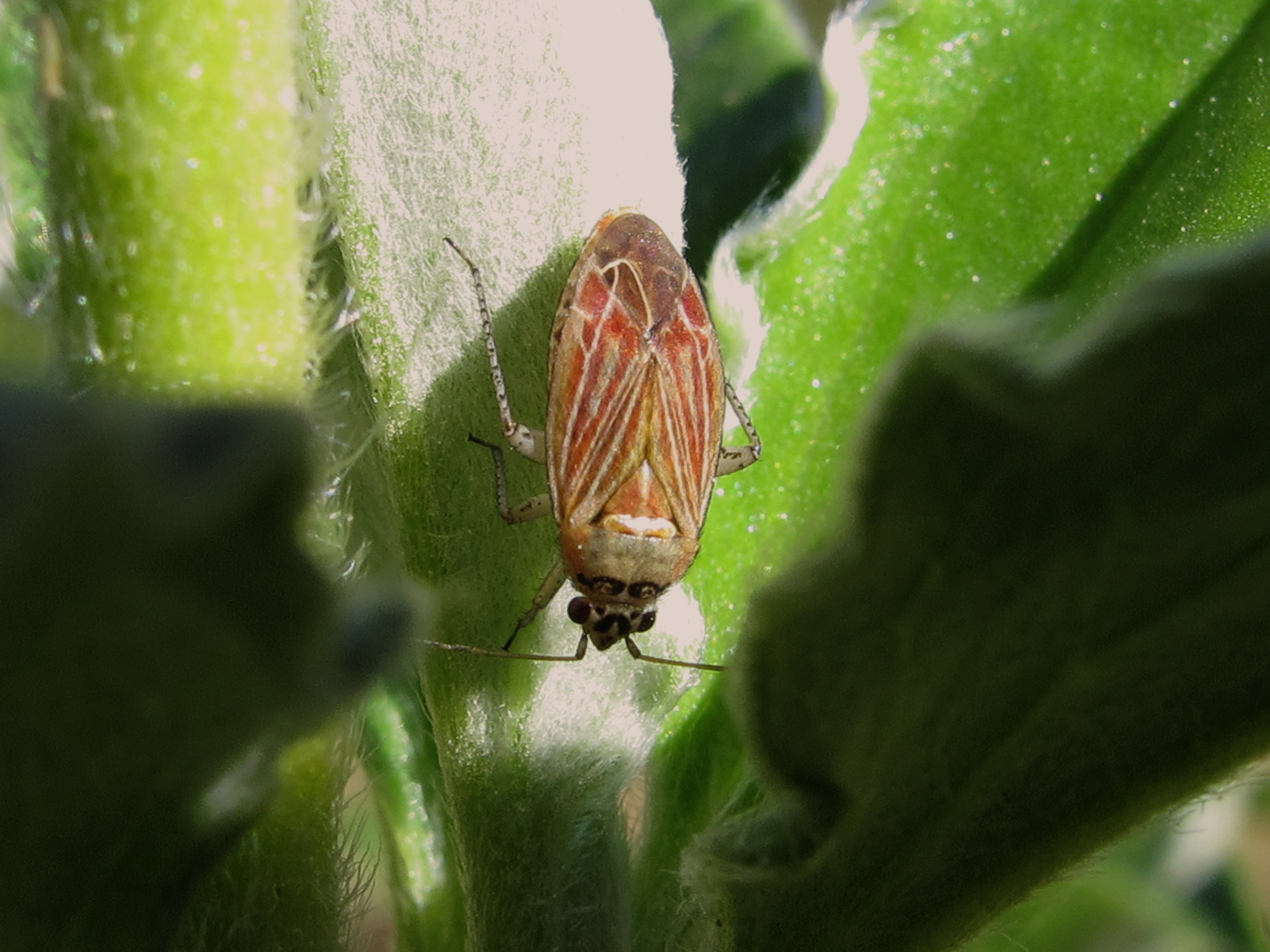
Pachyxyphus lineellus

=== Phylina ===
Auth. Douglas & Scott, 1865

- Conostethus Fieber, 1858 - Holarctic
- Lepidargyrus Muminov, 1962 - Palearctic
- Orthonotus Stephens, 1829 - Palearctic
- Orthophylus Duwal & Lee, 2011
- Phylus Hahn, 1831 - Palearctic
- Psallus Fieber, 1858 - Holarctic
- Sthenarus Fieber, 1858 - Palearctic
