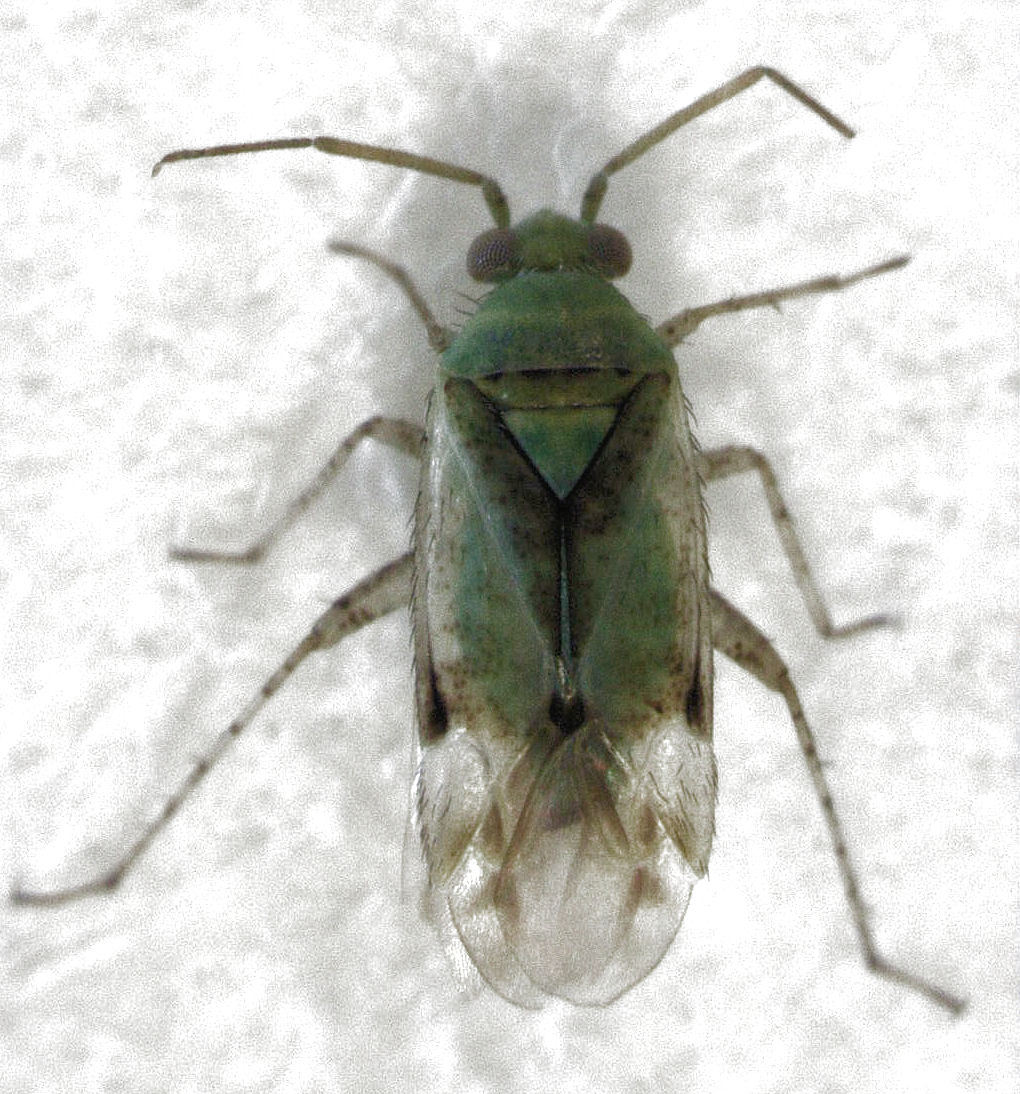
- Leptidolon galbanus, New Zealand

Scientific classification
- Kingdom: Animalia
- Phylum: Arthropoda
- Class: Insecta
- Order: Hemiptera
- Suborder: Heteroptera
- Family: Miridae
- Subfamily: Phylinae
- Tribe: Semiini; Knight, 1923

Subtribes
- Exocarpocorina Schuh & Menard, 2013; Semiina Knight, 1923

= Semiini =

Tribe of insects

Semiini is a tribe of plant bugs in the family Miridae. There are more than 30 genera in Semiini.

== Genera ==
These 33 genera belong to the tribe Semiini:

Subtribe Exocarpocorina Schuh & Menard, 2013
Ampimpacoris Weirauch & Schuh, 2011 - Neotropics
Ancoraphylus Weirauch, 2007 - Australia
Araucanophylus Carvalho, 1984 - Neotropics
Basileobius Eyles & Schuh, 2003 - Australia
Chiloephylus Carvalho, 1984 - Neotropics
Cyrtodiridius Eyles & Schuh, 2003 - Australia
Exocarpocoris Weirauch, 2007 - Australia
Gonzalezinus Carvalho, 1981 - Neotropics
Halormus Eyles & Schuh, 2003 - Australia
Harpagophylus Schuh & Weirauch, 2010 - Australia
Jiwarli Soto & Weirauch, 2007 - Australia
Leptidolon Reuter, 1904 - Australia, New Zealand
Mecenopa Eyles & Schuh, 2003 - Australia
Melaleucoides Schuh & Weirauch, 2010 - Australia
Pimeleocoris Eyles & Schuh, 2003 - Australia
Polyozus Eyles & Schuh, 2003 - Australia
Thryptomenomiris Schuh & Weirauch, 2010 - Australia
Wallabicoris Schuh & Pedraza, 2010 - Australia
Xiphoidellus Weirauch & Schuh, 2011 - Australia
Xiphoides Eyles & Schuh, 2003 - Australia
Subtribe Semiina Knight, 1923
Criocoris Fieber, 1858 - Holarctic
Hoplomachidea Reuter, 1909 - Western Nearctic
Karoocapsus Schuh, 1974 - Africa
Monocris V. Putshkov, 1974 - Palearctic
Monospatha Eyles & Schuh 2003
Myrmicopsella Poppius, 1914 - Africa
Nicholia Knight, 1929 - Nearctic
Parapseudosthenarus Schuh, 1974 - Africa
Pseudosthenarus Poppius, 1914 - Africa
Rakula Odhiambo, 1967 - Africa
Semium Reuter, 1876 - Nearctic
Thoth Linnavuori, 1993 - Africa
Tytthus Fieber, 1864 - Cosmopolitan
