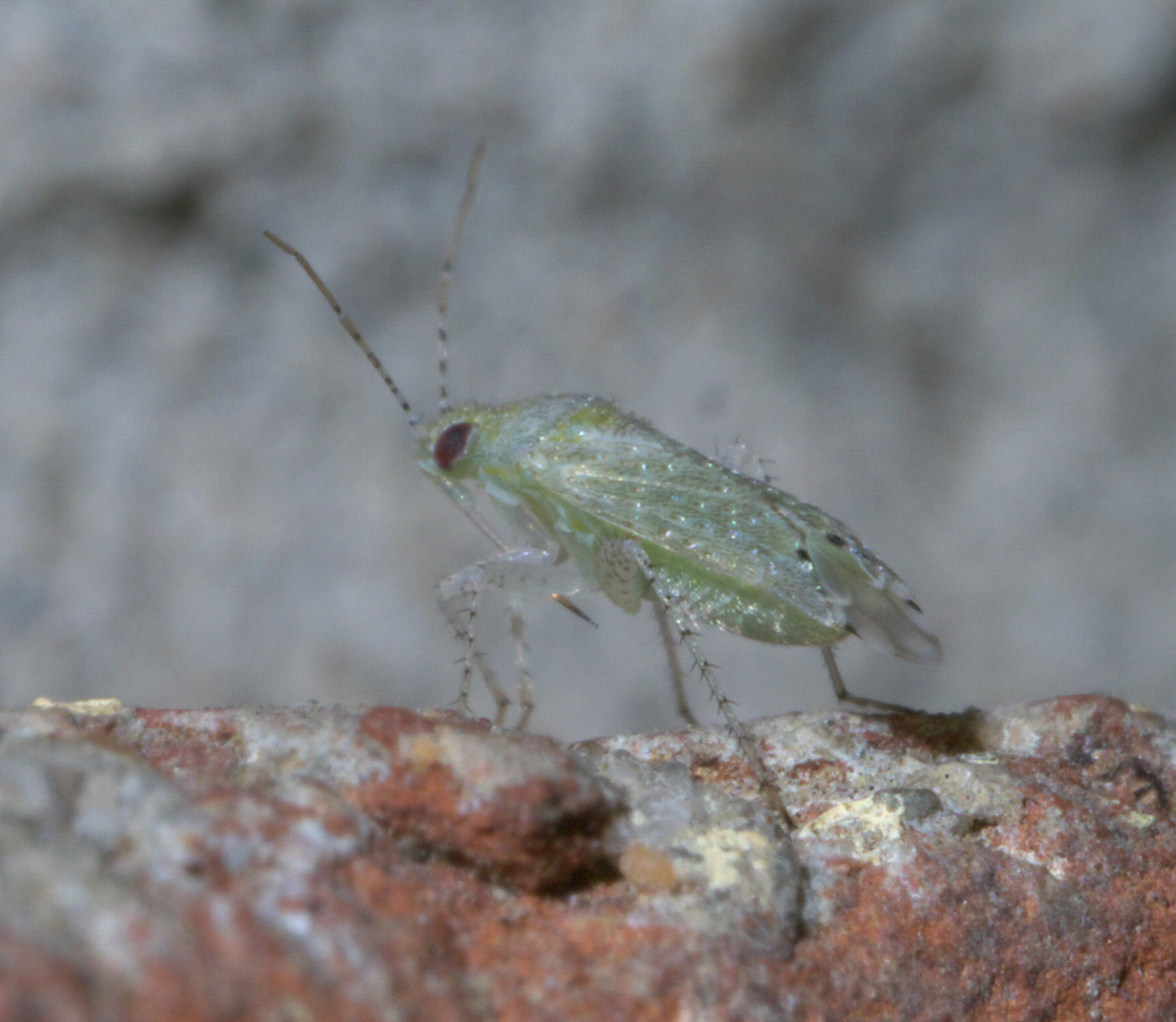

Scientific classification
- Kingdom: Animalia
- Phylum: Arthropoda
- Class: Insecta
- Order: Hemiptera
- Suborder: Heteroptera
- Family: Miridae
- Subfamily: Phylinae
- Tribe: Phylini
- Genus: Pseudatomoscelis
- Species: P. seriatus

Binomial name
- Pseudatomoscelis seriatus (Reuter, 1876)

= Pseudatomoscelis seriatus =

Species of true bug

Pseudatomoscelis seriatus, the cotton fleahopper, is a species of plant bug in the family Miridae. It is found in the Caribbean Sea, Central America, North America, and South America.
