= Criocoris saliens =

Scientific classification
- Kingdom: Animalia
- Phylum: Arthropoda
- Class: Insecta
- Order: Hemiptera
- Suborder: Heteroptera
- Family: Miridae
- Subfamily: Phylinae
- Genus: Criocoris
- Species: C. saliens

Binomial name
- Criocoris saliens (Reuter, 1876)

Species of true bug

Criocoris saliens, the salien plant bug, is a species of plant bug in the family Miridae. It is found in North America.
