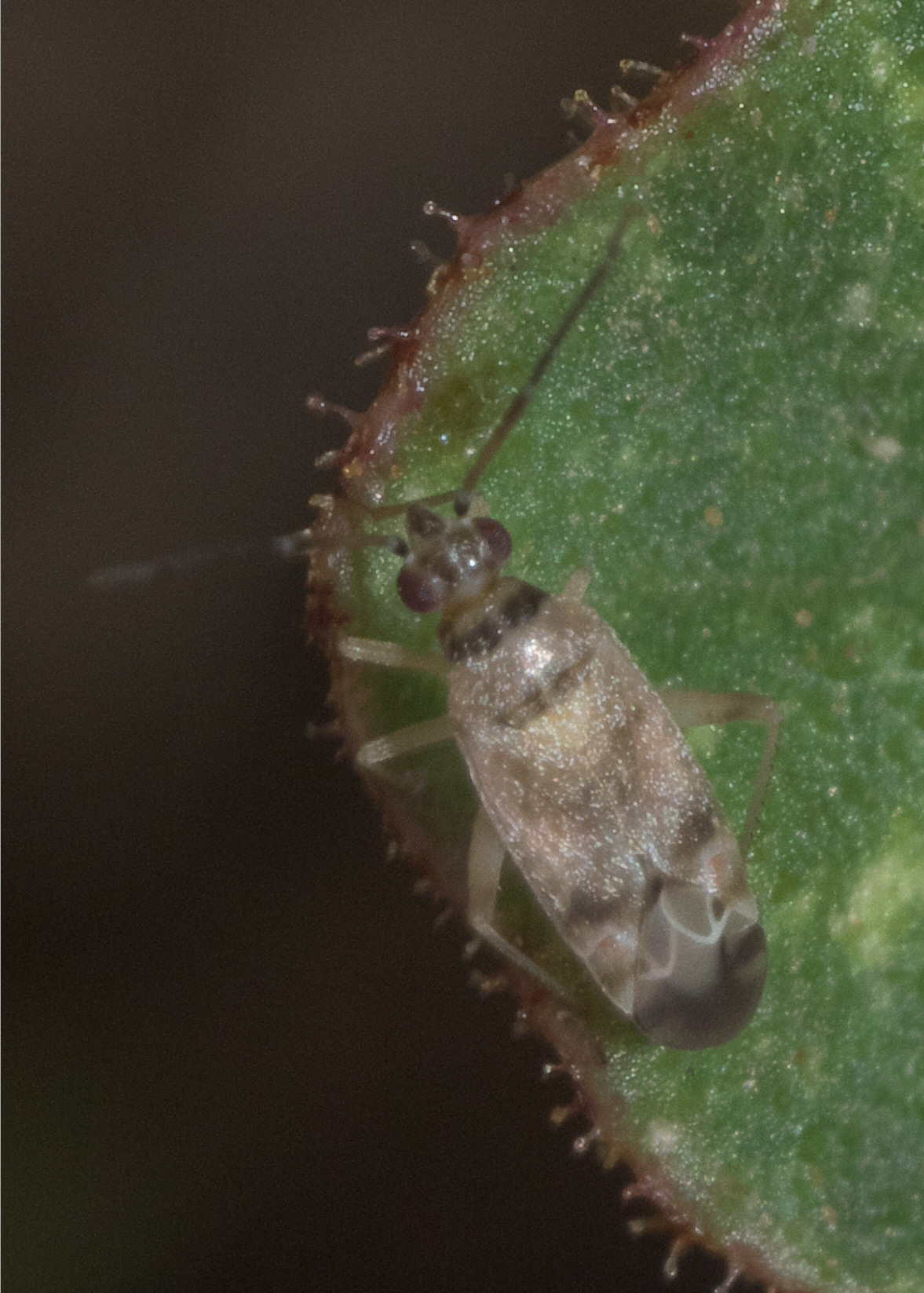
- Reuteroscopus tinctipennis, Arizona

Scientific classification
- Kingdom: Animalia
- Phylum: Arthropoda
- Class: Insecta
- Order: Hemiptera
- Suborder: Heteroptera
- Family: Miridae
- Subfamily: Phylinae
- Tribe: Phylini
- Genus: Reuteroscopus
- Species: R. tinctipennis

Binomial name
- Reuteroscopus tinctipennis (Knight, 1925)

= Reuteroscopus tinctipennis =

Species of true bugs

Reuteroscopus tinctipennis is a species of plant bug in the family Miridae. It is found in the southwestern United States and northwestern Mexico.
