= Ranzovius clavicornis =

Scientific classification
- Kingdom: Animalia
- Phylum: Arthropoda
- Class: Insecta
- Order: Hemiptera
- Suborder: Heteroptera
- Family: Miridae
- Subfamily: Phylinae
- Tribe: Phylini
- Genus: Ranzovius
- Species: R. clavicornis

Binomial name
- Ranzovius clavicornis (Knight, 1927)

Species of true bug

Ranzovius clavicornis is a species of plant bug in the family Miridae. It is found in North America. It scavenges dead insects for food, and can be found inhabiting the webs of Anelosimus studiosus, stealing the spider's prey.
