= Megalopsallus marmoratus =

Scientific classification
- Kingdom: Animalia
- Phylum: Arthropoda
- Class: Insecta
- Order: Hemiptera
- Suborder: Heteroptera
- Family: Miridae
- Subfamily: Phylinae
- Genus: Megalopsallus
- Species: M. marmoratus

Binomial name
- Megalopsallus marmoratus Knight, 1968

Species of true bug

Megalopsallus marmoratus is a species of plant bug in the family Miridae. It is found in Central America and North America.
