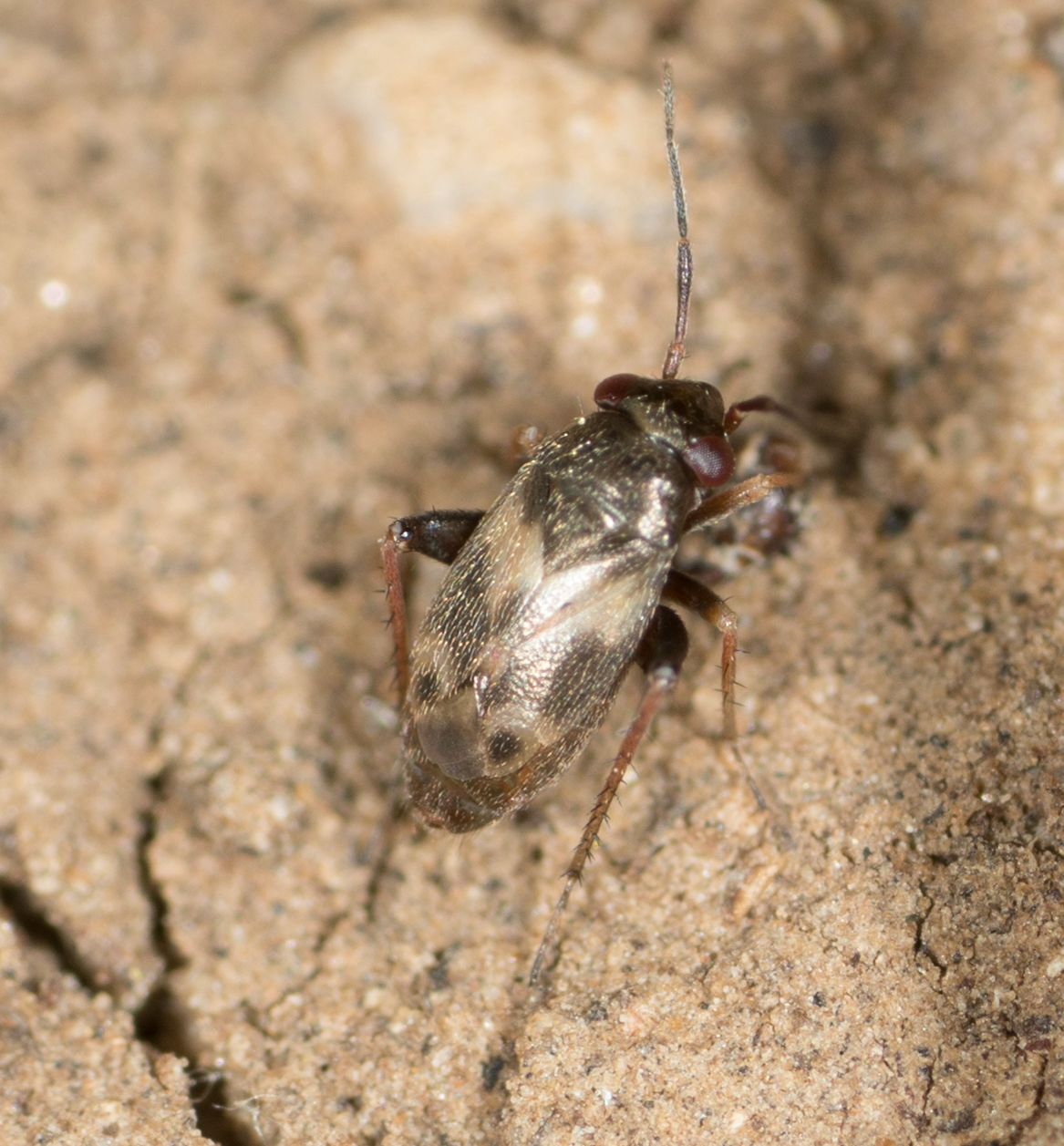

Scientific classification
- Kingdom: Animalia
- Phylum: Arthropoda
- Class: Insecta
- Order: Hemiptera
- Suborder: Heteroptera
- Family: Miridae
- Subfamily: Phylinae
- Genus: Spanagonicus
- Species: S. albofasciatus

Binomial name
- Spanagonicus albofasciatus (Reuter, 1907)

= Spanagonicus albofasciatus =

Species of true bug

Spanagonicus albofasciatus, the whitemarked fleahopper, is a species of plant bug in the family Miridae. It is found in the Caribbean Sea, Central America, North America, and Oceania.
