= Americodema knighti =

Scientific classification
- Kingdom: Animalia
- Phylum: Arthropoda
- Class: Insecta
- Order: Hemiptera
- Suborder: Heteroptera
- Family: Miridae
- Subfamily: Phylinae
- Tribe: Phylini
- Genus: Americodema
- Species: A. knighti

Binomial name
- Americodema knighti (Kerzhner & Schuh, 1998)

Synonyms
- Plagiognathus knighti Kerzhner and Schuh, 1998

Species of true bug

Americodema knighti is a species of plant bug in the family Miridae.
