= Ranzovius californicus =

Scientific classification
- Kingdom: Animalia
- Phylum: Arthropoda
- Class: Insecta
- Order: Hemiptera
- Suborder: Heteroptera
- Family: Miridae
- Subfamily: Phylinae
- Tribe: Phylini
- Genus: Ranzovius
- Species: R. californicus

Binomial name
- Ranzovius californicus (Van Duzee, 1917)

Species of true bug

Ranzovius californicus is a species of plant bug in the family Miridae. It is found in North America., specifically in the sheet webs of Hololena curta, where it feeds on prey caught in the web.
