= Polyozus =

Polyozus is a synonym for two genera:

- Leptidolon, a genus of plant bug
- Psychotria, a genus of flowering plant
