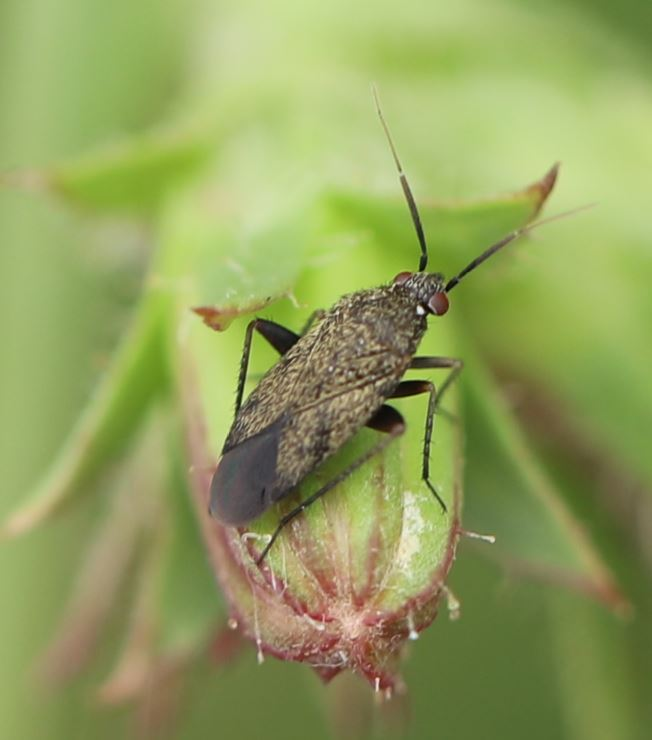

Scientific classification
- Kingdom: Animalia
- Phylum: Arthropoda
- Class: Insecta
- Order: Hemiptera
- Suborder: Heteroptera
- Family: Miridae
- Subfamily: Phylinae
- Tribe: Phylini
- Genus: Lepidargyrus
- Species: L. ancorifer

Binomial name
- Lepidargyrus ancorifer (Fieber, 1858)

Synonyms
- Apocremnus ancorifer Fieber, 1858

= Lepidargyrus ancorifer =

Species of true bug

Lepidargyrus ancorifer is a species of plant bug in the family Miridae. It is found in Africa, Europe and Northern Asia (excluding China), and North America.
