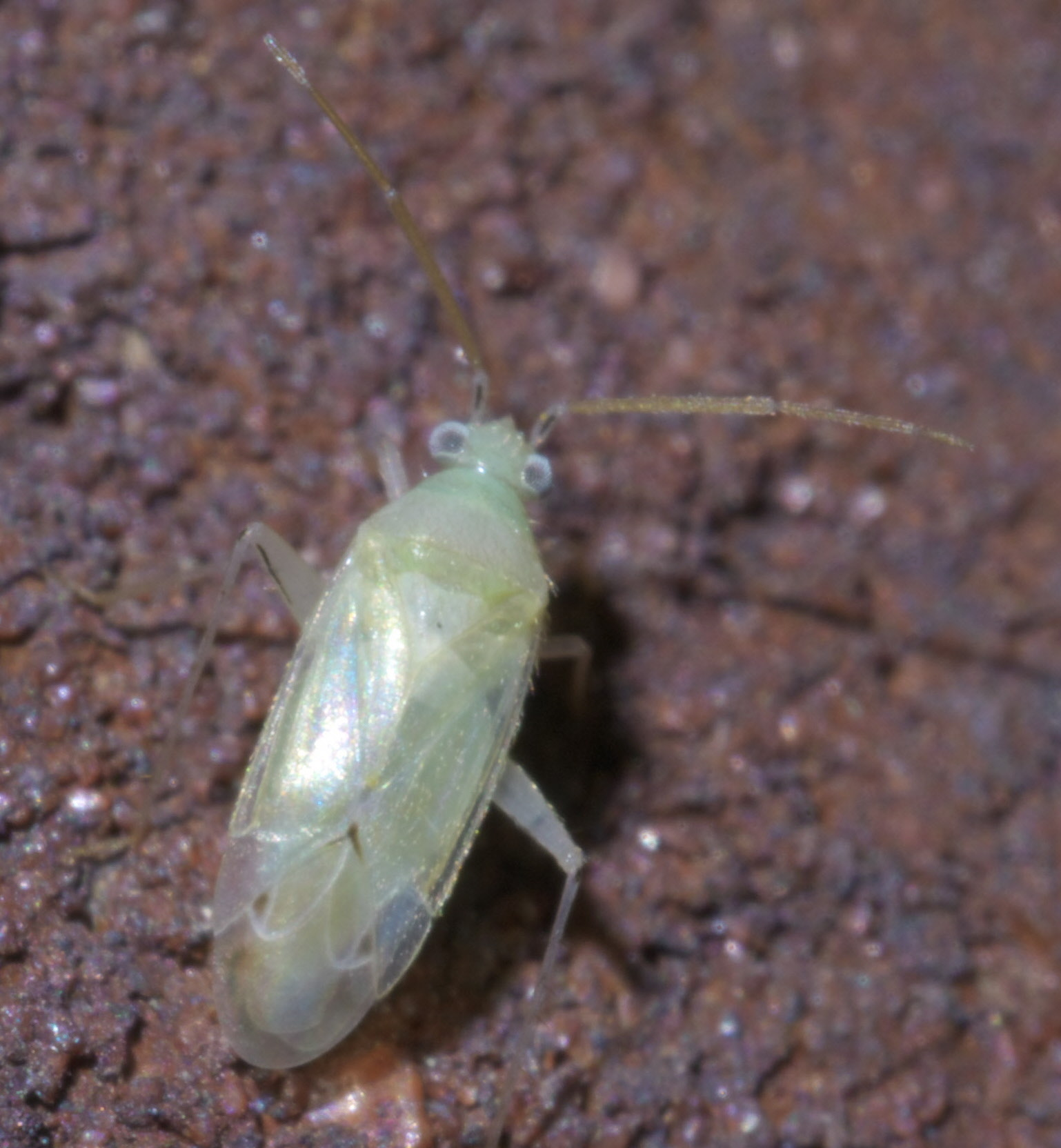

Scientific classification
- Kingdom: Animalia
- Phylum: Arthropoda
- Class: Insecta
- Order: Hemiptera
- Suborder: Heteroptera
- Family: Miridae
- Subfamily: Phylinae
- Tribe: Phylini
- Genus: Americodema
- Species: A. nigrolineatum

Binomial name
- Americodema nigrolineatum (Knight, 1923)

Synonyms
- Plagiognathus nigrolineatus Knight, 1923

= Americodema nigrolineatum =

Species of true bug

Americodema nigrolineatum is a species of plant bug in the family Miridae. It is found in Central America and North America.
