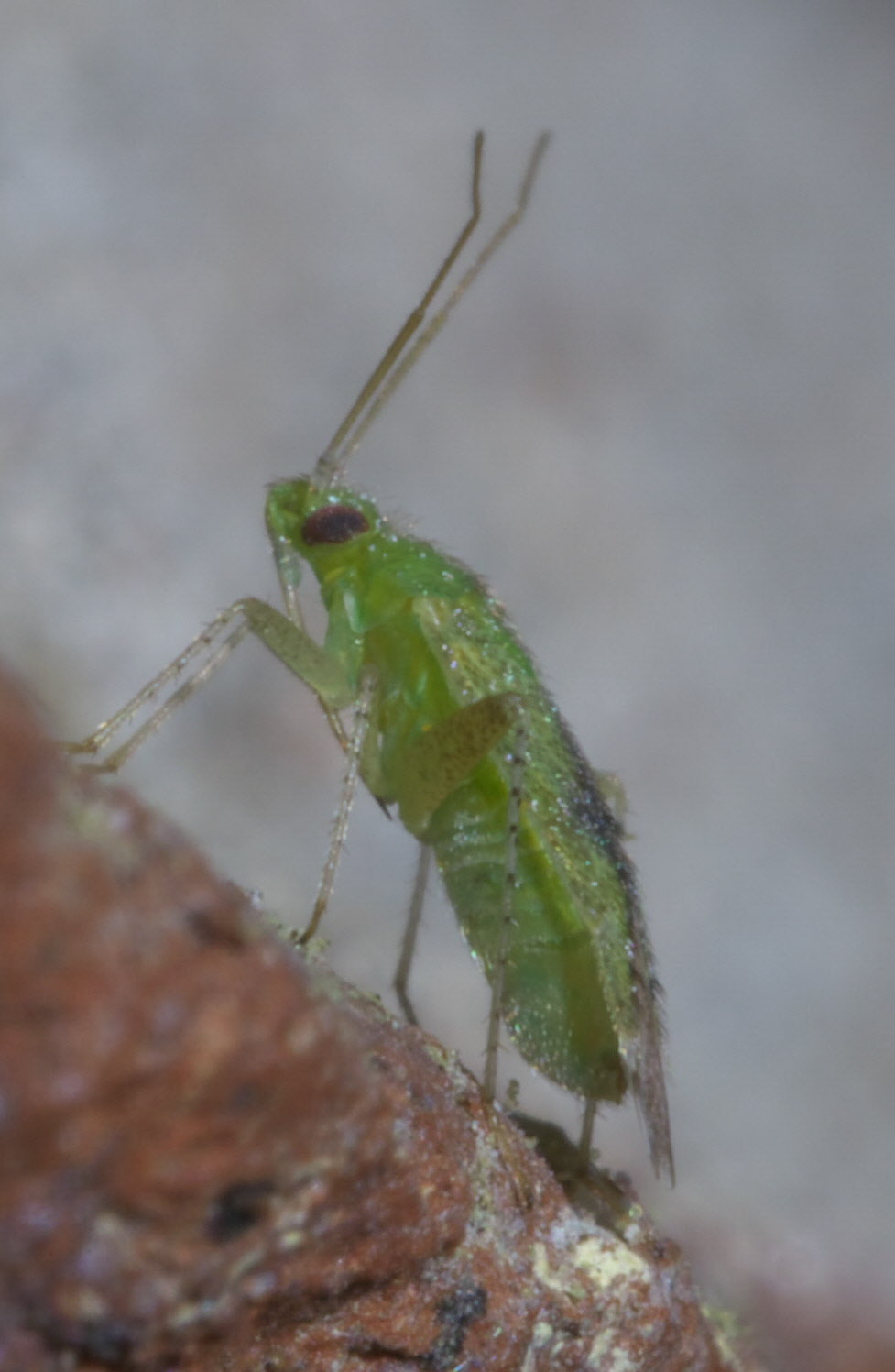

Scientific classification
- Kingdom: Animalia
- Phylum: Arthropoda
- Class: Insecta
- Order: Hemiptera
- Suborder: Heteroptera
- Family: Miridae
- Subfamily: Phylinae
- Tribe: Phylini
- Genus: Keltonia
- Species: K. tuckeri

Binomial name
- Keltonia tuckeri (Poppius, 1911)

Synonyms
- Pseudatomoscelis tuckeri Poppius, 1911

= Keltonia tuckeri =

Species of true bug

Keltonia tuckeri is a species of plant bug in the family Miridae. It is found in Central America, North America, and South America.

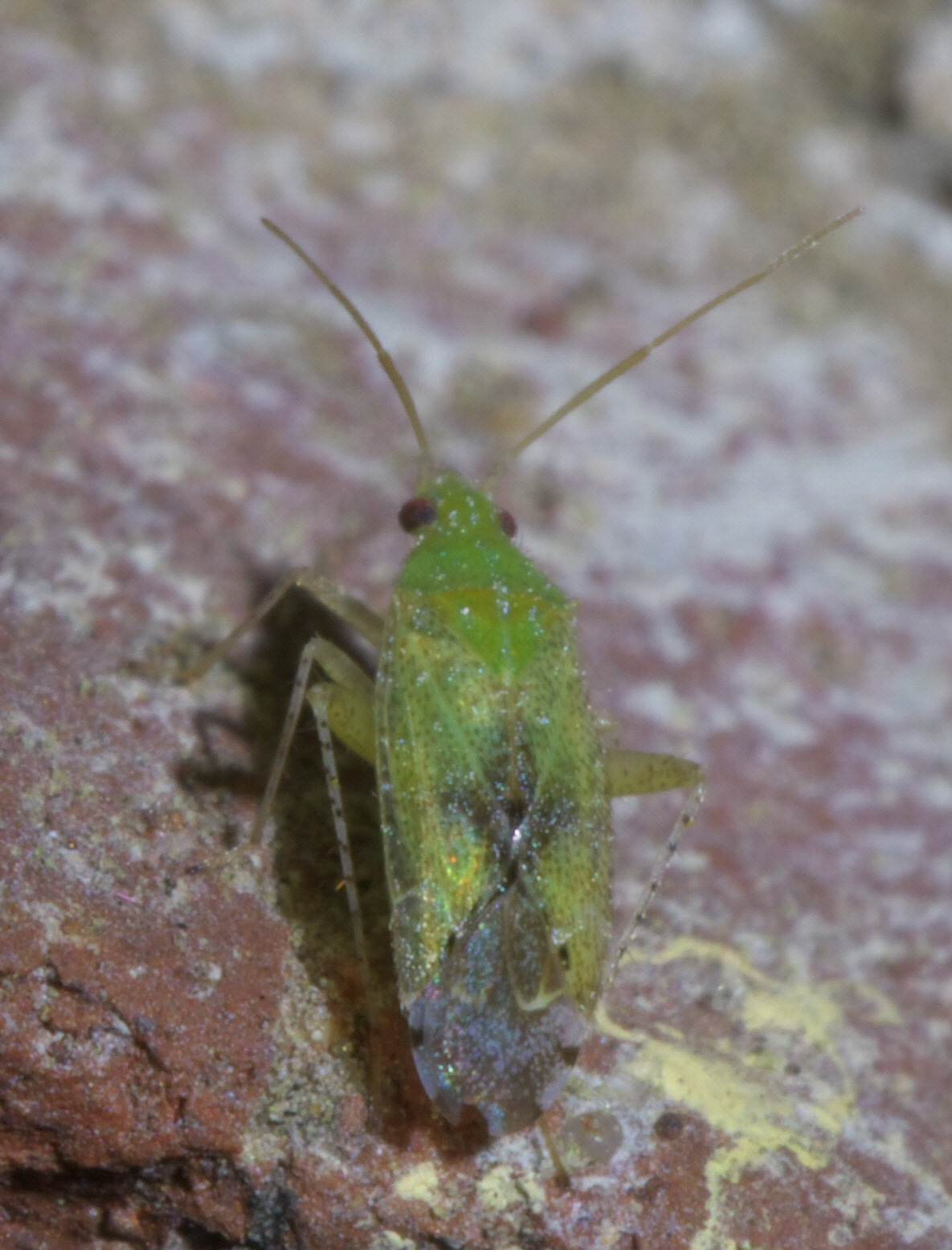
