= Phyllopidea picta =

Scientific classification
- Kingdom: Animalia
- Phylum: Arthropoda
- Class: Insecta
- Order: Hemiptera
- Suborder: Heteroptera
- Family: Miridae
- Subfamily: Phylinae
- Tribe: Phylini
- Genus: Phyllopidea
- Species: P. picta

Binomial name
- Phyllopidea picta (Uhler, 1893)

Synonyms
- Bolteria picta Uhler, 1893

Species of true bug

Phyllopidea picta is a species of plant bug in the family Miridae. It is found in North America.
