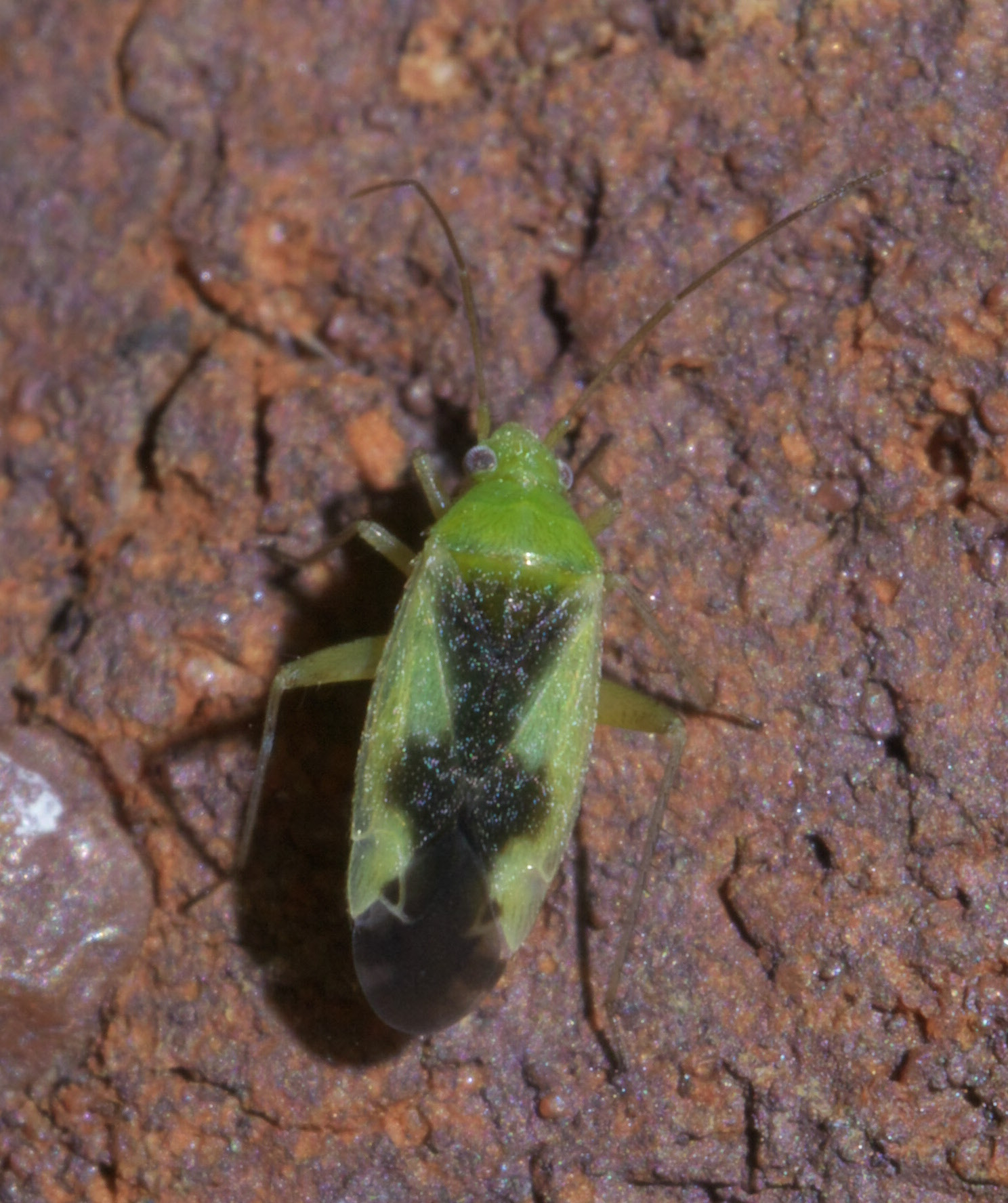

Scientific classification
- Kingdom: Animalia
- Phylum: Arthropoda
- Class: Insecta
- Order: Hemiptera
- Suborder: Heteroptera
- Family: Miridae
- Subfamily: Phylinae
- Tribe: Phylini
- Genus: Reuteroscopus
- Species: R. ornatus

Binomial name
- Reuteroscopus ornatus (Reuter, 1876)

Synonyms
- Episcopus ornatus Reuter, 1876

= Reuteroscopus ornatus =

Species of true bug

Reuteroscopus ornatus, the ornate plant bug, is a species of plant bug in the family Miridae. It is found in the Caribbean Sea, Central America, and North America.

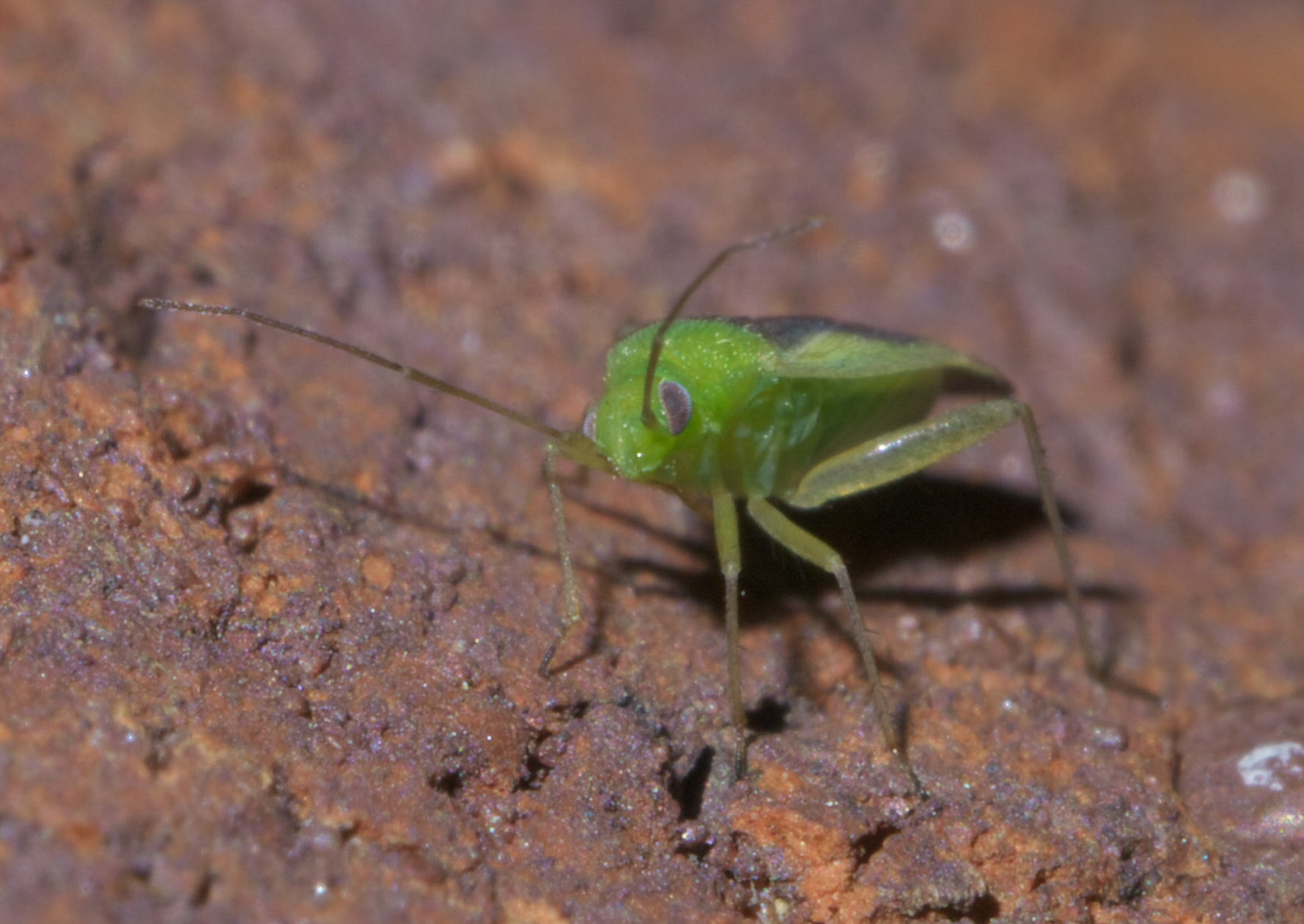
Ornate plant bug, Reuteroscopus ornatus
