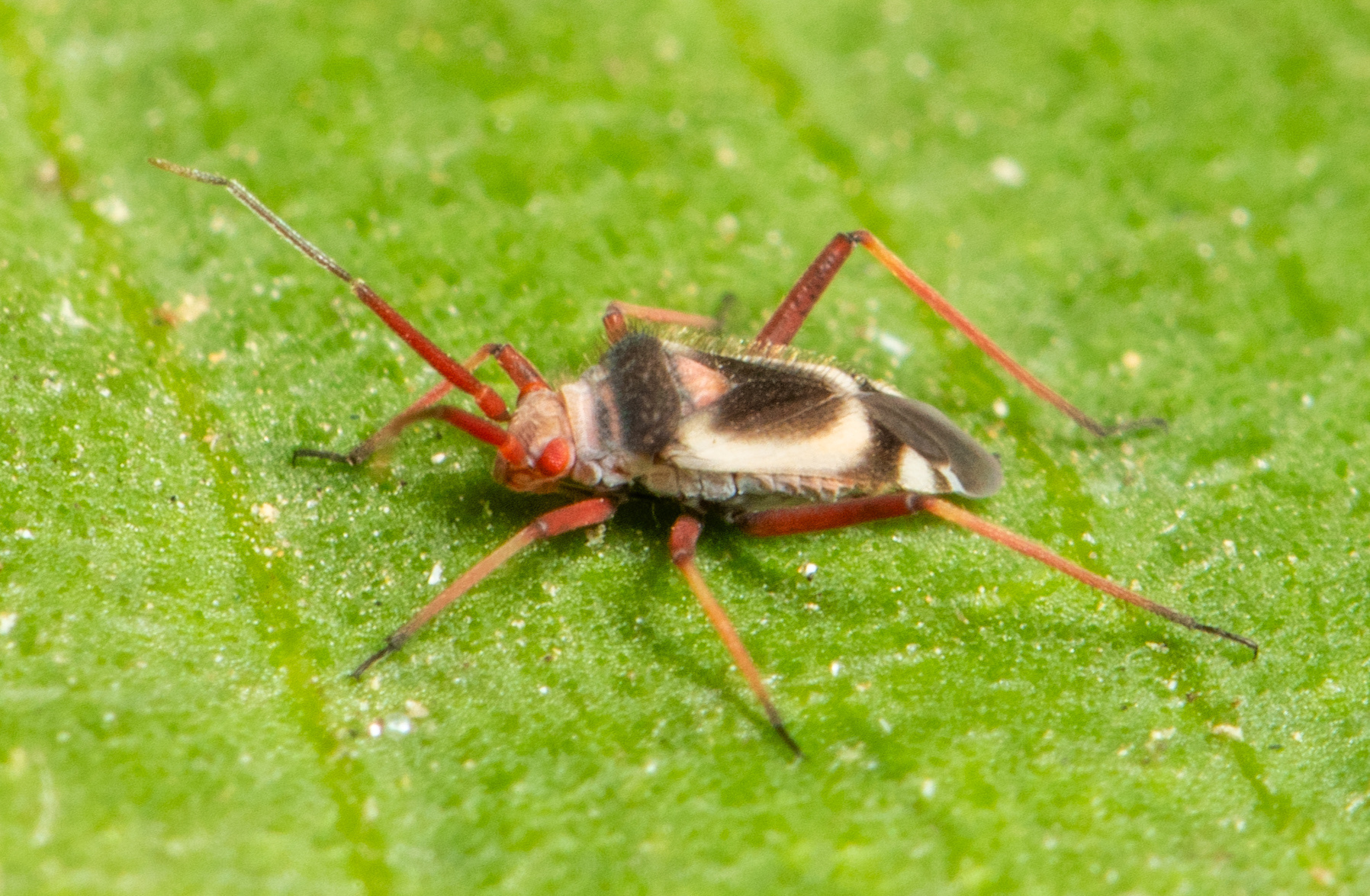

Scientific classification
- Kingdom: Animalia
- Phylum: Arthropoda
- Class: Insecta
- Order: Hemiptera
- Suborder: Heteroptera
- Family: Miridae
- Subfamily: Phylinae
- Genus: Semium
- Species: S. hirtum

Binomial name
- Semium hirtum Reuter, 1876

= Semium hirtum =

Species of true bug

Semium hirtum is a species of plant bug in the family Miridae. It is found in Central America and North America.
