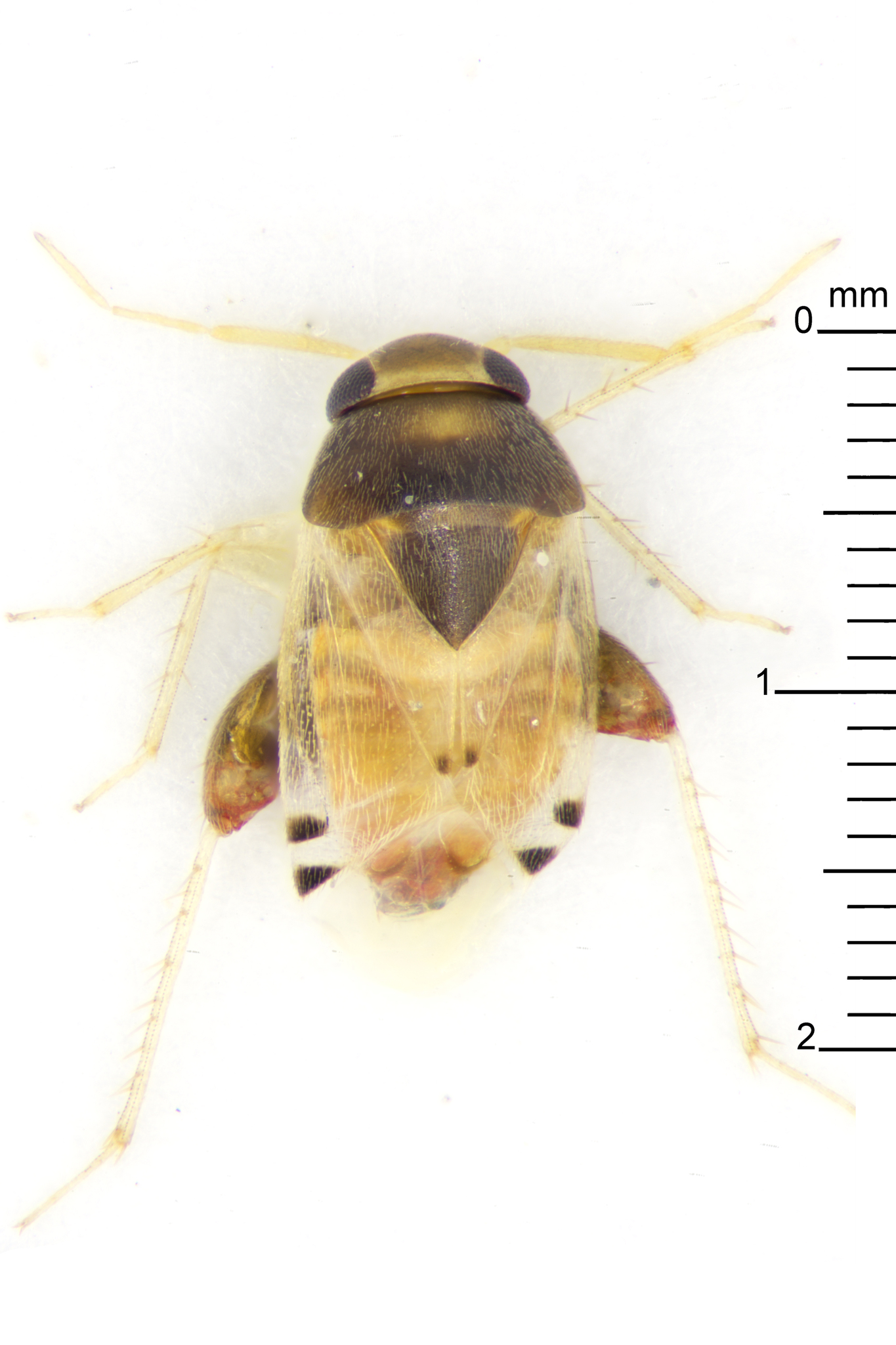
- Decomia, Brunei

Scientific classification
- Kingdom: Animalia
- Phylum: Arthropoda
- Class: Insecta
- Order: Hemiptera
- Suborder: Heteroptera
- Family: Miridae
- Subfamily: Phylinae
- Tribe: Decomiini; Schuh & Menard, 2013

= Decomiini =

Tribe of insects

Decomiini is a tribe of plant bugs in the family Miridae. There are about six genera in Decomiini.

== Genera ==
These six genera belong to the tribe Decomiini:

- Aurantiocoris Schuh & Schwartz, 2004 - Western Nearctic
- Decomia Poppius, 1915 - Paleotropical
- Decomioides Schuh, 1984 - Orient
- Malaysiamiris Schuh, 1984 - Orient
- Malaysiamiroides Schuh, 1984 - Orient
- Rubrocuneocoris Schuh, 1984 - Orient, Pacific Islands
