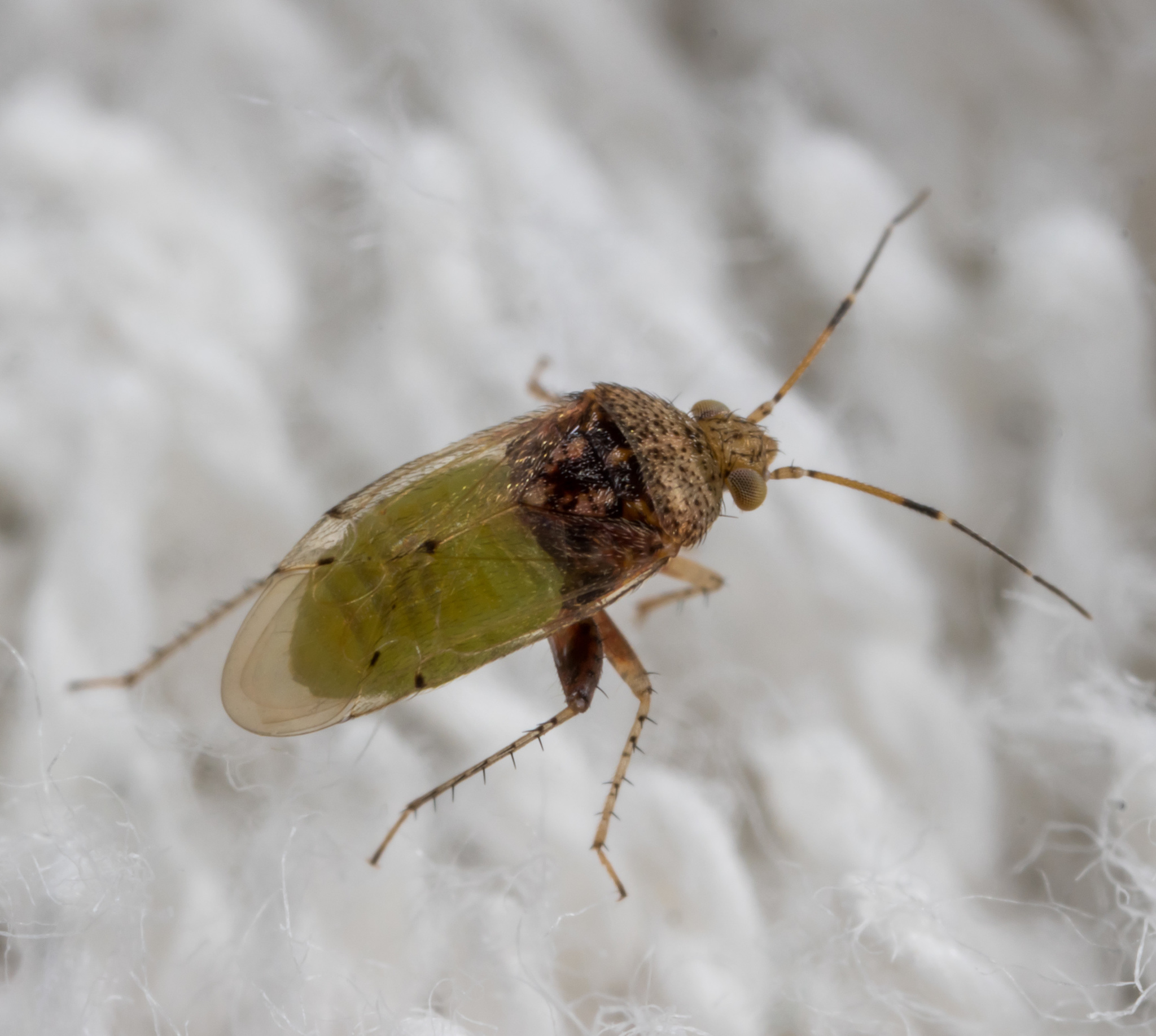
- Moissonia, Hong Kong

Scientific classification
- Kingdom: Animalia
- Phylum: Arthropoda
- Class: Insecta
- Order: Hemiptera
- Suborder: Heteroptera
- Family: Miridae
- Subfamily: Phylinae
- Tribe: Exaeretini; Futon, 1875

= Exaeretini =

Tribe of insects

Exaeretini is a tribe of plant bugs in the family Miridae. There are more than 20 genera in Exaeretini.

== Genera ==
These 24 genera belong to the tribe Exaeretini:

- Anonychiella Reuter, 1912 - Palearctic
- Aphaenophyes Reuter, 1899 - Palearctic
- Atractotomimus Kiritshenko, 1952 - Palearctic
- Auchenocrepis Fieber, 1858 - Palearctic
- Brendaphylus Yasunaga, 2013 - Orient
- Camptotylus Fieber, 1860 - Palearctic
- Camptozorus Kerzhner, 1996 - Palearctic
- Chrysochnoodes Reuter, 1901 - Palearctic
- Compsonannus Reuter, 1902 - Palearctic
- Eumecotarsus Kerzhner, 1962 - Palearctic
- Eurycranella Reuter, 1904 - Palearctic
- Frotaphylus Carvalho, 1984 - Neotropics
- Gonoporomiris Henry & Schuh, 2002 - Neotropics
- Hadrophyes Puton, 1874 - Palearctic
- Hyalopsallus Carvalho & Schaffner, 1973 - Neotropics
- Megalodactylus Fieber, 1858 - Palearctic
- Moissonia Reuter, 1894 - Circumtropical
- Opuna Kirkaldy, 1902 - Orient, Pacific Islands
- Pastocoris Reuter, 1879 - Palearctic
- Psallopsis Reuter, 1901 - Palearctic
- Randallopsallus Yasunaga, 2013 - Orient
- Tuponia Reuter, 1875 - Palearctic
- Voruchiella Poppius, 1912 - Palearctic
- Yotvata Linnavuori, 1964 - Palearctic
