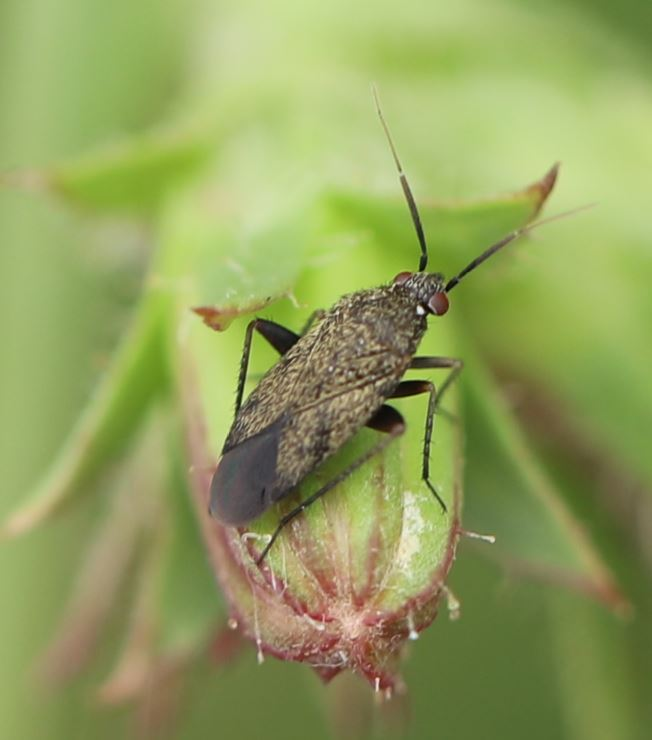
- Lepidargyrus ancorifer

Scientific classification
- Kingdom: Animalia
- Phylum: Arthropoda
- Clade: Pancrustacea
- Class: Insecta
- Order: Hemiptera
- Suborder: Heteroptera
- Family: Miridae
- Subfamily: Phylinae
- Tribe: Phylini
- Genus: Lepidargyrus; Muminov, 1962

= Lepidargyrus =

Genus of true bugs

Lepidargyrus is a genus of plant bugs in the family Miridae. There are about 14 described species in Lepidargyrus.

== Species ==
These 14 species belong to the genus Lepidargyrus:

- Lepidargyrus ancorifer (Fieber, 1858)
- Lepidargyrus fasciatus Konstantinov, 2008
- Lepidargyrus hafezi Linnavuori & Hosseini, 1998
- Lepidargyrus ibericus (Wagner, 1957)
- Lepidargyrus instabilis (Reuter, 1878)
- Lepidargyrus iranicus Muminov, 1962
- Lepidargyrus lividus (Reuter, 1894)
- Lepidargyrus muminovi (Josifov, 1973)
- Lepidargyrus nigerrimus Linnavuori, 1998
- Lepidargyrus pollinosus (Horvath, 1906)
- Lepidargyrus putshkovi Drapolyuk, 1993
- Lepidargyrus seidenstueckeri (Wagner, 1956)
- Lepidargyrus senguni (Wagner, 1956)
- Lepidargyrus syriacus (Wagner, 1956)
