= Megalopsallus =

Scientific classification
- Kingdom: Animalia
- Phylum: Arthropoda
- Clade: Pancrustacea
- Class: Insecta
- Order: Hemiptera
- Suborder: Heteroptera
- Family: Miridae
- Subfamily: Phylinae
- Genus: Megalopsallus; Knight, 1927

Synonyms
- Merinocapsus Knight, 1968

Genus of true bugs

Megalopsallus is a genus of plant bugs in the family Miridae. There are at least 30 described species in Megalopsallus.

== Species ==
These 30 species belong to the genus Megalopsallus:

- Megalopsallus atriplicis Knight, 1927
- Megalopsallus brendae Schuh, 2000
- Megalopsallus brittoni Knight, 1927
- Megalopsallus californicus Schuh, 2000
- Megalopsallus ellae Schuh & Schwartz, 2004
- Megalopsallus ephedrae (Knight, 1968)
- Megalopsallus ephedrellus Schuh, 2000
- Megalopsallus femoralis Kelton, 1980
- Megalopsallus flammeus Schuh, 2000
- Megalopsallus froeschneri (Schuh, 1986)
- Megalopsallus humeralis (Van Duzee, 1923)
- Megalopsallus knowltoni (Knight, 1970)
- Megalopsallus latifrons Knight, 1927
- Megalopsallus marmoratus Knight, 1968
- Megalopsallus nicholi (Knight, 1968)
- Megalopsallus nigricaput Schuh, 2000
- Megalopsallus nigrofemoratus (Knight, 1968)
- Megalopsallus nuperus (Van Duzee, 1923)
- Megalopsallus pallidus (Knight, 1968)
- Megalopsallus pallipes (Knight, 1968)
- Megalopsallus parapunctipes Schuh, 2000
- Megalopsallus pictipes (Van Duzee, 1918)
- Megalopsallus punctatus Schuh, 2000
- Megalopsallus punctipes (Knight, 1968)
- Megalopsallus rubricornis (Knight, 1968)
- Megalopsallus rubropictipes Knight, 1927
- Megalopsallus sarcobati (Knight, 1969)
- Megalopsallus schwartzi Schuh, 2000
- Megalopsallus sparsus (Van Duzee, 1918)
- Megalopsallus teretis Schuh, 2000
