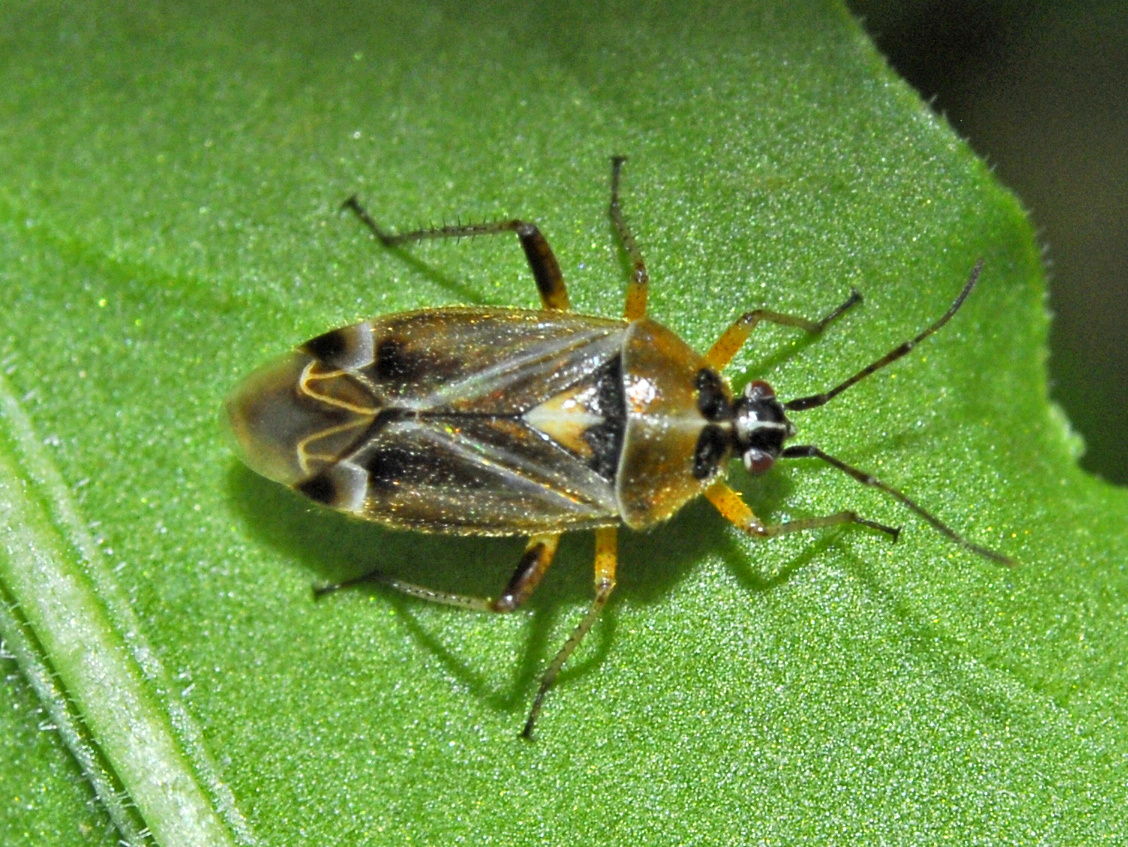
- Harpocera thoracica

Scientific classification
- Kingdom: Animalia
- Phylum: Arthropoda
- Class: Insecta
- Order: Hemiptera
- Suborder: Heteroptera
- Family: Miridae
- Subfamily: Phylinae
- Genus: Harpocera; Curtis, 1838

= Harpocera =

Genus of true bugs

Harpocera is a genus of bugs from Miridae family.

== Species ==
Species within this genus include:

- Harpocera cypria Wagner, 1968
- Harpocera hellenica Reuter, 1876
- Harpocera thoracica (Fallén, 1807)
