= Spanagonicus =

Scientific classification
- Kingdom: Animalia
- Phylum: Arthropoda
- Clade: Pancrustacea
- Class: Insecta
- Order: Hemiptera
- Suborder: Heteroptera
- Family: Miridae
- Subfamily: Phylinae
- Genus: Spanagonicus; Berg, 1883

Synonyms
- Leucopoecila Reuter, 1907

Genus of true bugs

Spanagonicus is a genus of plant bugs in the family Miridae. There are about five described species in Spanagonicus.

== Species ==
These five species belong to the genus Spanagonicus:

- Spanagonicus albofasciatus (Reuter, 1907) (whitemarked fleahopper)
- Spanagonicus argentinus Berg, 1883
- Spanagonicus aricanus Carvalho, 1984
- Spanagonicus schusterus Menard, 2015
- Spanagonicus tiquiensis Carvalho & Carpintero, 1990
