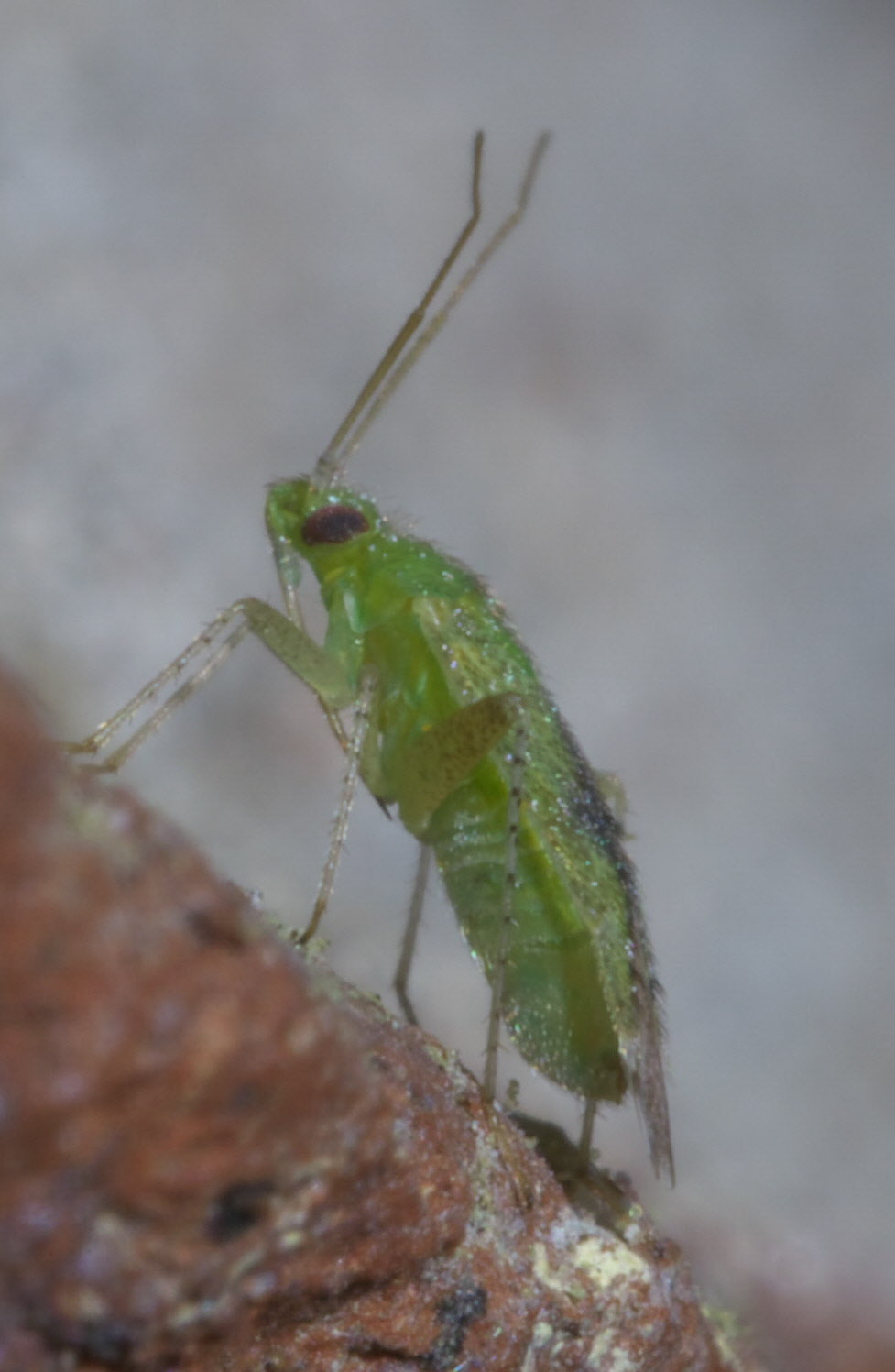
- Keltonia tuckeri

Scientific classification
- Kingdom: Animalia
- Phylum: Arthropoda
- Clade: Pancrustacea
- Class: Insecta
- Order: Hemiptera
- Suborder: Heteroptera
- Family: Miridae
- Subfamily: Phylinae
- Tribe: Phylini
- Genus: Keltonia; Knight, 1966

= Keltonia =

Genus of true bugs

Keltonia is a genus of plant bugs in the family Miridae. There are about 13 described species in Keltonia.

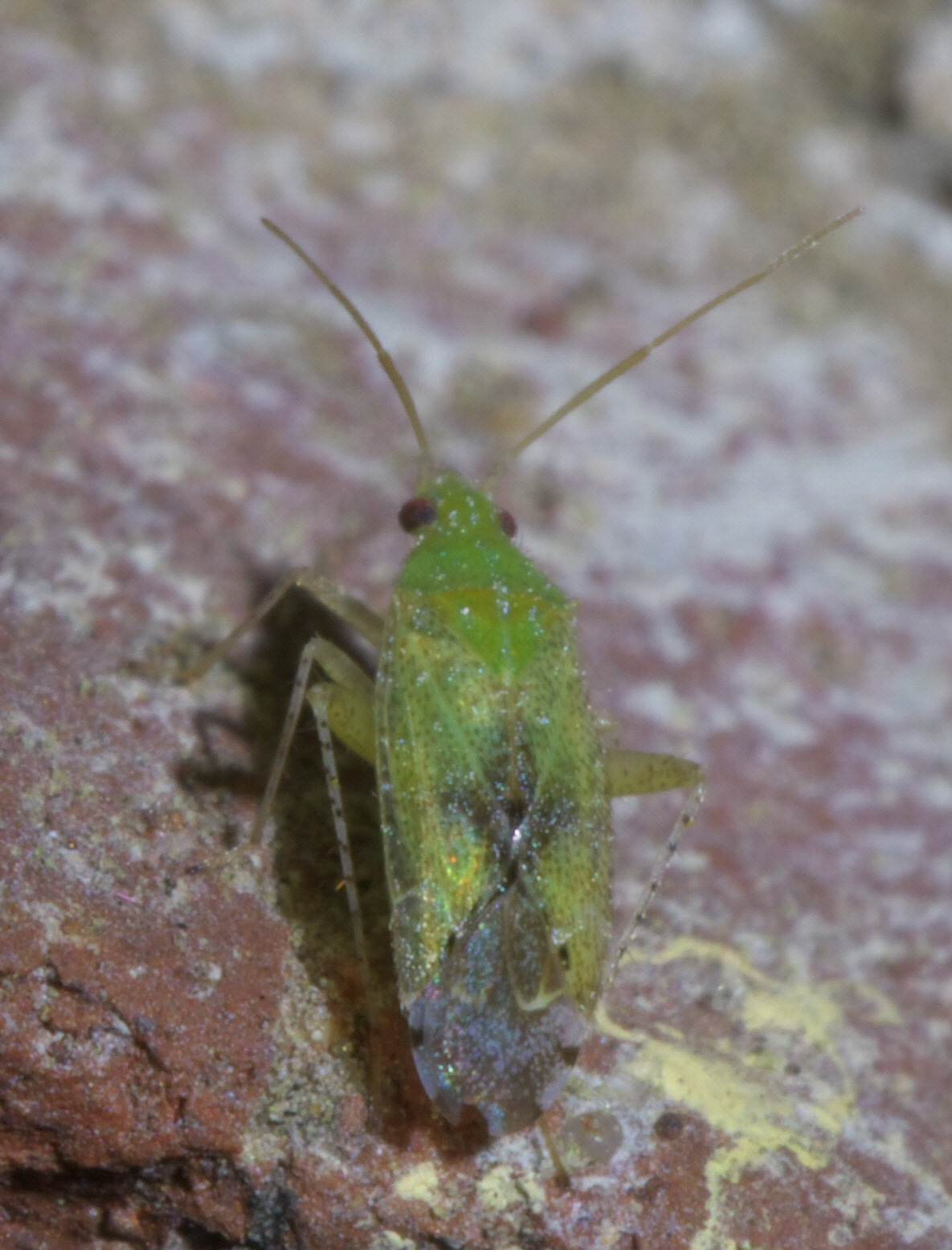
Keltonia tuckeri

== Species ==
These 13 species belong to the genus Keltonia:

- Keltonia balli (Knight, 1926)
- Keltonia bifurca Henry, 1991
- Keltonia clinopodii Kelton, 1966
- Keltonia knighti Kelton, 1966
- Keltonia mexicana Henry, 1991
- Keltonia pallida Henry, 1991
- Keltonia robusta Henry, 1991
- Keltonia rubrofemorata Knight, 1966
- Keltonia schaffneri Henry, 1991
- Keltonia steineri Henry, 1991
- Keltonia sulphurea (Reuter, 1907)
- Keltonia tuckeri (Poppius, 1911)
- Keltonia wheeleri Henry, 2002
