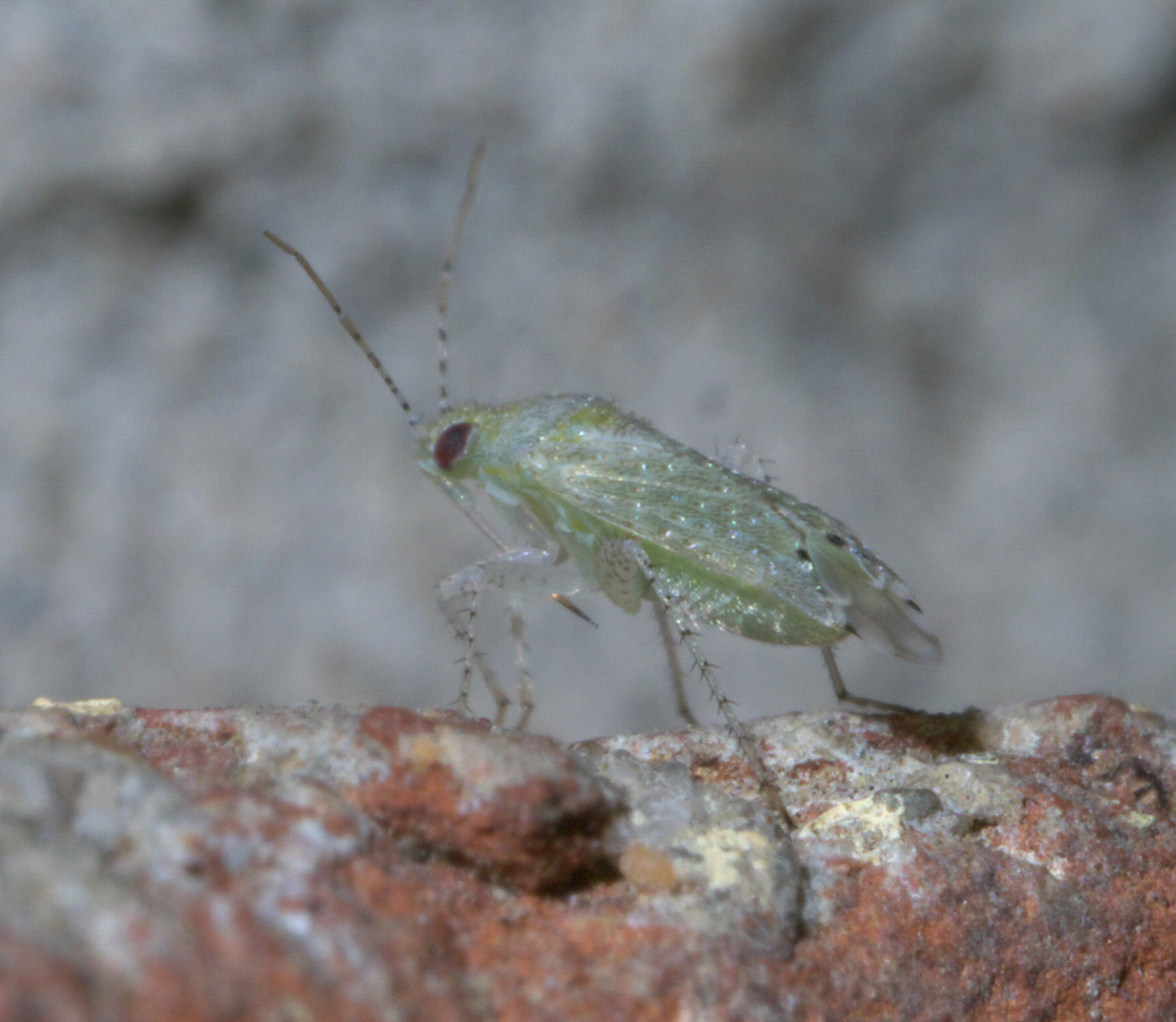
- Pseudatomoscelis seriatus

Scientific classification
- Kingdom: Animalia
- Phylum: Arthropoda
- Clade: Pancrustacea
- Class: Insecta
- Order: Hemiptera
- Suborder: Heteroptera
- Family: Miridae
- Subfamily: Phylinae
- Tribe: Phylini
- Genus: Pseudatomoscelis; Poppius, 1911

= Pseudatomoscelis =

Genus of true bugs

Pseudatomoscelis is a genus of plant bugs in the family Miridae. There are at least four described species in Pseudatomoscelis.

== Species ==
These four species belong to the genus Pseudatomoscelis:

- Pseudatomoscelis flora (Van Duzee, 1923)
- Pseudatomoscelis insularis Henry, 1991
- Pseudatomoscelis nubila T.Henry, 2002
- Pseudatomoscelis seriatus (Reuter, 1876) (cotton fleahopper)
