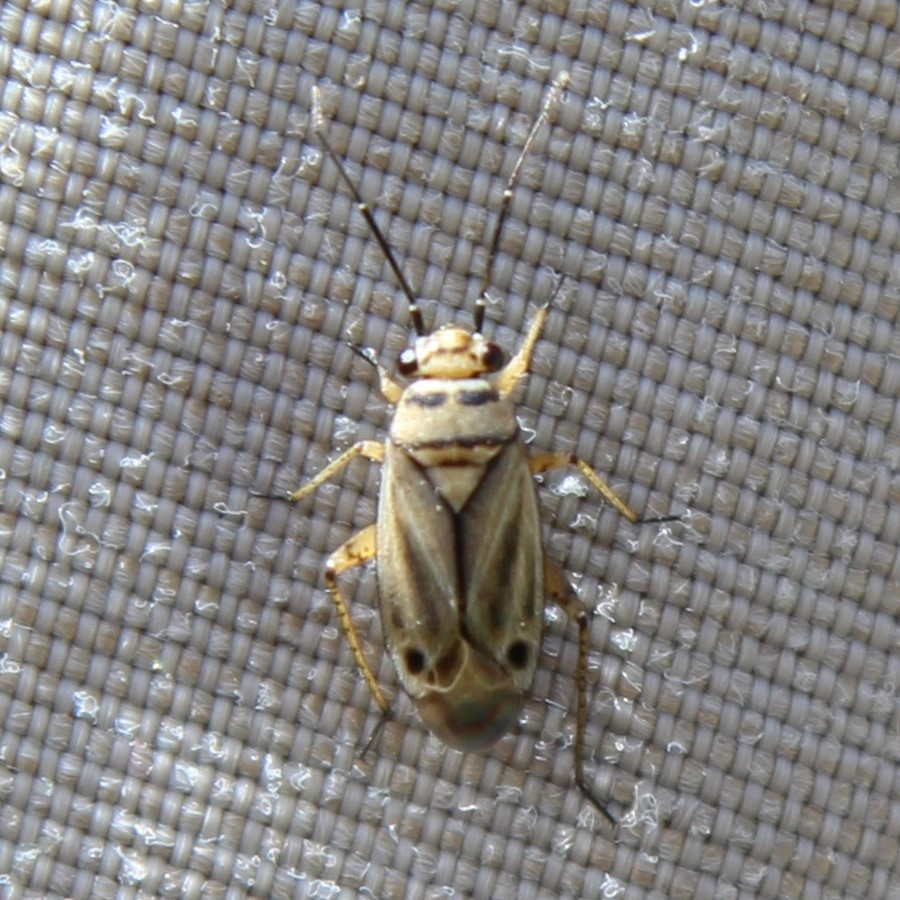

Scientific classification
- Kingdom: Animalia
- Phylum: Arthropoda
- Clade: Pancrustacea
- Class: Insecta
- Order: Hemiptera
- Suborder: Heteroptera
- Family: Miridae
- Subfamily: Phylinae
- Tribe: Phylini
- Genus: Phyllopidea; Knight, 1919

= Phyllopidea =

Genus of true bugs

Phyllopidea is a genus of plant bugs in the family Miridae. There are at least four described species in the genus Phyllopidea.

== Species ==
These four species belong to the genus Phyllopidea:

- Phyllopidea hirta (Van Duzee, 1916)
- Phyllopidea montana Knight, 1968
- Phyllopidea picta (Uhler, 1893)
- Phyllopidea utahensis Knight, 1968
