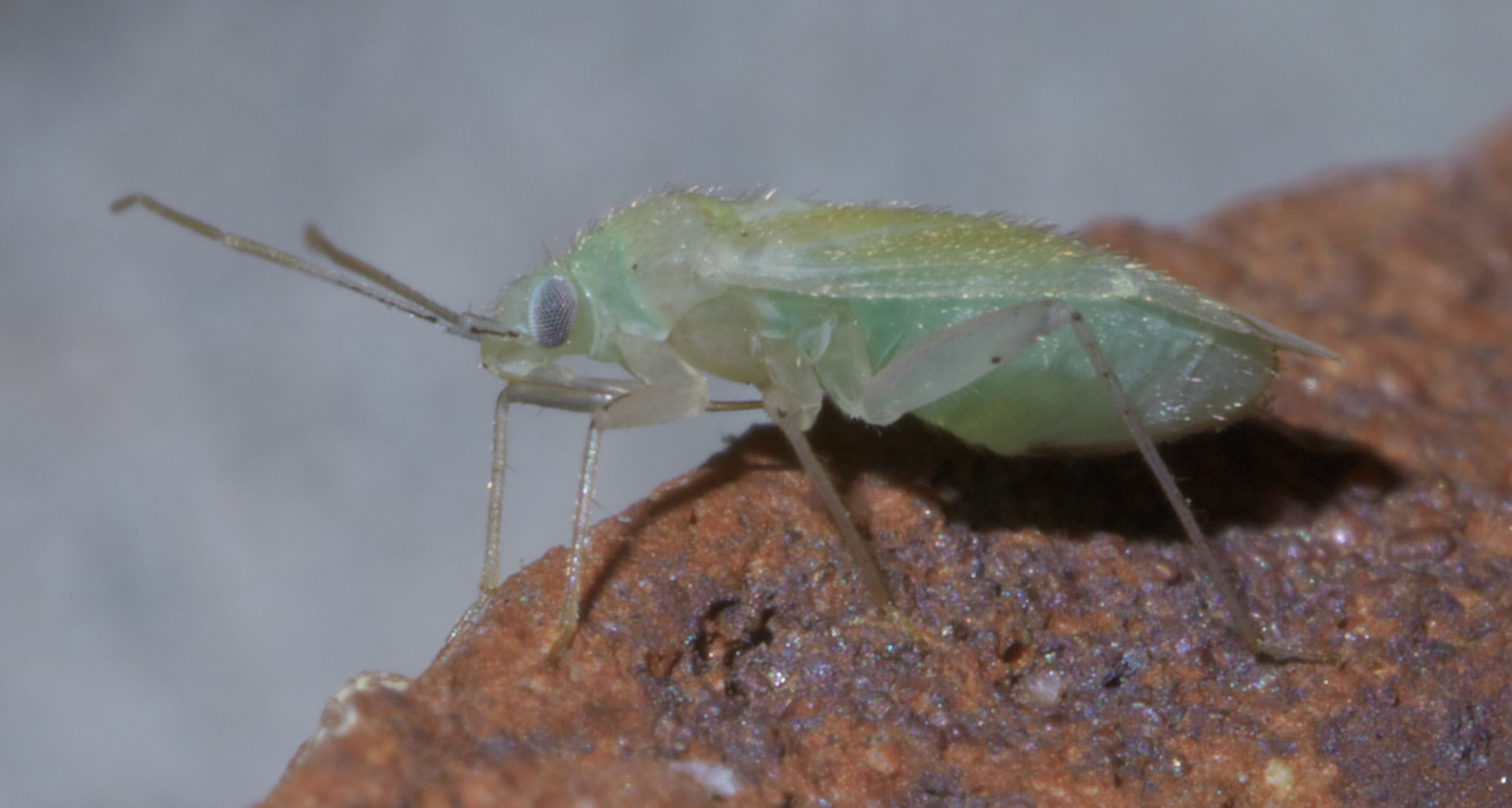

Scientific classification
- Kingdom: Animalia
- Phylum: Arthropoda
- Clade: Pancrustacea
- Class: Insecta
- Order: Hemiptera
- Suborder: Heteroptera
- Family: Miridae
- Subfamily: Phylinae
- Tribe: Phylini
- Genus: Americodema; Henry, 2000

= Americodema =

Genus of true bugs

Americodema is a genus of plant bugs in the family Miridae. There are at least two described species in Americodema.

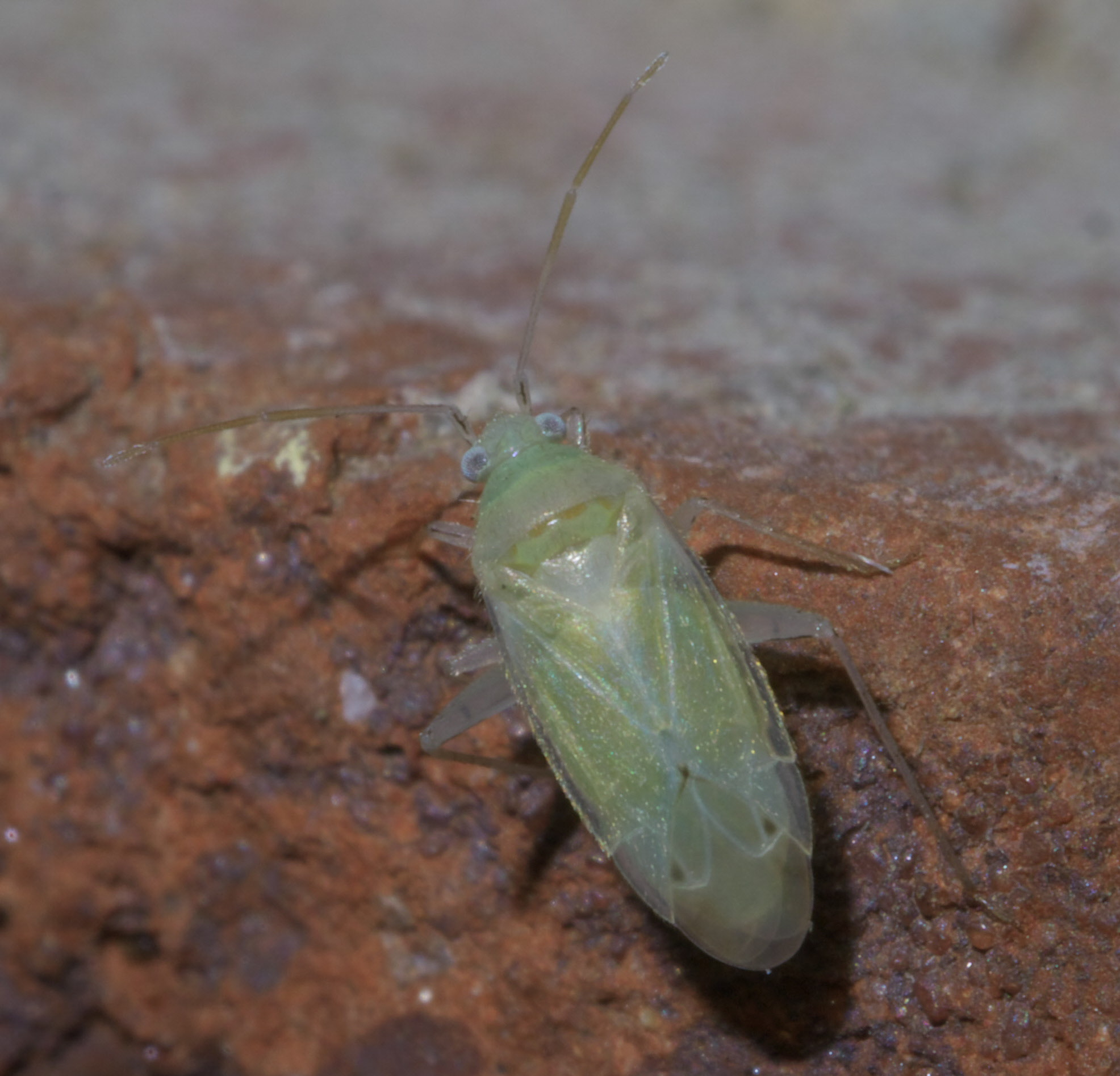

== Species ==
These two species belong to the genus Americodema:

- Americodema knighti (Kerzhner & Schuh, 1998)
- Americodema nigrolineatum (Knight, 1923)
