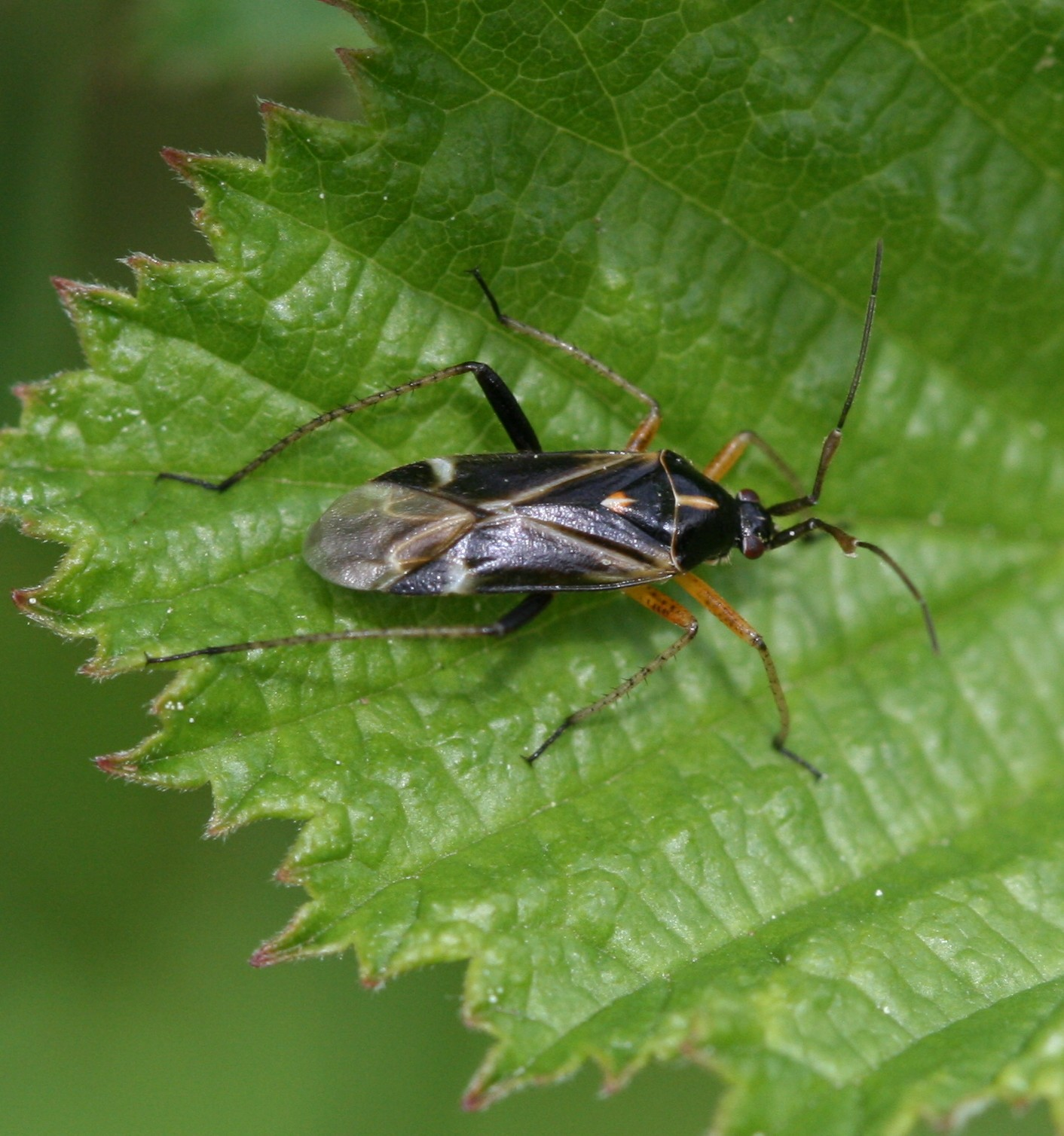
- Harpocera thoracica, male

Scientific classification
- Kingdom: Animalia
- Phylum: Arthropoda
- Class: Insecta
- Order: Hemiptera
- Suborder: Heteroptera
- Family: Miridae
- Genus: Harpocera
- Species: H. thoracica

Binomial name
- Harpocera thoracica (Fallén, 1807)

= Harpocera thoracica =

Species of true bug

Harpocera thoracica is a species of bug from Miridae family.

== Distribution ==
This rather common species could be found anywhere in Europe except for the Baltic states, Canary Islands, Finland, Iceland, Malta, and Russia.

== Habitat ==
These bugs inhabit hedge rows and sunny, dry areas with oaks.

== Description ==
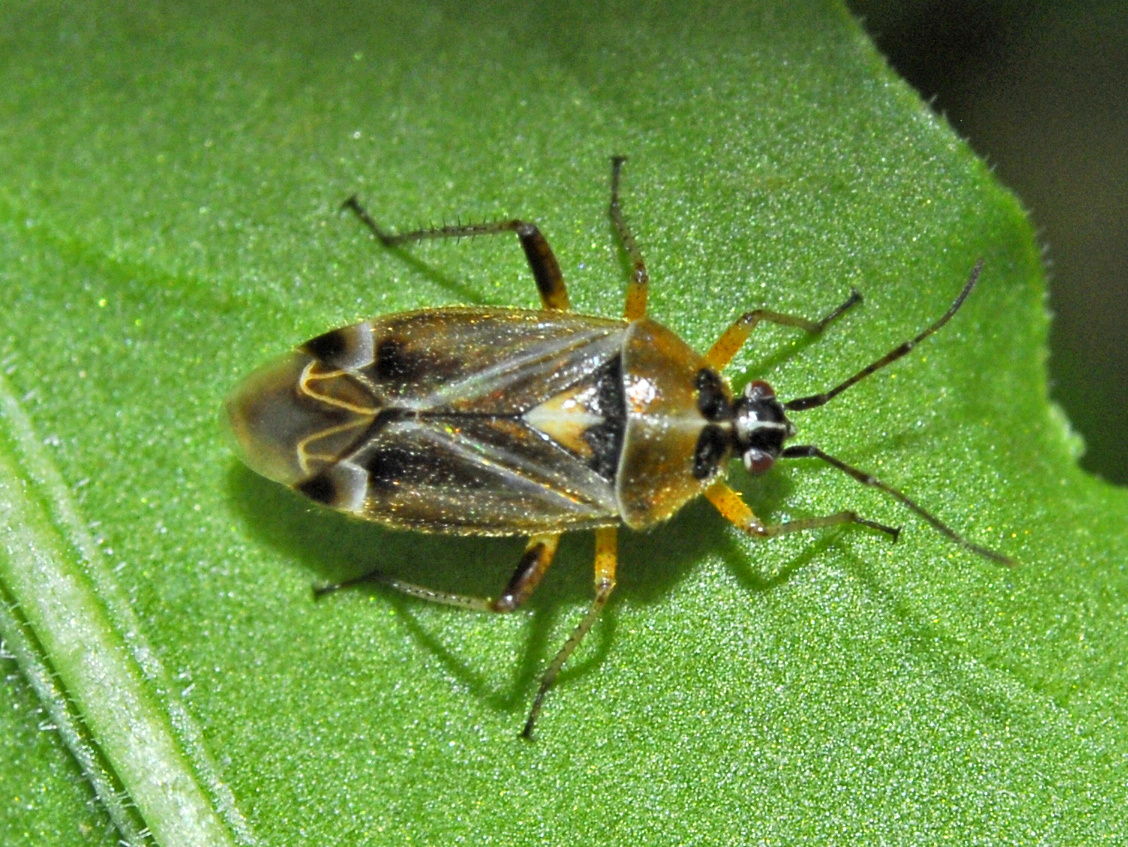
Harpocera thoracica, female

Harpocera thoracica can reach a length of about 6–6.4 millimetres (0.24–0.25 in) in males, of 6.4–6.8 millimetres (0.25–0.27 in) in females. An evident dimorphism exists between the males and the females of this species. Males show a more elongated body, longer tibiae and a characteristic inflated 2nd antennal segment.

The basic body color of these bugs ranges from black, dark brown or orange to pale brown. The tips of hemelytra are black, surrounded by white markings. Legs are yellowish-brown and antennae are brown.

The nymphs have dark hairs and thickened basal antennal segments. They are reddish or pinkish-white-coloured.

== Ecology ==
Adults can be found from late April or May to the middle of June at the latest and live for only one month, with females living a bit longer. These zoo phytophagous bugs suck on buds, feed on pollen and on juices of oaks (Quercus robur), feed on nectar of Anthriscus sylvestris and occasionally hunt small insects, especially aphids. After the eggs have been deposited, they remain for 10 months. After the species spend their time in the egg, larvae appear. The larva development takes no more than two weeks. As that time passes, nymphs appear. Males are victims of ultra-violet lights, and may be found in moth traps.
