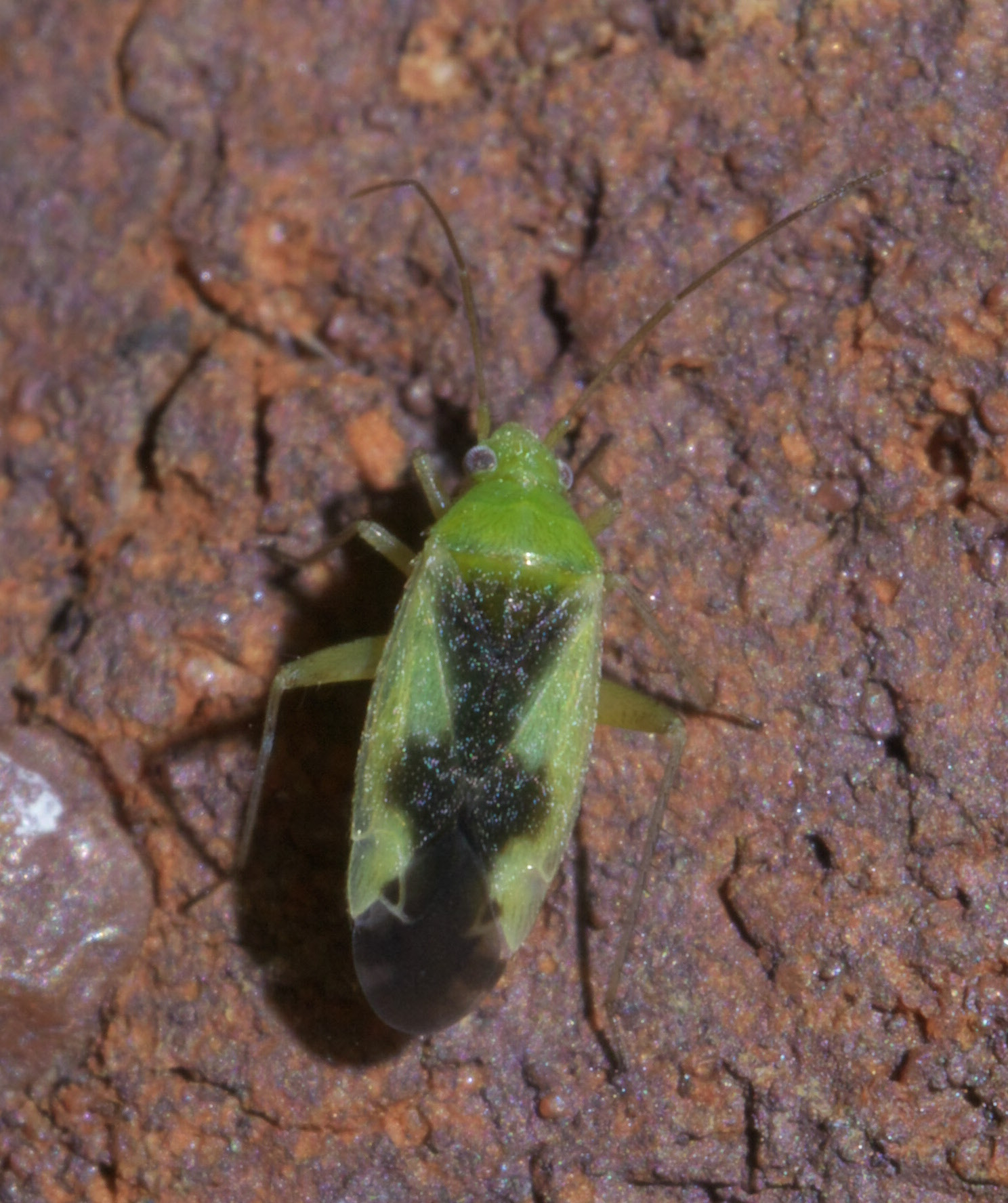
- Reuteroscopus ornatus, ornate plant bug

Scientific classification
- Kingdom: Animalia
- Phylum: Arthropoda
- Clade: Pancrustacea
- Class: Insecta
- Order: Hemiptera
- Suborder: Heteroptera
- Family: Miridae
- Subfamily: Phylinae
- Tribe: Phylini
- Genus: Reuteroscopus; Kirkaldy, 1905

Synonyms
- Aristoreuteria Kirkaldy, 1906; Episcopus Reuter, 1876

= Reuteroscopus =

Genus of true bugs

Reuteroscopus is a genus of plant bugs in the family Miridae. There are more than 50 described species in Reuteroscopus, found in North, Central, and South America.

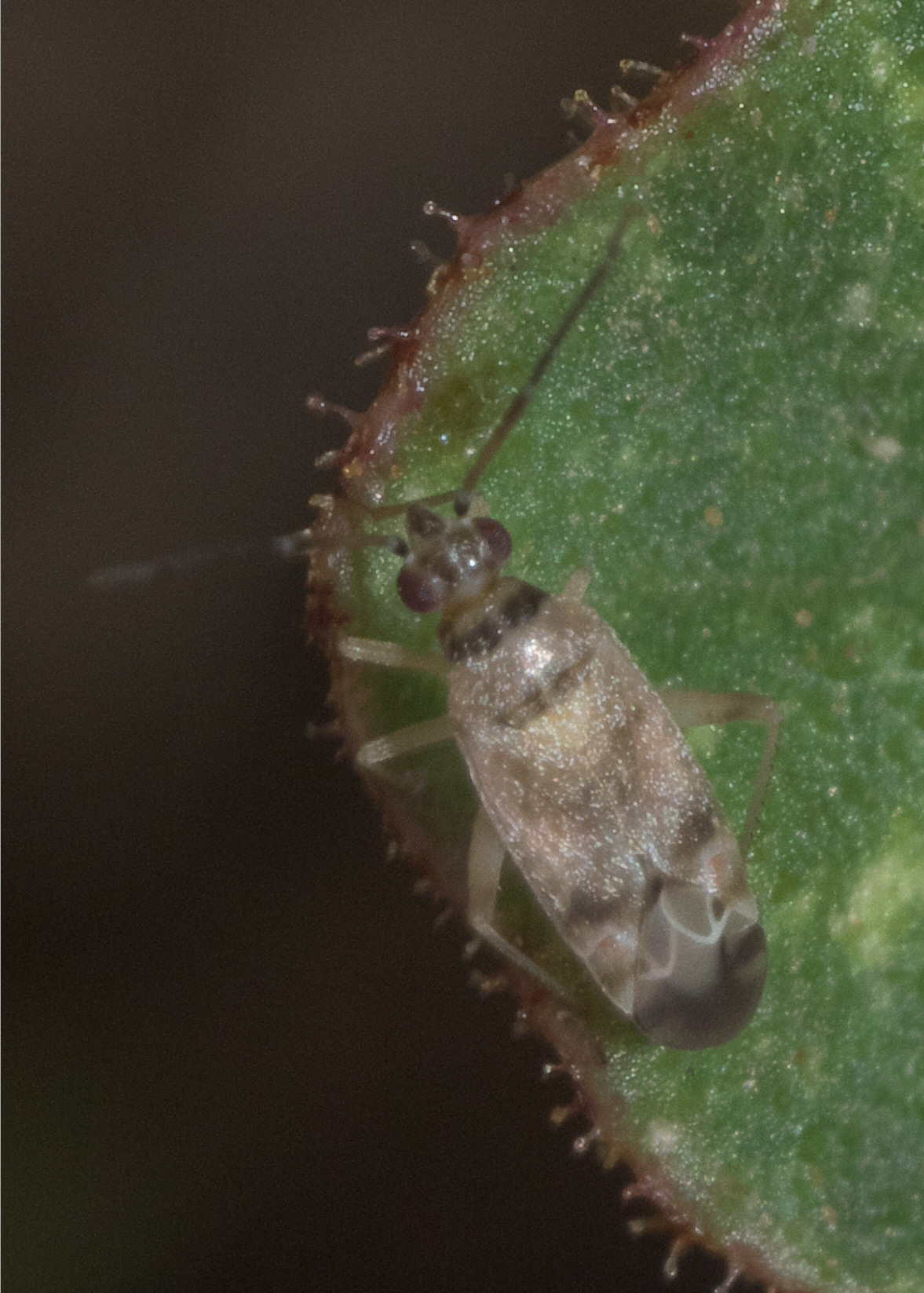
Reuteroscopus tinctipennis, Arizona

== Species ==
These 54 species belong to the genus Reuteroscopus:

- Reuteroscopus abroniae Knight, 1965
- Reuteroscopus antennatus Kelton, 1964
- Reuteroscopus aztecus Kelton, 1964
- Reuteroscopus basicornis Knight, 1965
- Reuteroscopus brevicornis Knight, 1965
- Reuteroscopus brevirostris Knight, 1965
- Reuteroscopus brevis Knight, 1965
- Reuteroscopus burkei Knight, 1965
- Reuteroscopus cacerensis Carvalho, 1985
- Reuteroscopus carmelitanus Carvalho, 1984
- Reuteroscopus carolinae Knight, 1965
- Reuteroscopus carvalhoi Maldonado & Poinar, 1995
- Reuteroscopus chillcotti Kelton, 1964
- Reuteroscopus cisandinus Carvalho, 1984
- Reuteroscopus complexus Kelton, 1964
- Reuteroscopus croceus Knight, 1965
- Reuteroscopus cuernavacae Knight, 1965
- Reuteroscopus curacaoensis Kelton, 1964
- Reuteroscopus diffusus Kelton, 1964
- Reuteroscopus digitatus Kelton, 1964
- Reuteroscopus dreisbachi Knight, 1965
- Reuteroscopus ecuadorensis Carvalho, 1984
- Reuteroscopus femoralis Kelton, 1964
- Reuteroscopus froeschneri Knight, 1953
- Reuteroscopus fuscatus Knight, 1965
- Reuteroscopus goianus Carvalho, 1984
- Reuteroscopus gracilifornis Knight, 1965
- Reuteroscopus grandis Knight, 1965
- Reuteroscopus guaranianus Carvalho, 1984
- Reuteroscopus hamatus Kelton, 1964
- Reuteroscopus immaculatus Knight, 1965
- Reuteroscopus leonensis Carvalho & Costa, 1992
- Reuteroscopus longirostris Knight, 1925
- Reuteroscopus luteus Knight, 1965
- Reuteroscopus matogrossensis Carvalho, 1984
- Reuteroscopus medius Knight, 1965
- Reuteroscopus mexicanus Kelton, 1964
- Reuteroscopus michoacanus Carvalho & Costa, 1992
- Reuteroscopus nicholi (Knight, 1930)
- Reuteroscopus nigricornis Knight, 1965
- Reuteroscopus oaxacae Knight, 1965
- Reuteroscopus obscurus Knight, 1965
- Reuteroscopus ornatus (Reuter, 1876) (ornate plant bug)
- Reuteroscopus pallidiclavus Knight, 1965
- Reuteroscopus paraensis Carvalho, 1984
- Reuteroscopus peruanus Carvalho & Melendez, 1986
- Reuteroscopus santaritae Knight, 1965
- Reuteroscopus schaffneri Knight, 1965
- Reuteroscopus similis Kelton, 1964
- Reuteroscopus sonorensis Carvalho, 1990
- Reuteroscopus tinctipennis (Knight, 1925)
- Reuteroscopus uvidus (Distant, 1893)
- Reuteroscopus venezuelanus Carvalho, 1984
- Reuteroscopus villaverdeae Carvalho, 1990
