= Psallovius =

Scientific classification
- Kingdom: Animalia
- Phylum: Arthropoda
- Clade: Pancrustacea
- Class: Insecta
- Order: Hemiptera
- Suborder: Heteroptera
- Family: Miridae
- Subfamily: Phylinae
- Tribe: Phylini
- Genus: Psallovius; Henry, 1999

Genus of true bugs

Psallovius is a genus of plant bugs in the family Miridae. There are about five described species in Psallovius.

== Species ==
These five species belong to the genus Psallovius:

- Psallovius dimorphicus Schwartz & Schuh, 1999
- Psallovius flaviclavus (Knight, 1930)
- Psallovius nigroantennatus Schwartz & Schuh, 1999
- Psallovius piceicola (Knight, 1923)
- Psallovius rubrofemoratus (Knight, 1930)
