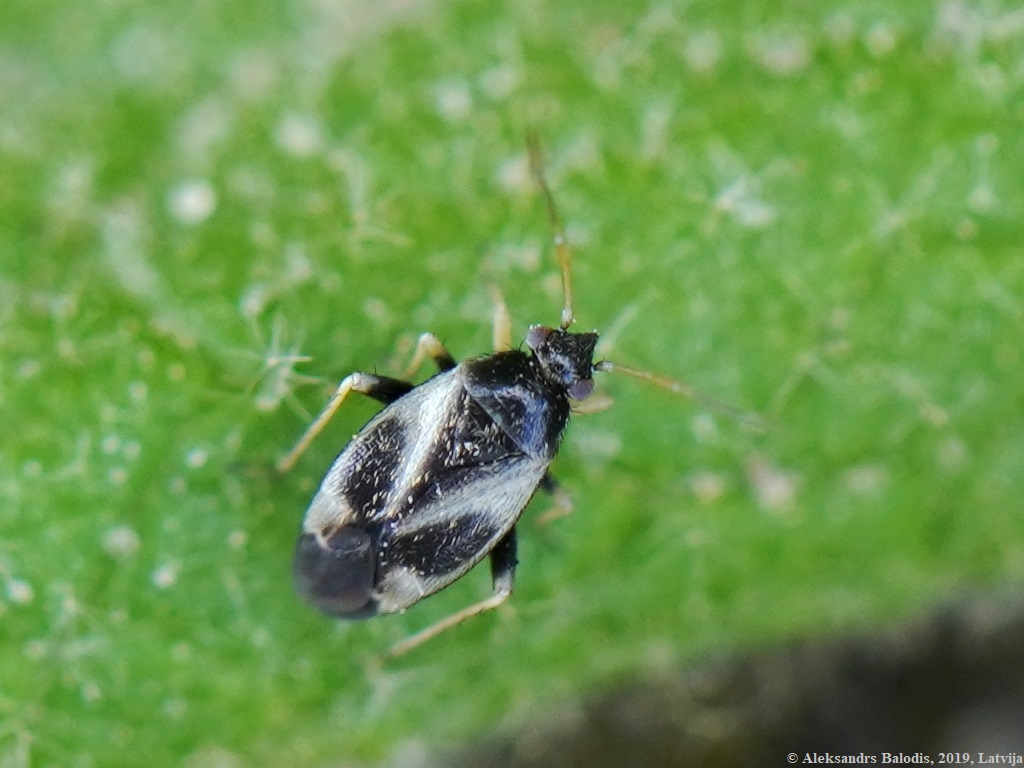
- Criocoris quadrimaculatus

Scientific classification
- Kingdom: Animalia
- Phylum: Arthropoda
- Clade: Pancrustacea
- Class: Insecta
- Order: Hemiptera
- Suborder: Heteroptera
- Family: Miridae
- Subfamily: Phylinae
- Genus: Criocoris; Fieber, 1858

Synonyms
- Laodamia Kirkaldy, 1903

= Criocoris =

Genus of true bugs

Criocoris is a genus of plant bugs in the family Miridae. There are about 13 described species in Criocoris.

== Species ==
These 13 species belong to the genus Criocoris:

- Criocoris contrastus Seidenstucker, 1970
- Criocoris crassicornis (Hahn, 1834)
- Criocoris longicornis Reuter, 1883
- Criocoris morio Reuter, 1894
- Criocoris nigricornis Reuter, 1894
- Criocoris nigripes Fieber, 1861
- Criocoris piceicornis Wagner, 1950
- Criocoris quadrimaculatus (Fallén, 1807)
- Criocoris saliens (Reuter, 1876) (salien plant bug)
- Criocoris sibiricus Kerzhner, 1984
- Criocoris sulcicornis (Kirschbaum, 1856)
- Criocoris tesquorum Kerzhner, 1984
- Criocoris variegatus Stichel, 1934
