= Hoplomachidea =

Scientific classification
- Kingdom: Animalia
- Phylum: Arthropoda
- Clade: Pancrustacea
- Class: Insecta
- Order: Hemiptera
- Suborder: Heteroptera
- Family: Miridae
- Subfamily: Phylinae
- Genus: Hoplomachidea; Reuter, 1909
- Species: H. consors

Binomial name
- Hoplomachidea consors (Uhler, 1893)

Genus of true bugs

Hoplomachidea is a genus of plant bugs in the family Miridae. There is one described species in Hoplomachidea, H. consors.
