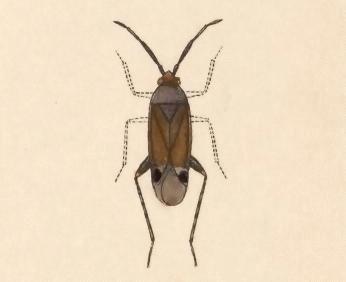
- Ranzovius crinitus

Scientific classification
- Kingdom: Animalia
- Phylum: Arthropoda
- Clade: Pancrustacea
- Class: Insecta
- Order: Hemiptera
- Suborder: Heteroptera
- Family: Miridae
- Tribe: Phylini
- Genus: Ranzovius; Distant, 1893

Synonyms
- Nyctella Reuter, 1905

= Ranzovius (bug) =

Genus of true bugs

Ranzovius is a genus of plant bugs in the family Miridae. There are about 10 described species in Ranzovius.

== Species ==
These 10 species belong to the genus Ranzovius:

- Ranzovius agelenopsis Henry, 1984^{i c g}
- Ranzovius bicolor T. Henry, 1999^{c g}
- Ranzovius brailovskyi T. Henry, 1999^{c g}
- Ranzovius californicus (Van Duzee, 1917)^{i c g b}
- Ranzovius clavicornis (Knight, 1927)^{i c g b}
- Ranzovius crinitus Distant, 1893^{i c g}
- Ranzovius fennahi Carvalho, 1954^{c g}
- Ranzovius mexicanus (Van Duzee, 1923)^{c g}
- Ranzovius moerens (Reuter, 1905)^{c g}
- Ranzovius stysi T. Henry, 1999^{c g}

Data sources: i = ITIS, c = Catalogue of Life, g = GBIF, b = Bugguide.net
