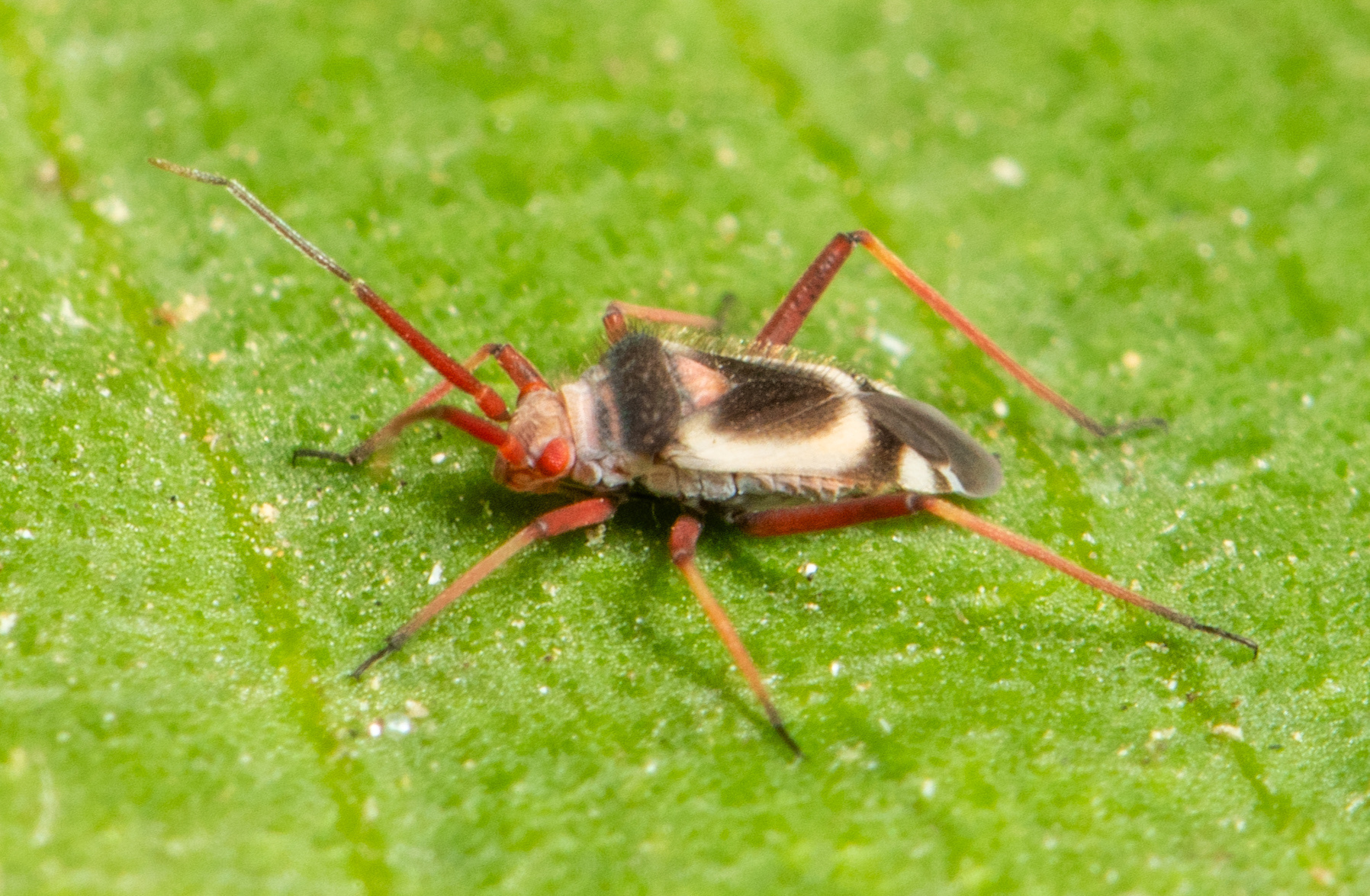
- Photo of Semium Hirtum

Scientific classification
- Kingdom: Animalia
- Phylum: Arthropoda
- Clade: Pancrustacea
- Class: Insecta
- Order: Hemiptera
- Suborder: Heteroptera
- Family: Miridae
- Subfamily: Phylinae
- Genus: Semium; Reuter, 1876

= Semium =

Genus of true bugs

Semium is a genus of plant bugs in the family Miridae. There are about seven described species in Semium.

== Species ==
These seven species belong to the genus Semium:

- Semium brailovskyi Schuh, 2017
- Semium guatemalanus Carvalho, 1976
- Semium hirtum Reuter, 1876
- Semium rubronotum Kelton, 1959
- Semium subglaber Knight & Slater, 1927
- Semium subglabrum Knight, 1927
- Semium villosum Kelton, 1973
