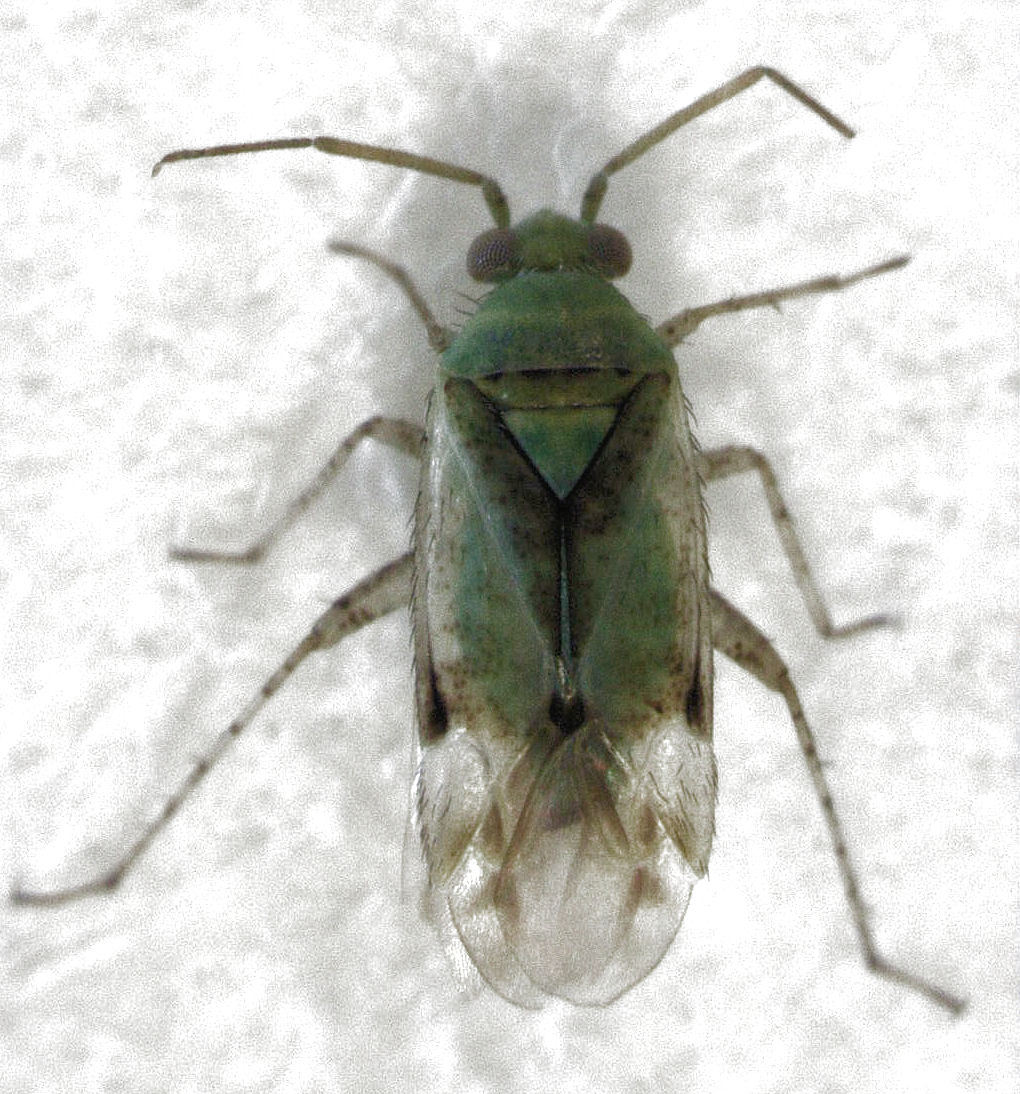
- Leptidolon galbanus

Scientific classification
- Kingdom: Animalia
- Phylum: Arthropoda
- Class: Insecta
- Order: Hemiptera
- Suborder: Heteroptera
- Family: Miridae
- Subfamily: Phylinae
- Genus: Leptidolon; Reuter, 1905

= Leptidolon =

Genus of true bugs

Leptidolon is a genus of plant bug. Species include Leptidolon galbanus.

== Synonyms ==
- Polyozus Eyles & Schuh, 2003
