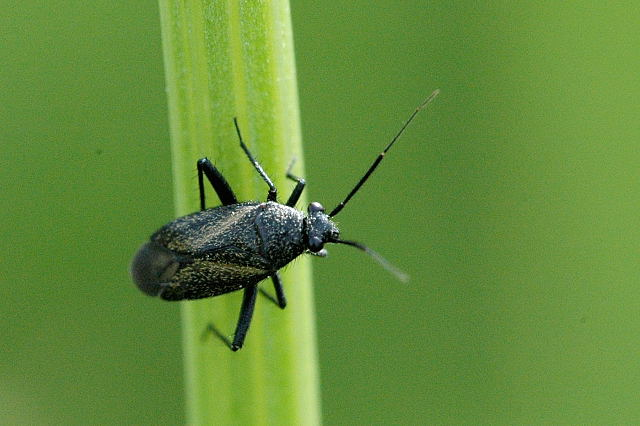
- Atractotomus magnicornis

Scientific classification
- Domain: Eukaryota
- Kingdom: Animalia
- Phylum: Arthropoda
- Class: Insecta
- Order: Hemiptera
- Suborder: Heteroptera
- Family: Miridae
- Subfamily: Phylinae; Douglas & Scott, 1865

= Phylinae =

Subfamily of true bugs

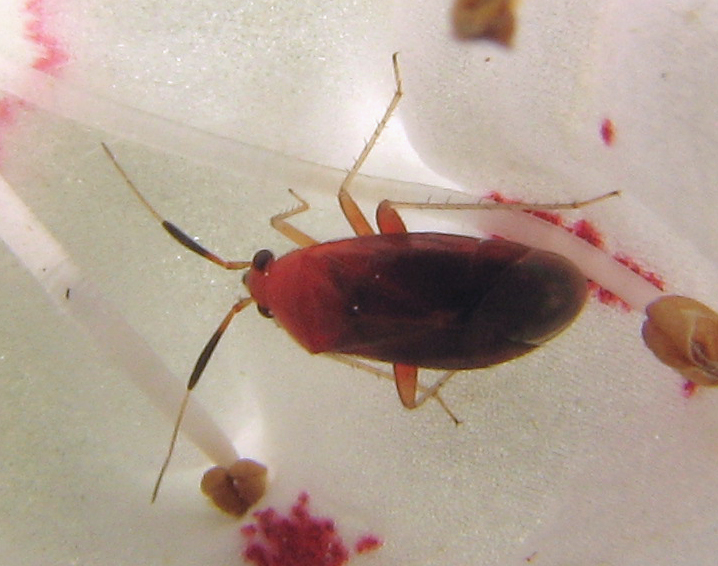
Rhinocapsus vanduzeei

Phylinae is a subfamily of the plant bug family Miridae. Species of this family are found worldwide.

In research published in 2013, the subfamily Phylinae was reorganized. The tribe Auricillocorini is now considered a synonym of Hallodapini, and the tribe Pronotocrepini a synonym of the subtribe Cremnorrhina. New tribes were created under the new or resurrected names Decomiini, Exocarpocorini, Cremnorrhini, Nasocorini, and Semiini. The revised subfamily consists of nine tribes containing around 400 genera and over 2000 species.

Subfamily Phylinae Douglas & Scott, 1865
Tribe Cremnorrhinini Reuter, 1883 (sometimes spelled "Cremnorrhini")

Subtribe Coatonocapsina Schuh & Menard, 2013
Subtribe Cremnorrhina Reuter, 1883

Tribe Decomiini Schuh & Menard, 2013
Tribe Exaeretini Futon, 1875
Tribe Hallodapini Van Duzee, 1916
Tribe Leucophoropterini Schuh, 1974

Subtribe Leucophoropterina Schuh, 1974
Subtribe Tuxedoina Schuh & Menard, 2013

Tribe Nasocorini Reuter, 1883
Tribe Phylini Douglas & Scott, 1865

Subtribe Keltoniina Schuh & Menard, 2013
Subtribe Oncotylina Douglas & Scott, 1865
Subtribe Phylina Douglas & Scott, 1865

Tribe Pilophorini Douglas & Scott, 1876
Tribe Semiini Knight, 1923

Subtribe Exocarpocorina Schuh & Menard, 2013
Subtribe Semiina Knight, 1923

== Genera ==
Phylinae contains the following genera:

Subfamily Phylinae Douglas & Scott, 1865
Tribe Cremnorrhinini Reuter, 1883

Subtribe Coatonocapsina Schuh & Menard, 2013

Genus Austropsallus Schuh, 1974
Genus Capecapsus Schuh, 1974
Genus Coatonocapsus Schuh, 1974
Genus Heterocapillus Wagner, 1960
Genus Parasciodema Poppius, 1914

Subtribe Cremnorrhinina Reuter, 1883

Genus Amblytylus Fieber, 1858
Genus Brachyceratocoris Knight, 1968
Genus Calidroides Schwartz, 2005
Genus Coquillettia Uhler, 1890
Genus Cremnorrhinus Reuter, 1880
Genus Dacota Uhler, 1872
Genus Denticulophallus Schuh, 1974
Genus Ethelastia Reuter, 1876
Genus Euderon Puton, 1888
Genus Excentricoris Carvalho, 1955
Genus Guentherocoris Schuh & Schwartz, 2004
Genus Harpocera Curtis, 1838
Genus Leutiola Wyniger, 2012
Genus Lopidodenus V. Putshkov, 1974
Genus Lopus Hahn, 1833
Genus Macrotylus Fieber, 1858
Genus Orectoderus Uhler, 1876
Genus Pachyxyphus Fieber, 1858
Genus Paralopus Wagner, 1957
Genus Pronotocrepis Knight, 1929
Genus Shendina Linnavuori, 1975
Genus Strophopoda Van Duzee, 1916
Genus Teleorhinus Uhler, 1890
Genus Ticua Wyniger, 2012
Genus Utopnia Reuter, 1881
Genus Zinjolopus Linnavuori, 1975

Tribe Decomiini Schuh & Menard, 2013

Genus Aurantiocoris Schuh & Schwartz, 2004
Genus Decomia Poppius, 1915
Genus Decomioides Schuh, 1984
Genus Malaysiamiris Schuh, 1984
Genus Malaysiamiroides Schuh, 1984
Genus Rubrocuneocoris Schuh, 1984

Tribe Exaeretini Futon, 1875

Genus Anonychiella Reuter, 1912
Genus Aphaenophyes Reuter, 1899
Genus Atractotomimus Kiritshenko, 1952
Genus Auchenocrepis Fieber, 1858
Genus Brendaphylus Yasunaga, 2013
Genus Camptotylus Fieber, 1860
Genus Camptozorus Kerzhner, 1996
Genus Chrysochnoodes Reuter, 1901
Genus Compsonannus Reuter, 1902
Genus Eumecotarsus Kerzhner, 1962
Genus Eurycranella Reuter, 1904
Genus Frotaphylus Carvalho, 1984
Genus Gonoporomiris Henry & Schuh, 2002
Genus Hadrophyes Puton, 1874
Genus Hyalopsallus Carvalho & Schaffner, 1973
Genus Megalodactylus Fieber, 1858
Genus Moissonia Reuter, 1894
Genus Opuna Kirkaldy, 1902
Genus Pastocoris Reuter, 1879
Genus Psallopsis Reuter, 1901
Genus Randallopsallus Yasunaga, 2013
Genus Tuponia Reuter, 1875
Genus Voruchiella Poppius, 1912
Genus Yotvata Linnavuori, 1964

Tribe Hallodapini Van Duzee, 1916

Genus Acrorrhinium Noualhier, 1895
Genus Aeolocoris Reuter, 1903
Genus Alloeomimus Reuter, 1910
Genus Artchawakomius Yasunaga, 2012
Genus Aspidacanthus Reuter, 1901
Genus Auricillocoris Schuh, 1984
Genus Azizus Distant, 1910
Genus Bibundiella Poppius, 1914
Genus Boopidella Reuter, 1907
Genus Carinogulus Schuh, 1974
Genus Chaetocapsus Poppius, 1914
Genus Clapmarius Distant, 1904
Genus Cleotomiris Schuh, 1984
Genus Cleotomiroides Schuh, 1984
Genus Cremnocephalus Eieber, 1860
Genus Cyrtopeltocoris Reuter, 1876
Genus Diocoris Kirkaldy, 1902
Genus Eminoculus Schuh, 1974
Genus Formicopsella Poppius, 1914
Genus Gampsodema Odhiambo, 1960
Genus Glaphyrocoris Reuter, 1903
Genus Hadrodapus Linnavuori, 1996
Genus Hallodapomimus Herczek, 2000
Genus Hallodapus Eieber, 1858
Genus Ifephylus Linnavuori, 1993
Genus Kapoetius Schmitz, 1969
Genus Laemocoris Reuter, 1879
Genus Leaina Linnavuori, 1974
Genus Leptomimus Herczek & Popov, 2010
Genus Lestonisca Carvalho, 1988
Genus Linacoris Carvalho, 1983
Genus Lissocapsus Bergroth, 1903
Genus Malgacheocoris Carvalho, 1952
Genus Mimocoris J. Scott, 1872
Genus Myombea China & Carvalho, 1951
Genus Myrmicomimus Reuter, 1881
Genus Neolaemocoris Wagner, 1975
Genus Omphalonotus Reuter, 1876
Genus Pangania Poppius, 1914
Genus Paralaemocoris Linnavuori, 1964
Genus Phoradendrepulus Polhemus & Polhemus, 1985
Genus Podullahas Schuh, 1984
Genus Pongocoris Linnavuori, 1975
Genus Ribautocapsus Wagner, 1962
Genus Ruwaba Linnavuori, 1975
Genus Skukuza Schuh, 1974
Genus Sohenus Distant, 1910
Genus Syngonus Bergroth, 1926
Genus Systellonotidea Poppius, 1914
Genus Systellonotopsis Poppius, 1914
Genus Systellonotus Pieber, 1858
Genus Trichophorella Reuter, 1905
Genus Trichophthalmocapsus Poppius, 1914
Genus Vitsikamiris Polhemus, 1994
Genus Wygomiris Schuh, 1984
Genus Zaratus Distant, 1909

Tribe Leucophoropterini Schuh, 1974

Subtribe Leucophoropterina Schuh, 1974

Genus Abuyogocoris Schuh, 1984
Genus Aitkenia Carvalho & Gross, 1982
Genus Arafuramiris Schuh, 1984
Genus Ausejanus Menard & Schuh, 2011
Genus Austrodapus Menard & Schuh, 2011
Genus Biromiris Schuh, 1984
Genus Blesingia Carvalho & Gross, 1982
Genus Collessicoris Carvalho & Gross, 1982
Genus Ctypomiris Schuh, 1984
Genus Gulacapsus Schuh, 1984
Genus Johnstonsonius Menard & Schuh, 2011
Genus Leucophoroptera Poppius, 1921
Genus Missanos Menard & Schuh, 2011
Genus Neaitkenia Menard & Schuh, 2011
Genus Neoleucophoroptera Menard & Schuh, 2011
Genus Papuamimus Schuh, 1984
Genus Papuamiroides Menard & Schuh, 2011
Genus Pseudohallodapocoris Schuh, 1984
Genus Sejanus Distant, 1910
Genus Solomonomimus Schuh, 1984
Genus Transleucophoroptera Menard & Schuh, 2011
Genus Trichocephalocapsus Schuh, 1984
Genus Waterhouseana Carvalho, 1973

Subtribe Tuxedoina Schuh & Menard, 2013

Genus Ephippiocoris Poppius, 1912
Genus Pseudophylus Yasunaga, 1999
Genus Tuxedo Schuh, 2001

Tribe Nasocorini Reuter, 1883

Genus Adenostomocoris Schuh & Schwartz, 2004
Genus Agrametra Buchanan-White, 1878
Genus Arctostaphylocoris Schuh & Schwartz, 2004
Genus Atomophora Reuter, 1879
Genus Atomoscelis Reuter, 1875
Genus Atractotomoidea Yasunaga, 1999
Genus Atractotomus Fieber, 1858
Genus Badezorus Distant, 1910
Genus Beckocoris Knight, 1968
Genus Bergmiris Carvalho, 1984
Genus Boopidocoris Reuter, 1879
Genus Caiganga Carvalho & Becker, 1957
Genus Camptotylidea Wagner, 1957
Genus Campylomma Reuter, 1878
Genus Chinacapsus Wagner, 1961
Genus Chlamydatus Curtis, 1833
Genus Chlamyopsallus Schwartz, 2005
Genus Hambletoniola Carvalho, 1954
Genus Helenocoris Schmitz, 1976
Genus Hirtopsallus Schmitz, 1976
Genus Insulopus Schmitz, 1976
Genus Karocris V. Putshkov, 1975
Genus Kasumiphylus Schwartz & Stonedahl, 2004
Genus Knightomiroides Stonedahl & Schwartz, 1996
Genus Lamprosthenarus Poppius, 1914
Genus Larinocerus
Genus Lattinophylus Schuh, 2008
Genus Lindbergopsallus Wagner, 1962
Genus Lopsallus Schmitz, 1976
Genus Maurodactylus Reuter, 1878
Genus Megalopsallus Knight, 1927
Genus Monosynamma J. Scott, 1864
Genus Naresthus Schmitz, 1976
Genus Nasocoris Reuter, 1879
Genus Neisopsallus Schmitz, 1976
Genus Neophylus Carvalho & Costa, 1992
Genus Nevadocoris Knight, 1968
Genus Nigrimiris Carvalho & Schaffner, 1973
Genus Nigrocapillocoris Wagner, 1973
Genus Oligobiella Reuter, 1885
Genus Orthopidea Reuter, 1899
Genus Phaxia Kerzhner, 1984
Genus Phoenicocoris Reuter, 1875
Genus Pinomiris Stonedahl & Schwartz, 1996
Genus Pruneocoris Schuh & Schwartz, 2004
Genus Psallomimus Wagner, 1951
Genus Rhinacloa Reuter, 1876
Genus Salicarus Kerzhner, 1962
Genus Solenoxyphus Reuter, 1875
Genus Spanagonicus Berg, 1883
Genus Squamophylus Carvalho & Costa, 1992
Genus Sthenaropsis Poppius, 1912
Genus Taeniophorus Linnavuori, 1952
Genus Tannerocoris Knight, 1970
Genus Tapuruyunus Carvalho, 1946
Genus Thymopsallus Linnavuori, 1975
Genus Tijucaphylus Carvalho & Costa, 1992
Genus Tunisiella Carapezza, 1997
Genus Voruchia Reuter, 1879

Tribe Phylini Douglas & Scott, 1865

Subtribe Keltoniina Schuh & Menard, 2013

Genus Keltonia Knight, 1966
Genus Pseudatomoscelis Poppius, 1911
Genus Reuteroscopus Kirkaldy, 1905
Genus Waupsallus Linnavuori, 1975

Subtribe Oncotylina Douglas & Scott, 1865

Genus Acrotelus Reuter, 1885
Genus Alloeotarsus Reuter, 1885
Genus Americodema T. Henry, 1999
Genus Angelopsallus Schuh, 2006
Genus Antepia Seidenstiicker, 1962
Genus Arizonapsallus Schuh, 2006
Genus Asciodema Reuter, 1878
Genus Bisulcopsallus Schuh, 2006
Genus Brachyarthrum Fieber, 1858
Genus Cariniocoris T. Henry, 1989
Genus Ceratopsallus Schuh, 2006
Genus Cercocarpopsallus Schuh, 2006
Genus Chlorillus Kerzhner, 1962
Genus Compsidolon Reuter, 1899
Genus Crassomiris Weirauch, 2006
Genus Damioscea Reuter, 1883
Genus Dasycapsus Poppius, 1912
Genus Europiella Reuter, 1909
Genus Eurycolpus Reuter, 1875
Genus Galbinocoris Weirauch, 2006
Genus Glaucopterum Wagner, 1963
Genus Hamatophylus Weirauch, 2006
Genus Hoplomachus Fieber, 1858
Genus Ihermocoris Puton, 1875
Genus Insulaphylus Weirauch, 2006
Genus Josifovius Konstantinov, 2008
Genus Kmentophylus Duwal, Yasunaga, & Lee, 2010
Genus Knightophylinia Schaffner, 1978
Genus Knightopiella Schuh, 2004
Genus Knightopsallus Schuh, 2006
Genus Leucodellus Reuter, 1906
Genus Lineatopsallus T. Henry, 1991
Genus Litoxenus Reuter, 1885
Genus Maculamiris Weirauch, 2006
Genus Malacotes Reuter, 1878
Genus Marrubiocoris Wagner, 1970
Genus Megalocoleus Reuter, 1890
Genus Moiseevichia Schuh, 2006
Genus Nanopsallus Wagner, 1952
Genus Neopsallus Schuh & Schwartz, 2004
Genus Occidentodema T. Henry, 1999
Genus Oligotylus Van Duzee, 1916
Genus Omocoris Lindberg, 1930
Genus Oncotylidea Wagner, 1965
Genus Oncotylus Fieber, 1858
Genus Opisthotaenia Reuter, 1901
Genus Oreocapsus Linnavuori, 1975
Genus Parachlorillus Wagner, 1963
Genus Parapsallus Wagner, 1952
Genus Paredrocoris Reuter, 1878
Genus Phaeochiton Kerzhner, 1964
Genus Phallospinophylus Weirauch, 2006
Genus Phyllopidea Knight, 1919
Genus Phymatopsallus Knight
Genus Piceophylus Schwartz & Schuh, 1999
Genus Pinophylus Schwartz & Schuh, 1999
Genus Placochilus Fieber, 1858
Genus Plagiognathus Fieber, 1858
Genus Plesiodema Reuter, 1875
Genus Pleuroxonotus Reuter, 1903
Genus Pronototropis Reuter, 1879
Genus Psallodema V. Putshkov, 1970
Genus Psallomorpha Duwal Yasunaga, & Lee, 2010
Genus Psallovius T. Henry
Genus Pygovepres Weirauch, 2006
Genus Quercophylus Weirauch, 2006
Genus Quernocoris Weirauch, 2006
Genus Ranzovius Distant, 1893
Genus Rhinocapsus Uhler, 1890
Genus Roburocoris Weirauch, 2009
Genus Rubellomiris Weirauch, 2006
Genus Rubeospineus Weirauch, 2006
Genus Sacculifer Kerzhner, 1959
Genus Salicopsallus Schuh, 2006
Genus Schaffneropsallus Schuh, 2006
Genus Stenoparia Fieber, 1870
Genus Sthenaropsidea Henry & Schuh, 2002
Genus Stictopsallus Schuh, 2006
Genus Stirophylus Eckerlein & Wagner, 1965
Genus Stoebea Schuh, 1974
Genus Tapirula Carapezza, 1997
Genus Tinicephalus Fieber, 1858
Genus Tragiscocoris Fieber, 1861
Genus Vanduzeephylus Schuh & Schwartz, 2004
Genus Vesperocoris Weirauch, 2006
Genus Viscacoris Weirauch, 2009
Genus Zophocnemis Kerzhner, 1962

Subtribe Phylina Douglas & Scott, 1865

Genus Adelphophylus Wagner, 1959
Genus Agraptocoris Reuter, 1903
Genus Alnopsallus Duwal, Yasunaga, & Lee, 2010
Genus Alvarengamiris Carvalho, 1991
Genus Amazonophilus Carvalho & Costa, 1993
Genus Anapsallus Odhiambo, 1960
Genus Anomalocornis Carvalho & Wygodzinsky, 1945
Genus Arlemiris Carvalho, 1984
Genus Bicurvicoris Carvalho & Schaffner, 1973
Genus Botocudomiris Carvalho, 1979
Genus Brachycranella Reuter, 1905
Genus Conostethus Fieber, 1858
Genus Crassicornus Carvalho, 1945
Genus Darectagela Linnavuori, 1975
Genus Darfuromma Linnavuori, 1975
Genus Dignaia Linnavuori, 1975
Genus Dominiquella Linnavuori, 1983
Genus Ectagela Schmidt, K., 1939
Genus Ellacapsus Yasunaga, 2013
Genus Eremophylus Yasunaga, 2001
Genus Farsiana Linnavuori, 1998
Genus Gediocoris Wagner, 1964
Genus Ghazalocoris Linnavuori, 1975
Genus Gressittocapsus Schuh, 1984
Genus Icodema Reuter, 1875
Genus Indatractus Linnavuori, 1975
Genus Izyaius Schwartz, 2006
Genus Juniperia Linnavuori, 1965
Genus Knightensis Schaffner, 1978
Genus Lalyocoris Linnavuori, 1993
Genus Lasiolabopella Schuh, 1974
Genus Lepidargyrus Muminov, 1962
Genus Lepidocapsus Poppius, 1914
Genus Leptoxanthus Reuter, 1905
Genus Liviopsallus Carapezza, 1982
Genus Mendozaphylus Carvalho & Carpintero, 1991
Genus Millerimiris Carvalho, 1951
Genus Mixtecamiris Carvalho & Schaffner, 1973
Genus Natalophylus Schuh, 1974
Genus Nubaia Linnavuori, 1975
Genus Orthonotus Stephens, 1829
Genus Parafulvius Carvalho, 1954
Genus Paravoruchia Wagner, 1959
Genus Phylus Hahn, 1831
Genus Plagiognathidea Poppius, 1914
Genus Platyscytisca Costa & Henry, 1999
Genus Platyscytus Reuter, 1907
Genus Porophoroptera Carvalho & Gross, 1982
Genus Psallus Fieber, 1858
Genus Roudairea Puton & Reuter, 1886
Genus Sasajiophylus Yasunaga, 2001
Genus Somalocoris Linnavuori, 1975
Genus Sthenarus Fieber, 1858
Genus Stibaromma Odhiambo, 1961
Genus Tibiopilus Carvalho & Costa, 1993
Genus Trevessa China, 1924
Genus Villaverdea Carvalho, 1990
Genus Widdringtoniola Schuh, 1974
Genus Zakanocoris V. Putshkov, 1970
Genus Zanchiophylus Duwal, Yasunaga, & Lee, 2010

Tribe Pilophorini Douglas & Scott, 1876

Genus Alepidiella Poppius, 1914
Genus Aloea Linnavuori, 1975
Genus Dilatops Weirauch, 2006
Genus Druthmarus Distant, 1909
Genus Ethatractus Linnavuori, 1975
Genus Hypseloecus Reuter, 1891
Genus Lasiolabops Poppius, 1914
Genus Neoambonea Schuh, 1974
Genus Parambonea Schuh, 1974
Genus Parasthenaridea Miller, 1937
Genus Pherolepis Kulik, 1968
Genus Pilophorus Hahn, 1826
Genus Pseudambonea Schuh, 1974
Genus Randallophorus Henry, 2013
Genus Spinolosus Zou, 1985
Genus Sthenaridea Reuter, 1885

Tribe Semiini Knight, 1923

Subtribe Exocarpocorina Schuh & Menard, 2013

Genus Ampimpacoris Weirauch & Schuh, 2011
Genus Ancoraphylus Weirauch, 2007
Genus Araucanophylus Carvalho, 1984
Genus Basileobius Eyles & Schuh, 2003
Genus Chiloephylus Carvalho, 1984
Genus Cyrtodiridius Eyles & Schuh, 2003
Genus Exocarpocoris Weirauch, 2007
Genus Gonzalezinus Carvalho, 1981
Genus Halormus Eyles & Schuh, 2003
Genus Harpagophylus Schuh & Weirauch, 2010
Genus Jiwarli Soto & Weirauch, 2007
Genus Leptidolon Reuter, 1904
Genus Mecenopa Eyles & Schuh, 2003
Genus Melaleucoides Schuh & Weirauch, 2010
Genus Pimeleocoris Eyles & Schuh, 2003
Genus Polyozus Eyles & Schuh, 2003
Genus Thryptomenomiris Schuh & Weirauch, 2010
Genus Wallabicoris Schuh & Pedraza, 2010
Genus Xiphoidellus Weirauch & Schuh, 2011
Genus Xiphoides Eyles & Schuh, 2003

Subtribe Semiina Knight, 1923

Genus Criocoris Fieber, 1858
Genus Hoplomachidea Reuter, 1909
Genus Karoocapsus Schuh, 1974
Genus Monocris V. Putshkov, 1974
Genus Monospatha Eyles & Schuh 2003
Genus Myrmicopsella Poppius, 1914
Genus Nicholia Knight, 1929
Genus Parapseudosthenarus Schuh, 1974
Genus Pseudosthenarus Poppius, 1914
Genus Rakula Odhiambo, 1967
Genus Semium Reuter, 1876
Genus Thoth Linnavuori, 1993
Genus Tytthus Fieber, 1864
