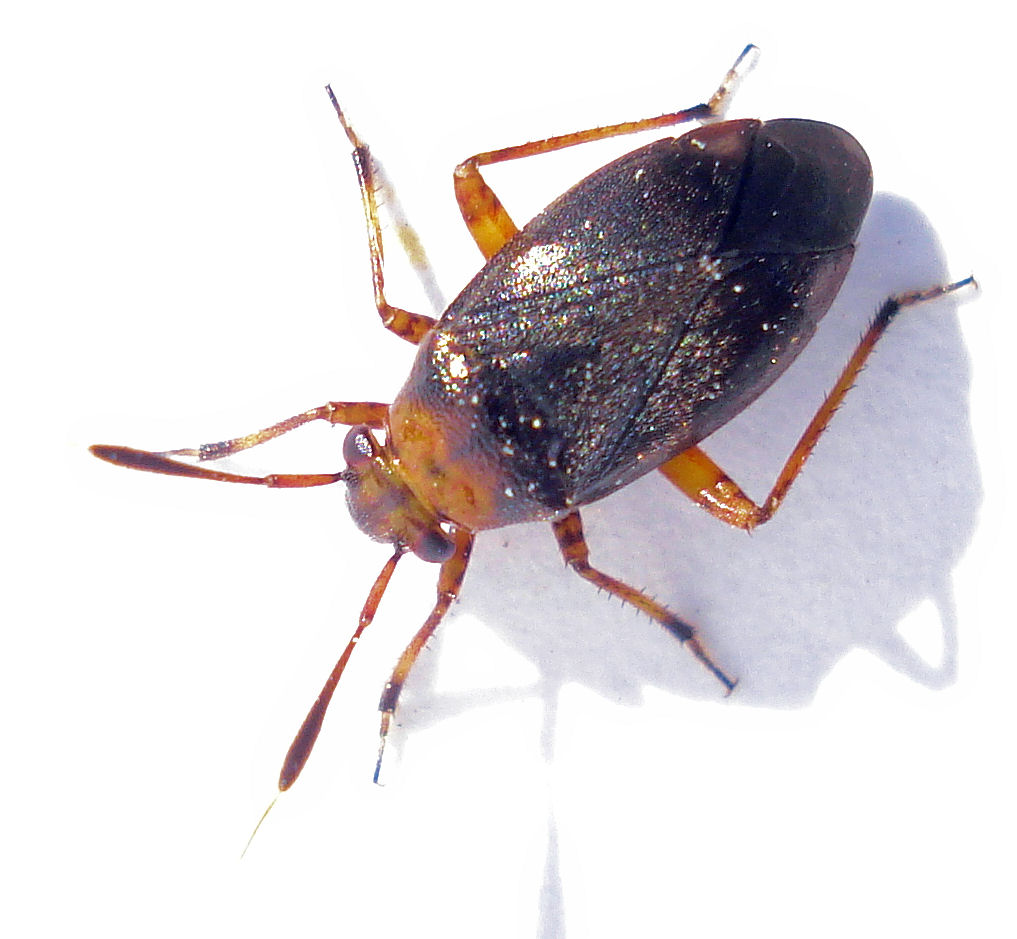
- Capsus ater

Scientific classification
- Kingdom: Animalia
- Phylum: Arthropoda
- Class: Insecta
- Order: Hemiptera
- Suborder: Heteroptera
- Family: Miridae
- Subfamily: Mirinae
- Tribe: Mirini
- Genus: Capsus; Fabricius, 1803

= Capsus =

Genus of true bugs

Capsus is a genus of mirid bugs belonging to the family Miridae, subfamily Mirinae.

== Species ==
Current and extinct species: (Dagger, †, indicates extinct.)

- Capsus annulicornis Herrich-Schaeffer, 1835
- Capsus ater (Linnaeus, 1758)
- Capsus aurulentus (Schilling, 1837)
- Capsus capitatus Herrich-Schaeffer, 1835
- Capsus ceratophyllon Costa, O., 1834
- Capsus cinctus (Kolenati, 1845)
- Capsus coxalis Mulsant and Rey, 1852
- Capsus darsius Distant, 1904
- Capsus gibbicollis Herrich-Schaeffer, 1835
- Capsus intaminatus Walker, 1873
- †Capsus lacus S. Scudder, 1890
- Capsus marginicollis Walker, 1873
- †Capsus obsolefactus S. Scudder, 1890
- Capsus pallescens Herrich-Schaeffer, 1835
- Capsus palustris Kulik, 1977
- Capsus pegasus Distant, 1904
- Capsus peregrinus Herrich-Schaeffer, 1835
- Capsus pilifer Remane, 1950
- Capsus punctipes Mulsant and Rey, 1852
- Capsus semiclusus Walker, 1873
- Capsus subirroratus Walker, 1873
- Capsus tristis Scholtz, 1847
- Capsus wagneri Remane, 1950
- Capsus waltlii Herrich-Schaeffer, 1835

=== Species formerly classified as Caspus ===
- Capsus affinis reclassified as Calocoris affinis (Herrich-Schaeffer, 1835)
- Capsus ambulans reclassified as Mecomma ambulans (Fallén, 1807)
- Capsus antennatus reclassified as Teratocoris antennatus (Boheman, 1852)
- Capsus bicolor reclassified as Platytylus bicolor (Lepeletier and Serville, 1825)
- Capsus brevicollis Meyer-Dur, 1843 junior synonym of Adelphocoris lineolatus (Goeze, 1778)
- Capsus caligineus reclassified as Cyrtocapsus caligineus (Stål, 1859)
- Capsus caricis reclassified as Cyrtorhinus caricis (Fallén, 1807)
- Capsus coccineus reclassified as Pseudoloxops coccineus (Meyer-Dür, 1843)
- Capsus cyrtopeltis reclassified as Stethoconus cyrtopeltis (Flor, 1860)
- Capsus darwini reclassified as Dagbertus darwini (Butler, 1877)
- Capsus elegantulus Meyer-Dür, 1843 junior synonym of Cyrtorhinus caricis (Fallén, 1807)
- Capsus exsanguis reclassified as Megalocoleus exsanguis (Herrich-Schaeffer, 1835)
- Capsus flavipes reclassified as Plagiognathus flavipes (Provancher, 1872)
- Capsus geminus Flor, 1860 synonym for Tytthus pubescens (Knight, 1931)
- Capsus lineolatus reclassified as Adelphocoris lineolatus (Goeze, 1778)
- Capsus maerkelii reclassified as Pithanus maerkelii (Herrich-Schäffer, 1838)
- Capsus magnicornis reclassified as Atractotomus magnicornis (Fallén, 1807)
- Capsus media reclassified as Lopidea media (Say, 1832)
- Capsus mimus reclassified as Dysdercus mimus (Say, 1932)
- Capsus modestus reclassified as Phoenicocoris modestus (Meyer-Dür, 1843)
- Capsus nubilus Herrich-Schaeffer, 1836 synonym for Macrolophus pygmaeus (Rambur, 1839)
- Capsus nubilus Say, 1832 reclassified as Neurocolpus nubilus (Say, 1832)
- Capsus pallidus reclassified as Dicyphus pallidus (Herrich-Schaeffer, 1836)
- Capsus roseus reclassified as Conostethus roseus (Fallén, 1829)
- Capsus rotermundi reclassified as Sthenarus rotermundi (Scholtz, 1847)
- Capsus rutilus Stichel, 1930 junior synonym for Capsus ater (Linnaeus, 1758)
- Capsus solani reclassified as Irbisia solani (Heidemann, 1910)
- Capsus stygicus reclassified as Slaterocoris stygicus (Say, 1832)
- Capsus tenuicornis reclassified as Cylapus tenuicornis (Say, 1832)
- Capsus tumidicornis reclassified as Heterocordylus tumidicornis (Herrich-Schaeffer, 1835)
- Capsus tyrannus (Fabricius, 1781) junior synonym for Capsus ater (Linnaeus, 1758)
- Capsus vitellinus reclassified as Parapsallus vitellinus (Scholtz, 1847)
- Capsus vitripennis reclassified as Hyaliodes vitripennis (Say, 1832)
