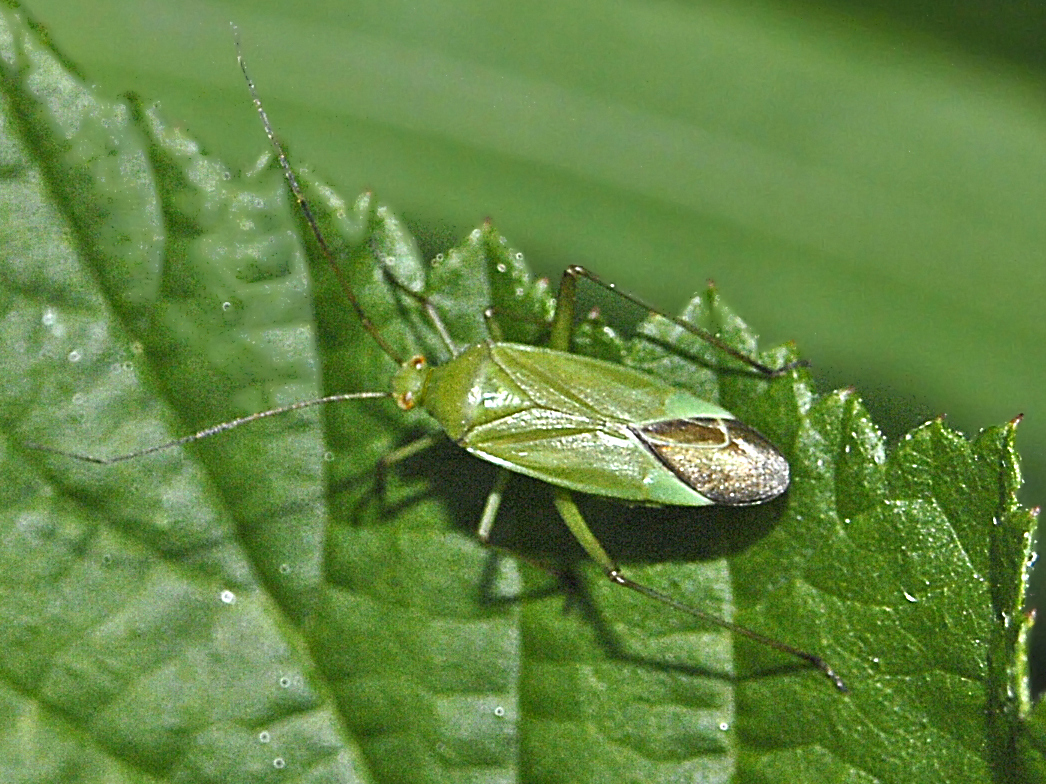
- Adult of Calocoris alpestris

Scientific classification
- Kingdom: Animalia
- Phylum: Arthropoda
- Class: Insecta
- Order: Hemiptera
- Suborder: Heteroptera
- Family: Miridae
- Genus: Calocoris
- Species: C. alpestris

Binomial name
- Calocoris alpestris (Rudolf Meyer-Dür, 1843)

= Calocoris alpestris =

Species of true bug

Calocoris alpestris is a species of bug in the subfamily Mirinae of the family Miridae.

== Distribution and habitat ==
This species is distributed in most of Europe. It is normally found in meadows, damp woodlands and in deciduous forests, preferably in the mountains (up to 2000 m). .

== Description ==
Calocoris alpestris can reach a length of 9–11 millimetres (0.35–0.43 in). These large size plant bugs are entirely green, with a very elongate shape. The 1st antennal segment is very long. The base of the scutellum and thin collar behind the head may be dark.

This species is very similar to Calocoris affinis, but it shows a gray-whitish membrane, with darker veining and the 1st antennal segment is usually dark in the basal part.

== Biology ==
Adults can be found from May to August. These bugs are polyphagous, feeding in many different plant species, mainly on Urtica dioica (juices) and Heracleum sphondylium (nectar).
