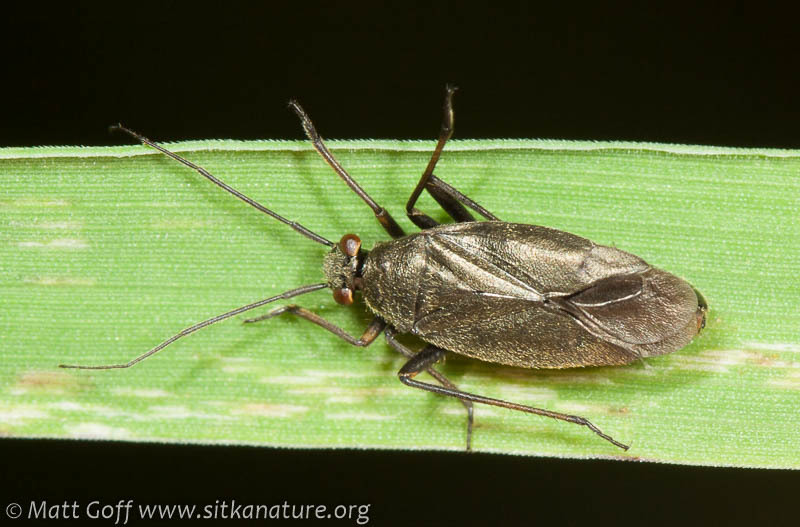

Scientific classification
- Kingdom: Animalia
- Phylum: Arthropoda
- Class: Insecta
- Order: Hemiptera
- Suborder: Heteroptera
- Family: Miridae
- Tribe: Mirini
- Genus: Irbisia
- Species: I. sericans

Binomial name
- Irbisia sericans (Stal, 1858)

Synonyms
- Leptomerocoris sericans Stål, 1858

= Irbisia sericans =

Species of true bug

Irbisia sericans is a species of plant bug in the family Miridae. It is found in Europe and Northern Asia (excluding China) and North America.
