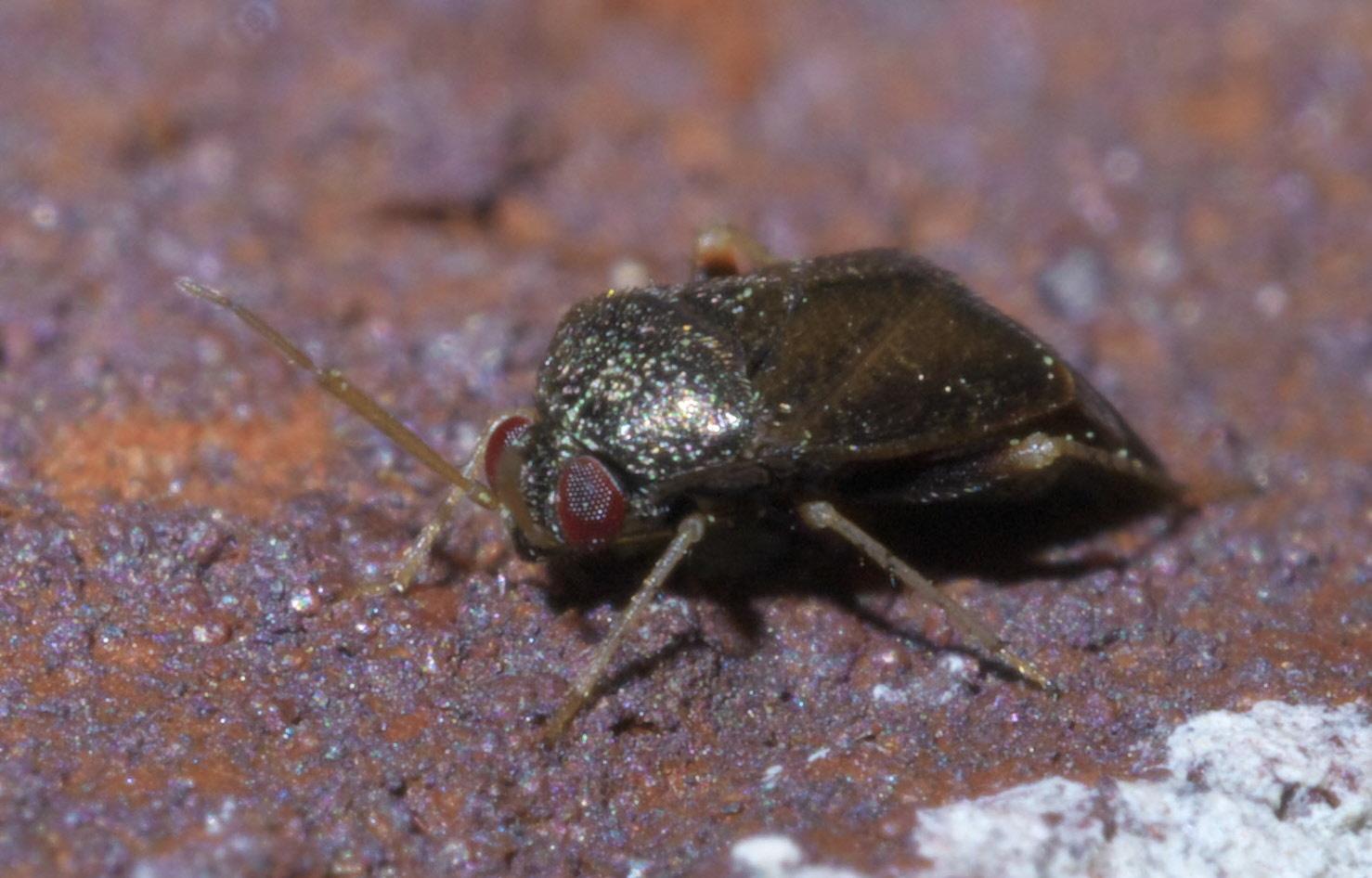
- Phoenicocoris claricornis, Oklahoma

Scientific classification
- Kingdom: Animalia
- Phylum: Arthropoda
- Class: Insecta
- Order: Hemiptera
- Suborder: Heteroptera
- Family: Miridae
- Tribe: Phylini
- Genus: Phoenicocoris
- Species: P. claricornis

Binomial name
- Phoenicocoris claricornis (Knight, 1923)

Synonyms
- Lepidopsallus claricornis Knight, 1923

= Phoenicocoris claricornis =

Species of true bug

Phoenicocoris claricornis is a species of plant bug in the family Miridae. It is found in North America.
