= Neurocolpus jessiae =

Scientific classification
- Kingdom: Animalia
- Phylum: Arthropoda
- Class: Insecta
- Order: Hemiptera
- Suborder: Heteroptera
- Family: Miridae
- Tribe: Mirini
- Genus: Neurocolpus
- Species: N. jessiae

Binomial name
- Neurocolpus jessiae Knight, 1934

Species of true bug

Neurocolpus jessiae is a species of plant bug in the family Miridae. It is found in North America. It feeds on the developing fruits of Sambucus canadensis.
