= Calocoris barberi =

Scientific classification
- Kingdom: Animalia
- Phylum: Arthropoda
- Class: Insecta
- Order: Hemiptera
- Suborder: Heteroptera
- Family: Miridae
- Tribe: Mirini
- Genus: Calocoris
- Species: C. barberi

Binomial name
- Calocoris barberi Henry & Wheeler, 1988

Species of true bug

Calocoris barberi is a species of plant bug in the family Miridae. It is found in North America.
