= Parapsallus =

Scientific classification
- Domain: Eukaryota
- Kingdom: Animalia
- Phylum: Arthropoda
- Class: Insecta
- Order: Hemiptera
- Suborder: Heteroptera
- Family: Miridae
- Genus: Parapsallus; Wagner, 1952

Genus of true bugs

Parapsallus is a genus of true bugs belonging to the family Miridae.

Species:

- Parapsallus vitellinus (Scholtz, 1874)
