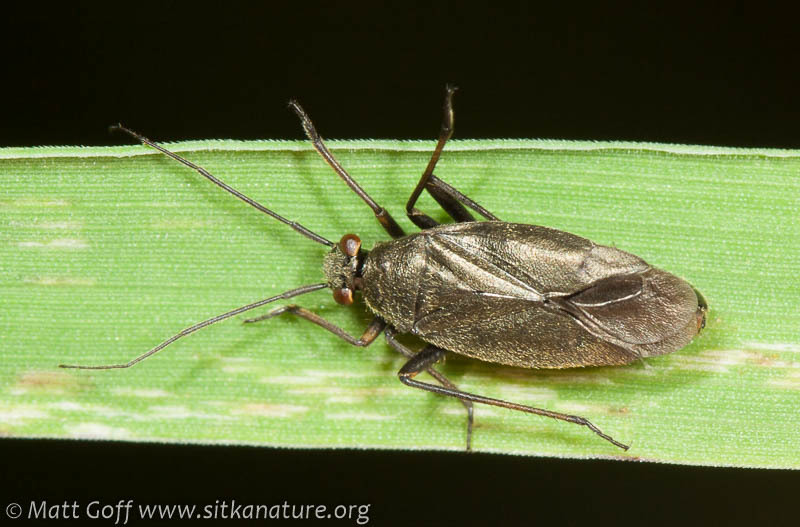
- Irbisia sericans on a blade of grass

Scientific classification
- Kingdom: Animalia
- Phylum: Arthropoda
- Clade: Pancrustacea
- Class: Insecta
- Order: Hemiptera
- Suborder: Heteroptera
- Family: Miridae
- Subfamily: Mirinae
- Tribe: Mirini
- Genus: Irbisia; Reuter, 1875

Synonyms
- Thyrillus Uhler, 1894

= Irbisia =

Genus of true bugs

Irbisia is a genus of plant bugs in the family Miridae. There are more than 20 described species in Irbisia. These black insects are 5–8 mm in length. They are also called black grass bugs as they are common in spring grasses.

== Species ==
These 25 species belong to the genus Irbisia:

- Irbisia bliveni Schwartz, 1984
- Irbisia brachycera (Uhler, 1872)
- Irbisia californica Van Duzee, 1921
- Irbisia cascadia Schwartz, 1984
- Irbisia castanipes Van Duzee, 1921
- Irbisia cuneomaculata Blatchley, 1934
- Irbisia elongata Knight, 1941
- Irbisia fuscipubescens Knight, 1941
- Irbisia incomperta Bliven, 1963
- Irbisia knighti Schwartz & Lattin, 1984
- Irbisia limata Bliven, 1963
- Irbisia mollipes Van Duzee, 1917
- Irbisia morio (Reuter, 1909)
- Irbisia nigripes Knight, 1925
- Irbisia oreas Bliven, 1963
- Irbisia pacifica (Uhler, 1872) (Pacific grass bug)
- Irbisia panda Bliven, 1963
- Irbisia sericans (Stal, 1858)
- Irbisia serrata Bliven, 1963
- Irbisia setosa Van Duzee, 1921
- Irbisia shulli Knight, 1941
- Irbisia silvosa Bliven, 1961
- Irbisia sita Van Duzee, 1921
- Irbisia solana Heidemann
- Irbisia solani (Heidemann, 1910)
