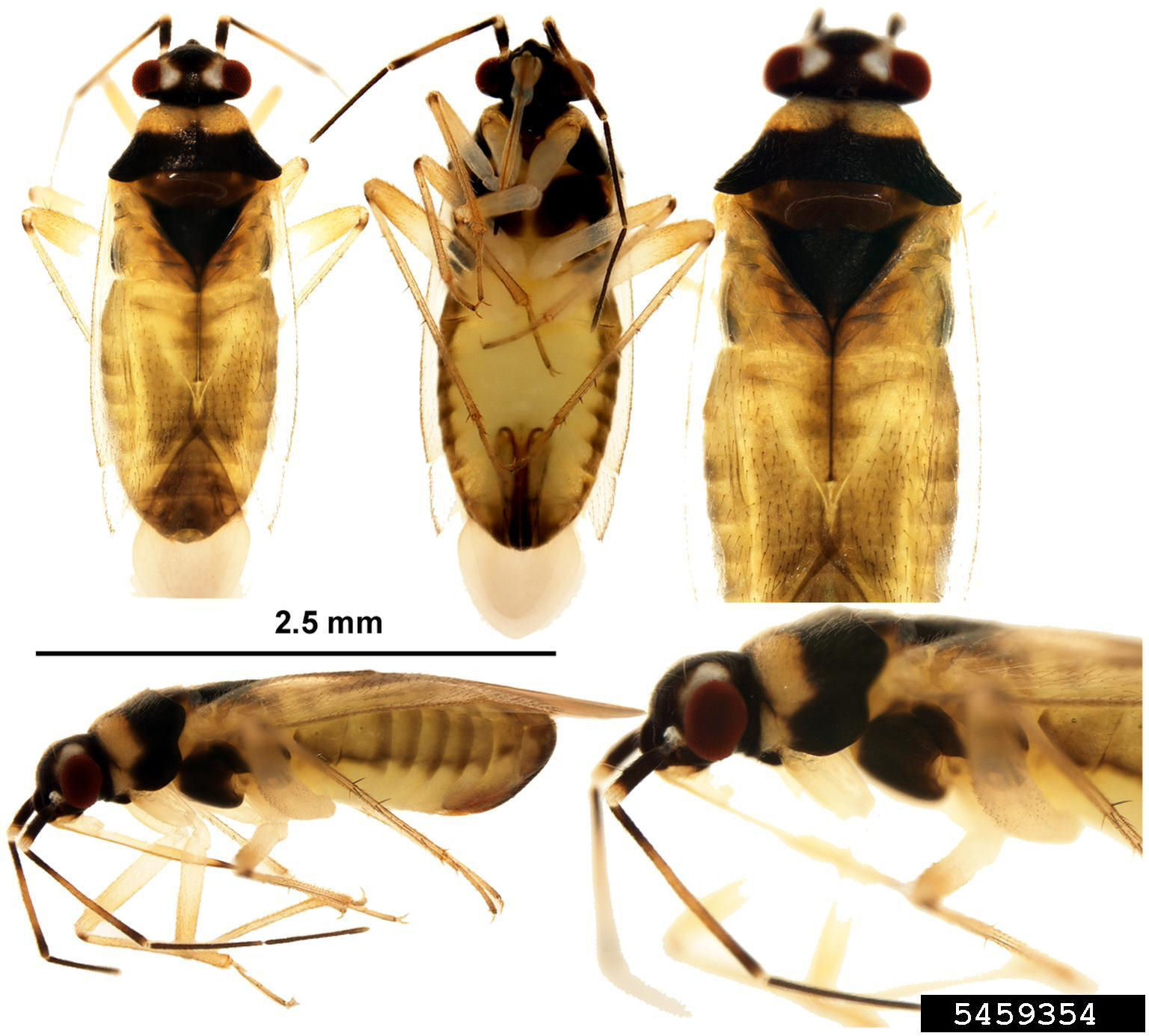
- Tytthus parviceps

Scientific classification
- Kingdom: Animalia
- Phylum: Arthropoda
- Class: Insecta
- Order: Hemiptera
- Suborder: Heteroptera
- Family: Miridae
- Subfamily: Phylinae
- Tribe: Semiini
- Genus: Tytthus; Fieber, 1864

Type species
- Tytthus pubescens (Knight, 1931)

Species
- See text

Synonyms
- Breddiniessa Kirkaldy, 1903; Cylloceps Uhler, 1893; Isoproba Osborn and Drake, 1915; Periscopus Breddin, 1896

= Tytthus =

Genus of true bugs

Tytthus is a genus of insects in family Miridae, the plant bugs. They are carnivorous, feeding upon the eggs of various planthoppers in the family Delphacidae, and thus are important in the biological control of pests. The genus is distributed throughout the Holarctic of the Northern Hemisphere, but species are also found in the tropics, in China, South America, Australia, and the Indo-Pacific.

== Type species ==
In 1860 Gustav Flor described a bug he found in Estonia and named it Capsus geminus. When Fieber established the genus Tytthus in 1864, he named two species to the genus, Zetterstedt's Capus pygmaeus and Flor's Capus geminus. Capus geminus thus became Tytthus geminus, by which name it was known as for well over a hundred years. In 1906 Kirkaldy named then Tytthus geminus as the type species for the genus. But, as Henry and Wheeler discovered in 1988, the name Capsus geminus was not available in 1860, because Thomas Say had already used it 1832 for another species entirely. So, after researching the various previous nomenclaturial acts regarding the bug, they discovered that the next available name was one used by Harry H. Knight in 1931 to describe the same bug as if it were a new species, but placing it in the genus Cyrtorhinus Fieber, 1858 as Reuter had made Tytthus a junior synonym of Cyrtorhinus. Knight's name, Cyrtorhinus pubescens was the oldest junior synonym. In 1992, Wheeler and Henry published a treatise reviewing the Miridae family occurring in the Holarctic, and formally corrected the nomenclaturial error in accordance with the International Code of Zoological Nomenclature, with the result that the type species was henceforth called Tytthus pubescens (Knight, 1931).

== Tribe ==
In 1955 Carvalho and Southwood (1955) rescued Tytthus from synonymity with the look-alike genus Cyrtorhinus Fieber, 1858, and showed that Tytthus belonged in the subfamily Phylinae based upon analysis of the pretarsal structures and the male genitalia. And as a result it was placed in the catch-all (nominal) tribe Phylini when Carvalho created it in 1958. Similarities in a number of structures including the U-shaped endosoma (internal holding pouch for the tip of the aedeagus), the fine setae (bristles) of the parempodia, and the relative small size of the male genitalia, led Schuh in 1974 to place Tytthus in the Leucophoropterini along with the genus Karoocapsus.

In 1999, however, Kerzhner and Josifov conservatively placed the Leucophoropterini as a synonym under the Phylini, following Linnavuouri, whose analysis in 1993 led him to believe that it was unnecessary to split the Phylini tribe based on the available evidence. Evidence was soon forthcoming from Menard and Schuh in 2011, where molecular and morphological evidence provided strong support for the monophyly of Leucophoropterini, so long as Tytthus, Karoocapsus and five other genera were grouped outside the tribe. In 2013 the Semiini tribe was resurrected and redefined by Menard, Schuh and Woolley, and Tytthus was placed with the Semiini.

== Species ==
- Tytthus alboornatus (Knight, 1931)
- Tytthus amazonicus Carvalho, 1983
- Tytthus balli (Knight, 1931)
- Tytthus chinensis (Stål 1860)
- Tytthus columbiensis Carvalho, 1984
- Tytthus entrerianus Carvalho and Carpintero, 1986
- Tytthus femoralis Henry, 2012
- Tytthus fuscicornis Henry, 2012
- Tytthus insperatus (Knight, 1925)
- Tytthus juturnaiba Carvalho and Wallerstein, 1978
- Tytthus mexicanus Henry, 2012
- Tytthus montanus Carvalho and Southwood, 1955
- Tytthus mundulus (Breddin, 1896)
- Tytthus neotropicalis (Carvalho, 1954)
- Tytthus pallidus Henry, 2012
- Tytthus panamensis Carvalho and Southwood, 1955
- Tytthus parviceps (Reuter, 1890)
- Tytthus picea (Osborn and Drake, 1915)
- Tytthus pubescens (Knight, 1931)
- Tytthus pygmaeus (Zetterstedt, 1840)
- Tytthus uniformis Henry, 2012
- Tytthus vagus (Knight, 1923)
- Tytthus wheeleri Henry, 2012
- Tytthus zwaluwenburgi (Usinger, 1944)

=== No longer valid ===
- Tytthus annulicollis (Poppius, 1915) junior synonym Tytthus chinensis (Stål 1860)
- Tytthus elongatus (Poppius, 1915) junior synonym Tytthus chinensis (Stål 1860)
- Tytthus flaveolus Reuter, 1871 now Fieberocapsus flaveolus (Reuter, 1871)
- Tytthus flavescens Stichel, 1956 junior synonym Tytthus pygmaeus (Zetterstedt, 1840)
- Tytthus flavomarginatus Stichel, 1956 junior synonym Tytthus pygmaeus (Zetterstedt, 1840)
- Tytthus flori Stichel, 1956 junior synonym Tytthus pubescens (Knight, 1931)
- Tytthus geminus (Flor, 1860) now Tytthus pubescens (Knight, 1931)
- Tytthus hondurensis Carvalho junior synonym Tytthus picea (Osborn and Drake, 1915)
- Tytthus insignis Douglas and Scott, 1866 junior synonym Tytthus pygmaeus (Zetterstedt, 1840)
- Tytthus intermedius Stichel, 1956 junior synonym Tytthus parviceps (Reuter, 1890)
- Tytthus koreanus Josifov and Kerzhner, 1972 junior synonym Tytthus chinensis (Stål 1860)
- Tytthus pallidior Stichel, 1956 junior synonym Tytthus pubescens (Knight, 1931)
- Tytthus pellicia (Uhler, 1893) junior synonym Tytthus parviceps (Reuter, 1890)
- Tytthus pellucens (Boheman, 1852) junior synonym Tytthus pygmaeus (Zetterstedt, 1840)
- Tytthus riveti (Cheesman, 1927) junior synonym Tytthus chinensis (Stål 1860)
- Tytthus thoracicus (Horvath, 1909) junior synonym Tytthus parviceps (Reuter, 1890)

== Description ==
Adults range from the males of Tytthus wheeleri, which are just over a millimeter long, to T. mundulus, which is about 3.60 mm in length. Adults have shiny, broad, globose heads. The eyes have a yellow dot on the inside edge. In general, they have dark brown to black heads, a pronotum and scutellum, a pale translucent hemelytra, slender legs, and slender antennae. Tytthus resembles the genus Cyrtorhinus, and was previously considered to be a junior synonym.

== Ecology ==
The members of Tytthus feed on the eggs of Delphacidae and a few on the eggs of other planthoppers. One of the early success stories of biological pest control was Frederick Muir's importation of Tytthus mundulus from Queensland, Australia to Hawaii to eat the eggs of Perkinsiella saccharicida that fed on the sugar cane crops.
