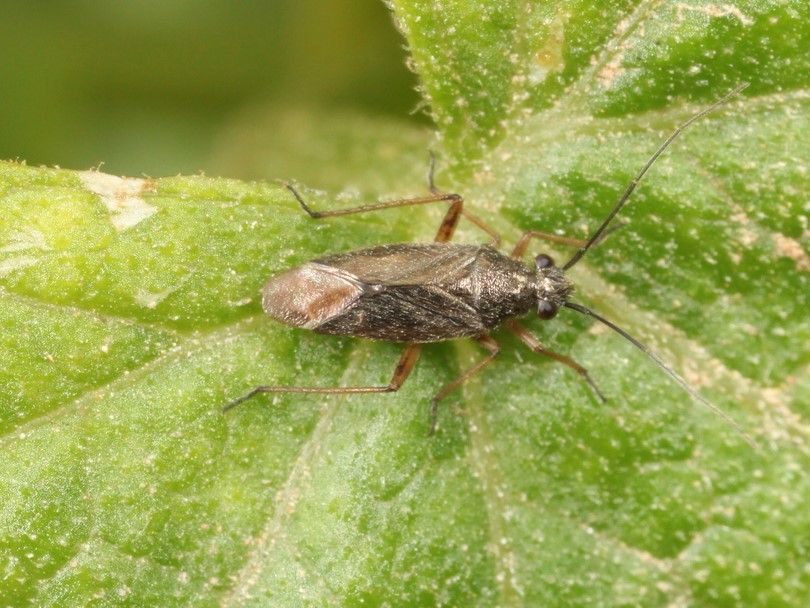

Scientific classification
- Kingdom: Animalia
- Phylum: Arthropoda
- Class: Insecta
- Order: Hemiptera
- Suborder: Heteroptera
- Family: Miridae
- Tribe: Mirini
- Genus: Irbisia
- Species: I. californica

Binomial name
- Irbisia californica Van Duzee, 1921

= Irbisia californica =

Species of true bug

Irbisia californica is a species of plant bug in the family Miridae. It is found in Central America and North America.
