= Irbisia fuscipubescens =

Scientific classification
- Kingdom: Animalia
- Phylum: Arthropoda
- Class: Insecta
- Order: Hemiptera
- Suborder: Heteroptera
- Family: Miridae
- Tribe: Mirini
- Genus: Irbisia
- Species: I. fuscipubescens

Binomial name
- Irbisia fuscipubescens Knight, 1941

Species of true bug

Irbisia fuscipubescens is a species of plant bug in the family Miridae. It is found in North America.
