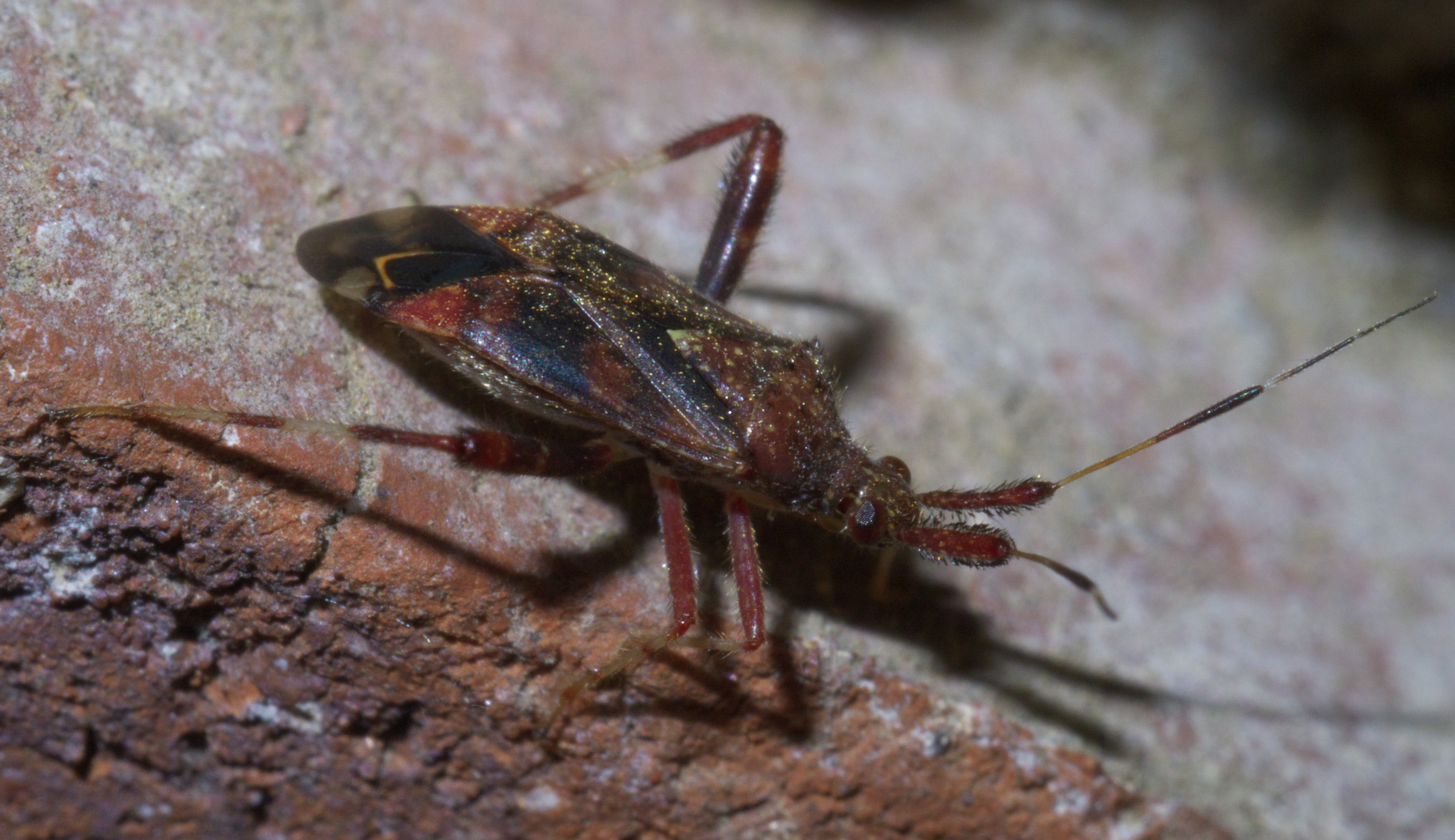

Scientific classification
- Kingdom: Animalia
- Phylum: Arthropoda
- Clade: Pancrustacea
- Class: Insecta
- Order: Hemiptera
- Suborder: Heteroptera
- Family: Miridae
- Subfamily: Mirinae
- Tribe: Mirini
- Genus: Neurocolpus; Reuter, 1876

= Neurocolpus =

Genus of true bugs

Neurocolpus is a genus of plant bugs in the family Miridae. There are about 19 described species in Neurocolpus.

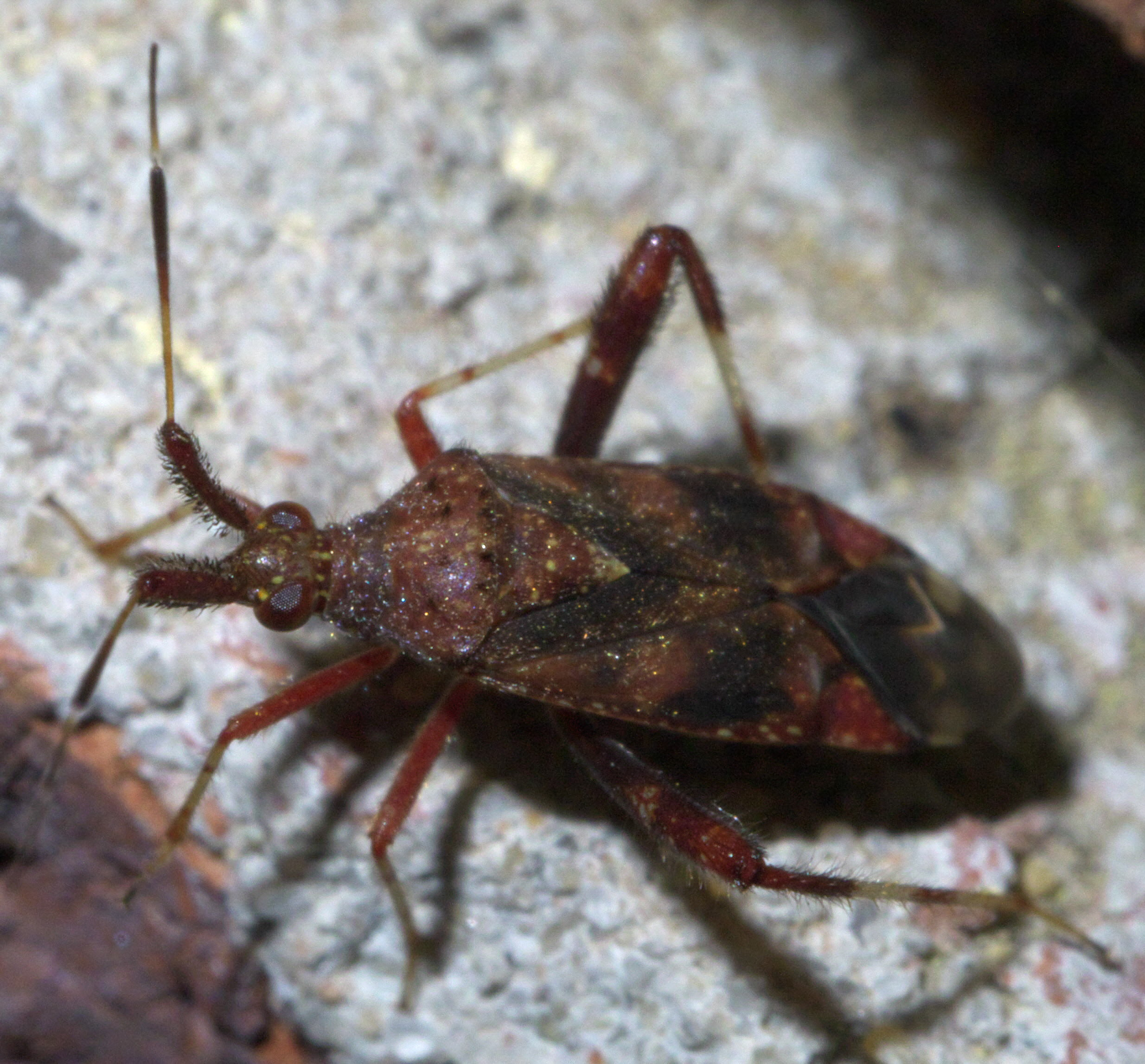

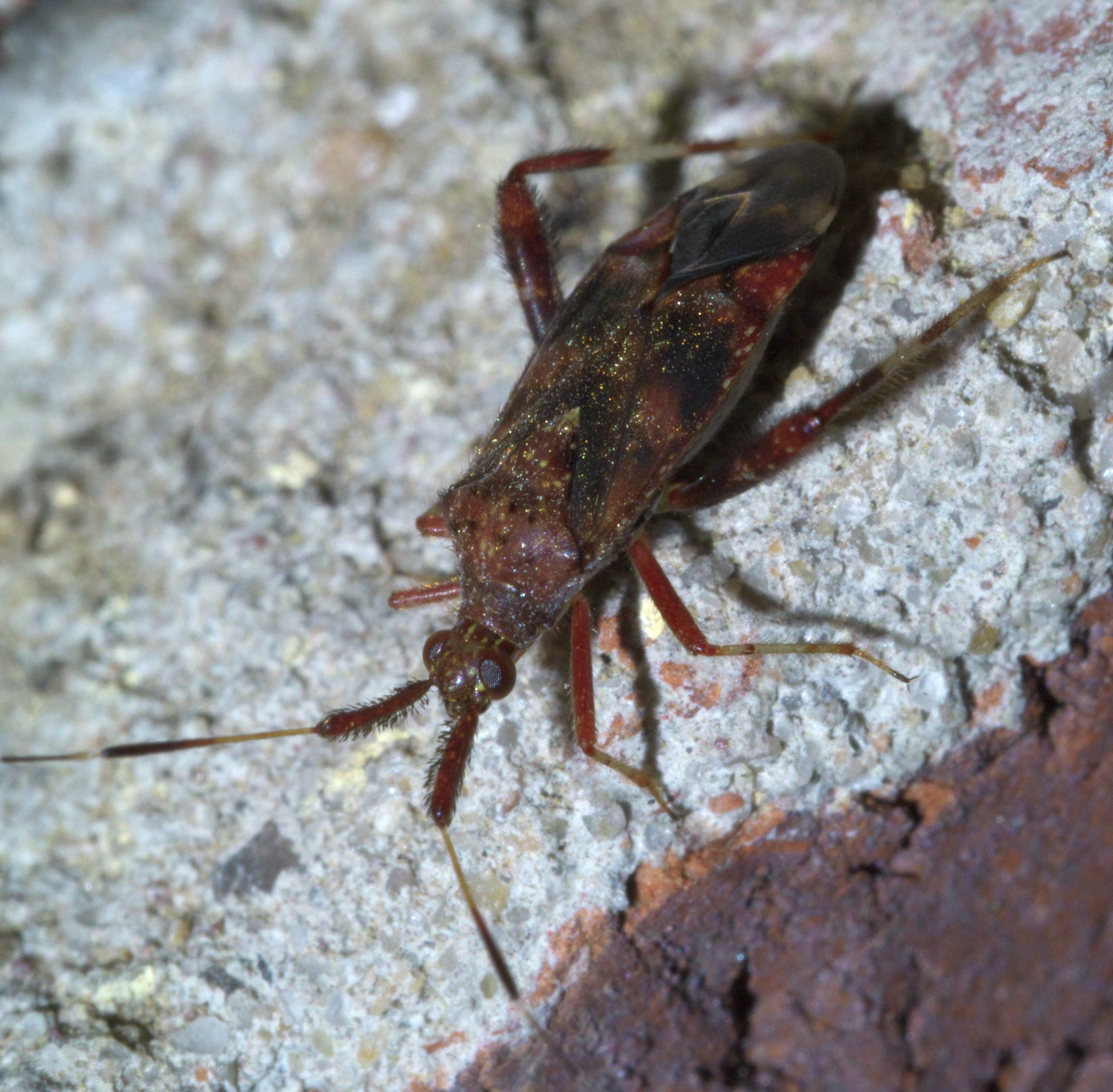

== Species ==
These 19 species belong to the genus Neurocolpus:

- Neurocolpus arizonae Knight, 1934
- Neurocolpus brevicornis Henry, 1984
- Neurocolpus clavatus Henry & Kim, 1984
- Neurocolpus flavescens Blatchley, 1928
- Neurocolpus fuscicornis Henry & Kim, 1984
- Neurocolpus jessiae Knight, 1934
- Neurocolpus johnstoni Knight, 1934
- Neurocolpus knighti Henry, 1984
- Neurocolpus longicornis Henry & Kim, 1984
- Neurocolpus longirostris Knight, 1968
- Neurocolpus mexicanus Distant, 1883
- Neurocolpus montanus Knight, 1968
- Neurocolpus nicholi Knight, 1968
- Neurocolpus nubilus (Say, 1832) (clouded plant bug)
- Neurocolpus ornatus Henry & Kim, 1984
- Neurocolpus pumilus Henry, 1984
- Neurocolpus scutellatus Henry & Kim, 1984
- Neurocolpus simplex Van Duzee, 1918
- Neurocolpus tiliae Knight, 1934
