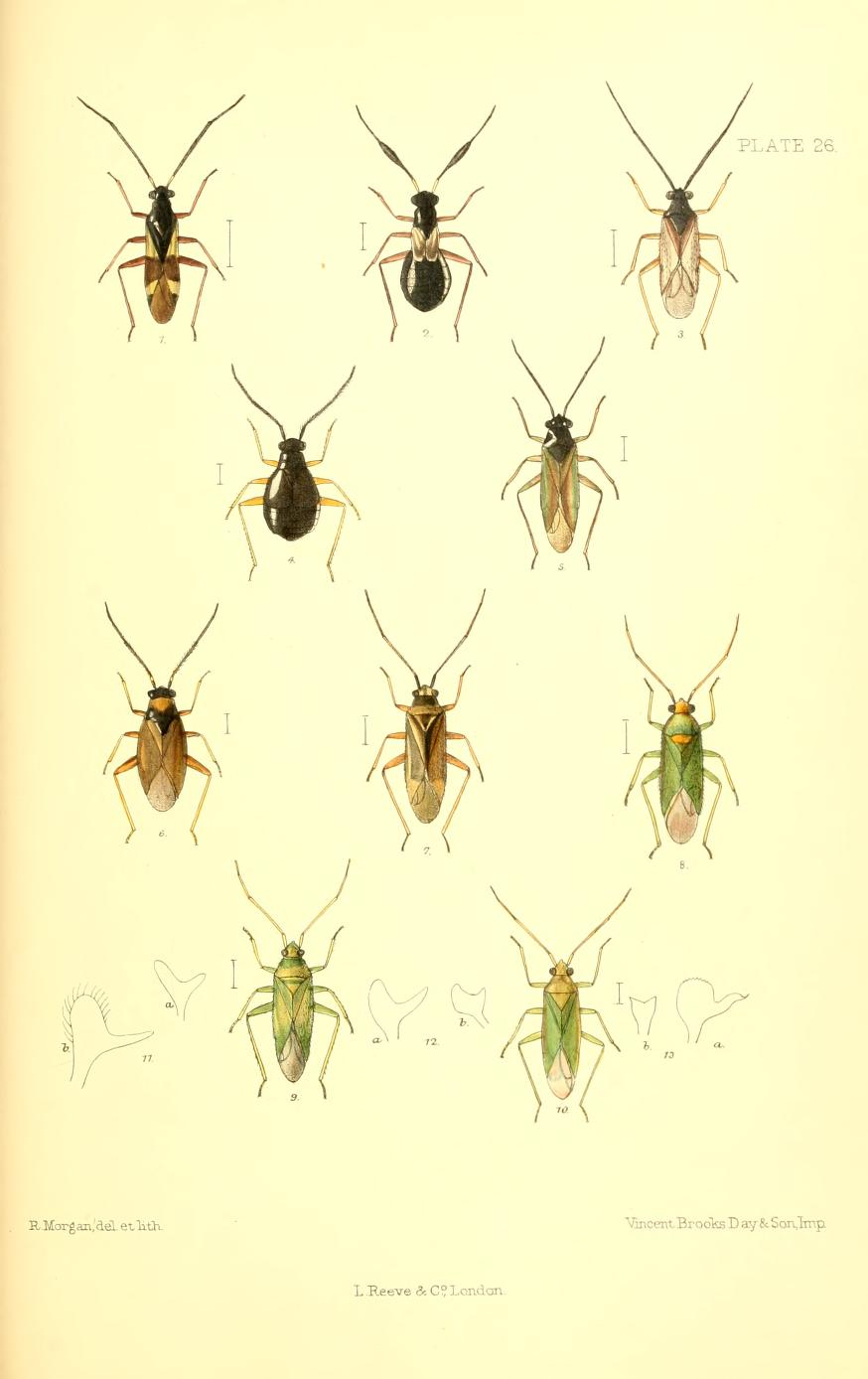
- Mecomma dispar depicted in Edward Saunders figure 2

Scientific classification
- Kingdom: Animalia
- Phylum: Arthropoda
- Clade: Pancrustacea
- Class: Insecta
- Order: Hemiptera
- Suborder: Heteroptera
- Family: Miridae
- Genus: Mecomma
- Species: M. dispar

Binomial name
- Mecomma dispar (Boheman, 1852)

= Mecomma dispar =

Species of true bug

Mecomma dispar is a Palearctic species of true bug.
