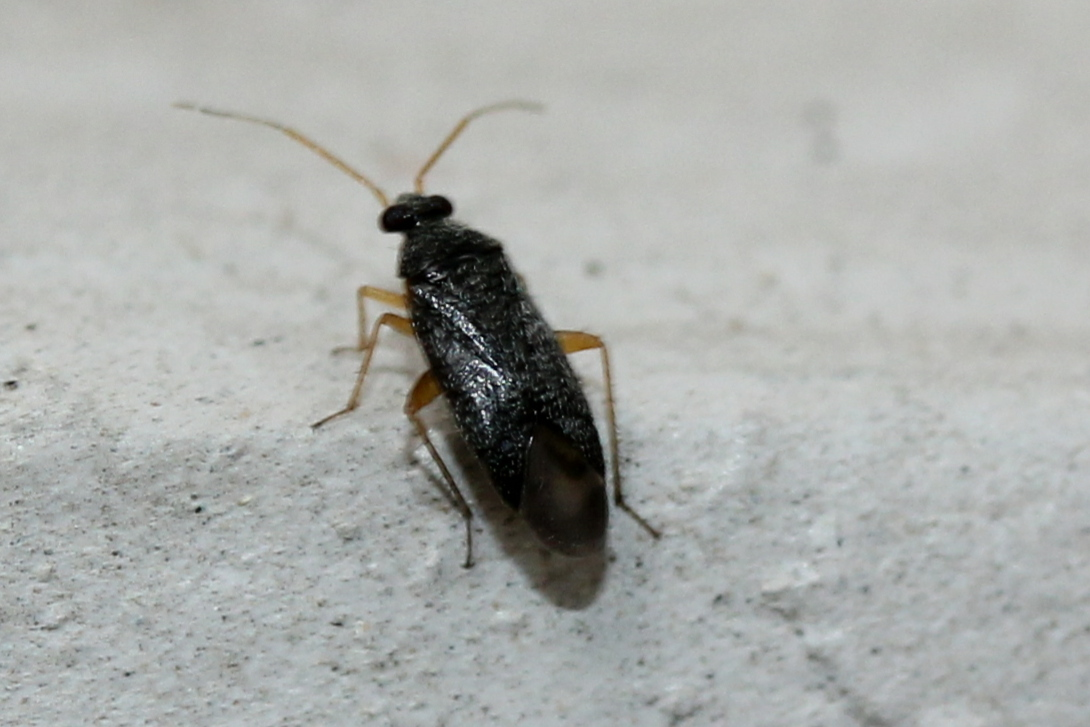

Scientific classification
- Kingdom: Animalia
- Phylum: Arthropoda
- Class: Insecta
- Order: Hemiptera
- Suborder: Heteroptera
- Family: Miridae
- Tribe: Phylini
- Genus: Phoenicocoris
- Species: P. strobicola

Binomial name
- Phoenicocoris strobicola (Knight, 1923)

= Phoenicocoris strobicola =

Species of true bug

Phoenicocoris strobicola is a species of plant bug in the family Miridae. It is found in North America.
