= Tytthus alboornatus =

Scientific classification
- Kingdom: Animalia
- Phylum: Arthropoda
- Class: Insecta
- Order: Hemiptera
- Suborder: Heteroptera
- Family: Miridae
- Tribe: Semiini
- Genus: Tytthus
- Species: T. alboornatus

Binomial name
- Tytthus alboornatus (Knight, 1931)

Species of true bug

Tytthus alboornatus is a species of plant bug in the family Miridae. It is found in North America.
