= Capsus cinctus =

Scientific classification
- Kingdom: Animalia
- Phylum: Arthropoda
- Class: Insecta
- Order: Hemiptera
- Suborder: Heteroptera
- Family: Miridae
- Tribe: Mirini
- Genus: Capsus
- Species: C. cinctus

Binomial name
- Capsus cinctus (Kolenati, 1845)

Species of true bug

Capsus cinctus is a species of plant bug in the family Miridae. It is found in Europe and Northern Asia (excluding China) and North America.
