= Calocoris texanus =

Scientific classification
- Kingdom: Animalia
- Phylum: Arthropoda
- Class: Insecta
- Order: Hemiptera
- Suborder: Heteroptera
- Family: Miridae
- Genus: Calocoris
- Species: C. texanus

Binomial name
- Calocoris texanus Knight, 1942

Species of true bug

Calocoris texanus is a species of true bug in the family Miridae. It lives in the Nearctic and is part of the Calocoris genus.
