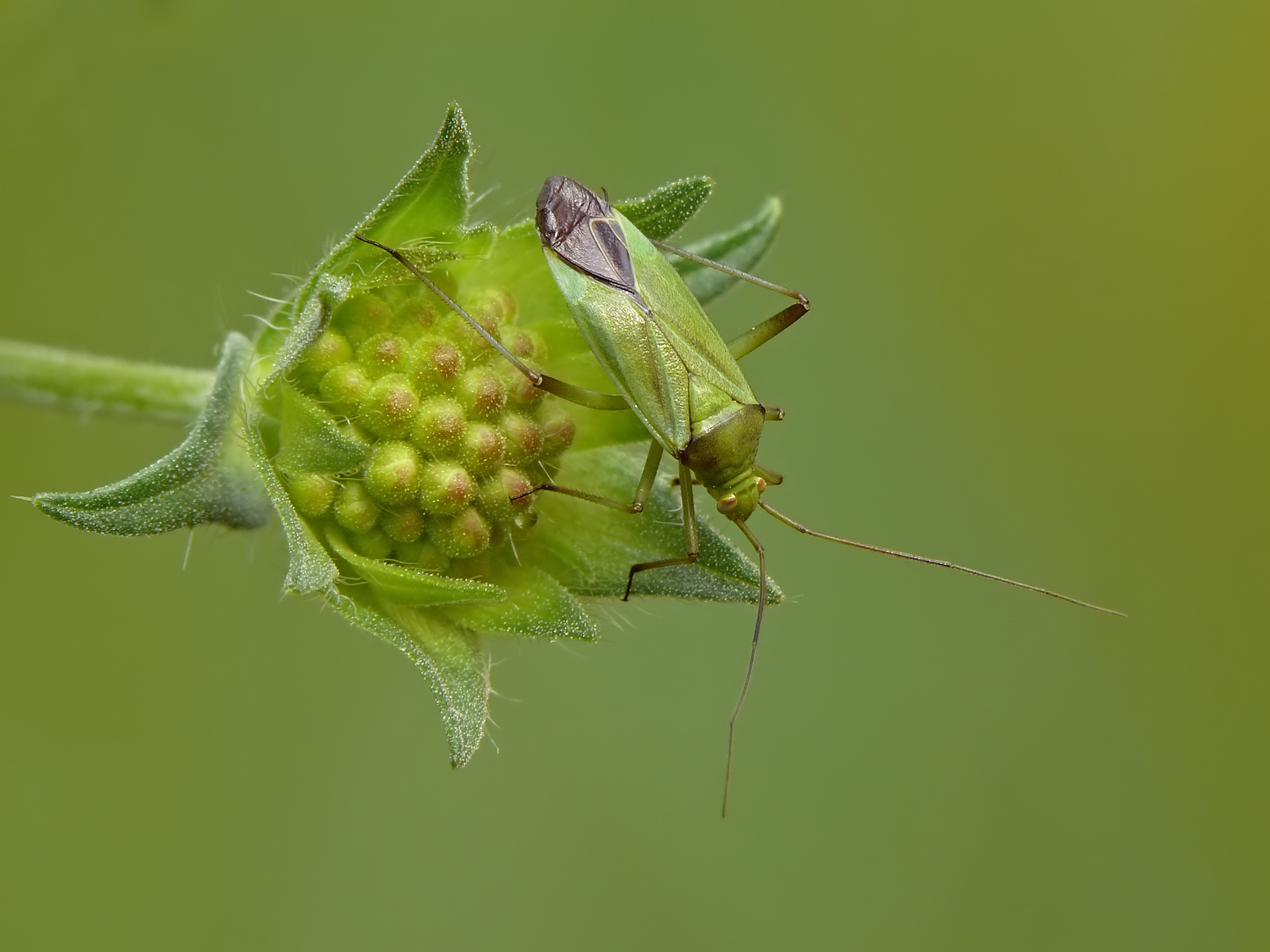
- Calocoris affinis on Knautia arvensis

Scientific classification
- Kingdom: Animalia
- Phylum: Arthropoda
- Class: Insecta
- Order: Hemiptera
- Suborder: Heteroptera
- Family: Miridae
- Subfamily: Mirinae
- Tribe: Mirini
- Genus: Calocoris; Fieber, 1858

= Calocoris =

Genus of true bugs

Calocoris affinis on Apiaceae flower

Calocoris is a genus of true bugs in the Miridae family.

== Species ==
- Calocoris affinis
- Calocoris alpestris
- Calocoris angustatus
- Calocoris aragonus
- Calocoris barberi
- Calocoris braunsi
- Calocoris dohertyi
- Calocoris fasciativentris
- Calocoris forsythi
- Calocoris fulvomaculatus
- Calocoris javanus
- Calocoris montaguei
- Calocoris nemoralis
- Calocoris nigristigmaticus
- Calocoris porphyropterus
- Calocoris rama
- Calocoris roseomaculatus
- Calocoris rubicundus
- Calocoris rubroannulatus
- Calocoris smaragdinus
- Calocoris stoliczkanus
- Calocoris texanus
