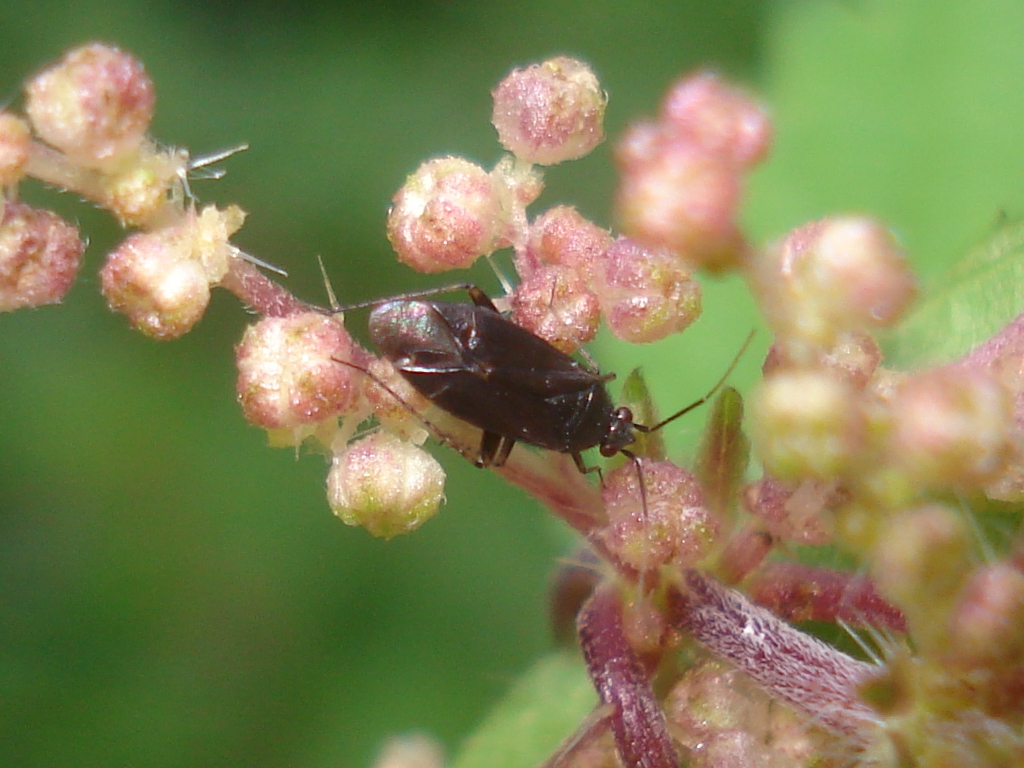
- Phoenicocoris obscurellus

Scientific classification
- Kingdom: Animalia
- Phylum: Arthropoda
- Clade: Pancrustacea
- Class: Insecta
- Order: Hemiptera
- Suborder: Heteroptera
- Family: Miridae
- Subfamily: Phylinae
- Tribe: Phylini
- Genus: Phoenicocoris; Reuter, 1875

= Phoenicocoris =

Genus of true bugs

Phoenicocoris is a genus of plant bugs in the family Miridae. There are about 16 described species in Phoenicocoris.

== Species ==
These 16 species belong to the genus Phoenicocoris:

- Phoenicocoris australis (Blatchley, 1926)
- Phoenicocoris claricornis (Knight, 1923)
- Phoenicocoris crataegi (Knight, 1931)
- Phoenicocoris dissimilis (Reuter, 1878)
- Phoenicocoris hesperus (Knight, 1968)
- Phoenicocoris longirostris (Knight, 1968)
- Phoenicocoris minusculus (Knight, 1923)
- Phoenicocoris modestus (Meyer-Dür, 1843)
- Phoenicocoris nevadensis Schwartz & Stonedahl, 2004
- Phoenicocoris obscurellus (Fallén, 1829)
- Phoenicocoris opacus (Reuter, 1906)
- Phoenicocoris pallidicornis Schwartz & Stonedahl, 2004
- Phoenicocoris ponderosae Schwartz & Stonedahl, 2004
- Phoenicocoris rostratus (Knight, 1923)
- Phoenicocoris strobicola (Knight, 1923)
- Phoenicocoris vidali (Lindberg, 1940)
