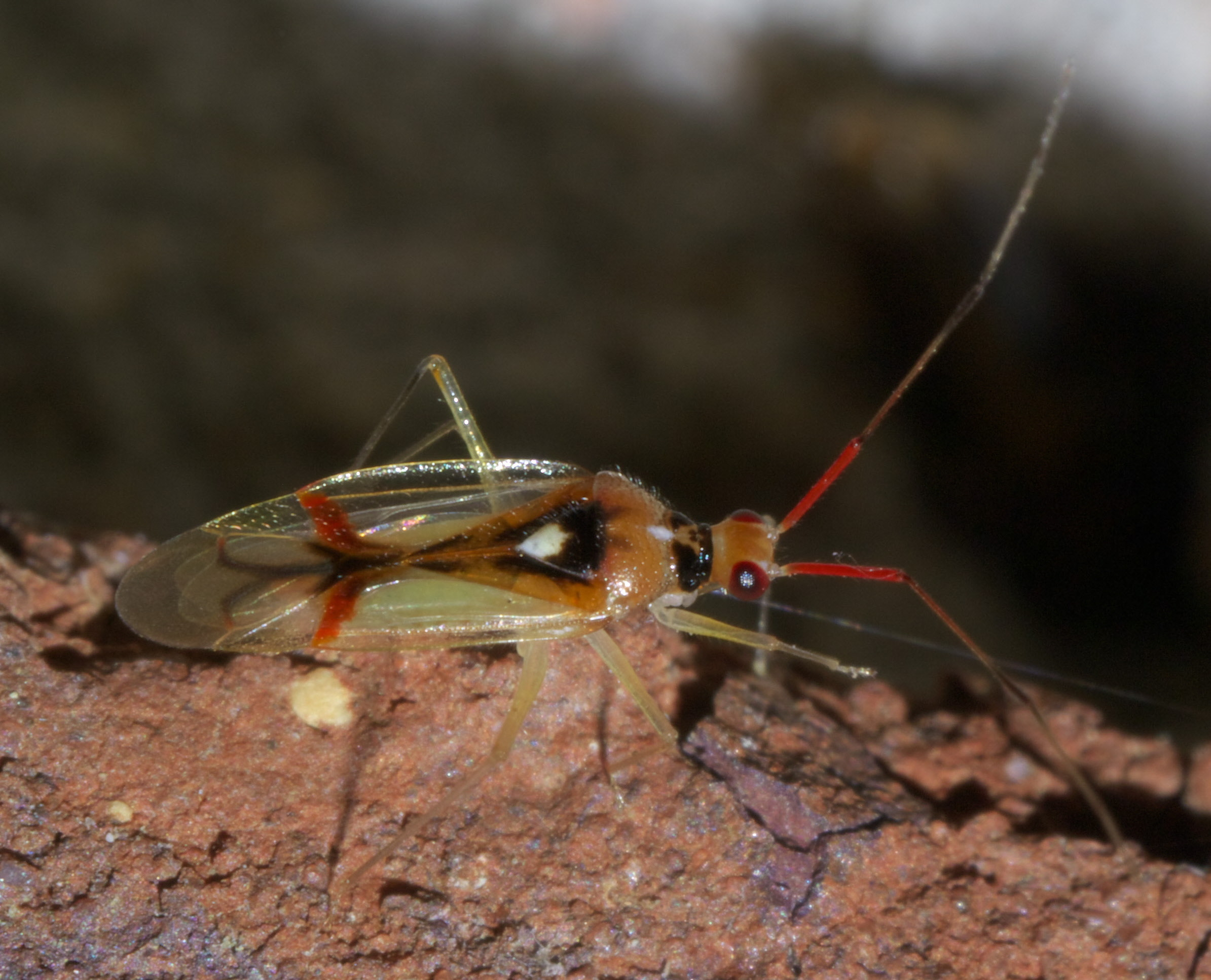

Scientific classification
- Domain: Eukaryota
- Kingdom: Animalia
- Phylum: Arthropoda
- Class: Insecta
- Order: Hemiptera
- Suborder: Heteroptera
- Family: Miridae
- Genus: Hyaliodes
- Species: H. harti

Binomial name
- Hyaliodes harti Knight, 1941

= Hyaliodes harti =

Species of true bug

Hyaliodes harti is a species of plant bug in the family Miridae. It is found in North America.

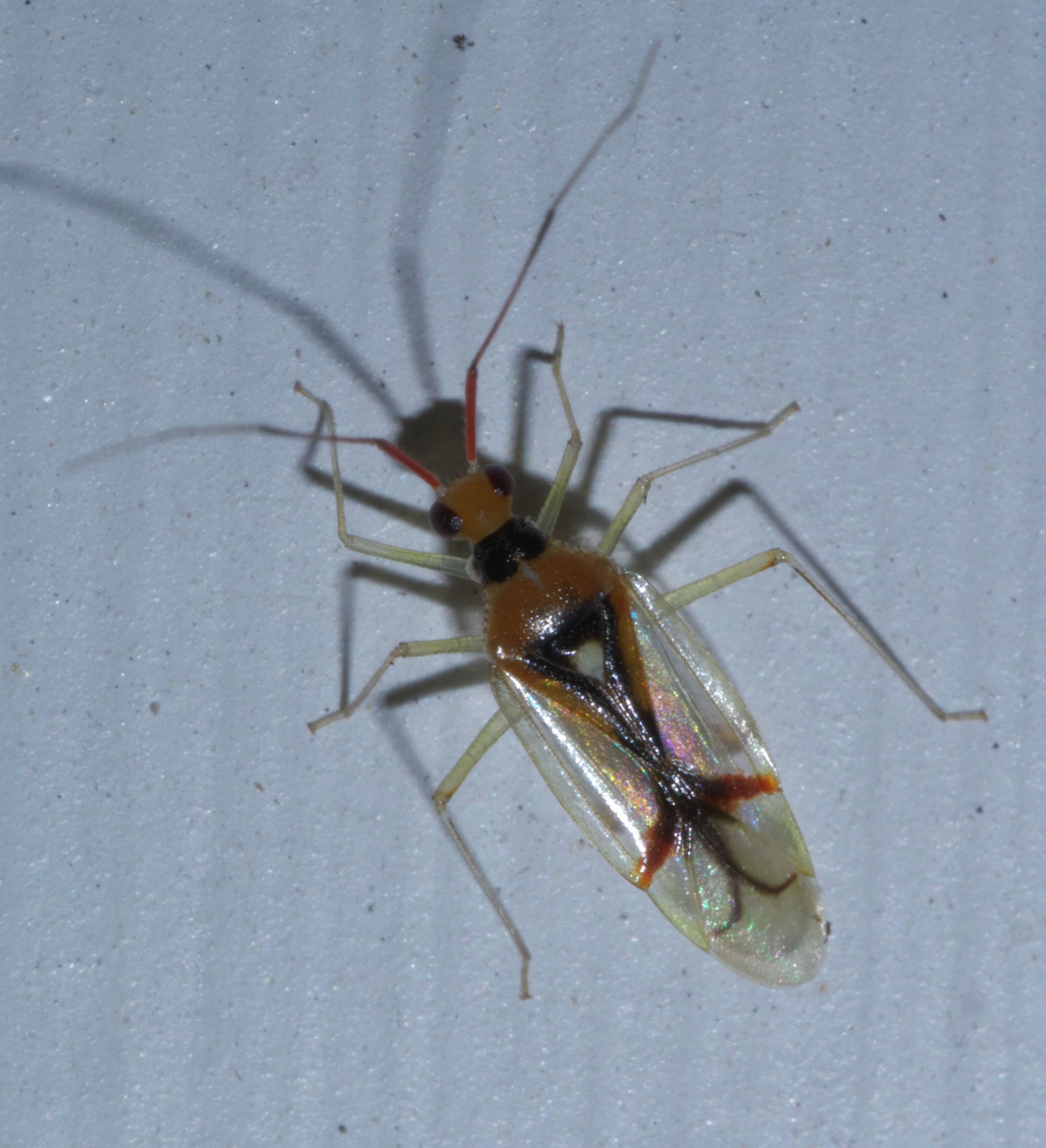

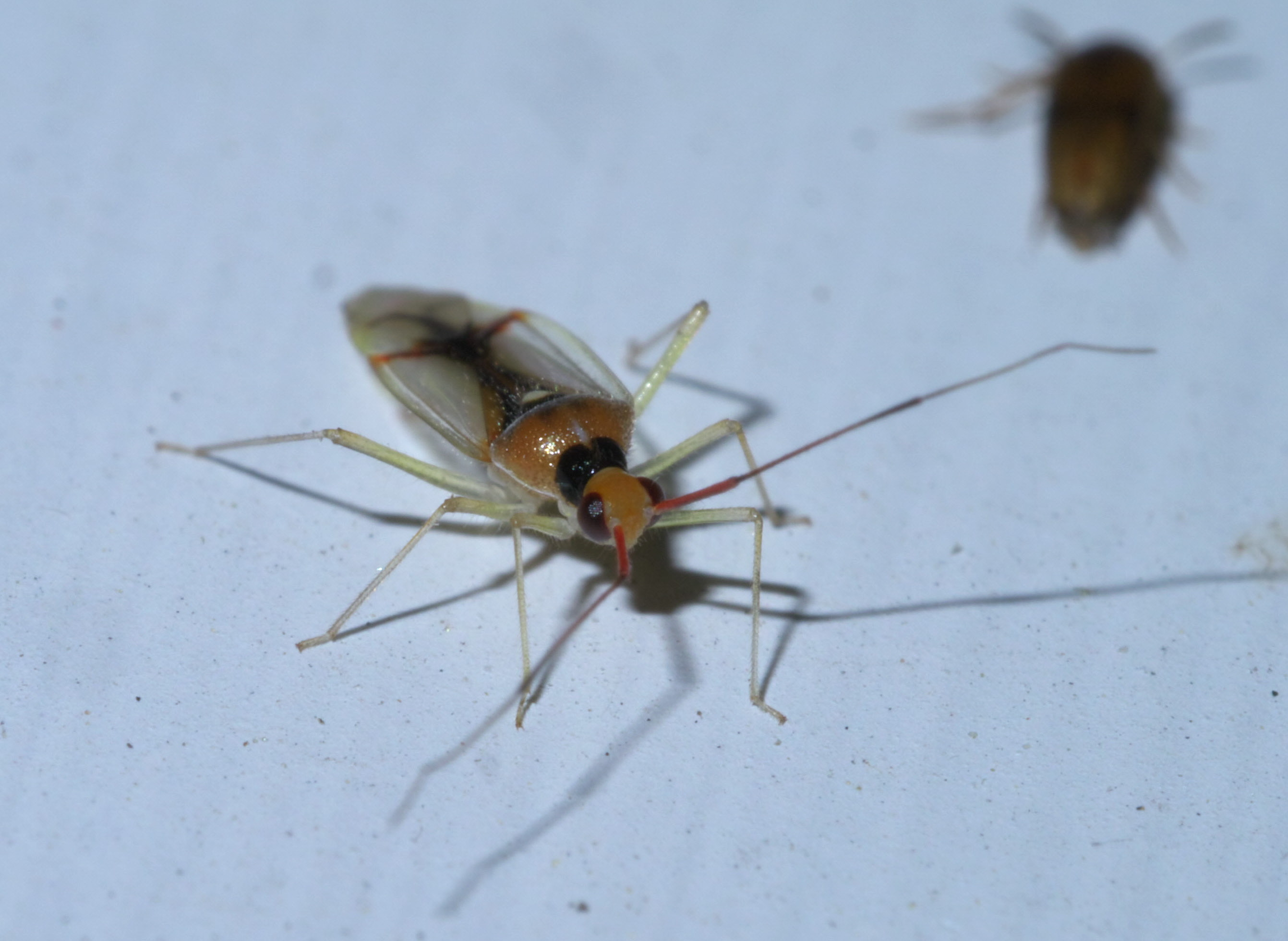
