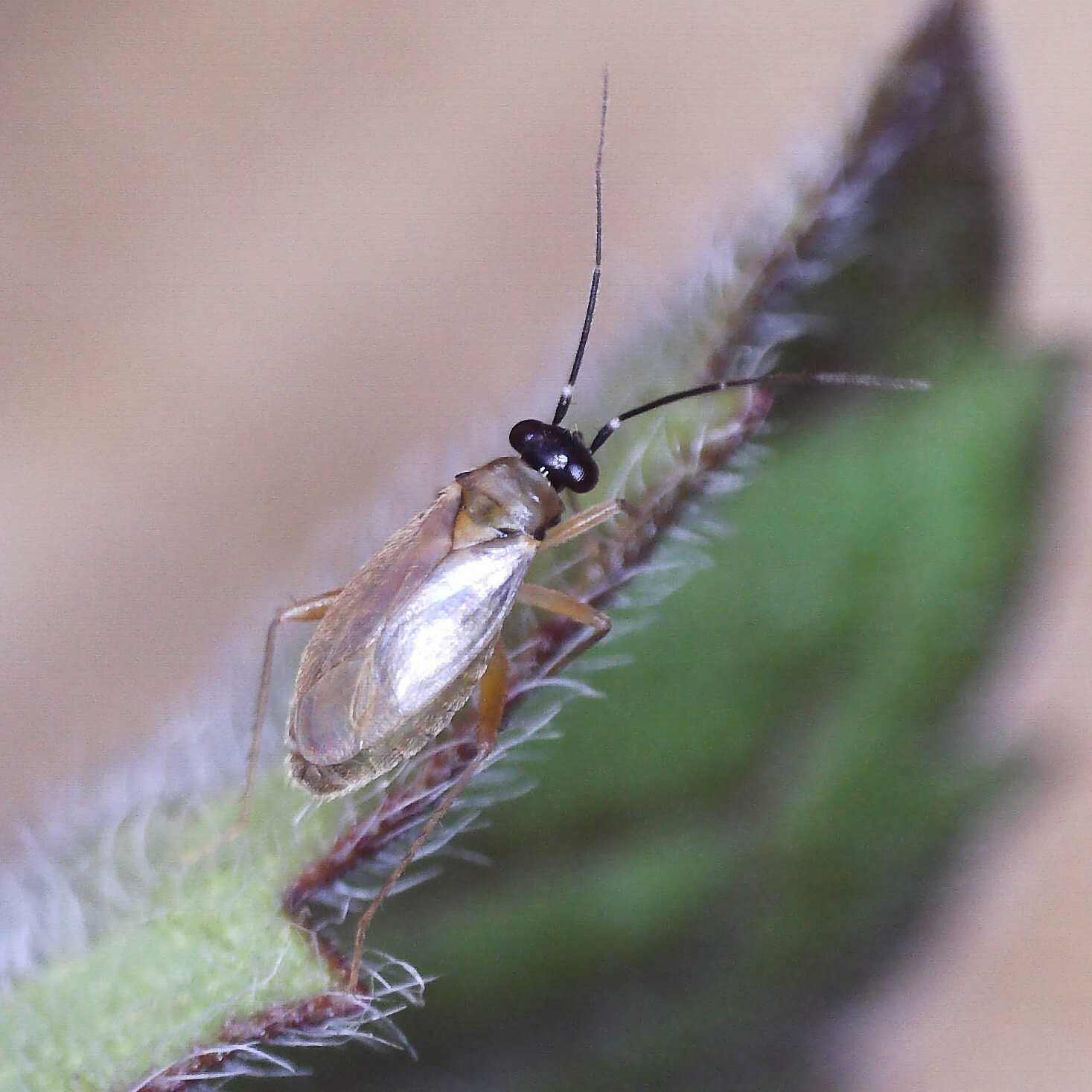

Scientific classification
- Kingdom: Animalia
- Phylum: Arthropoda
- Class: Insecta
- Order: Hemiptera
- Suborder: Heteroptera
- Family: Miridae
- Subfamily: Phylinae
- Tribe: Semiini
- Genus: Tytthus
- Species: T. pygmaeus

Binomial name
- Tytthus pygmaeus (Zetterstedt, 1838)

= Tytthus pygmaeus =

Species of true bug

Tytthus pygmaeus is a Palearctic species of true bug.
