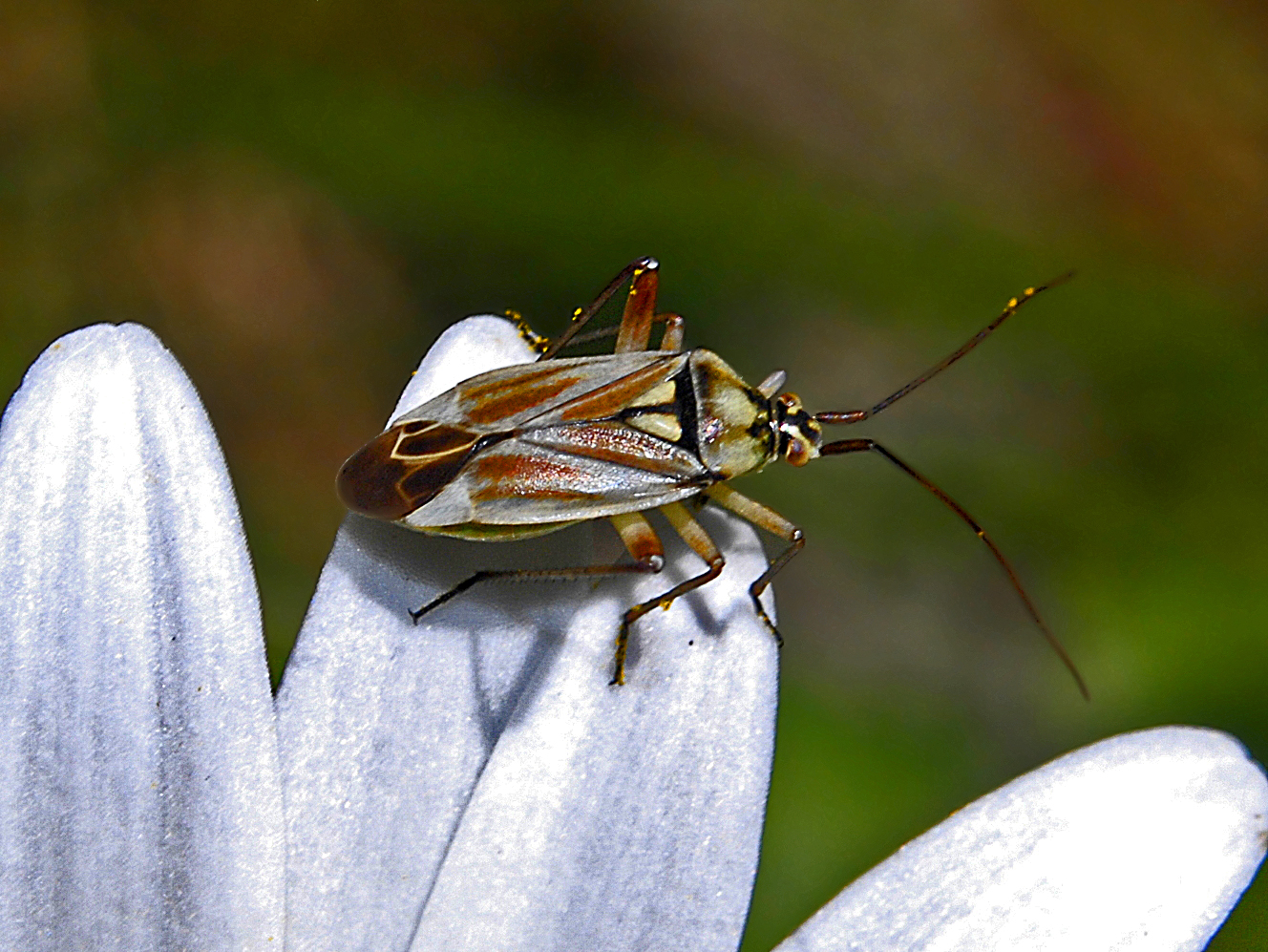
- Calocoris roseomaculatus

Scientific classification
- Kingdom: Animalia
- Phylum: Arthropoda
- Class: Insecta
- Order: Hemiptera
- Suborder: Heteroptera
- Family: Miridae
- Genus: Calocoris
- Species: C. roseomaculatus

Binomial name
- Calocoris roseomaculatus (De Geer, 1773)

Synonyms
- Cimex roseomaculatus De Geer, 1773

= Calocoris roseomaculatus =

Species of true bug

Calocoris roseomaculatus is a species of bugs in the Mirinae subfamily of the Miridae family. It is found in Europe.

== Subspecies ==
Two subspecies are recognized:

- Calocoris roseomaculatus angularis (Fieber, 1864)
- Calocoris roseomaculatus roseomaculatus (De Geer, 1773)

== Description ==
Calocoris roseomaculatus can reach a length of 6–8 millimetres (0.24–0.31 in). This true bug shows distinctive rosy or reddish markings on the whitish forewings and a black longitudinal line on the scutellum. Adults can be found from June until October.

Both adults and larve feed on various Asteraceae and Fabaceae, mainly Lotus formosissimus, Ononis repens and Anthyllis vulneraria.

== Distribution ==
This species is present in most of Europe.

== Habitat ==
Calocoris roseomaculatus lives in dry grasslands.
