= Calocoris angustatus =

Scientific classification
- Kingdom: Animalia
- Phylum: Arthropoda
- Class: Insecta
- Order: Hemiptera
- Suborder: Heteroptera
- Family: Miridae
- Genus: Calocoris
- Species: C. angustatus

Binomial name
- Calocoris angustatus Lethierry, 1893

Species of true bug

Calocoris angustatus, the 'sorghum head bug, is a species of true bug in the family Miridae. It is a pest of sorghum in India, and has also been reported from Kenya and Rwanda.
