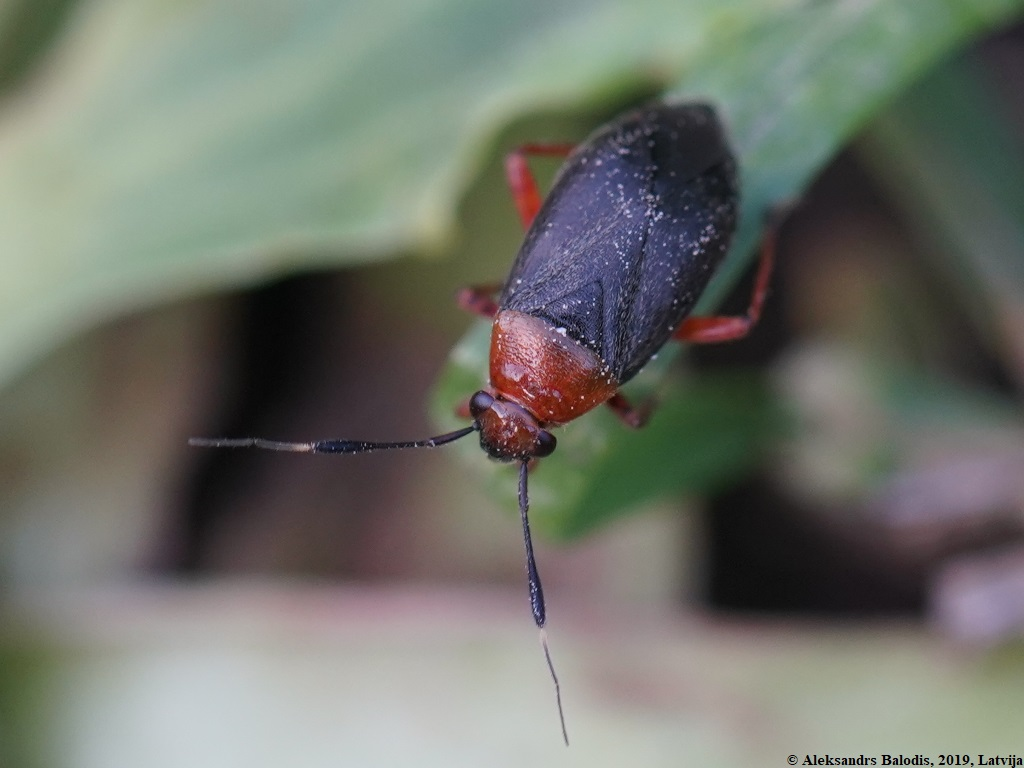

Scientific classification
- Kingdom: Animalia
- Phylum: Arthropoda
- Class: Insecta
- Order: Hemiptera
- Suborder: Heteroptera
- Family: Miridae
- Subfamily: Mirinae
- Tribe: Mirini
- Genus: Capsus
- Species: C. ater

Binomial name
- Capsus ater (Linnaeus, 1758)

Synonyms
- Capsus flavicollis (Fabricius, 1775); Capsus nigricornis Hahn, 1826; Capsus nigripes (Strobl, 1900); Capsus rutilus Stichel, 1930; Capsus semiflavus (Linnaeus, 1767); Capsus sordens (Gmelin, 1790); Capsus tyrannus (Fabricius, 1781); Cimex ater Linnaeus, 1758

= Capsus ater =

Black Plant Bug

Species of true bug

Oviposition

Capsus ater, known as the black plant bug, is a species of bug in the Miridae family that likely originated in North America, but that is now found in Europe and across the Palearctic to Siberia and in North America.

Capsus ater is found in dry to moderately moist, open to partially shaded habitats In the Alps it rises to over 2000 meters above sea level. The bugs live on different grasses (Poaceae) and do not seem to have any particular preference for certain species or genera.
