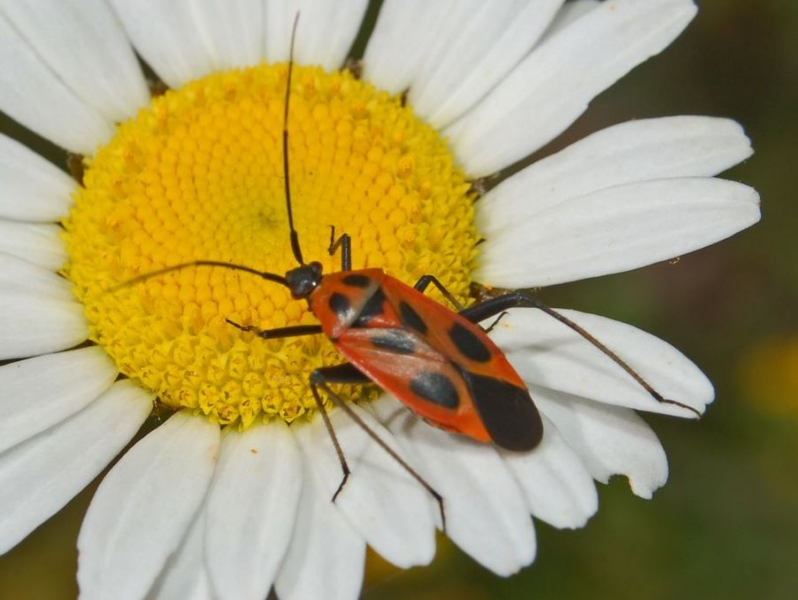
- Calocoris nemoralis f. hispanica, upperside
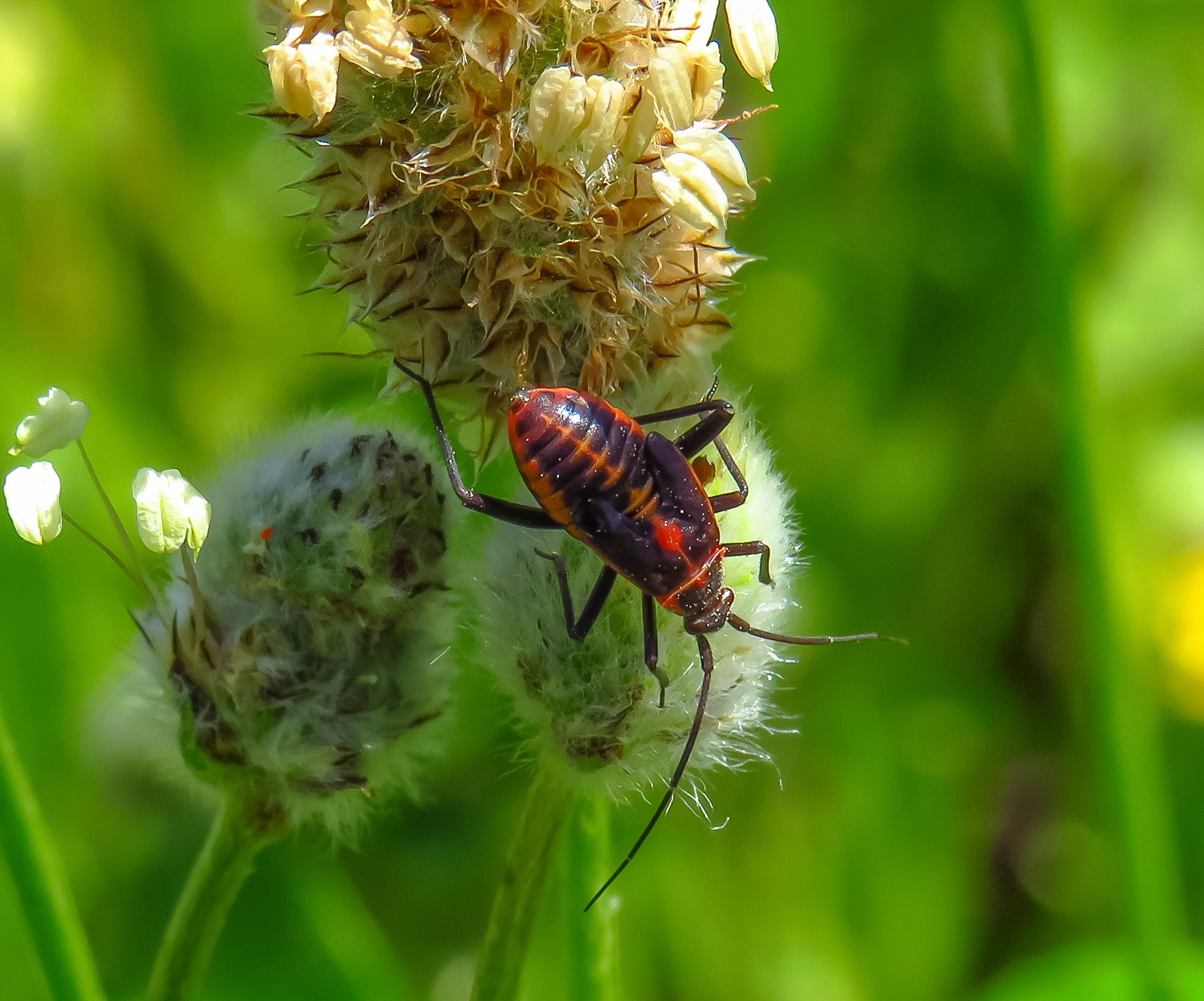
- Nymph

Scientific classification
- Kingdom: Animalia
- Phylum: Arthropoda
- Class: Insecta
- Order: Hemiptera
- Suborder: Heteroptera
- Family: Miridae
- Genus: Calocoris
- Species: C. nemoralis

Binomial name
- Calocoris nemoralis (Fabricius, 1787)

Synonyms
- List: Calocoris sexpunctatus Fabricius 1787; Calocoris piceus Cyrillo 1787; Calocoris hispanicus Gmelin 1790; Calocoris ruficollis Fabricius 1794; Calocoris carcelii Le Peletier and Serville 1825; Calocoris coccineus Dufour 1833; Calocoris nankineus Dufour 1833; Calocoris nigrovittatus Costa, A 1843; Calocoris rubromarginatus Lucas 1849; Calocoris nigridorsum Costa, A 1862; Calocoris zelleri J Scott 1876; Calocoris thoracicus Puton 1884; Calocoris punicus Ferrari 1884; Calocoris cuneatus Puton 1887; Calocoris aterrimus Garbiglietti 1869; Calocoris bimaculatus Reuter 1894; Calocoris confluens Reuter 1896; Calocoris limbatus Reuter 1896; Calocoris hexastigma Reuter 1896; Calocoris pallidus Reuter 1896; Calocoris quadripunctatus Reuter 1902; Calocoris rufipes Reuter 1902; Calocoris erythronotum Reuter 1902; Calocoris bisignatus Reuter 1904; Calocoris vittatus Reuter 1904; Calocoris connectens Reuter 1905; Calocoris rufifemur Horvath 1911; Calocoris kervillei Horvath 1911; Calocoris griseus Vidal 1937; Calocoris erythrocephalus Mancini 1952; Calocoris oculatus Stichel 1957;

= Calocoris nemoralis =

Species of true bug

Calocoris nemoralis is a species of true bugs belonging to the family Miridae or jumping tree bugs, subfamily Mirinae.

== Forms ==
Forms within this species include:

- Calocoris nemoralis f. bimaculata
- Calocoris nemoralis f. hexastigma
- Calocoris nemoralis f. hispanica Gmel.
- Calocoris nemoralis f. picea Cyr.
- Calocoris nemoralis f. nigrovittata Costa
- Calocoris nemoralis f. erytrocephala Mancini
- Calocoris nemoralis f. vittata

== Distribution ==
This species can be found in most of Southern Europe (Cyprus, European Turkey, France, Germany, Greece, Italy, Malta. Portugal and Spain).

== Description ==
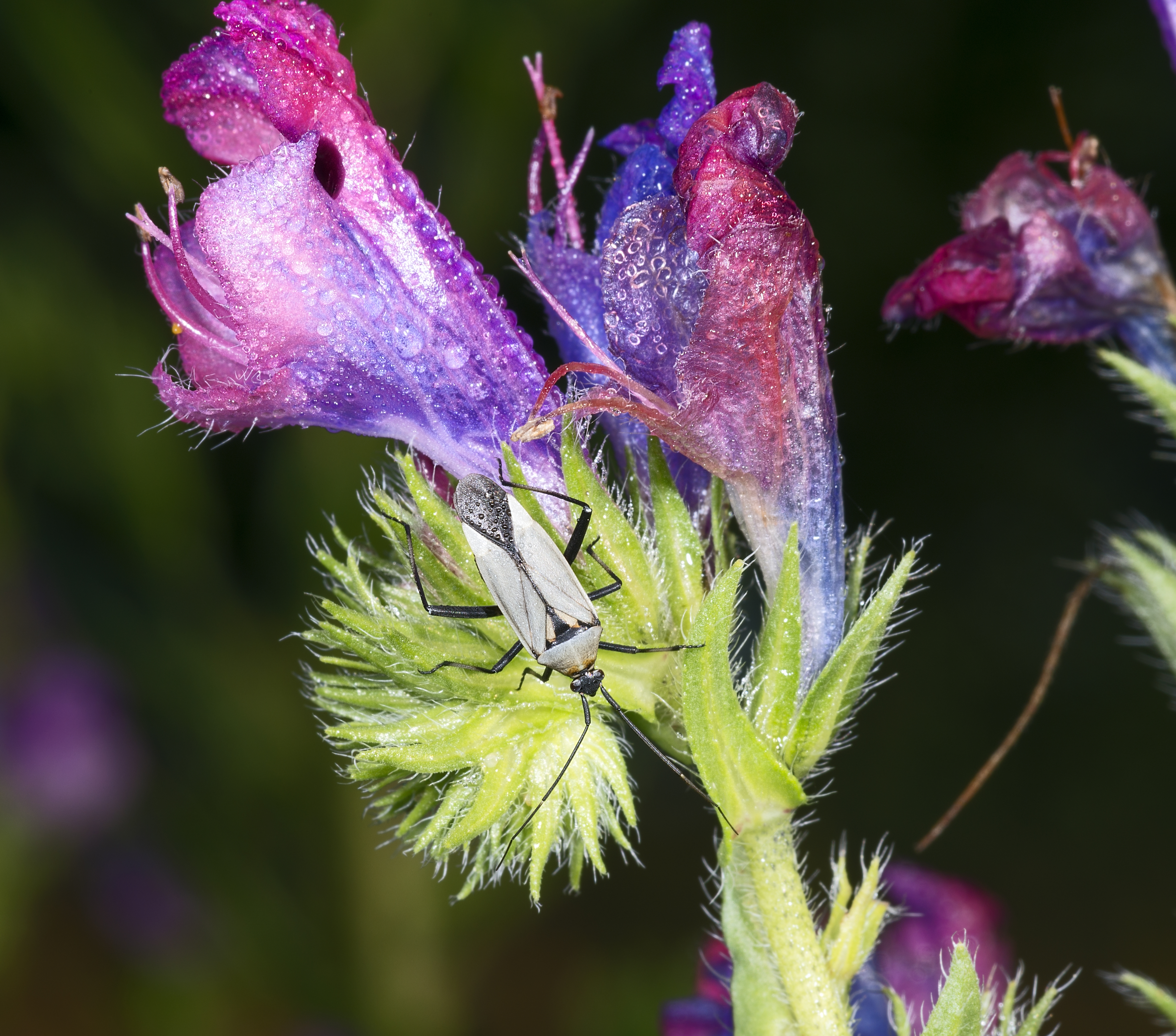
Calocoris nemoralis f. bimaculata

Calocoris nemoralis can reach a length of 8.5–9 millimetres (0.33–0.35 in) in males, of 8.2–9.5 millimetres (0.32–0.37 in) in females. Bodies af these bugs are elongated. The head is black, very rarely clear. The dorsal surface is covered with dense black hairs. The membrane is black. Legs are black, femurs and tibiae are often partly red or yellow.

Calocoris nemoralis is usually red coloured with black dots. This species presents many forms, with an enormous variability in colors, that may be white, black, gray, yellowish, greenish or blood red, with and without black spots.

== Biology ==
Adults of these bugs can be found from June to September. The main host plants are Cirsium, Carduus and Silybum species. Eggs overwinter.
