= Hyaliodes brevis =

Scientific classification
- Domain: Eukaryota
- Kingdom: Animalia
- Phylum: Arthropoda
- Class: Insecta
- Order: Hemiptera
- Suborder: Heteroptera
- Family: Miridae
- Tribe: Hyaliodini
- Genus: Hyaliodes
- Species: H. brevis

Binomial name
- Hyaliodes brevis Knight, 1941

Species of true bug

Hyaliodes brevis is a species of plant bug in the family Miridae. It is found in North America.
