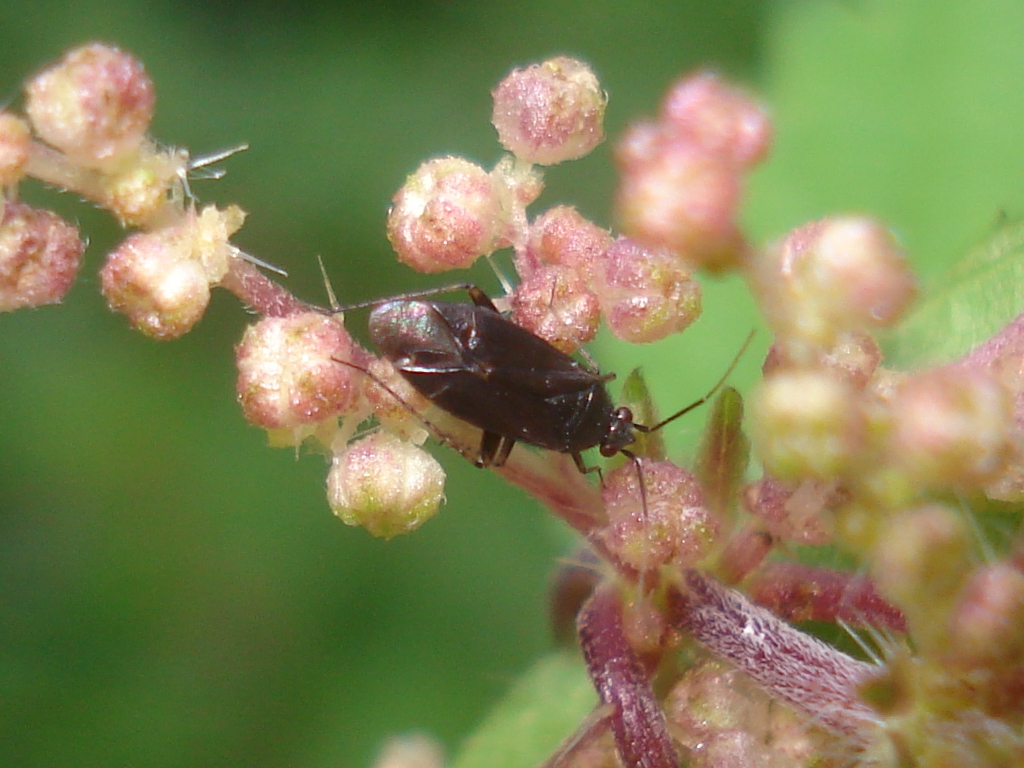

Scientific classification
- Domain: Eukaryota
- Kingdom: Animalia
- Phylum: Arthropoda
- Class: Insecta
- Order: Hemiptera
- Suborder: Heteroptera
- Family: Miridae
- Genus: Phoenicocoris
- Species: P. obscurellus

Binomial name
- Phoenicocoris obscurellus (Fallen, 1829)

Synonyms
- Sthenarus obscurellus Horvath, 1888

= Phoenicocoris obscurellus =

Species of true bug

Phoenicocoris obscurellus is a species of plant bugs belonging to the family Miridae, subfamily Phylinae that is found throughout continental Europe and the British Isles, except for southeastern Europe.
