= Irbisia oreas =

Scientific classification
- Kingdom: Animalia
- Phylum: Arthropoda
- Clade: Pancrustacea
- Class: Insecta
- Order: Hemiptera
- Suborder: Heteroptera
- Family: Miridae
- Tribe: Mirini
- Genus: Irbisia
- Species: I. oreas

Binomial name
- Irbisia oreas Bliven, 1963

Species of true bug

Irbisia oreas is a species of plant bug in the family Miridae. It is found in Central America and North America.
