= Tytthus fuscicornis =

Scientific classification
- Kingdom: Animalia
- Phylum: Arthropoda
- Clade: Pancrustacea
- Class: Insecta
- Order: Hemiptera
- Suborder: Heteroptera
- Family: Miridae
- Genus: Tytthus
- Species: T. fuscicornis

Binomial name
- Tytthus fuscicornis Henry, 2012

Species of Insect

Tytthus fuscicornis is a species of insect in the family Miridae. It was first described by Thomas J. Henry in 2012 and is native to California, USA.
