= Mecomma gilvipes =

Scientific classification
- Kingdom: Animalia
- Phylum: Arthropoda
- Class: Insecta
- Order: Hemiptera
- Suborder: Heteroptera
- Family: Miridae
- Tribe: Orthotylini
- Genus: Mecomma
- Species: M. gilvipes

Binomial name
- Mecomma gilvipes (Stal, 1858)

Species of true bug

Mecomma gilvipes is a species of plant bug in the family Miridae. It is found in North America.
