= Irbisia serrata =

Scientific classification
- Kingdom: Animalia
- Phylum: Arthropoda
- Class: Insecta
- Order: Hemiptera
- Suborder: Heteroptera
- Family: Miridae
- Tribe: Mirini
- Genus: Irbisia
- Species: I. serrata

Binomial name
- Irbisia serrata Bliven, 1963

Species of true bug

Irbisia serrata is a species of plant bug in the family Miridae. It is found in North America.
