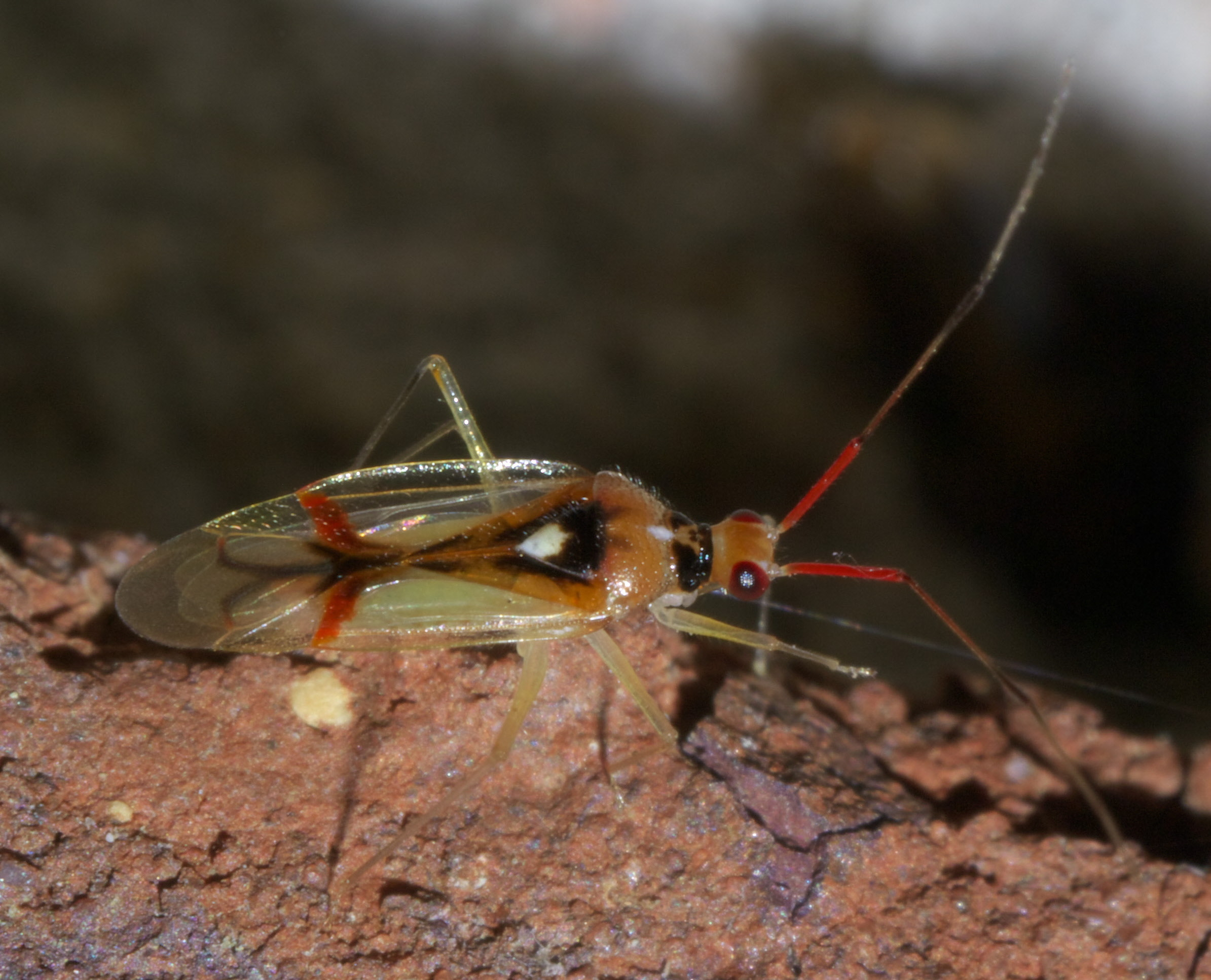
- Hyaliodes harti

Scientific classification
- Kingdom: Animalia
- Phylum: Arthropoda
- Class: Insecta
- Order: Hemiptera
- Suborder: Heteroptera
- Family: Miridae
- Tribe: Hyaliodini
- Genus: Hyaliodes; Reuter, 1876

= Hyaliodes =

Genus of true bugs

Hyaliodes is a genus of plant bugs in the family Miridae. There are at least 20 described species in Hyaliodes.

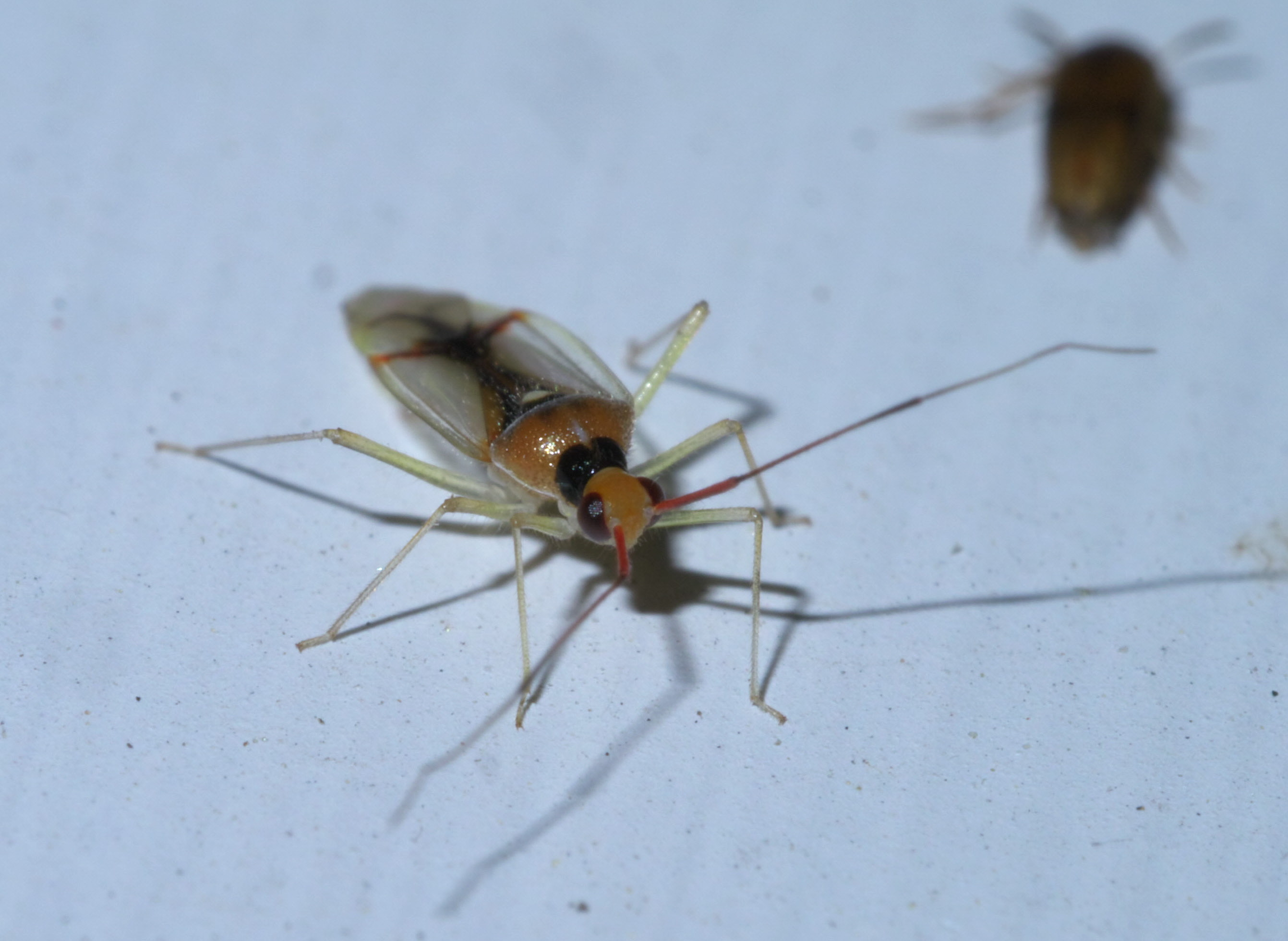
Hyaliodes harti

== Species ==
These 24 species belong to the genus Hyaliodes:

- Hyaliodes beckeri Carvalho, 1953
- Hyaliodes binotatus Carvalho, 1953
- Hyaliodes brevis Knight, 1941
- Hyaliodes costaricensis Carvalho, 1953
- Hyaliodes decoloris (Distant, 1884)
- Hyaliodes ecuadorensis Carvalho and Gomes, 1968
- Hyaliodes glabratus (Distant, 1888)
- Hyaliodes guadalupensis Carvalho, 1985
- Hyaliodes harti Knight, 1941
- Hyaliodes hexapunctatus Carvalho, 1985
- Hyaliodes inca Carvalho, 1955
- Hyaliodes intercallosus Carvalho, 1985
- Hyaliodes litreae (Reed, 1901)
- Hyaliodes mascarenensis Carvalho and Gomes, 1972
- Hyaliodes minensis Carvalho, 1985
- Hyaliodes nani Maldonado, 1969
- Hyaliodes ochraceus Carvalho, 1985
- Hyaliodes peruana Carvalho, 1945
- Hyaliodes roraimensis Carvalho, 1953
- Hyaliodes rubricolor Carvalho, 1985
- Hyaliodes vitreus (Distant, 1884)
- Hyaliodes vitripennis (Say, 1832)
- Hyaliodes vittaticornis Bruner, 1934
- Hyaliodes wygodzinskyi Carvalho, 1945
