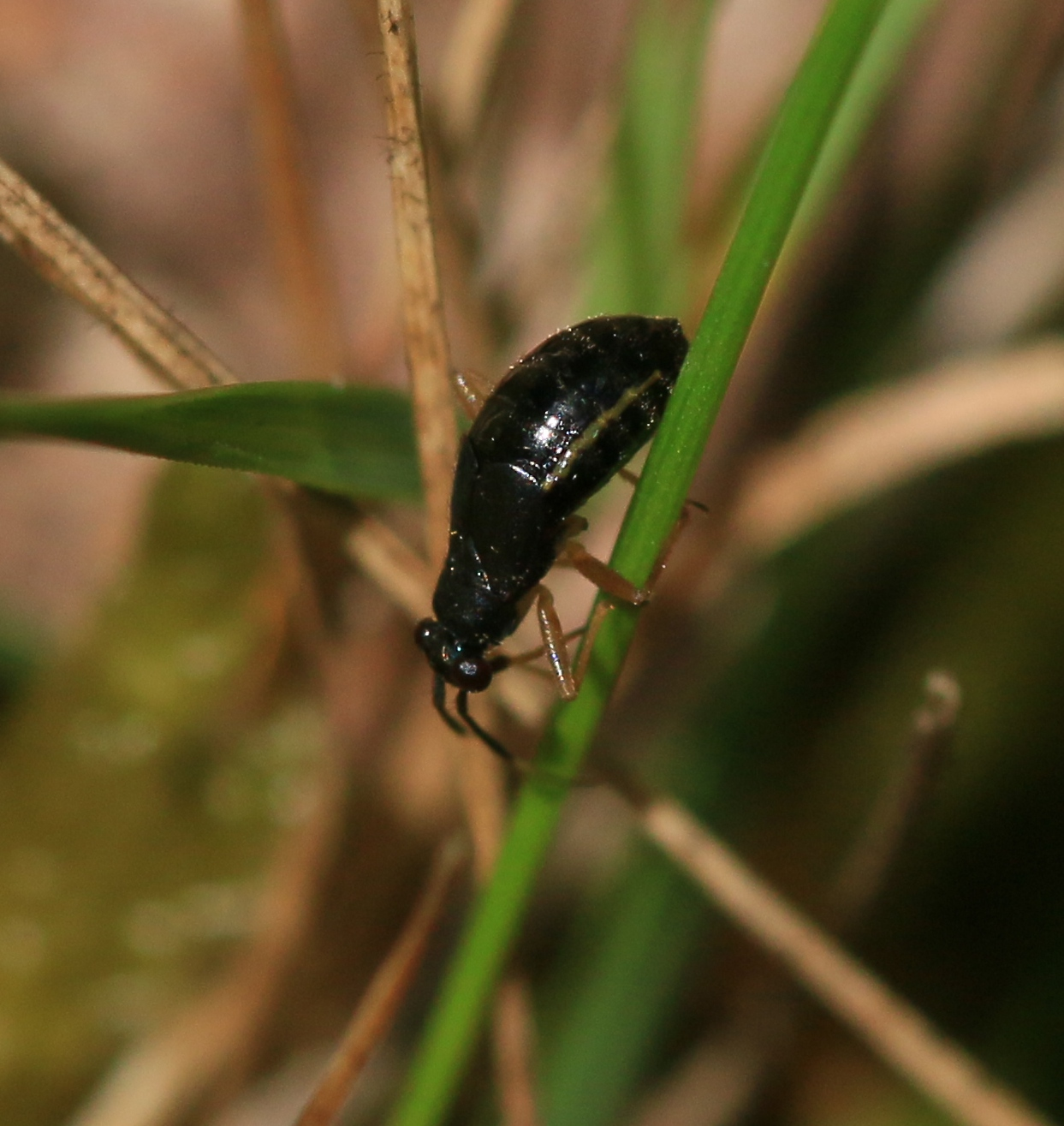

Scientific classification
- Kingdom: Animalia
- Phylum: Arthropoda
- Clade: Pancrustacea
- Class: Insecta
- Order: Hemiptera
- Suborder: Heteroptera
- Family: Miridae
- Subfamily: Orthotylinae
- Tribe: Orthotylini
- Genus: Mecomma; Fieber, 1858

= Mecomma =

Genus of true bugs

Mecomma is a genus of plant bugs in the family Miridae. There are more than 30 described species in Mecomma.

== Species ==
These 34 species belong to the genus Mecomma:

- Mecomma ambulans (Fallén, 1807)
- Mecomma amicus (Distant, 1909)
- Mecomma angustata (Uhler, 1895)
- Mecomma angustatum (Uhler, 1895)
- Mecomma angusticollis Linnavuori, 1973
- Mecomma antennata Van Duzee, 1917
- Mecomma antennatum Van Duzee, 1917
- Mecomma bradora Kelton, 1960
- Mecomma capitata Liu & Zheng, 1993
- Mecomma chinensis Reuter, 1906
- Mecomma crassicornis Liu & Yamamoto, 2004
- Mecomma dispar (Boheman, 1852)
- Mecomma filius (Distant, 1910)
- Mecomma fumida Linnavuori, 1975
- Mecomma gansuana Liu & Zheng, 1993
- Mecomma gilvipes (Stal, 1858)
- Mecomma grandis Carvalho & Southwood, 1955
- Mecomma imitambulans Liu & Yamamoto, 2004
- Mecomma japonica Miyamoto, 1966
- Mecomma juno Linnavuori, 1994
- Mecomma kharon Linnavuori, 1994
- Mecomma khrysothemis Linnavuori, 1994
- Mecomma lodosi Onder, 1979
- Mecomma lushuiensis Liu & Yamamoto, 2004
- Mecomma madagascariensis Reuter, 1892
- Mecomma opaca Liu & Zheng, 1993
- Mecomma orientalis Carvalho & Southwood, 1955
- Mecomma pervinius Onder, 1974
- Mecomma rectangulus (Ghauri, 1970)
- Mecomma ruficeps Linnavuori, 1994
- Mecomma ruwenzoriense Ghauri, 1964
- Mecomma shaanxiensis Liu & Yamamoto, 2004
- Mecomma stenata Liu & Yamamoto, 2004
- Mecomma xiongi Liu & Yamamoto, 2004
