= Phoenicocoris rostratus =

Scientific classification
- Kingdom: Animalia
- Phylum: Arthropoda
- Class: Insecta
- Order: Hemiptera
- Suborder: Heteroptera
- Family: Miridae
- Tribe: Phylini
- Genus: Phoenicocoris
- Species: P. rostratus

Binomial name
- Phoenicocoris rostratus (Knight, 1923)

Synonyms
- Lepidopsallus olseni Knight, 1923; Lepidopsallus rostratus Knight, 1923; Phoenicocoris olseni (Knight, 1923)

Species of true bug

Phoenicocoris rostratus is a species of plant bug in the family Miridae. It is found in North America.
