= Phoenicocoris dissimilis =

Scientific classification
- Kingdom: Animalia
- Phylum: Arthropoda
- Class: Insecta
- Order: Hemiptera
- Suborder: Heteroptera
- Family: Miridae
- Genus: Phoenicocoris
- Species: P. dissimilis

Binomial name
- Phoenicocoris dissimilis (Reuter, 1878)

Synonyms
- Phoenicocoris carbonarius (Horvath, 1888); Sthenarus carbonarius Horvath, 1888; Sthenarus dissimilis Reuter, 1878

Species of true bug

Phoenicocoris dissimilis is a species of plant bugs belonging to the family Miridae, subfamily Phylinae that can be found in Denmark, France, Germany, Poland, Norway, Romania, Slovakia, Spain, and Ukraine.
