= Irbisia solani =

Scientific classification
- Kingdom: Animalia
- Phylum: Arthropoda
- Class: Insecta
- Order: Hemiptera
- Suborder: Heteroptera
- Family: Miridae
- Tribe: Mirini
- Genus: Irbisia
- Species: I. solani

Binomial name
- Irbisia solani (Heidemann, 1910)

Synonyms
- Irbisia brachycerus solani (Heidemann, 1910); Capsus solani Heidemann, 1910

Species of true bug

Irbisia solani is a species of plant bug in the family Miridae. It is found in North America.
