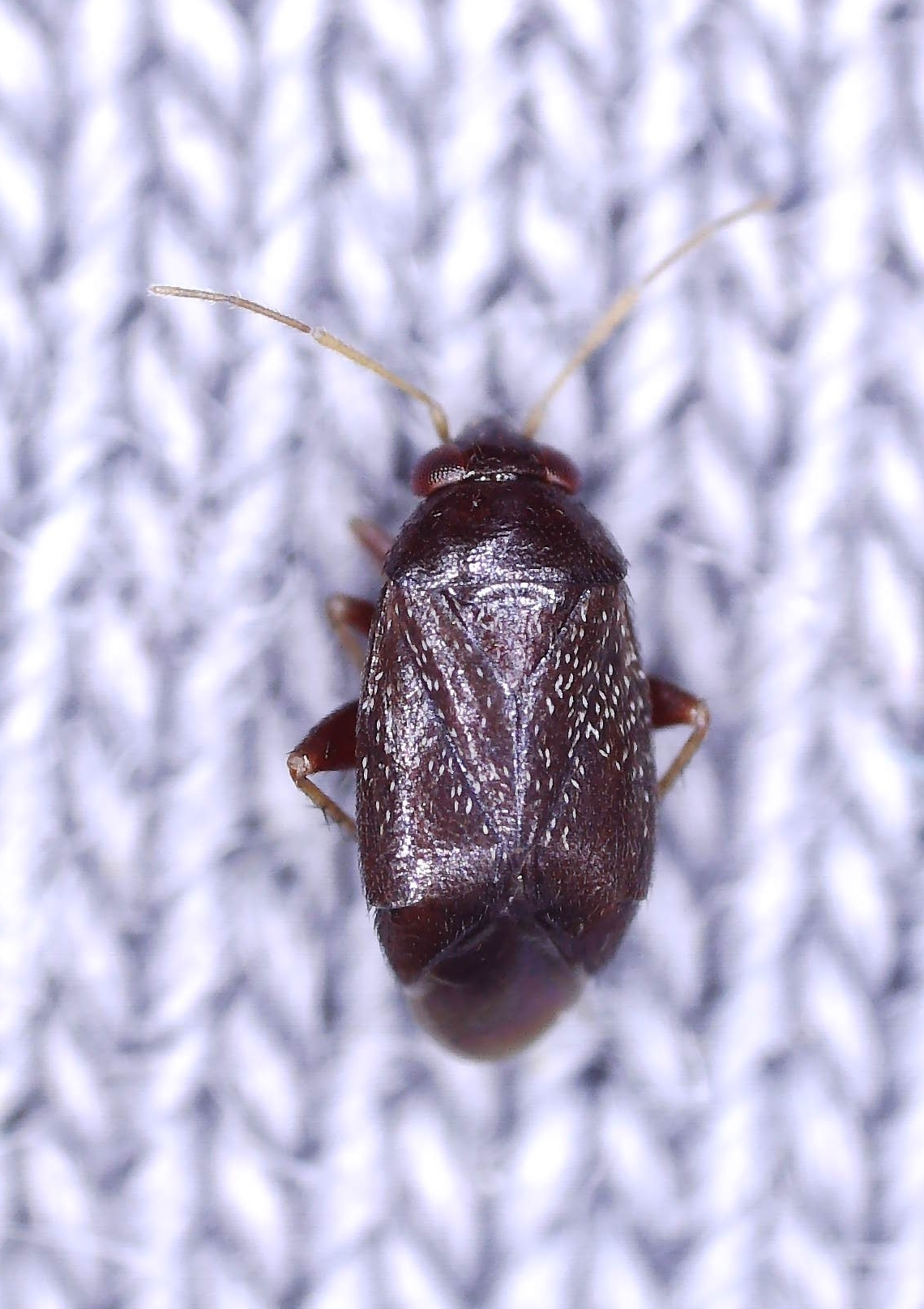

Scientific classification
- Kingdom: Animalia
- Phylum: Arthropoda
- Class: Insecta
- Order: Hemiptera
- Suborder: Heteroptera
- Family: Miridae
- Genus: Phoenicocoris
- Species: P. modestus

Binomial name
- Phoenicocoris modestus (Meyer-Dür, 1843)

Synonyms
- Capsus modestus Meyer-Dür, 1843

= Phoenicocoris modestus =

Species of true bug

Phoenicocoris modestus is a species of plant bug belonging to the family Miridae that is found in western Europe and Scandinavia.
