= Parapsallus vitellinus =

Scientific classification
- Kingdom: Animalia
- Phylum: Arthropoda
- Class: Insecta
- Order: Hemiptera
- Suborder: Heteroptera
- Family: Miridae
- Genus: Parapsallus
- Species: P. vitellinus

Binomial name
- Parapsallus vitellinus (Scholtz, 1847)

Synonyms
- Capsus vitellinus Scholtz, 1847

Species of true bug

Parapsallus vitellinus is a species of plant bug belonging to the family Miridae, subfamily Phylinae, that can be found everywhere in Europe except for Albania, Andorra, Greece, Lithuania, Norway, all states of former Yugoslavia, and various European and African islands.
