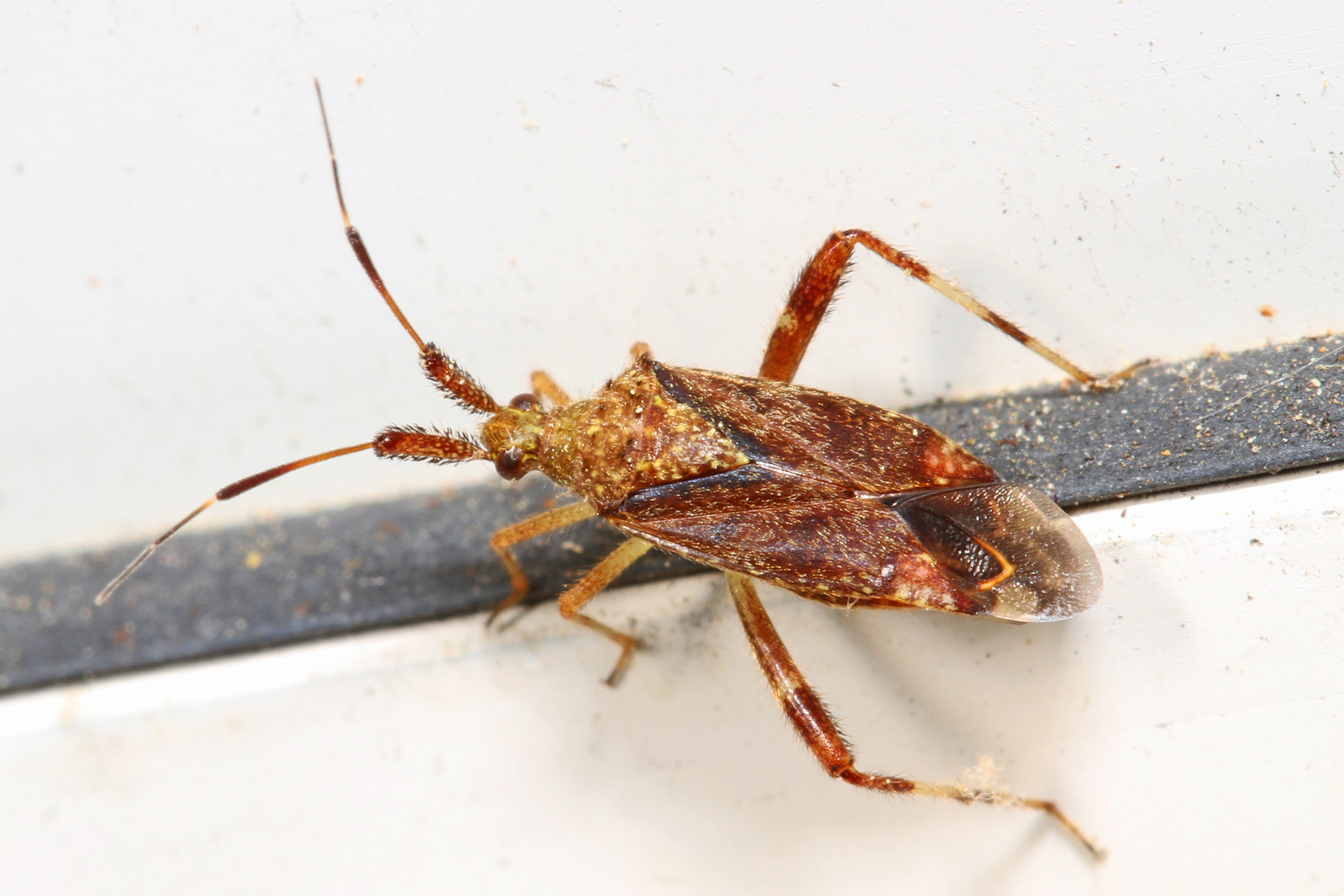

Scientific classification
- Kingdom: Animalia
- Phylum: Arthropoda
- Class: Insecta
- Order: Hemiptera
- Suborder: Heteroptera
- Family: Miridae
- Genus: Neurocolpus
- Species: N. nubilus

Binomial name
- Neurocolpus nubilus (Say, 1832)

Synonyms
- Capsus nubilus Say, 1832

= Neurocolpus nubilus =

Species of true bug

Neurocolpus nubilus, the clouded plant bug, is a species of plant bug in the family Miridae. It is found in North America. It feeds on a variety of plants, including cotton, alfalfa, burdock seedhead, milkweed, soybeans, and various species of clovers and nettles.
