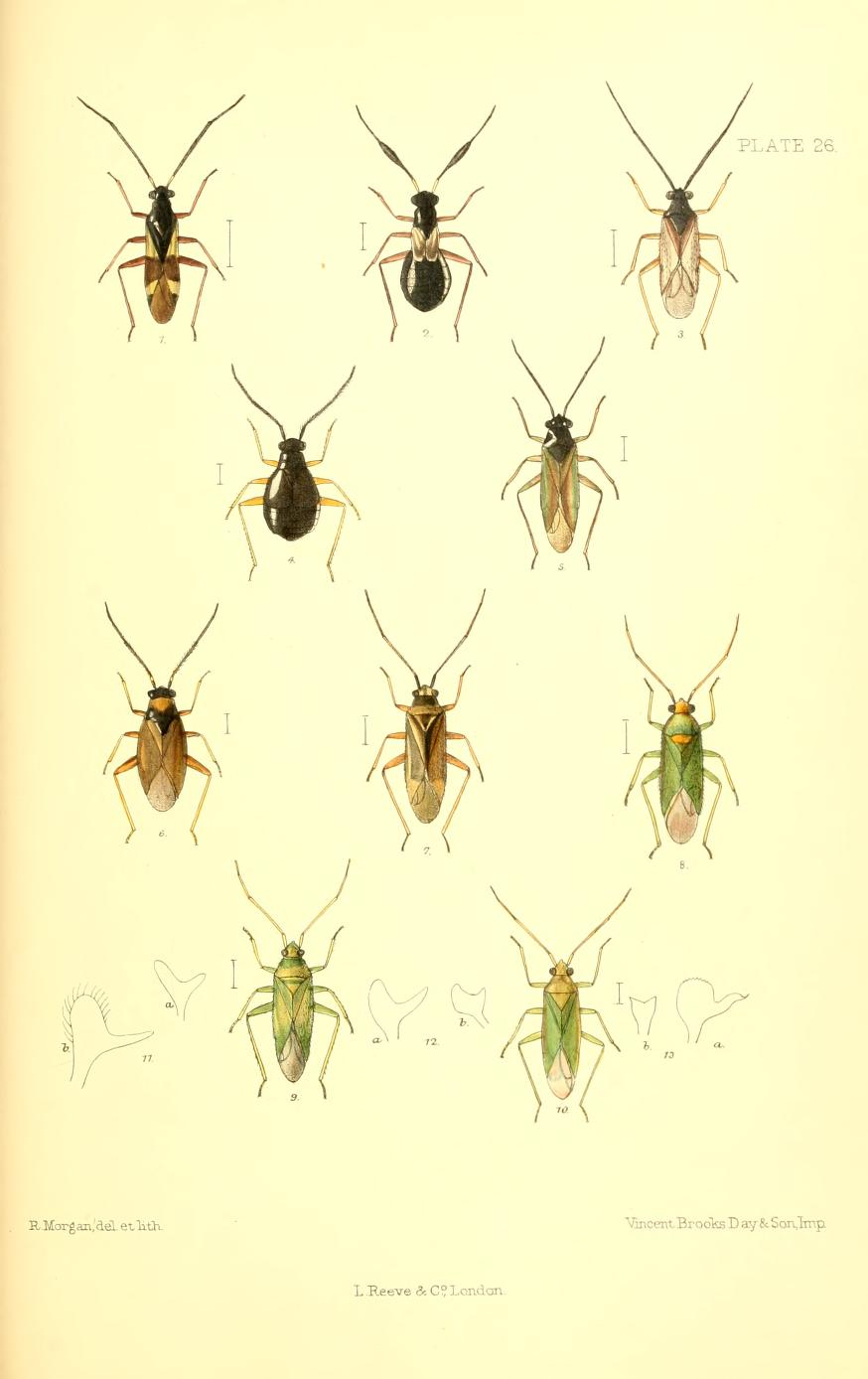
- Mecomma ambulans depicted in Edward Saunders Hemiptera Heteroptera of the British Islands (figure 3 male, 4 female)

Scientific classification
- Kingdom: Animalia
- Phylum: Arthropoda
- Class: Insecta
- Order: Hemiptera
- Suborder: Heteroptera
- Family: Miridae
- Genus: Mecomma
- Species: M. ambulans

Binomial name
- Mecomma ambulans (Fallen, 1807)

Synonyms
- Capsus gramineti Gistel, 1857

= Mecomma ambulans =

Species of true bug

Mecomma ambulans is a species of bug in the Miridae family that can be found throughout Europe (except for Portugal) and the far north, and through the Palearctic as far east as China. The species have black pronotum with brown wings and yellow legs, all of which is similar to Tupiocoris rhododendri.
