= Tytthus pubescens =

Scientific classification
- Kingdom: Animalia
- Phylum: Arthropoda
- Class: Insecta
- Order: Hemiptera
- Suborder: Heteroptera
- Family: Miridae
- Genus: Tytthus
- Species: T. pubescens

Binomial name
- Tytthus pubescens (Knight, 1931)

Species of true bug

Tytthus pubescens is a species of true bug, belonging to the genus Tytthus.

It has cosmopolitan distribution.
