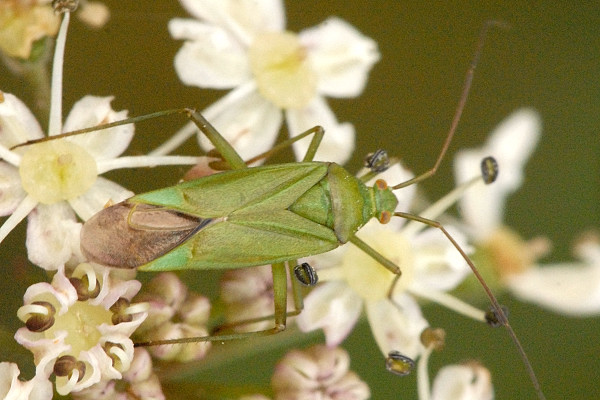
- C. affinis on a flower

Scientific classification
- Kingdom: Animalia
- Phylum: Arthropoda
- Clade: Pancrustacea
- Class: Insecta
- Order: Hemiptera
- Suborder: Heteroptera
- Family: Miridae
- Genus: Calocoris
- Species: C. affinis

Binomial name
- Calocoris affinis (Herrich-Schäffer, 1835)

Synonyms
- Capsus affinis Herrich-Schäffer, 1835; Adelphocoris salviae Carvalho, 1959; Phytocoris salviae Hahn, 1835; Calocoris salviae (Hahn, 1835)

= Calocoris affinis =

Species of true bug

Calocoris affinis is a species of bug in the family Miridae, subfamily Mirinae. It is widespread in Europe.

== Distribution ==
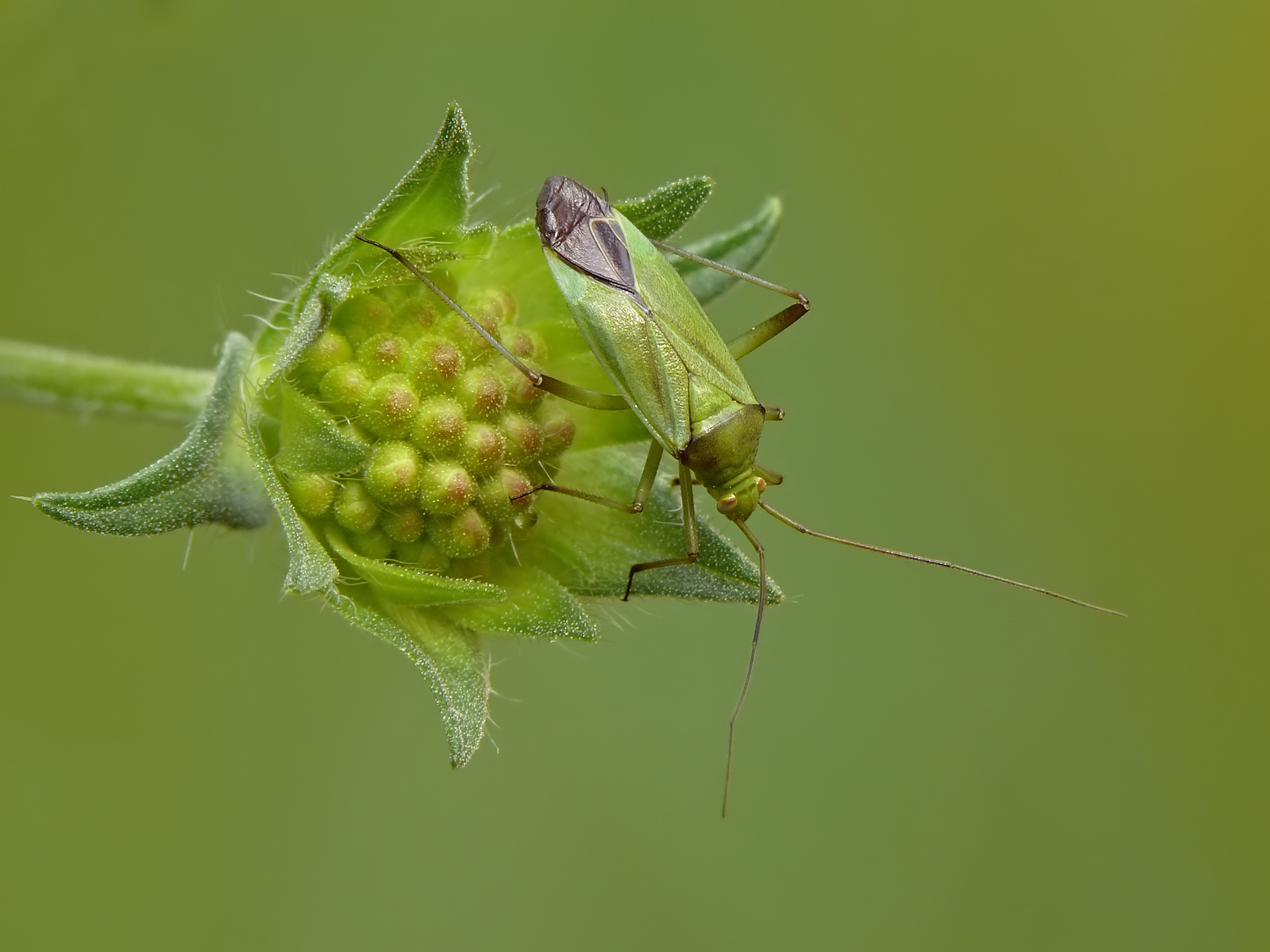
C. affinis on a leaf

It is distributed in most of Europe, but absent from Greece, the British Isles, and northern Fennoscandia. It occurs on meadows.

== Characteristics ==
Adults are 6.6 to 8.3 mm long. Overwintering takes place as eggs while the adults can be observed in the summer from June to August.

=== Diet ===
It is polyphagous, feeding on, e.g., Urtica dioica, Heracleum sphondylium, and Centaurea jacea.
