= Cyrtopeltocoris albofasciatus =

Scientific classification
- Kingdom: Animalia
- Phylum: Arthropoda
- Class: Insecta
- Order: Hemiptera
- Suborder: Heteroptera
- Family: Miridae
- Tribe: Hallodapini
- Genus: Cyrtopeltocoris
- Species: C. albofasciatus

Binomial name
- Cyrtopeltocoris albofasciatus Reuter, 1876

Species of true bug

Cyrtopeltocoris albofasciatus is a species of plant bug in the family Miridae. It is found in North America.
