= Coquillettia mimetica =

Scientific classification
- Kingdom: Animalia
- Phylum: Arthropoda
- Class: Insecta
- Order: Hemiptera
- Suborder: Heteroptera
- Family: Miridae
- Tribe: Cremnorrhinini
- Genus: Coquillettia
- Species: C. mimetica

Binomial name
- Coquillettia mimetica Osborn, 1898

Species of true bug

Coquillettia mimetica is a species of plant bug in the family Miridae. It is found in North America.

== Subspecies ==
These three subspecies belong to the species Coquillettia mimetica:

- Coquillettia mimetica floridana Knight, 1927
- Coquillettia mimetica laticeps Knight, 1927
- Coquillettia mimetica mimetica Osborn, 1898
