= Orectoderus montanus =

Scientific classification
- Kingdom: Animalia
- Phylum: Arthropoda
- Class: Insecta
- Order: Hemiptera
- Suborder: Heteroptera
- Family: Miridae
- Tribe: Cremnorrhinini
- Genus: Orectoderus
- Species: O. montanus

Binomial name
- Orectoderus montanus Knight, 1968

Species of true bug

Orectoderus montanus is a species of plant bug in the family Miridae. It is found in North America.
