= Teleorhinus =

Teleorhinus may refer to:

- Teleorhinus (bug), a genus of bugs
- Terminonaris, a genus of extinct archosaurs, previously known as Teleorhinus
