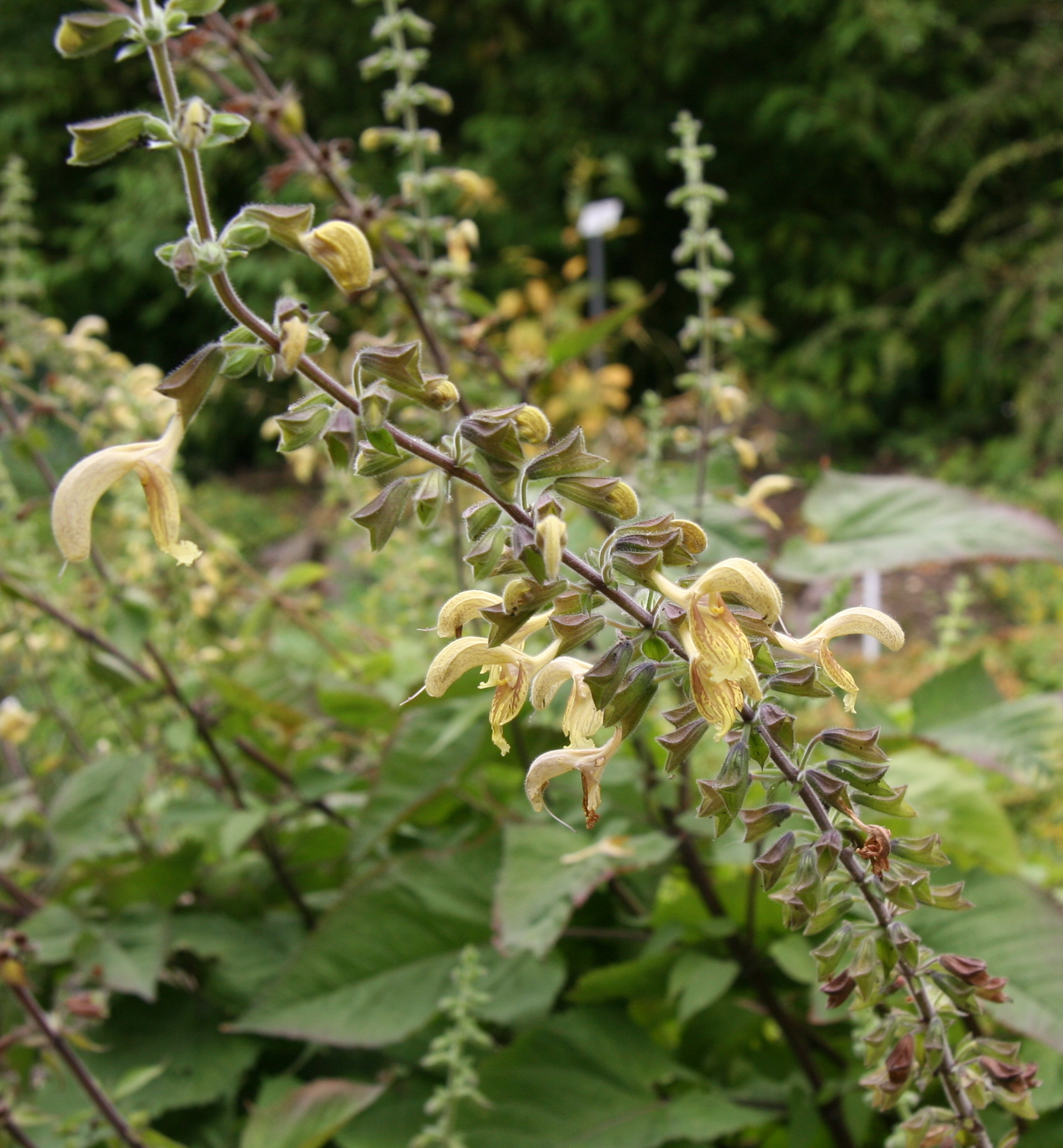

Scientific classification
- Kingdom: Plantae
- Clade: Tracheophytes
- Clade: Angiosperms
- Clade: Eudicots
- Clade: Asterids
- Order: Lamiales
- Family: Lamiaceae
- Genus: Salvia
- Species: S. nubicola

Binomial name
- Salvia nubicola Wall. ex Sweet

= Salvia nubicola =

Species of plant

Salvia nubicola is a herbaceous perennial native to a wide region that includes Afghanistan, Bhutan, India, Pakistan, southwest Asia, and Europe. The plant grows at elevations of 2,000 to 4,300 m (6,600 to 14,100 ft) in dry forests, often with Pinus wallichiana, typically growing in large colonies in woodland clearings. It is especially common in the Muktinath Valley, and is used in traditional Tibetan medicine.

The specific epithet nubicola means "dweller among the clouds," referring to its high mountain habitat. For many years, it was considered the same plant as the similar European Salvia glutinosa (Sticky sage).

Salvia nubicola reaches 3 ft (0.91 m) high and wide, growing upright, with fresh-green colored leaves that are triangular shaped, with the largest, approximately 5 in (13 cm), growing at the base of the plant. The petiole is typically about the same length as the leaf blade. The plant puts out numerous 10 in (25 cm) long inflorescences holding pale yellow flowers, in whorls of two to six, that have finely spotted maroon markings on the upper lip. The calyx is bright green, hairy, sticky, and glandular, giving off a medicinal odor when rubbed, described by one author as "resembling the distinct odour of a billy-goat," all of which cause animals to avoid it in its native habitat.
