= Coquillettia albiclava =

Scientific classification
- Kingdom: Animalia
- Phylum: Arthropoda
- Class: Insecta
- Order: Hemiptera
- Suborder: Heteroptera
- Family: Miridae
- Tribe: Cremnorrhinini
- Genus: Coquillettia
- Species: C. albiclava

Binomial name
- Coquillettia albiclava Knight, 1925

Species of true bug

Coquillettia albiclava is a species of plant bug in the family Miridae. It is found in North America.
