= Teleorhinus tephrosicola =

Scientific classification
- Kingdom: Animalia
- Phylum: Arthropoda
- Class: Insecta
- Order: Hemiptera
- Suborder: Heteroptera
- Family: Miridae
- Tribe: Hallodapini
- Genus: Teleorhinus
- Species: T. tephrosicola

Binomial name
- Teleorhinus tephrosicola Knight, 1923

Species of true bug

Teleorhinus tephrosicola is a species of plant bug in the family Miridae. It is found in North America.
