= Pronotocrepis clavicornis =

Scientific classification
- Kingdom: Animalia
- Phylum: Arthropoda
- Clade: Pancrustacea
- Class: Insecta
- Order: Hemiptera
- Suborder: Heteroptera
- Family: Miridae
- Tribe: Cremnorrhinini
- Genus: Pronotocrepis
- Species: P. clavicornis

Binomial name
- Pronotocrepis clavicornis Knight, 1929

Species of true bug

Pronotocrepis clavicornis is a species of plant bug in the family Miridae. It is found in North America.
