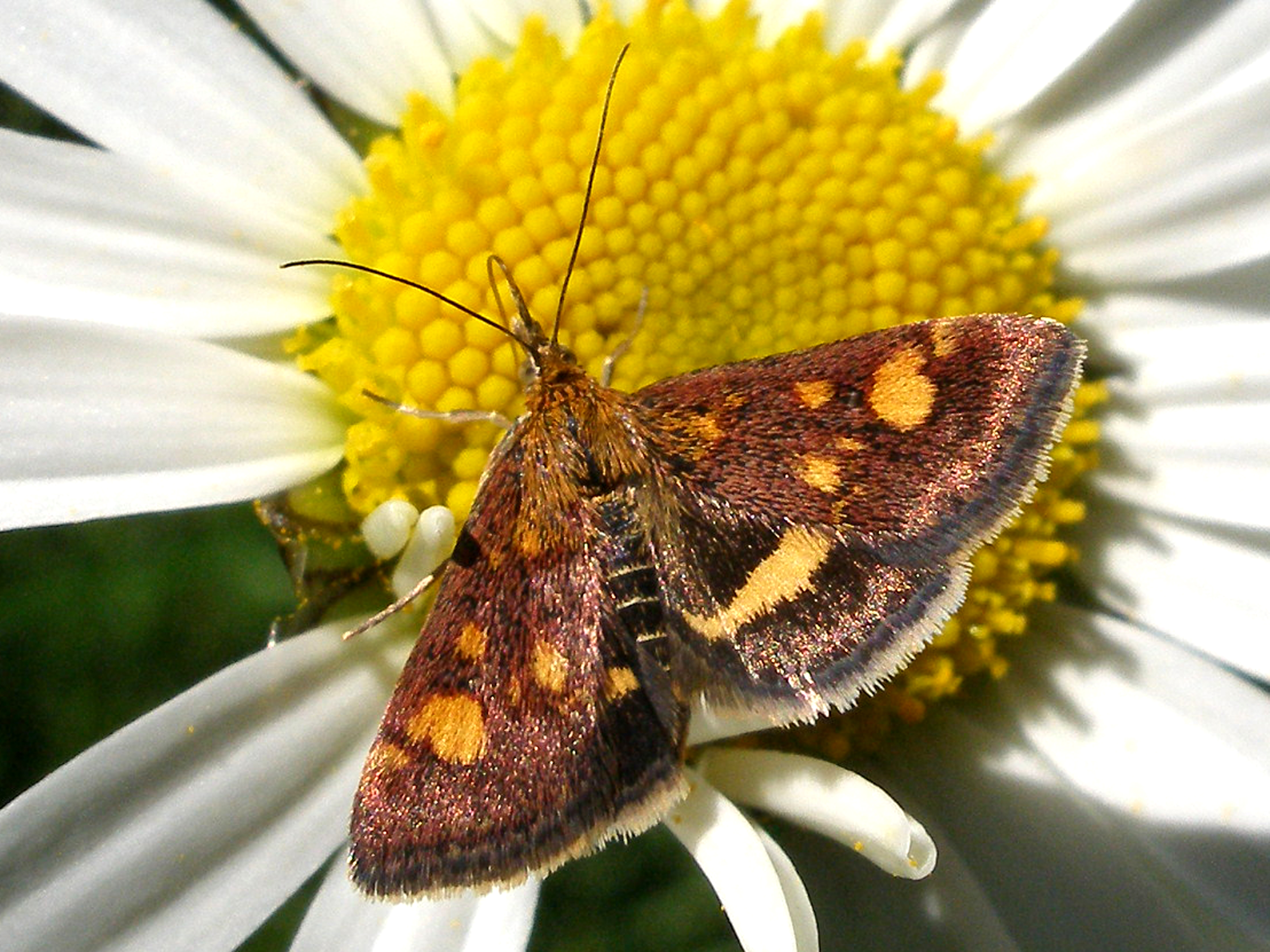
- Pyrausta falcatalis

Scientific classification
- Kingdom: Animalia
- Phylum: Arthropoda
- Class: Insecta
- Order: Lepidoptera
- Family: Crambidae
- Genus: Pyrausta
- Species: P. falcatalis

Binomial name
- Pyrausta falcatalis Guenee, 1854

Synonyms
- Pyrausta phoenicealis Fischer von Röslerstamm, 1834 (not Walker, 1859); Pyrausta falcatalis var. tauricalis Caradja, 1916

= Pyrausta falcatalis =

Species of moth

Pyrausta falcatalis is a species of moth in the family Crambidae. It is found in France, Germany, Austria, Switzerland, Italy, the Czech Republic, Poland, Slovenia, Hungary, Bosnia and Herzegovina, the Republic of Macedonia, Romania, Bulgaria, Moldova, Ukraine, Russia and Turkey. It has also been recorded from China.

The wingspan is 15–20 mm. Adults are on wing in June and August in one generation per year in western Europe.

The larvae have been recorded feeding on Salvia glutinosa.
