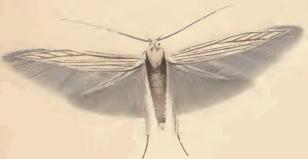

Scientific classification
- Kingdom: Animalia
- Phylum: Arthropoda
- Clade: Pancrustacea
- Class: Insecta
- Order: Lepidoptera
- Family: Coleophoridae
- Genus: Coleophora
- Species: C. virgatella

Binomial name
- Coleophora virgatella Zeller, 1849

= Coleophora virgatella =

Species of moth

Coleophora virgatella is a moth of the family Coleophoridae. It is found from Germany and Poland to the Pyrenees, Italy and Greece. It has also been recorded from southern Russia and central Asia.

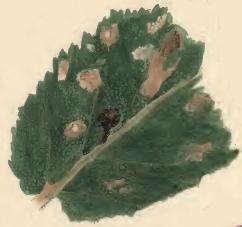
Mined leaf of Salvia pratensis with larva-case attached

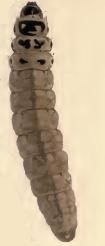
Larva

Larval case

Adults are on wing from late June to July.

The larvae feed on Salvia glutinosa, Salvia pratensis and Stachys species. Larvae can be found from autumn to May of the following year.
