= Orectoderus obliquus =

Scientific classification
- Kingdom: Animalia
- Phylum: Arthropoda
- Class: Insecta
- Order: Hemiptera
- Suborder: Heteroptera
- Family: Miridae
- Tribe: Cremnorrhinini
- Genus: Orectoderus
- Species: O. obliquus

Binomial name
- Orectoderus obliquus Uhler, 1876

Species of true bug

Orectoderus obliquus is a species of plant bug in the family Miridae. It is found in North America.

== Subspecies ==
These two subspecies belong to the species Orectoderus obliquus:

- Orectoderus obliquus ferrugineus Knight, 1923
- Orectoderus obliquus obliquus Uhler, 1876
