= M. quadrilineatus =

M. quadrilineatus may refer to:

- Macrosteles quadrilineatus, a leafhopper species in the family Cicadellidae
- Macrotylus quadrilineatus, a European plant bug species in the family Miridae
