= Teleorhinus cyaneus =

Scientific classification
- Kingdom: Animalia
- Phylum: Arthropoda
- Class: Insecta
- Order: Hemiptera
- Suborder: Heteroptera
- Family: Miridae
- Genus: Teleorhinus
- Species: T. cyaneus

Binomial name
- Teleorhinus cyaneus Uhler, 1890

Species of true bug

Teleorhinus cyaneus is a species of plant bug in the family Miridae. It is found in North America.
