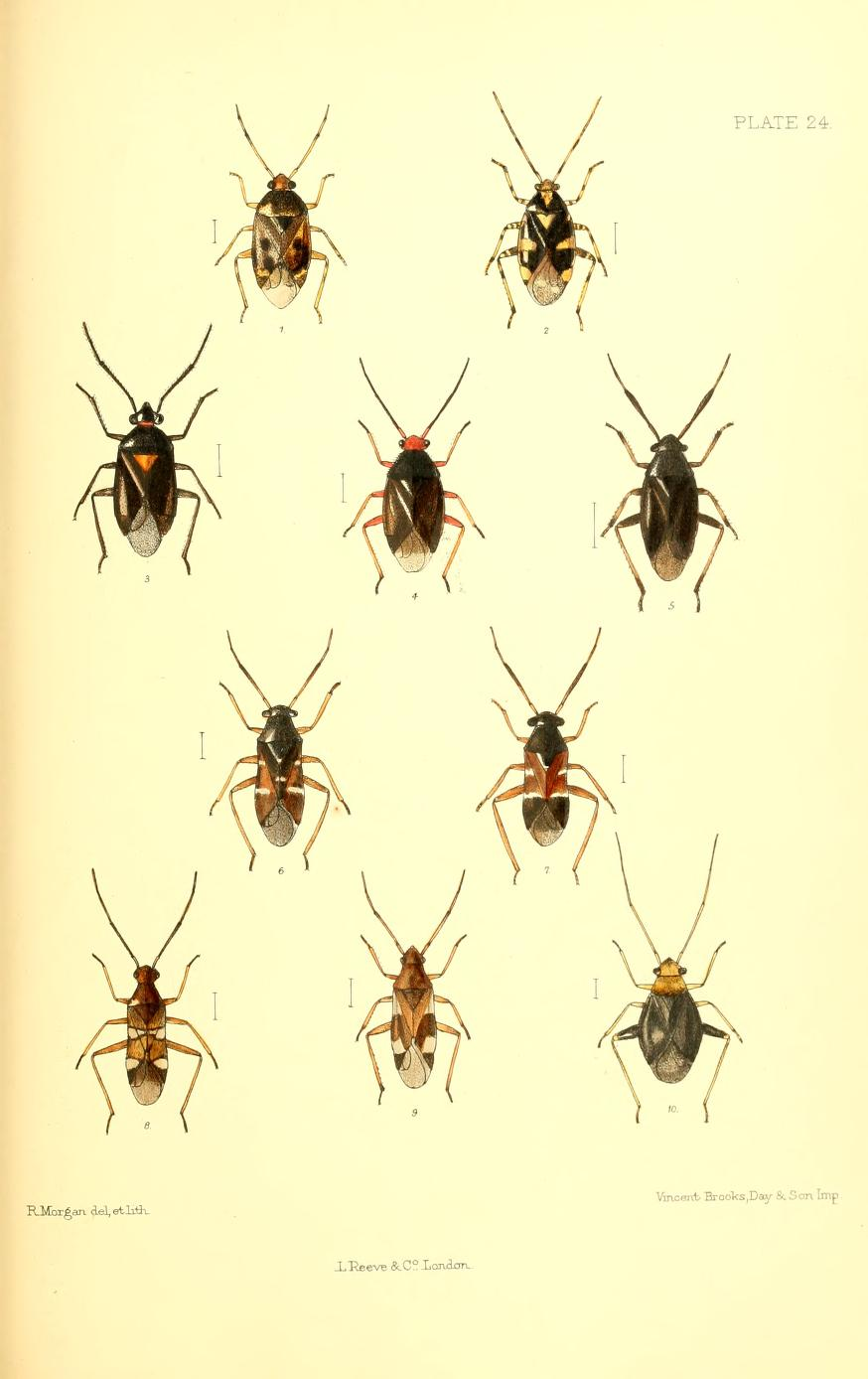
- Hallodapus rufescens depicted in Edward Saunders figure 9

Scientific classification
- Kingdom: Animalia
- Phylum: Arthropoda
- Clade: Pancrustacea
- Class: Insecta
- Order: Hemiptera
- Suborder: Heteroptera
- Family: Miridae
- Genus: Hallodapus
- Species: H. rufescens

Binomial name
- Hallodapus rufescens (Burmeister, 1835)

= Hallodapus rufescens =

Species of true bug

Hallodapus rufescens is a Palearctic species of true bug.
