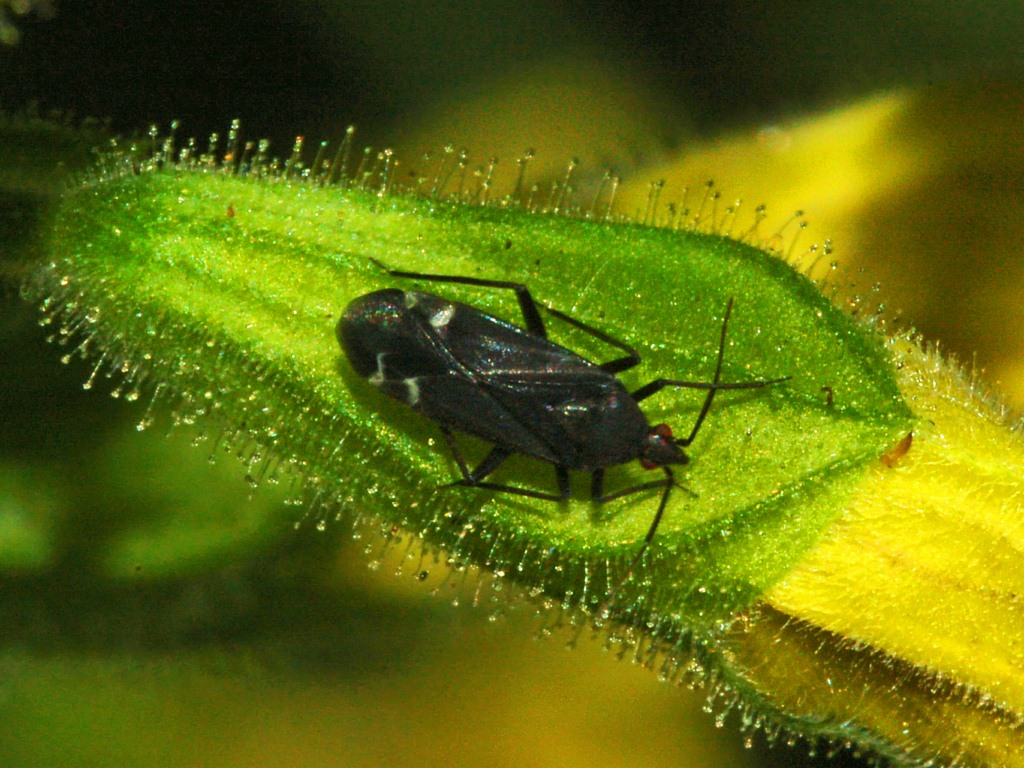
- Adult of Macrotylus quadrilineatus among the sticky hairs of Salvia glutinosa

Scientific classification
- Kingdom: Animalia
- Phylum: Arthropoda
- Class: Insecta
- Order: Hemiptera
- Suborder: Heteroptera
- Family: Miridae
- Tribe: Phylini
- Genus: Macrotylus; Fieber, 1858

= Macrotylus =

Genus of insects

Macrotylus is a genus of plant bugs in the family Miridae. There are at least 60 described species in Macrotylus.

== Species ==
These 69 species belong to the genus Macrotylus:

- Macrotylus amoenus Reuter, 1909
- Macrotylus anahtaris Seidenstucker, 1959
- Macrotylus ancoratus Seidenstucker, 1959
- Macrotylus ancyranus Seidenstucker, 1969
- Macrotylus antennalis Horvath, 1906
- Macrotylus atricapillus (J. Scott, 1872)
- Macrotylus attenuatus Jakovlev, 1882
- Macrotylus bernadettae Matocq, 1995
- Macrotylus bicolor (Fieber, 1861)
- Macrotylus bipunctatus Reuter, 1879
- Macrotylus brevirostris (Wagner, 1971)
- Macrotylus colon Reuter, 1880
- Macrotylus cruciatus (R. Sahlberg, 1848)
- Macrotylus dahukanus Linnavuori, 1988
- Macrotylus dentifer Wagner, 1969
- Macrotylus dimidiatus Jakovlev, 1889
- Macrotylus dorsalis Van Duzee, 1916
- Macrotylus ehannoi Matocq, 1996
- Macrotylus elevatus (Fieber, 1858)
- Macrotylus essigi Van Duzee, 1916
- Macrotylus fuentei Horvath, 1898
- Macrotylus galatinus Seidenstucker, 1968
- Macrotylus geminus Knight, 1925
- Macrotylus geniculatus Reuter, 1899
- Macrotylus gravesteini Wagner, 1966
- Macrotylus hamatus Seidenstucker, 1963
- Macrotylus hemizygiae Schuh, 1974
- Macrotylus herrichi (Reuter, 1873)
- Macrotylus horvathi (Reuter, 1876)
- Macrotylus hymenocratii V. Putshkov, 1974
- Macrotylus infuscatus Van Duzee, 1917
- Macrotylus intermedius Van Duzee, 1917
- Macrotylus jordii Streito, 2011
- Macrotylus josephinae Ribes, 1978
- Macrotylus lindbergi Wagner, 1953
- Macrotylus lineolatus Uhler, 1894
- Macrotylus longulus Poppius, 1912
- Macrotylus mactensis Wagner, 1968
- Macrotylus minor Wagner, 1975
- Macrotylus multipunctatus Van Duzee, 1916
- Macrotylus mundulus (Stal, 1858)
- Macrotylus nasutus Wagner, 1959
- Macrotylus niger Schuh, 1974
- Macrotylus nigricornis Fieber, 1864
- Macrotylus paykullii (Fallén, 1807)
- Macrotylus perdictus Kiritshenko, 1938
- Macrotylus phlomidis Rieger, 1984
- Macrotylus polymonii Knight, 1932
- Macrotylus ponticus Seidenstucker, 1967
- Macrotylus quadrilineatus (Schrank, 1785)
- Macrotylus regalis Uhler, 1890
- Macrotylus ribesi Carapezza, 1994
- Macrotylus salviae Uhler, 1890
- Macrotylus scutellaris Wagner, 1966
- Macrotylus seidenstueckeri Wagner, 1954
- Macrotylus sexguttatus (Provancher, 1887)
- Macrotylus shelabenae Schwartz and Scudder, 2003
- Macrotylus solitarius (Meyer-Dur, 1843)
- Macrotylus soosi Josifov, 1962
- Macrotylus spergulariae Lindberg, 1953
- Macrotylus subattenuatus Konstantinov, 2008
- Macrotylus suhaili Ghauri, 1978
- Macrotylus syriacus Wagner, 1963
- Macrotylus talhouki Wagner, 1976
- Macrotylus tamerus Wagner, 1975
- Macrotylus tristis Uhler, 1890
- Macrotylus vanduzeei Knight, 1932
- Macrotylus weberi Wagner, 1976
- Macrotylus zinovievi Kerzhner, 1984
