= Macrotylus vanduzeei =

Scientific classification
- Kingdom: Animalia
- Phylum: Arthropoda
- Class: Insecta
- Order: Hemiptera
- Suborder: Heteroptera
- Family: Miridae
- Genus: Macrotylus
- Species: M. vanduzeei

Binomial name
- Macrotylus vanduzeei Knight, 1932

Species of true bug

Macrotylus vanduzeei is a species of plant bug in the family Miridae. It is found in North America.
