= Pronotocrepis =

Scientific classification
- Kingdom: Animalia
- Phylum: Arthropoda
- Clade: Pancrustacea
- Class: Insecta
- Order: Hemiptera
- Suborder: Heteroptera
- Family: Miridae
- Subfamily: Phylinae
- Tribe: Cremnorrhinini
- Genus: Pronotocrepis; Knight, 1929

Genus of true bugs

Pronotocrepis is a genus of plant bugs in the family Miridae. There are at least three described species in Pronotocrepis.

== Species ==
These three species belong to the genus Pronotocrepis:

- Pronotocrepis clavicornis Knight, 1929
- Pronotocrepis ribesi Knight, 1969
- Pronotocrepis rubra Knight, 1969
