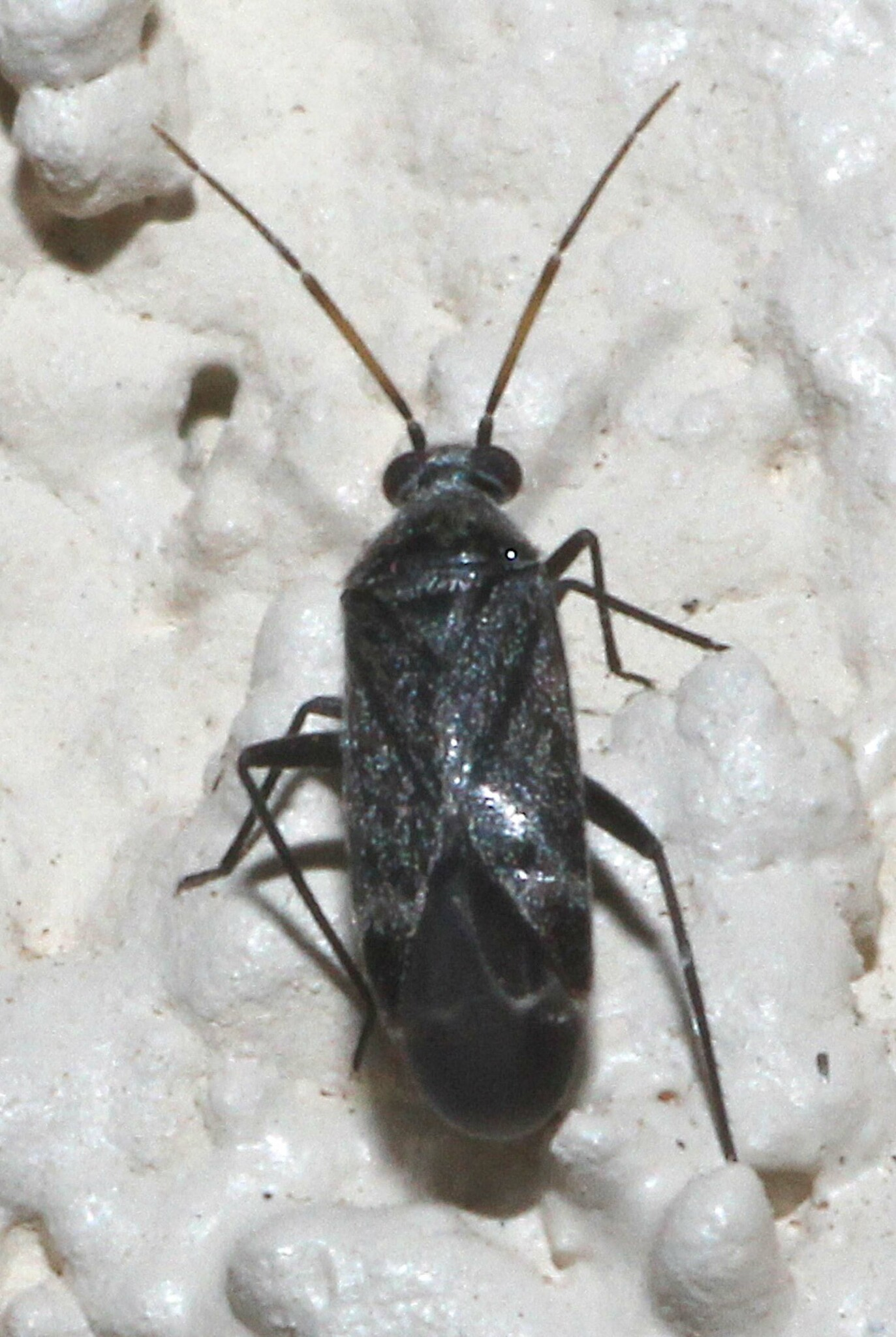

Scientific classification
- Kingdom: Animalia
- Phylum: Arthropoda
- Clade: Pancrustacea
- Class: Insecta
- Order: Hemiptera
- Suborder: Heteroptera
- Family: Miridae
- Tribe: Cremnorrhinini
- Genus: Guentherocoris; Schuh & Schwartz, 2004
- Species: G. atritibialis

Binomial name
- Guentherocoris atritibialis (Knight, 1930)

= Guentherocoris =

Genus of true bugs

Guentherocoris is a genus of plant bugs in the family Miridae. There is one described species in Guentherocoris, G. atritibialis.
