= Cyrtopeltocoris =

- Cyrtopeltocoris gracilentis

Scientific classification
- Kingdom: Animalia
- Phylum: Arthropoda
- Clade: Pancrustacea
- Class: Insecta
- Order: Hemiptera
- Suborder: Heteroptera
- Family: Miridae
- Subfamily: Phylinae
- Tribe: Hallodapini
- Genus: Cyrtopeltocoris; Reuter, 1876

Genus of true bugs

Cyrtopeltocoris is a genus of plant bugs in the family Miridae. There are about 11 described species in the genus Cyrtopeltocoris.

== Species ==
These 11 species belong to the genus Cyrtopeltocoris:

- Cyrtopeltocoris ajo Knight, 1968
- Cyrtopeltocoris albofasciatus Reuter, 1876
- Cyrtopeltocoris arizonae Knight, 1968
- Cyrtopeltocoris balli Knight, 1968
- Cyrtopeltocoris barberi Knight, 1968
- Cyrtopeltocoris conicatus Knight, 1968
- Cyrtopeltocoris cubanus Poppius, 1914
- Cyrtopeltocoris gracilentis Knight, 1930
- Cyrtopeltocoris huachucae Knight, 1968
- Cyrtopeltocoris illini Knight, 1941
- Cyrtopeltocoris oklahomae Knight, 1968
