= Macrotylus amoenus =

Scientific classification
- Kingdom: Animalia
- Phylum: Arthropoda
- Class: Insecta
- Order: Hemiptera
- Suborder: Heteroptera
- Family: Miridae
- Tribe: Phylini
- Genus: Macrotylus
- Species: M. amoenus

Binomial name
- Macrotylus amoenus Reuter, 1909

Species of true bug

Macrotylus amoenus is a species of plant bug in the family Miridae. It is found in North America.
