= Coquillettia =

Scientific classification
- Kingdom: Animalia
- Phylum: Arthropoda
- Clade: Pancrustacea
- Class: Insecta
- Order: Hemiptera
- Suborder: Heteroptera
- Family: Miridae
- Subfamily: Phylinae
- Tribe: Cremnorrhinini
- Genus: Coquillettia; Uhler, 1890

Genus of true bugs

Coquillettia is a genus of plant bugs in the family Miridae. There are more than 30 described species in Coquillettia.

== Species ==
These 39 species belong to the genus Coquillettia:

- Coquillettia ajo Knight, 1968
- Coquillettia albella Knight, 1968
- Coquillettia albertae Kelton, 1980
- Coquillettia albiclava Knight, 1925
- Coquillettia alpina Polhemus & Polhemus, 1988
- Coquillettia amoena (Uhler, 1877)
- Coquillettia amoenus (Uhler, 1877)
- Coquillettia aquila Bliven, 1962
- Coquillettia attica Bliven, 1962
- Coquillettia balli Knight, 1918
- Coquillettia concava Wyniger, 2012
- Coquillettia foxi Van Duzee, 1921
- Coquillettia gigantea Wyniger, 2012
- Coquillettia granulata Knight, 1930
- Coquillettia impluviata Wyniger, 2012
- Coquillettia insignis Uhler, 1890
- Coquillettia jessiana Knight, 1927
- Coquillettia lactea Wyniger, 2012
- Coquillettia laticeps Knight, 1927
- Coquillettia luteiclava Knight, 1968
- Coquillettia mimetica Osborn, 1898
- Coquillettia nicholi Knight, 1925
- Coquillettia nigrithorax Knight, 1930
- Coquillettia numata Bliven, 1962
- Coquillettia obscura Wyniger, 2012
- Coquillettia pergrandis Wyniger, 2012
- Coquillettia perplexabilis Wyniger, 2012
- Coquillettia polhemorum Wyniger, 2012
- Coquillettia pseudoattica Wyniger, 2012
- Coquillettia saxetana Bliven, 1962
- Coquillettia schuhi Wyniger, 2012
- Coquillettia schwartzi Wyniger, 2012
- Coquillettia soligena Bliven, 1962
- Coquillettia terrosa Bliven, 1962
- Coquillettia thomasi Wyniger, 2012
- Coquillettia uhleri Van Duzee, 1921
- Coquillettia venusta Wyniger, 2012
- Coquillettia vicina Wyniger, 2012
- Coquillettia virescens Knight, 1968
