= Orectoderus =

Scientific classification
- Kingdom: Animalia
- Phylum: Arthropoda
- Clade: Pancrustacea
- Class: Insecta
- Order: Hemiptera
- Suborder: Heteroptera
- Family: Miridae
- Subfamily: Phylinae
- Tribe: Cremnorrhinini
- Genus: Orectoderus; Uhler, 1876

Genus of true bugs

Orectoderus is a genus of plant bugs in the family Miridae. There are about 10 described species in Orectoderus.

== Species ==
These 10 species belong to the genus Orectoderus:

- Orectoderus arcuatus Knight, 1927
- Orectoderus bakeri Knight, 1968
- Orectoderus cockerelli Knight, 1968
- Orectoderus longicollis Uhler, 1895
- Orectoderus montanus Knight, 1968
- Orectoderus obliquus Uhler, 1876
- Orectoderus ruckesi Knight, 1968
- Orectoderus salicis Knight, 1968
- Orectoderus schuhi Knight, 1964
- Orectoderus utahensis Knight, 1968
