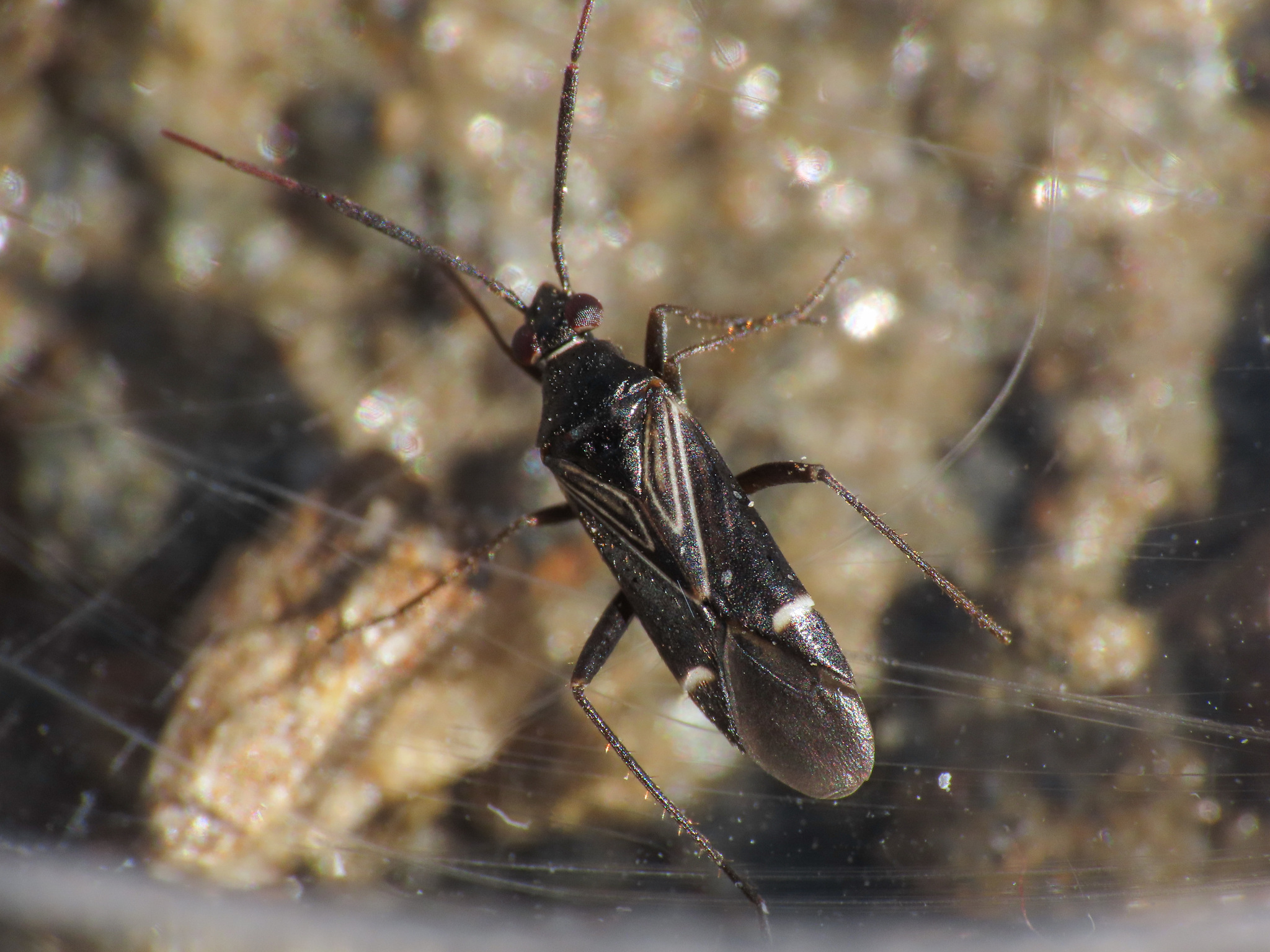
- Cremnocephalus alpestris, Italy

Scientific classification
- Kingdom: Animalia
- Phylum: Arthropoda
- Class: Insecta
- Order: Hemiptera
- Suborder: Heteroptera
- Family: Miridae
- Subfamily: Phylinae
- Tribe: Hallodapini; Van Duzee, 1916

= Hallodapini =

Tribe of true bugs

Hallodapini is a tribe of plant bugs in the family Miridae. There are more than 50 genera in Hallodapini.

Most species of this tribe are found in the Old World, including Australia. Only one genus, Cyrtopeltocoris, is found in North America.

== Genera ==
These 56 genera belong to the tribe Hallodapini:

Acrorrhinium Noualhier, 1895 - Europe, Asia, Australia
Aeolocoris Reuter, 1903 - Africa
Alloeomimus Reuter, 1910 - Paleotropical
Artchawakomius Yasunaga, 2012 - Orient
Aspidacanthus Reuter, 1901 - Africa, southern Palearctic
Auricillocoris Schuh, 1984 - Orient
Azizus Distant, 1910 - Indomalaya, Pacific islands
Bibundiella Poppius, 1914 - Africa
Boopidella Reuter, 1907 - Africa
Carinogulus Schuh, 1974 - Africa
Chaetocapsus Poppius, 1914 - Africa
Clapmarius Distant, 1904 - Orient
Cleotomiris Schuh, 1984 - Orient
Cleotomiroides Schuh, 1984 - Orient
Cremnocephalus Eieber, 1860 - Western Palearctic
Cyrtopeltocoris Reuter, 1876 - North America
Diocoris Kirkaldy, 1902 - Africa
Eminoculus Schuh, 1974 - Africa
Formicopsella Poppius, 1914 - Africa
Gampsodema Odhiambo, 1960 - Africa
Glaphyrocoris Reuter, 1903 - Southern Palearctic, Africa
Hadrodapus Linnavuori, 1996 - Africa
Hallodapomimus Herczek, 2000 - Baltic amber
Hallodapus Eieber, 1858 - Palearctic, Africa, Australia
Ifephylus Linnavuori, 1993 - Africa
Kapoetius Schmitz, 1969 - Palearctic, Africa
Laemocoris Reuter, 1879 - Africa, southern Palearctic
Leaina Linnavuori, 1974 - west Africa
Leptomimus Herczek & Popov, 2010 - Baltic amber
Lestonisca Carvalho, 1988 - Africa
Linacoris Carvalho, 1983 - Oceania
Lissocapsus Bergroth, 1903 - Africa, Madagascar
Malgacheocoris Carvalho, 1952 - Africa, Madagascar
Mimocoris J. Scott, 1872 - Europe
Myombea China & Carvalho, 1951 - Africa
Myrmicomimus Reuter, 1881 - southern Palearctic
Neolaemocoris Wagner, 1975 - Palearctic, North Africa
Omphalonotus Reuter, 1876 - southern Palearctic
Pangania Poppius, 1914 - Africa
Paralaemocoris Linnavuori, 1964 - southern Palearctic
Phoradendrepulus Polhemus & Polhemus, 1985 - southwest Nearctic
Podullahas Schuh, 1984 - Orient
Pongocoris Linnavuori, 1975 - Africa
Ribautocapsus Wagner, 1962 - Palearctic
Ruwaba Linnavuori, 1975 - Southern Palearctic
Skukuza Schuh, 1974 - Africa
Sohenus Distant, 1910 - India, Sri Lanka
Syngonus Bergroth, 1926 - Africa
Systellonotidea Poppius, 1914 - Africa
Systellonotopsis Poppius, 1914 - Africa
Systellonotus Pieber, 1858 - Palearctic
Trichophorella Reuter, 1905 - Africa
Trichophthalmocapsus Poppius, 1914
Vitsikamiris Polhemus, 1994 - Africa, Madagascar
Wygomiris Schuh, 1984 eastern Asia, Indo-Pacific
Zaratus Distant, 1909 - India, Thailand
