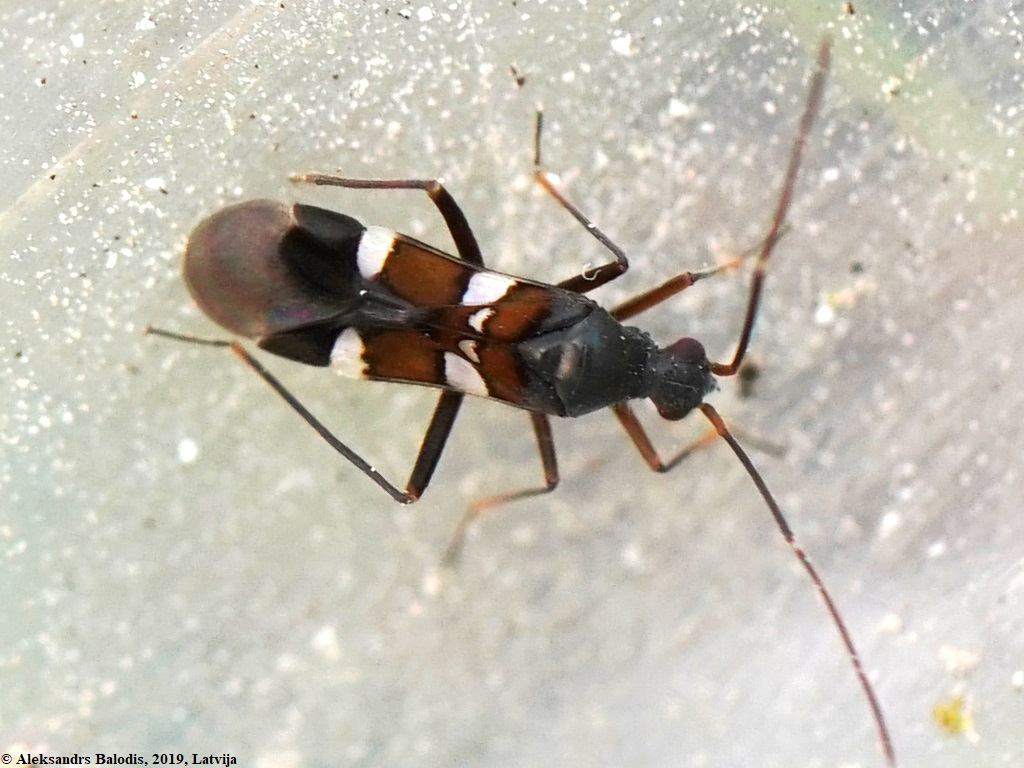
- Systellonotus triguttatus

Scientific classification
- Kingdom: Animalia
- Phylum: Arthropoda
- Class: Insecta
- Order: Hemiptera
- Suborder: Heteroptera
- Family: Miridae
- Genus: Systellonotus; Fieber, 1858

= Systellonotus =

Genus of true bugs

Systellonotus is a genus of true bugs belonging to the family Miridae.

The species of this genus are found in Eurasia.

== Species ==
Sources:

- Systellonotus albofasciatus (Lucas, 1849)
- Systellonotus alpinus (Frey-Gessner, 1871)
- Systellonotus brincki (Schuh, 1974)
- Systellonotus championi (Reuter, 1903)
- Systellonotus discoidalis (Horvath, 1894)
- Systellonotus insularis (Wagner, 1948)
- Systellonotus jirhandehanus (Linnavuori and Hosseini, 1998)
- Systellonotus lesbia (Linnavuori, 1972)
- Systellonotus malaisei (Lindberg, 1934)
- Systellonotus micelii (Ferrari, 1884)
- Systellonotus palpator (Kirkaldy, 1902)
- Systellonotus pseuovelox (Carapezza, 1998)
- Systellonotus stysi (Ribes, Pagola-Carte, and Heiss, 2008)
- Systellonotus tamaninii (Rizzotti Vlach, 1998)
- Systellonotus thymi (V. Signoret, 1859)
- Systellonotus triguttatus (Linnaeus, 1767)
- Systellonotus usaifirae (Linnavuori, 1972)
- Systellonotus velox (Horvath, 1907)
- Systellonotus villiersi (Ribaut, 1941)
- Systellonotus wagneri (Linnavuori, 1964)
- Systellonotus weberi (Wagner, 1955)
