= Teleorhinus (bug) =

Scientific classification
- Kingdom: Animalia
- Phylum: Arthropoda
- Class: Insecta
- Order: Hemiptera
- Suborder: Heteroptera
- Family: Miridae
- Tribe: Hallodapini
- Genus: Teleorhinus; Uhler, 1890

Genus of true bugs

Teleorhinus is a genus of plant bugs in the family Miridae. There are about eight described species in Teleorhinus.

== Species ==
These eight species belong to the genus Teleorhinus:

- Teleorhinus brindleyi Knight, 1968^{i}
- Teleorhinus crataegi Wyniger, 2010^{c g}
- Teleorhinus cyaneus Uhler, 1890^{i c g b}
- Teleorhinus floridanus Blatchley, 1926^{i g}
- Teleorhinus nigricornis Knight, 1968^{i}
- Teleorhinus oregoni Knight, 1968^{i}
- Teleorhinus tephrosicola Knight, 1923^{i c g b}
- Teleorhinus utahensis Knight, 1968^{i}

Data sources: i = ITIS, c = Catalogue of Life, g = GBIF, b = Bugguide.net
