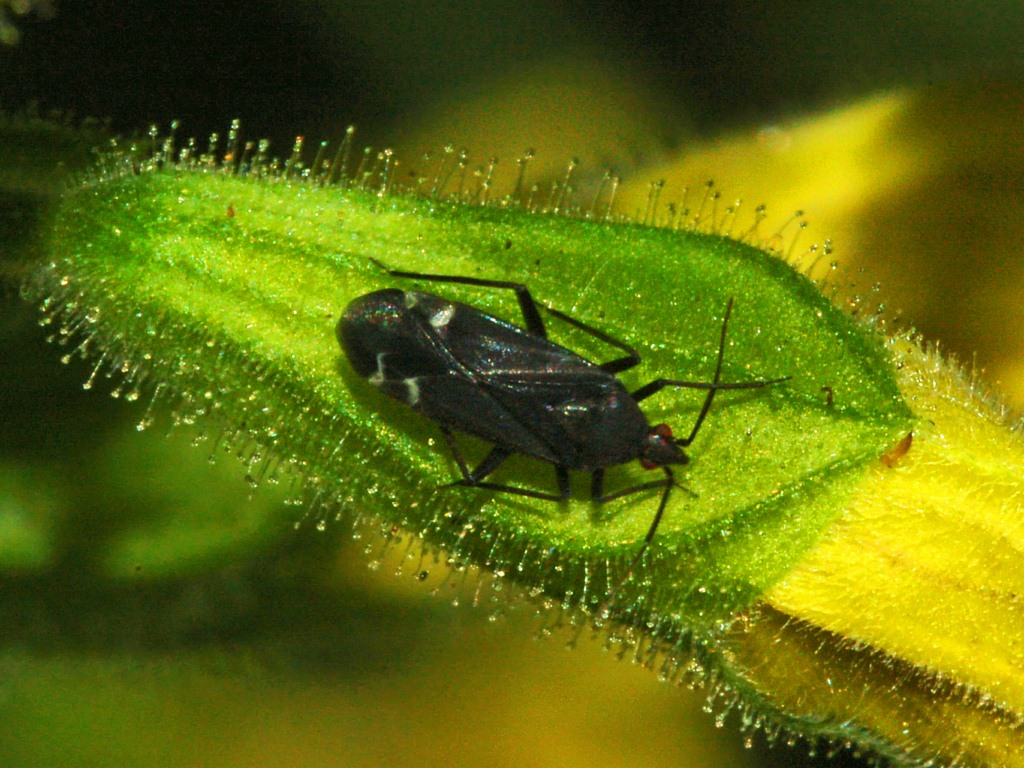
- Adult of Macrotylus quadrilineatus among sticky hairs of Salvia glutinosa

Scientific classification
- Kingdom: Animalia
- Phylum: Arthropoda
- Class: Insecta
- Order: Hemiptera
- Suborder: Heteroptera
- Family: Miridae
- Genus: Macrotylus
- Species: M. quadrilineatus

Binomial name
- Macrotylus quadrilineatus (Schrank, 1785)

= Macrotylus quadrilineatus =

Species of true bug

Macrotylus quadrilineatus is a species of plant bug belonging to the family Miridae, subfamily Phylinae.

== Ecology ==
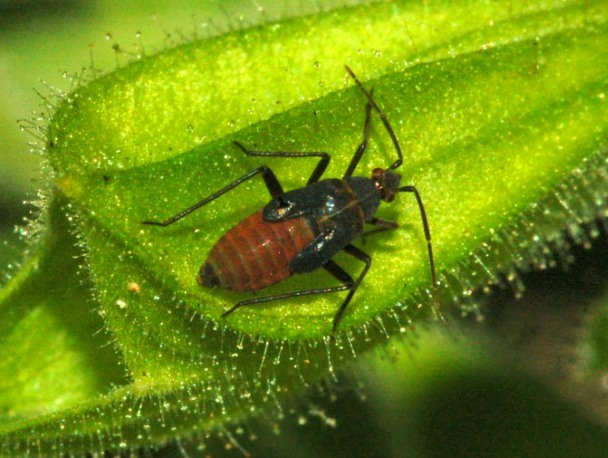
Nymph

The main host plant is Jupiter's Distaff (Salvia glutinosa, Lamiaceae). This plant bug feeds on the juices of the plant and on small insects entrapped on the sticky salvia.

== Distribution ==
It is mainly found in Austria, Italy, Germany, France, Romania, Switzerland, Slovenia, Poland and former Yugoslavia.

== Description ==
Macrotylus quadrilineatus can reach a length of about 5 millimetres (0.20 in). The body and legs color is black, with four white lines (hence the species name).
