= Hallodapus =

Scientific classification
- Kingdom: Animalia
- Phylum: Arthropoda
- Class: Insecta
- Order: Hemiptera
- Suborder: Heteroptera
- Family: Miridae
- Genus: Hallodapus; Fieber, 1858

Genus of true bugs

Hallodapus is a genus of true bugs belonging to the family Miridae.

The species of this genus are found in Europe, Africa, Japan, Australia.

Species:

- Hallodapus albofasciatus (Motschulsky, 1863)
- Hallodapus basilewskyi (Carvalho, 1951)
- Hallodapus rufescens
