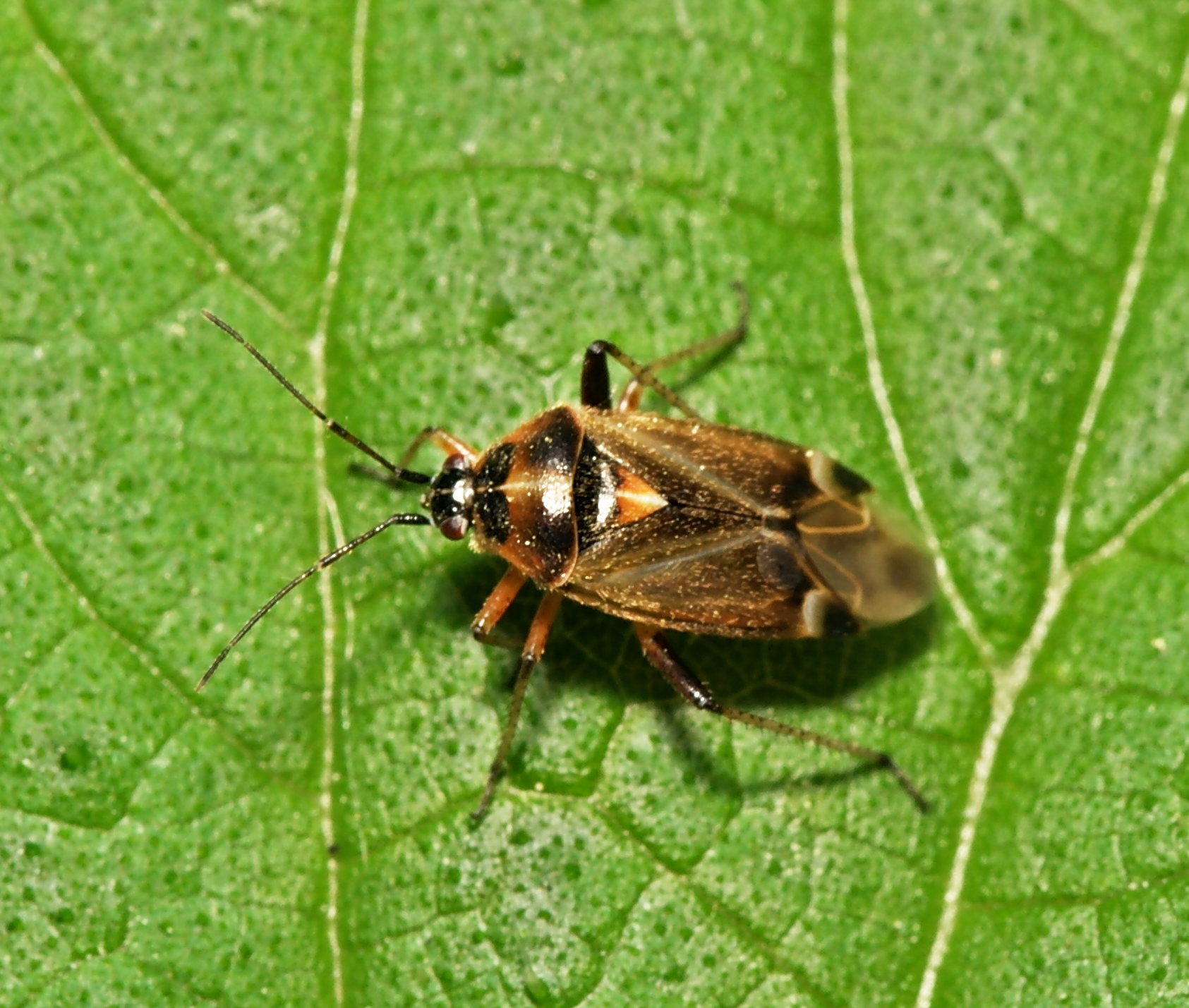
- Harpocera thoracica, Germany

Scientific classification
- Kingdom: Animalia
- Phylum: Arthropoda
- Class: Insecta
- Order: Hemiptera
- Suborder: Heteroptera
- Family: Miridae
- Subfamily: Phylinae
- Tribe: Cremnorrhinini; Reuter, 1883

Subtribes
- Coatonocapsina Schuh & Menard, 2013; Cremnorrhinina Reuter, 1883

= Cremnorrhinini =

Tribe of true bugs

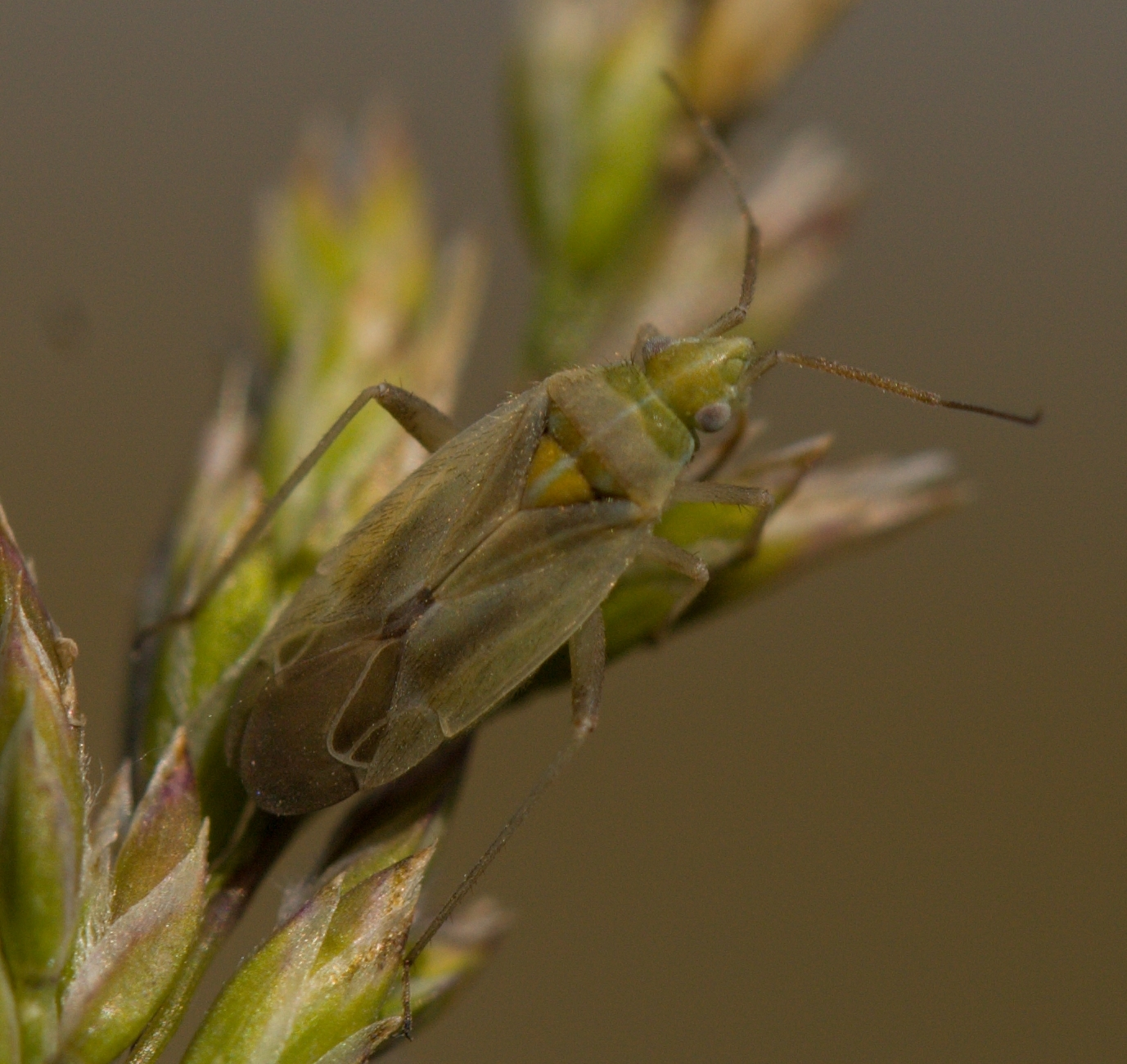
Amblytylus nasutus

Cremnorrhinini is a tribe of plant bugs in the family Miridae. There are about 50 genera in Cremnorrhinini, all but five in the subtribe Cremnorrhinina.

== Genera ==
These 50 genera belong to the tribe Cremnorrhinini:

Tribe Cremnorrhinini Reuter, 1883

- Genus Adunatiphylus Schuh & Schwartz, 2016 - Australia
- Genus Amblytylus Fieber, 1858 - Palearctic
- Genus Asterophylus Schuh & Schwartz, 2016 - Australia
- Genus Austroplagiognathus Schuh & Schwartz, 2016 - Australia
- Genus Austropsallus Schuh, 1974 - Africa
- Genus Bifidostylus Schuh & Schwartz, 2016 - Australia
- Genus Brachyceratocoris Knight, 1968 - Southwest Nearctic
- Genus Calidroides Schwartz, 2005 - Southwest Nearctic
- Genus Capecapsus Schuh, 1974 - Africa
- Genus Coatonocapsus Schuh, 1974 - Africa
- Genus Coquillettia Uhler, 1890 - Western Nearctic
- Genus Cremnorrhinus Reuter, 1880 - Palearctic
- Genus Dacota Uhler, 1872 - Holarctic
- Genus Denticulophallus Schuh, 1974 - Africa
- Genus Dicyphylus Schuh & Schwartz, 2016 - Australia
- Genus Eremotylus Schuh & Schwartz, 2016 - Australia
- Genus Ethelastia Reuter, 1876 - Palearctic
- Genus Euderon Puton, 1888 - Palearctic
- Genus Excentricoris Carvalho, 1955 - Palearctic
- Genus Grandivesica Schuh & Schwartz, 2016 - Australia
- Genus Guentherocoris Schuh & Schwartz, 2004 - Southwest Nearctic
- Genus Gyrophallus Schuh & Schwartz, 2016 - Australia
- Genus Halophylus Schuh & Schwartz, 2016 - Australia
- Genus Harpocera Curtis, 1838 - Palearctic
- Genus Heterocapillus Wagner, 1960 - Palearctic
- Genus Lepidophylus Schuh & Schwartz, 2016 - Australia
- Genus Leutiola Wyniger, 2012 - Western Nearctic
- Genus Lopidodenus V. Putshkov, 1974 - Palearctic
- Genus Lopus Hahn, 1833 - Western Palearctic
- Genus Macrotylus Fieber, 1858 - Holarctic, South Africa
- Genus Maculiphylus Schuh & Schwartz, 2016 - Australia
- Genus Monospiniphallus Schuh & Schwartz, 2016 - Australia
- Genus Myoporophylus Schuh & Schwartz, 2016 - Australia
- Genus Myrtophylus Schuh & Schwartz, 2016 - Australia
- Genus Omnivoriphylus Schuh & Schwartz, 2016 - Australia
- Genus Orectoderus Uhler, 1876 - Western Nearctic
- Genus Pachyxyphus Fieber, 1858 - Western Palearctic
- Genus Paralopus Wagner, 1957 - Palearctic
- Genus Parasciodema Poppius, 1914 - Africa
- Genus Pronotocrepis Knight, 1929 - Western Nearctic
- Genus Proteophylus Schuh & Schwartz, 2016 - Australia
- Genus Pulvillophylus Schuh & Schwartz, 2016 - Australia
- Genus Shendina Linnavuori, 1975 - Nearctic
- Genus Spinivesica Schuh & Schwartz, 2016 - Australia
- Genus Strophopoda Van Duzee, 1916 - Western Nearctic
- Genus Teleorhinus Uhler, 1890 - Western Nearctic
- Genus Telophylus Schuh & Schwartz, 2016 - Australia
- Genus Ticua Wyniger, 2012 - Western Nearctic
- Genus Utopnia Reuter, 1881 - Palearctic
- Genus Zinjolopus Linnavuori, 1975 - Palearctic
