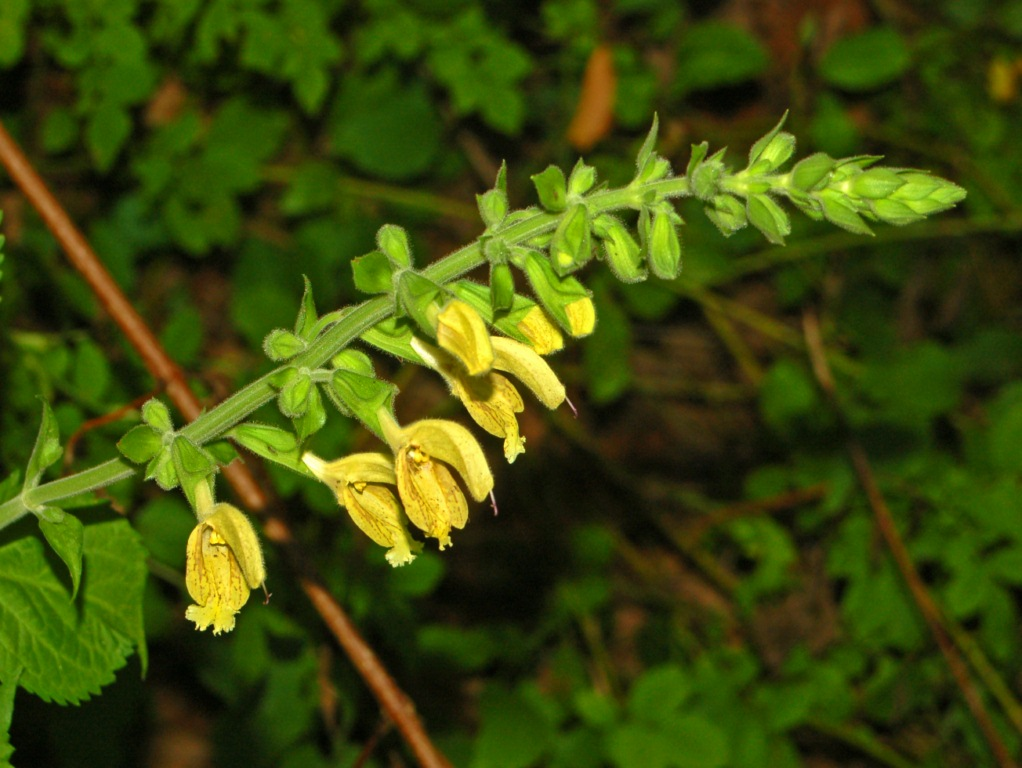
- Inflorescence of Salvia glutinosa

Scientific classification
- Kingdom: Plantae
- Clade: Tracheophytes
- Clade: Angiosperms
- Clade: Eudicots
- Clade: Asterids
- Order: Lamiales
- Family: Lamiaceae
- Genus: Salvia
- Species: S. glutinosa

Binomial name
- Salvia glutinosa L.

= Salvia glutinosa =

Species of flowering plant

Salvia glutinosa, the glutinous sage, sticky sage, Jupiter's sage, or Jupiter's distaff, is a herbaceous perennial plant belonging to the family Lamiaceae.

== Description ==
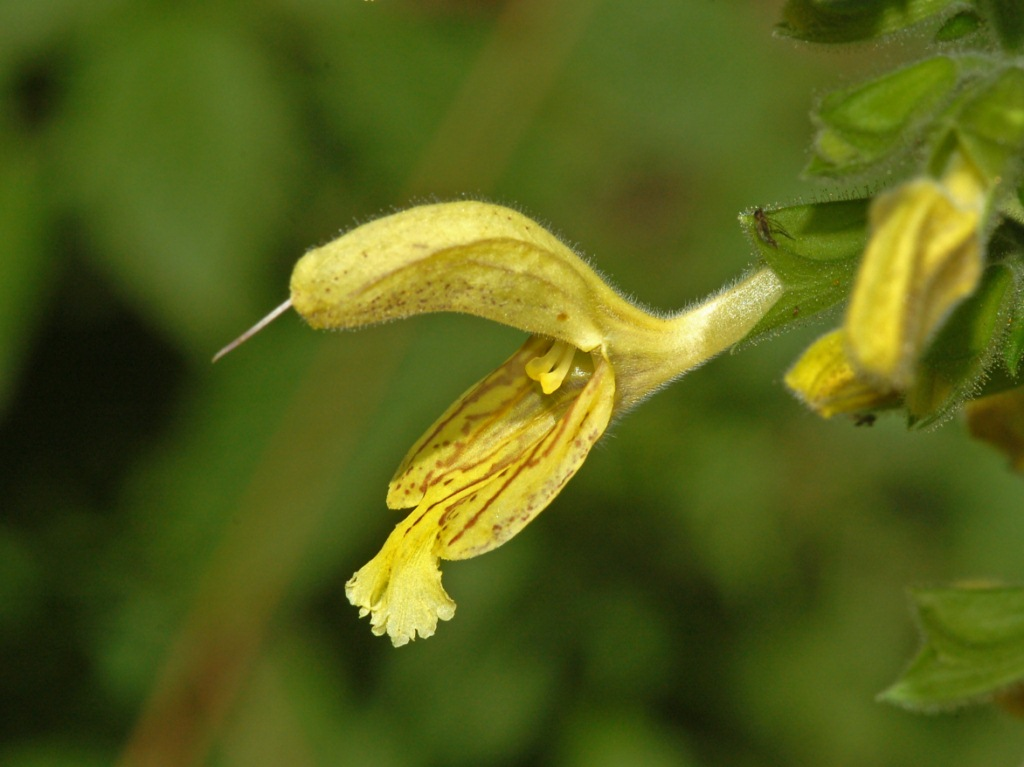
Close-up of Salvia glutinosa flower

Salvia glutinosa grows to approximately 40–60 centimetres (16–24 in) tall. The stems are erect, with bright green hairy leaves that are about 13 cm (5.1 in) long, with petioles of about 8–10 centimetres (3.1–3.9 in). The leaves are deciduous, toothed, pointed, tomentose and glandular. With the first frosts, foliage disappears and the plant is ready to overwinter in dormant buds.

All parts of the plant are covered with sticky glandular hairs, especially the lime-green calyces and the flowers, resulting in the name "glutinosa". These sticky hairs probably have a protective function against predators. Salvia glutinosa is the main host plant of the plant bug Macrotylus quadrilineatus, that feeds on the juices of the plant and on small insects entrapped on this sticky sage.

Flowers grow in whorls of two to six, with pale yellow flowers speckled with maroon. The flowers are supported by tiny persistent bracts and have a length of 3–5 centimetres (1.2–2.0 in), which is quite big for a sage. The flowers have two stamens and a bell-shaped calyx. The flowering period extends from June to September.

This species has been reported to contain salvinorin A. However, this report has not been replicated, and a previous study of 441 Salvia species from many regions found salvinorin A only in Salvia divinorum, from Mexico.

== Distribution ==
This plant is native to Central and East Europe, and West Asia. It is grown in gardens.

== Habitat ==
Salvia glutinosa is found in forested areas in deciduous and mixed woods especially in the shade and partial shade and in calcareous soils, at an altitude of 100–1,600 metres (330–5,250 ft) above sea level.

== Gallery ==
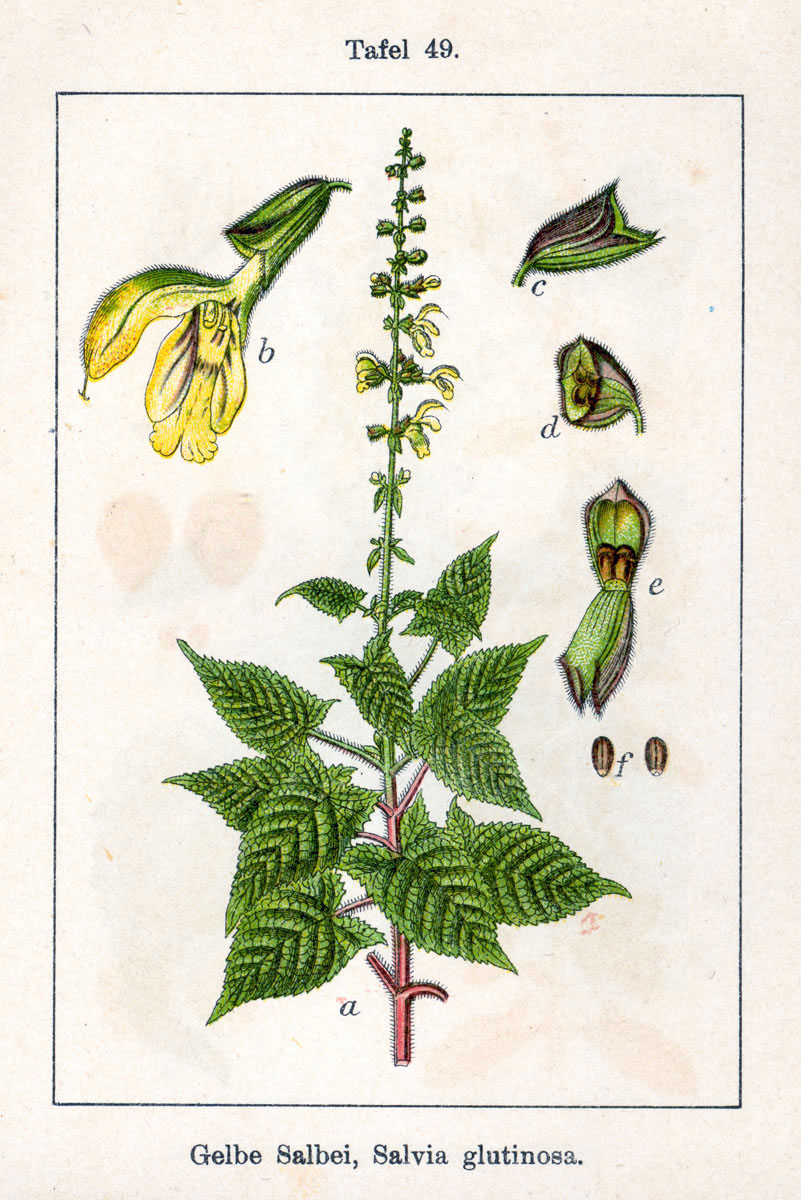
Figure of Salvia glutinosa from Deutschlands Flora in Abbildungen, 1796

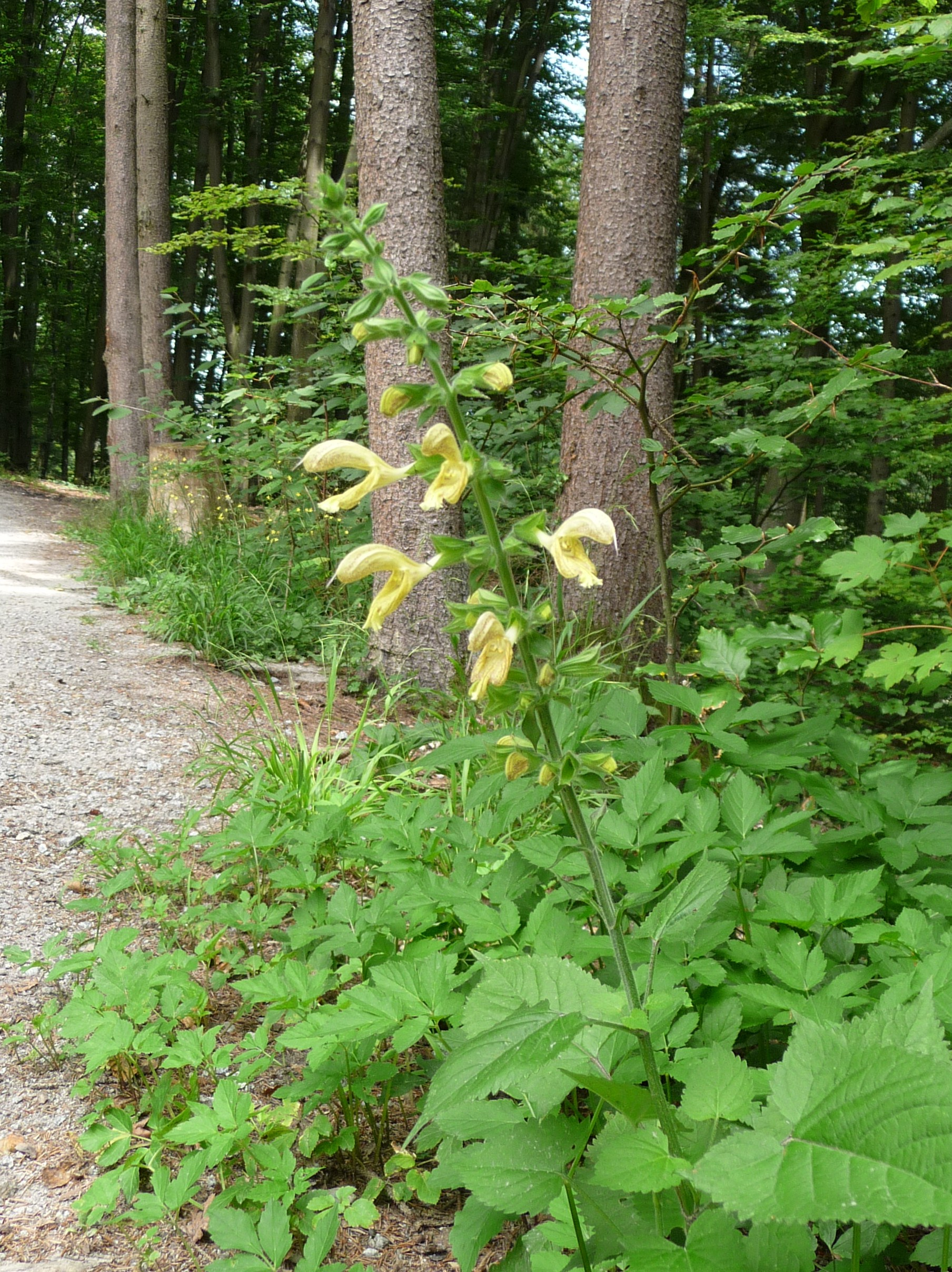
Plant of Salvia glutinosa

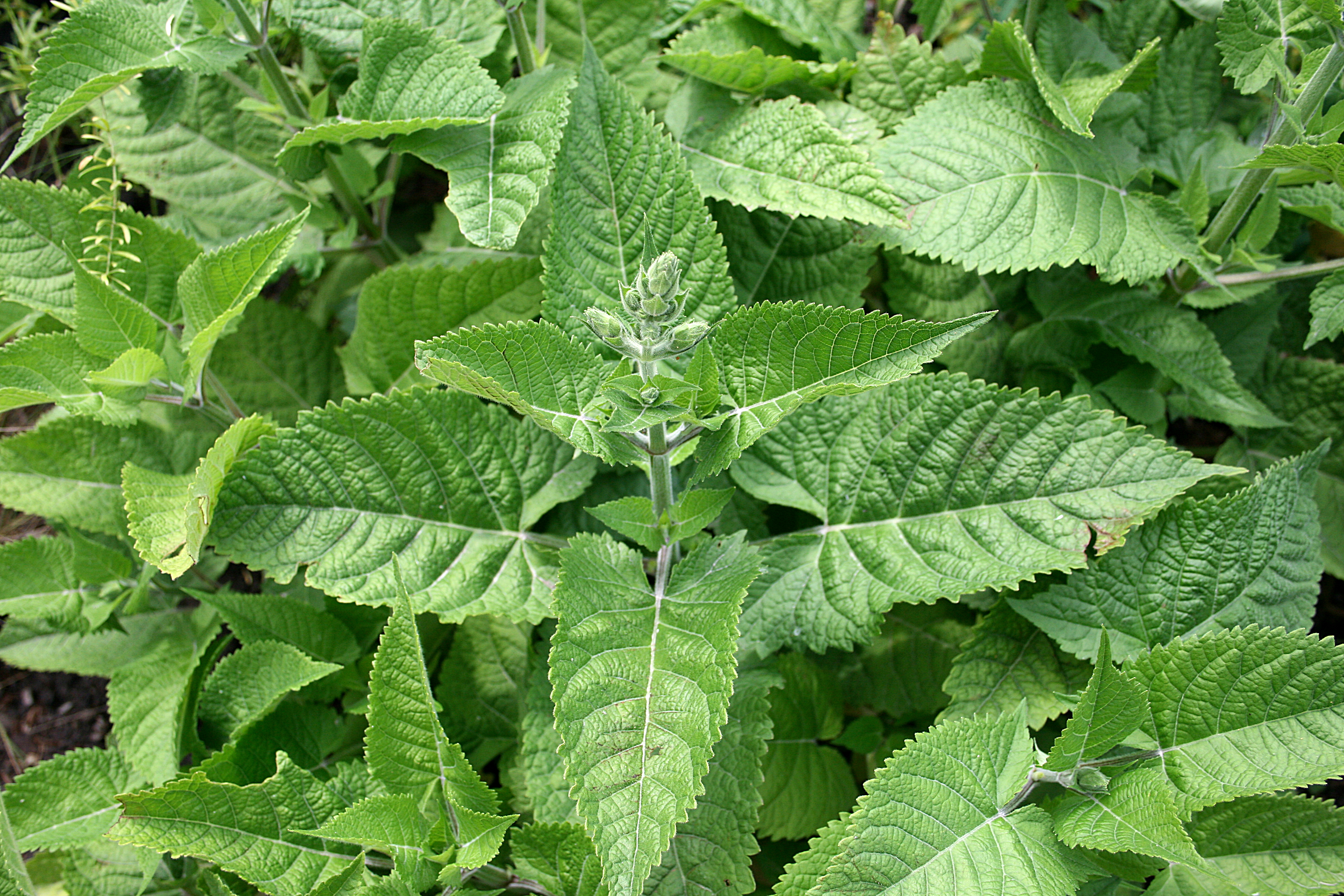
Leaf of Salvia glutinosa

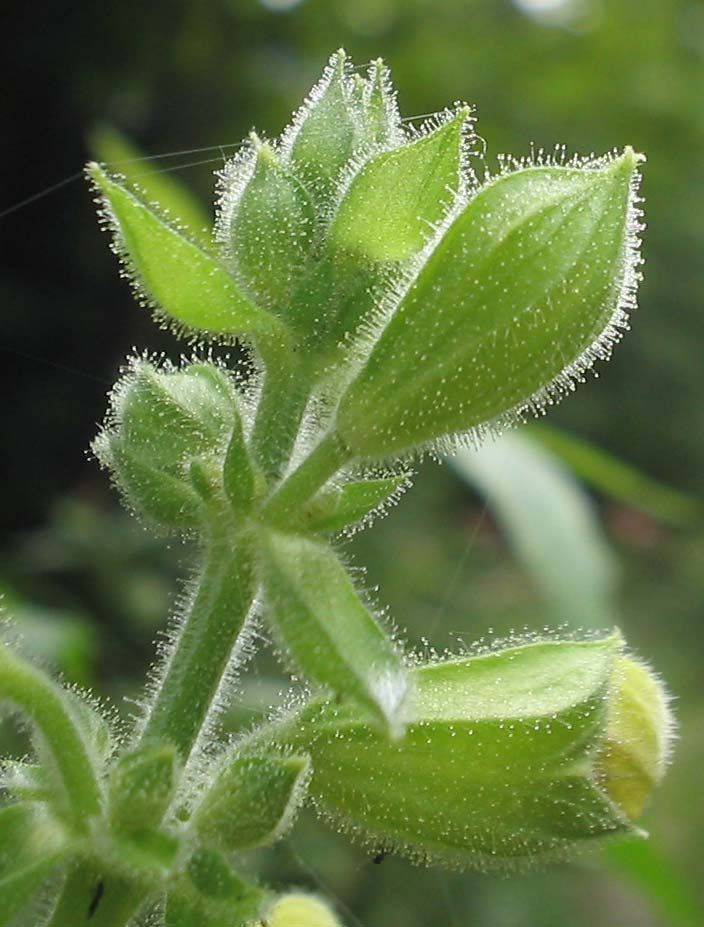
The glandular hairs of Salvia glutinosa
