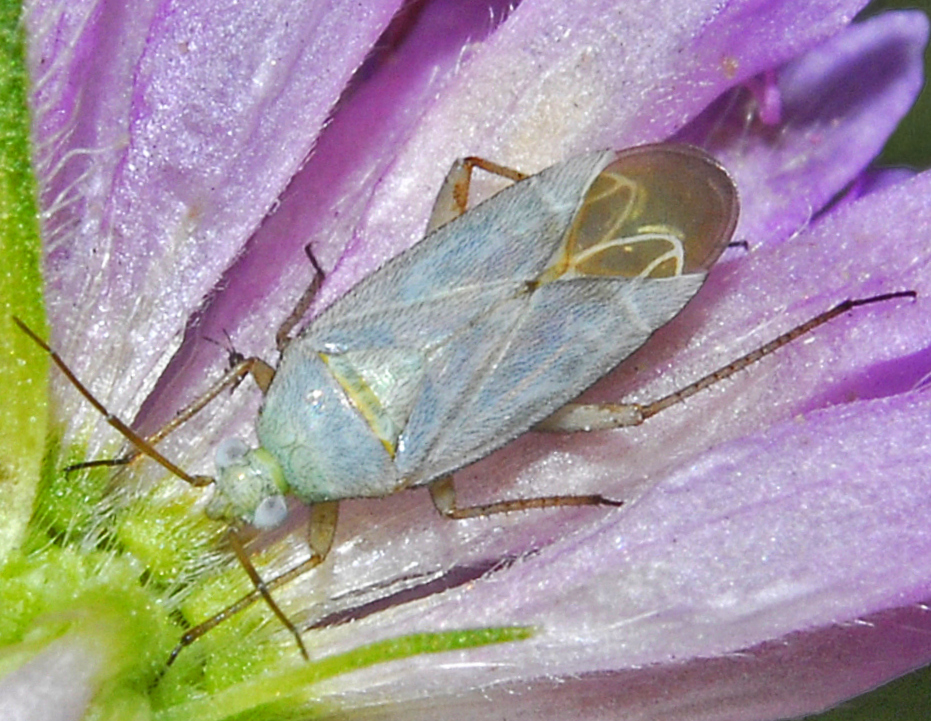
- Placochilus seladonicus

Scientific classification
- Domain: Eukaryota
- Kingdom: Animalia
- Phylum: Arthropoda
- Class: Insecta
- Order: Hemiptera
- Suborder: Heteroptera
- Family: Miridae
- Tribe: Phylini
- Genus: Placochilus; Fieber, 1858

= Placochilus =

Genus of true bugs

Placochilus is a genus of insects in the family Miridae, the plant bugs.

== Species ==
Species within this genus include:

- Placochilus paraseladonicus Qi and Nonnaizab, 1995
- Placochilus seladonicus (Fallén, 1807)
