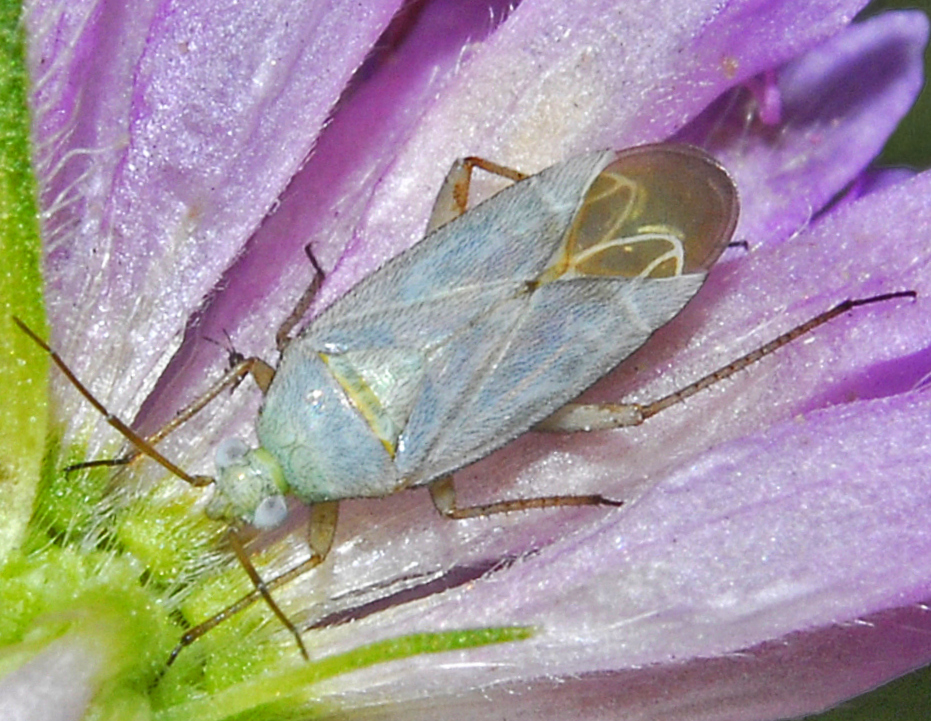
- Placochilus seladonicus. Adult.

Scientific classification
- Domain: Eukaryota
- Kingdom: Animalia
- Phylum: Arthropoda
- Class: Insecta
- Order: Hemiptera
- Suborder: Heteroptera
- Family: Miridae
- Genus: Placochilus
- Species: P. seladonicus

Binomial name
- Placochilus seladonicus (Fallén, 1807)

= Placochilus seladonicus =

Species of true bug

Placochilus seladonicus is a species of insect in the family Miridae, the plant bugs.

== Subspecies ==
Subspecies include:

- Placochilus seladonicus mediterraneus Josifov, 1969
- Placochilus seladonicus seladonicus (Fallén, 1807

== Distribution and habitat ==
This species is present in most of Europe. It can be found on dry meadows, roadsides, as well as on areas with tall grassy vegetation or where the preferred host plants live.

== Description ==
Placochilus seladonicus can reach a length of about 5 millimetres (0.20 in). These small mirids show a dull, whitish blue or gray green body and big eyes.

== Biology ==
Placochilus seladonicus is a univoltine species. Adults can be found from mid June to mid August. Eggs overwinter. Nymphs and adults feed on leaves and stems of various plants, especially on flower heads or flower buds of field scabious (Knautia arvensis) that match the color of adult insects.

== Bibliography ==
- NAU, B.S. 1994. Notes on Placochilus seladonicus (Fall.) (Hem., Miridae) in Britain. Entomologist's Monthly Magazine, 130: 209-210
- NAU, B.S. 1978. Two plant bugs new to Britain, Placochilus seladonicus (Fall) and Campylomma annulicornis (Sig.) (Heteroptera, Miridae). Entomologist's Monthly Magazine, 114,157-159.
