= List of Rhyparochrominae genera =

These 434 genera belong to Rhyparochrominae, a subfamily of dirt-colored seed bugs in the family Rhyparochromidae. There are more than 2,100 described species in Rhyparochrominae.

== Rhyparochrominae genera ==
Family Rhyparochromidae
Genus Amicrops Montrouzier, 1858
Genus Anisocoris Walker, 1872

Subfamily Plinthisinae
Genus Bosbequius Distant, 1904
Genus Plinthisus Stephens, 1829
Subfamily Rhyparochrominae

Tribe Antillocorini
Genus Acolhua Distant, 1893
Genus Antillocoris Kirkaldy, 1904
Genus Antillodema Slater, 1980
Genus Arimacoris Baranowski & Slater, 1987
Genus Baeocoris Slater, 1983
Genus Bathydema Uhler, 1893
Genus Bocundostethus Scudder, 1962
Genus Botocudo Kirkaldy, 1904
Genus Branstettocoris Brailovsky, 2010
Genus Caeneusia Strand, 1928
Genus Caymanis Baranowski & Brambila, 2001
Genus Cligenes Distant, 1893
Genus Gemmacoris Baranowski & Slater, 1987
Genus Homoscelis Horvath, 1884
Genus Iodinus Lindberg, 1927
Genus Kinundastethus Scudder, 1962
Genus Lethaeaster Breddin, 1905
Genus Lethaeastroides Malipatil & Woodward, 1989
Genus Microcoris Bergroth, 1908
Genus Microlugenocoris Scudder, 1962
Genus Neopoliocoris Zhang & Chen, 2015
Genus Nympholethaeus Woodward, 1959
Genus Paradema Slater, 1980
Genus Paurocoris Slater, 1980
Genus Polycligenes Scudder, 1962
Genus Pulmomerus Cervantes & Brailovsky, 2012
Genus Schuhocoris Slater, 1985
Genus Scythinus Distant, 1893
Genus Siniasinensis Scudder, 1968
Genus Terenocoris Slater, 1980
Genus Tomocoris Woodward, 1953
Genus Tomocoroides Woodward, 1963
Genus Trachinocoris Slater, 1980
Genus Tropistethus Fieber, 1861
Genus Valeris Brambila, 2000
Tribe Cleradini
Genus Arcleda Malipatil, 1981
Genus Austroclerada Malipatil, 1981
Genus Clerada Signoret, 1863
Genus Clerocarbus Scudder, 1969
Genus Dendezia Scudder, 1963
Genus Dyakana Distant, 1906
Genus Harmostica Bergroth, 1918
Genus Kanadyana Scudder, 1963
Genus Laticlerada Malipatil, 1981
Genus Mahisa Distant, 1906
Genus Navarrus Distant, 1901
Genus Neoclerada Malipatil, 1981
Genus Pactye Stal, 1865
Genus Panchaea Stal, 1865
Genus Paramahisa Malipatil, 1981
Genus Parapactye Malipatil, 1983
Genus Pholeolygaeus Deboutteville & Paulian, 1952
Genus Prehensocoris Harrington, 1988
Genus Reclada White, 1878
Tribe Drymini
Genus Appolonius Distant, 1901
Genus Austrodrymus Gross, 1965
Genus Bexiocoris Scudder, 1969
Genus Borneodrymus Kondorosy, 2006
Genus Brachydrymus Gross, 1965
Genus Brentiscerus Scudder, 1962
Genus Carvalhodrymus Slater, 1995
Genus Chotekia China, 1935
Genus Coracodrymus Breddin, 1901
Genus Drymus Fieber, 1861
Genus Dudia Bergroth, 1918
Genus Entisberus Distant, 1903
Genus Eremocoris Fieber, 1861
Genus Esinerus Scudder, 1969
Genus Faelicianus Distant, 1901
Genus Gastrodes Westwood, 1840
Genus Gastrodomorpha Gross, 1965
Genus Grossander Slater, 1976
Genus Heissodrymus Kondorosy, 2006
Genus Hidakacoris Tomokuni, 1998
Genus Hirtomydrus Scudder, 1978
Genus Ibexocoris Scudder, 1963
Genus Ischnocoris Fieber, 1861
Genus Kanigara Distant, 1906
Genus Lamproplax Douglas & Scott, 1868
Genus Latidrymus Kondorosy, 2017
Genus Lemnius Distant, 1904
Genus Malipatilius Kondorosy, 2013
Genus Megadrymus Gross, 1965
Genus Mizaldus Distant, 1901
Genus Neodudia Scudder, 1978
Genus Neomizaldus Scudder, 1968
Genus Notochilaster Breddin, 1907
Genus Notochilus Fieber, 1864
Genus Orsillodes Puton, 1884
Genus Paradieuches Distant, 1883
Genus Paradrymus Bergroth, 1916
Genus Parastilbocoris Carayon, 1964
Genus Pilusodrymus Scudder, 1969
Genus Potamiaena Distant, 1910
Genus Pseudodrymus Gross, 1965
Genus Retoka China, 1935
Genus Retrodrymus Gross, 1965
Genus Rhodiginus Distant, 1901
Genus Salaciola Bergroth, 1906
Genus Scolopostethus Fieber, 1861
Genus Sinierus Distant, 1901
Genus Stilbocoris Bergroth, 1893
Genus Taphropeltus Stal, 1872
Genus Testudodrymus Slater, 1993
Genus Thaumastopus Fieber, 1870
Genus Thebanus Distant, 1904
Genus Thylochromus Barber, 1928
Genus Togodolentus Barber, 1918
Genus Trichodrymus Lindberg, 1927
Genus Udalricus Distant, 1904
Genus Usilanus Distant, 1909
Genus Uzza Distant, 1909

Genus Exitelus Scudder, 1890
Genus Getes Bergroth, 1916

Tribe Gonianotini
Genus Alampes Horvath, 1884
Genus Aoploscelis Fieber, 1861
Genus Aphanus Laporte & de Castelnau, 1832
Genus Armenoecus Kiritshenko & Scudder, 1973
Genus Atrazonotus Slater & Ashlock, 1966
Genus Bleteogonus Reuter, 1885
Genus Claudinerobius Brailovsky, 1978
Genus Delochilocoris Bergroth, 1893
Genus Diomphalus Fieber, 1864
Genus Emblethis Fieber, 1861
Genus Facicoris Kiritshenko & Scudder, 1973
Genus Gonianotus Fieber, 1861
Genus Hyalocoris Jakovlev, 1874
Genus Ischnopeza Fieber, 1861
Genus Macrodema Fieber, 1861
Genus Malezonotus Barber, 1918
Genus Neurocladus Fieber, 1861
Genus Parapolycrates Reuter, 1885
Genus Pionosomus Fieber, 1861
Genus Pterotmetus Amyot & Serville, 1843
Genus Spinigernotus Scudder, 1984
Genus Trapezonotus Fieber, 1861

Tribe Lethaeini
Genus Adauctus Distant, 1909
Genus Afromydrus Scudder, 1968
Genus Aristaenetoides Kondorosy, 2006
Genus Aristaenetus Distant, 1901
Genus Atkinsonianus Distant, 1909
Genus Austroxestus Woodward, 1962
Genus Bubaces Distant, 1893
Genus Camptocera Jakovlev, 1877
Genus Carabocoris Gross, 1958
Genus Cistalia Stal, 1874
Genus Coleocoris Gross, 1958
Genus Cryphula Stal, 1874
Genus Diniella Bergroth, 1893
Genus Esuris Stal, 1874
Genus Exomyocara Slater & Woodward, 1974
Genus Gonatoides Slater, 1957
Genus Hexatrichocoris Kiritshenko, 1931
Genus Lamproceps Reuter, 1882
Genus Lampropunctus Scudder, 1971
Genus Lethaeograndellus Scudder, 1962
Genus Lethaeus Dallas, 1852
Genus Lipostemmata Berg, 1879
Genus Lophoraglius Wagner, 1961
Genus Margolethaeus Zsalakovics & Kondorosy, 2014
Genus Miogonates Sailer & Carvalho, 1957
Genus Myocara Bergroth, 1916
Genus Neolethaeus Distant, 1909
Genus Neopetissius O’Donnell, 2001
Genus Noteolethaeus Woodward & Slater, 1962
Genus Orbellis Distant, 1913
Genus Paragonatas Barber, 1939
Genus Paramyocara Woodward & Malipatil, 1977
Genus Petissius Distant, 1893
Genus Porrectolethaeus Scudder, 1971
Genus Ptilocamptocera Wagner, 1961
Genus Rhaptus Stal, 1874
Genus Scobinigaster Kondorosy & Banar, 2020
Genus Stictolethaeus O'Donnell, 1991
Genus Tuitocoris Cervantes, 2012
Genus Valtissius Barber, 1918
Genus Xestocoris Van Duzee, 1906

Genus Liabaris Horvath, 1888

Tribe Lilliputocorini
Genus Lilliputocoris Slater & Woodward, 1979
Tribe Megalonotini
Genus Afralampes Slater, 1998
Genus Allocentrum Bergroth, 1894
Genus Anepsiocoris Puton, 1886
Genus Anepsiodes Reuter, 1882
Genus Dermatinoides Slater & Sweet, 1973
Genus Hadrocnemis Jakovlev, 1881
Genus Hispanocoris Costas & Vázquez, 1999
Genus Icus Fieber, 1861
Genus Lamprodema Fieber, 1861
Genus Lasiocoris Fieber, 1861
Genus Leptomelus Jakovlev, 1881
Genus Megalonotus Fieber, 1861
Genus Metastenothorax Reuter, 1884
Genus Microthisus Lindberg, 1958
Genus Pezocoris Jakovlev, 1875
Genus Piezoscelis Fieber, 1870
Genus Polycrates Stal, 1865
Genus Proderus Fieber, 1861
Genus Sphragisticus Stal, 1872
Genus Tempereocoris Pericart, 1995
Genus Tethallotrum Scudder, 1962
Tribe Myodochini
Genus Acrolophyses Dellapé & Henry, 2010
Genus Aegyptocoris China, 1936
Genus Afrovertanus Scudder, 1962
Genus Andercnemodus Brailovsky & Cervantes, 2011
Genus Ashlockaria Harrington, 1980
Genus Bacacephalus Harrington, 1980
Genus Baranowskiobius Dellapé, Melo & Henry, 2016
Genus Bergicoris Dellapé, 2010
Genus Caenopamera Barber, 1918
Genus Carpilis Stal, 1874
Genus Catenes Distant, 1893
Genus Cholula Distant, 1893
Genus Cnemodus Herrich-Schaeffer, 1850
Genus Distingphyses Scudder, 1962
Genus Dushinckanus Brailovsky, 1979
Genus Ereminellus Harrington, 1980
Genus Erlacda Signoret, 1863
Genus Eucosmetus Bergroth, 1894
Genus Euparomius Hedge, 1990
Genus Exopamera Distant, 1918
Genus Exopamerana Malipatil, 1978
Genus Fontathanus Scudder, 1963
Genus Froeschneria Harrington, 1980
Genus Gyndes Stal, 1862
Genus Henicopamerana Malipatil, 1986
Genus Henicorthaea Malipatil, 1978
Genus Henryaria Dellapé, Melo & Montemayor, 2018
Genus Heraeus Stal, 1862
Genus Horridipamera Malipatil, 1978
Genus Humilocoris Harrington, 1980
Genus Incrassoceps Scudder, 1978
Genus Kolenetrus Barber, 1918
Genus Ligyrocoris Stal, 1872
Genus Megacholula Harrington, 1980
Genus Megapamera Scudder, 1975
Genus Mimobius Poppius & Bergroth, 1921
Genus Myodacanthus Dellapé, 2012
Genus Myodocha Latreille, 1807
Genus Myodorthaea Malipatil, 1978
Genus Neocnemodus Dellapé & Malipatil, 2012
Genus Neomyocoris Dellapé & Montemayor, 2008
Genus Neopamera Harrington, 1980
Genus Orthaea Dallas, 1852
Genus Pachybrachius Hahn, 1826
Genus Paisana Dellapé, 2008
Genus Pamerana Distant, 1909
Genus Pamerapa Malipatil, 1978
Genus Pamerarma Malipatil, 1978
Genus Paracholula Harrington, 1980
Genus Paraheraeus Dellapé, Melo & Henry, 2016
Genus Parapamerana Malipatil, 1980
Genus Paraparomius Harrington, 1980
Genus Paromius Fieber, 1861
Genus Pephysena Distant, 1893
Genus Perigenes Distant, 1893
Genus Prytanes Distant, 1893
Genus Pseudocnemodus Barber, 1911
Genus Pseudolaryngodus Malipatil & Gao, 2019
Genus Pseudopachybrachius Malipatil, 1978
Genus Pseudopamera Distant, 1893
Genus Pseudoparomius Harrington, 1980
Genus Ptochiomera Say, 1831
Genus Remaudiereana Hoberlandt, 1954
Genus Scintillocoris Slater & Brailovsky, 1993
Genus Shinckadunus Dellapé & Melo, 2020
Genus Sisamnes Distant, 1893
Genus Slaterobius Harrington, 1980
Genus Stalaria Harrington, 1980
Genus Stigmatonotum Lindberg, 1927
Genus Stridulocoris Harrington, 1980
Genus Suffenus Distant, 1904
Genus Tenuicoris Slater & Harrington, 1974
Genus Thoraea Dellapé & Montemayor, 2011
Genus Togo Bergroth, 1906
Genus Valonetus Barber, 1918
Genus Villalobosothignus Brailovsky, 1984
Genus Woodwardocoris Malipatil, 1978
Genus Xenydrium Poppius & Bergroth, 1921
Genus Zeridoneus Barber, 1918
Genus Zeropamera Barber, 1948
Genus †Catopamera Scudder, 1890
Genus †Cophocoris Scudder, 1890
Genus †Ctereacoris Scudder, 1890
Genus †Eucorites Scudder, 1890
Genus †Lithocoris Scudder, 1890
Genus †Phrudopamera Scudder, 1890
Genus †Procoris Scudder, 1890
Genus †Stenopamera Scudder, 1890

Genus Nesodromus Bergroth, 1905

Tribe Ozophorini
Genus Allotrophora Slater & Brailovsky, 1983
Genus Balboa Distant, 1893
Genus Bedunia Stal, 1874
Genus Bergidea Breddin, 1897
Genus Brailovskyocoris Slater, 1994
Genus Bryanellocoris Slater, 1957
Genus Cervicoris Slater, 1982
Genus Cryptotrophora Brailovsky & Barrera, 2016
Genus Ethaltomarus Scudder, 1963
Genus Gressittocoris Slater & Zheng, 1985
Genus Icaracoris Slater, 1985
Genus Longinischus Brailovsky, 2009
Genus Longinomerus Brailovsky & Barrera, 2010
Genus Lygofuscanellus Scudder, 1962
Genus Marmottania Puton & Lethierry, 1887
Genus Micrymenus Bergroth, 1921
Genus Migdilybs Hesse, 1925
Genus Neolonginischus Brailovsky & Barrera, 2016
Genus Noualhieria Puton, 1889
Genus Omacrus Bergroth, 1916
Genus Ozophora Uhler, 1871
Genus Pamozophora Ashlock & Slater, 1982
Genus Paraporta Zheng, 1981
Genus Porta Distant, 1903
Genus Primierus Distant, 1901
Genus Prosomoeus Scott, 1874
Genus Pseudomenotelus Brailovsky & Cervantes, 2009
Genus Pseudomenus Ashlock & Slater, 1982
Genus Rugomenus Ashlock, 1985
Genus Tachytatus Bergroth, 1918
Genus Vertomannus Distant, 1903
Tribe Phasmosomini
Genus Phasmosomus Kiritshenko, 1938

Genus Prostemmidea Reuter, 1893

Tribe Rhyparochromini
Genus Acroraglius Wagner, 1961
Genus Aellopideus Seidenstucker, 1963
Genus Aellopus Wolff, 1802
Genus Altomarus Distant, 1903
Genus Beosus Amyot & Serville, 1843
Genus Callistonotus Horvath, 1906
Genus Caprochromus Scudder, 1968
Genus Caridops Bergroth, 1894
Genus Cordillonotus Scudder, 1984
Genus Cyrtocnemodon Eyles & Scudder, 1968
Genus Dieuches Dohrn, 1860
Genus Distadieuches Scudder, 1968
Genus Ectyphoscelus Eyles, 1968
Genus Elasmolomus Stal, 1872
Genus Graphoraglius Wagner, 1961
Genus Graptopeltus Stal, 1872
Genus Lanchnophorus Reuter, 1887
Genus Liolobus Reuter, 1885
Genus Metadieuches Distant, 1918
Genus Metochus Scott, 1874
Genus Microtomideus Reuter, 1885
Genus Naphiellus Scudder, 1962
Genus Naphius Stal, 1874
Genus Narbo Stal, 1865
Genus Naudarensia Distant, 1904
Genus Nocellochromus Scudder, 1963
Genus Orieotrechus Scudder, 1962
Genus Orphnotrechus Sweet, 1991
Genus Panaorus Kiritshenko, 1951
Genus Perimeda Reuter, 1887
Genus Peritrechus Fieber, 1861
Genus Phorcinus Stal, 1874
Genus Plinthurgus Kiritshenko, 1911
Genus Poeantius Stal, 1865
Genus Quiobbesus Scudder, 1968
Genus Ragliodes Reuter, 1885
Genus Raglius Stal, 1872
Genus Rhyparochromus Hahn, 1826
Genus Rhyparoclava Kment, Hemala & BaŇar, 2016
Genus Rhyparothesus Scudder, 1962
Genus Rollathemus Scudder, 1963
Genus Scudderocoris Dellapé, Melo, Montemayor & Kondorosy, 2017
Genus Stizocephalus Eyles, 1970
Genus Trichaphanus Kiritshenko, 1926
Genus Uhleriola Horvath, 1908
Genus Xanthochilus Stål, 1872
Genus †Prolygaeus Scudder, 1890

Genus Speusippas Distant, 1901

Tribe Stygnocorini
Genus Acompus Fieber, 1861
Genus Anneckocoris Slater, 1982
Genus Arrianus Distant, 1904
Genus Capenicola Slater & Sweet, 1970
Genus Esuridea Reuter, 1890
Genus Hyalochilus Fieber, 1861
Genus Lasiosomus Fieber, 1861
Genus Margareta White, 1878
Genus Notiocola Slater & Sweet, 1970
Genus Paracnemodus Slater, 1964
Genus Stygnocoris Douglas & Scott, 1865
Genus Stygnocorisella Hoberlandt, 1956
Genus Sweetocoris O'Rourke, 1974
Genus Tasmanicola Slater & Sweet, 1970
Tribe Targaremini
Genus Australotarma Woodward, 1978
Genus Baladeana Distant, 1914
Genus Calotargemus Scudder, 1978
Genus Forsterocoris Woodward, 1953
Genus Geratarma Malipatil, 1977
Genus Hebrolethaeus Scudder, 1962
Genus Lachnophoroides Distant, 1914
Genus Metagerra White, 1878
Genus Millerocoris Eyles, 1967
Genus Mirrhina Distant, 1920
Genus Paramirrhina Malipatil, 1983
Genus Paratruncala Malipatil, 1977
Genus Popondochromus Dellapé & Henry, 2020
Genus Regatarma Woodward, 1953
Genus Ruavatua Miller, 1956
Genus Sylvacligenes Scudder, 1962
Genus Targarema White, 1878
Genus Targarops Woodward, 1978
Genus Truncala Woodward, 1953
Genus Truncaloides Woodward, 1978
Genus Trypetocoris Woodward, 1953
Genus Woodwardiana Malipatil, 1977
Tribe Udeocorini
Genus Astemmoplitus Spinola, 1852
Genus Bathycles Distant, 1893
Genus Cryptocoris Gross, 1962
Genus Daerlac Signoret, 1881
Genus Euander Stal, 1865
Genus Fontejanus Breddin, 1904
Genus Fontejus Stal, 1862
Genus Insulicola Kirkaldy, 1908
Genus Laryngodus Herrich-Schaeffer, 1850
Genus Neosuris Barber, 1924
Genus Porander Gross, 1962
Genus Serranegra Lindberg, 1958
Genus Telocoris Gross, 1962
Genus Tempyra Stal, 1874
Genus Udeocoris Bergroth, 1918
Genus Udeopamera Slater, 1978
Genus Zygocoris Gross, 1962

Genus †Coptochromus Scudder, 1890
Genus †Cryptochromus Scudder, 1890
Genus †Linnaea Scudder, 1890
Genus †Lithochromus Scudder, 1890
Genus †Necrochromus Scudder, 1890
Genus †Praenotochilus Theobald, 1937
Genus †Tiromerus Scudder, 1890
