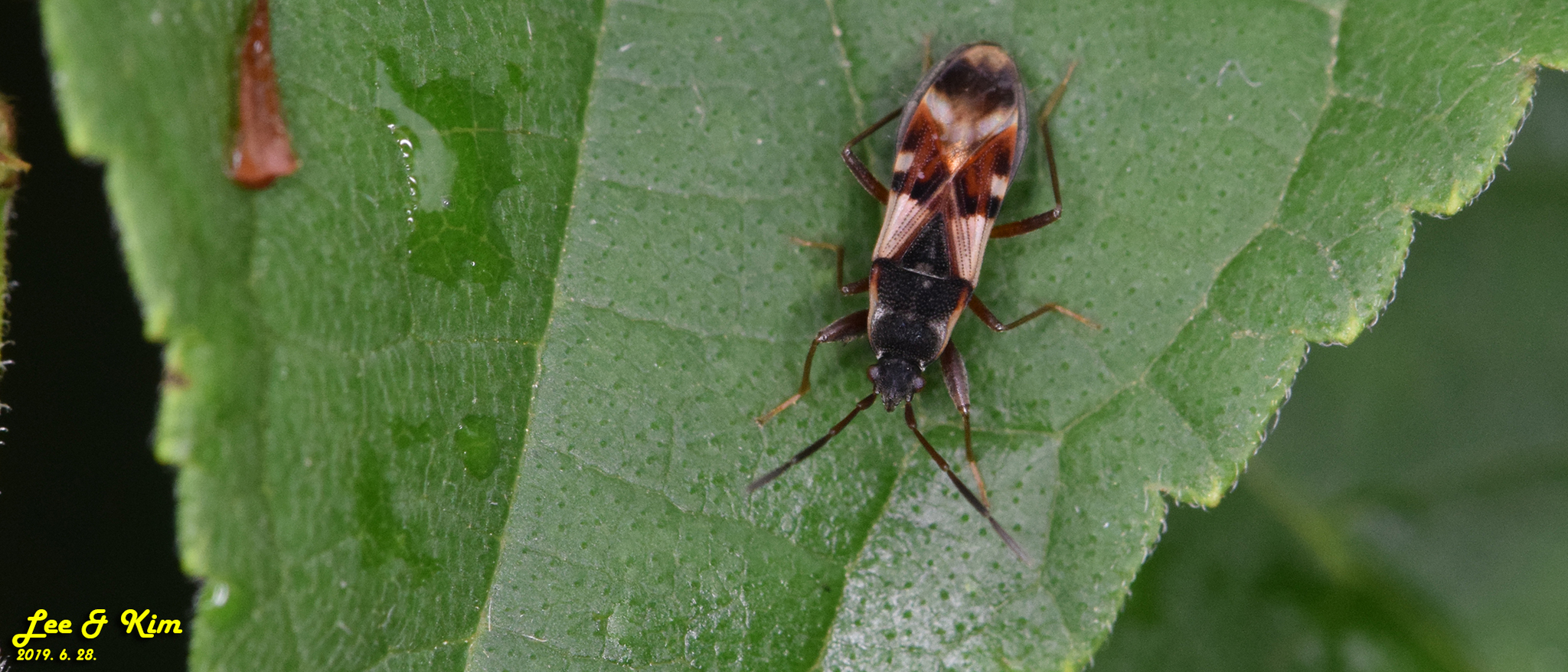
- Paradieuches dissimilis, South Korea

Scientific classification
- Domain: Eukaryota
- Kingdom: Animalia
- Phylum: Arthropoda
- Class: Insecta
- Order: Hemiptera
- Suborder: Heteroptera
- Family: Rhyparochromidae
- Subfamily: Rhyparochrominae
- Tribe: Drymini
- Genus: Paradieuches
- Species: P. dissimilis

Binomial name
- Paradieuches dissimilis (Distant, 1883)

= Paradieuches dissimilis =

Species of true bug

Paradieuches dissimilis is a species of dirt-colored seed bug in the family Rhyparochromidae, found in eastern Asia.
