= Chotekia =

Scientific classification
- Kingdom: Animalia
- Phylum: Arthropoda
- Class: Insecta
- Order: Hemiptera
- Suborder: Heteroptera
- Family: Rhyparochromidae
- Subfamily: Rhyparochrominae
- Tribe: Drymini
- Genus: Chotekia; China, 1935
- Species: C. typica

Binomial name
- Chotekia typica China, 1935

Genus of seed bugs

Chotekia is a genus of seed bugs in the tribe Drymini, erected by William Edward China in 1935. The genus contains the single species Chotekia typica from Java.
