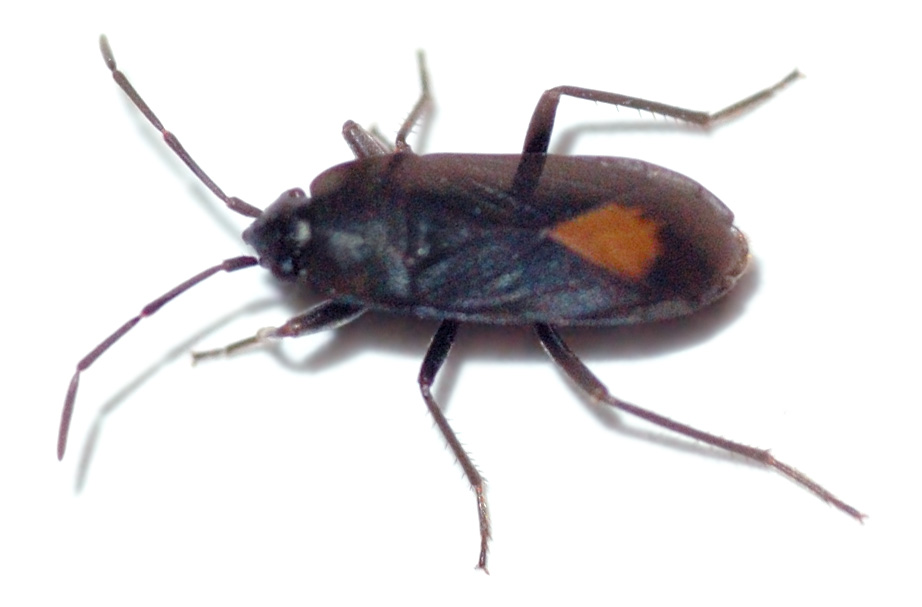
- Aphanus rolandri

Scientific classification
- Domain: Eukaryota
- Kingdom: Animalia
- Phylum: Arthropoda
- Class: Insecta
- Order: Hemiptera
- Suborder: Heteroptera
- Family: Rhyparochromidae
- Subfamily: Rhyparochrominae
- Tribe: Gonianotini

= Gonianotini =

Tribe of true bugs

Gonianotini is a tribe of dirt-colored seed bugs in the family Rhyparochromidae. There are more than 20 genera and 140 described species in Gonianotini.

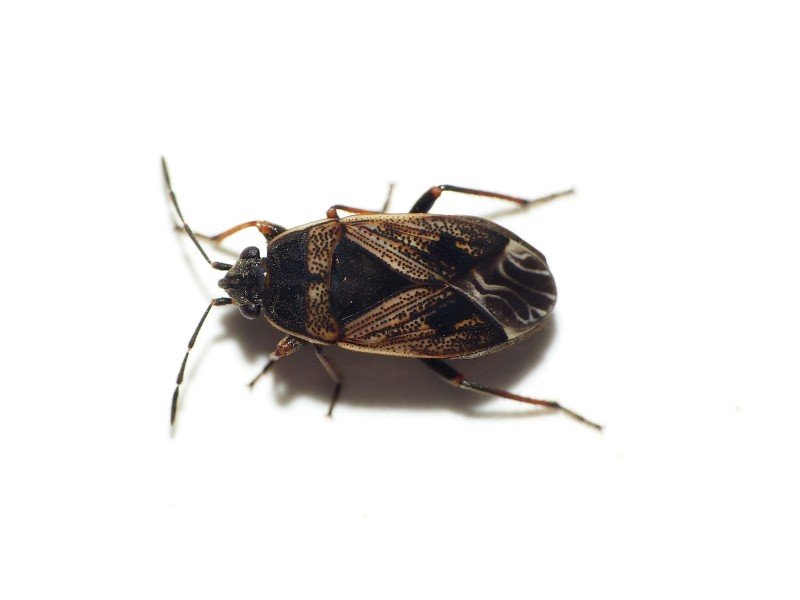
Trapezonotus dispar

== Genera ==
These 22 genera belong to the tribe Gonianotini:

- Alampes Horvath, 1884
- Aoploscelis Fieber, 1861
- Aphanus Laporte & de Castelnau, 1832
- Armenoecus Kiritshenko & Scudder, 1973
- Atrazonotus Slater & Ashlock, 1966
- Bleteogonus Reuter, 1885
- Claudinerobius Brailovsky, 1978
- Delochilocoris Bergroth, 1893
- Diomphalus Fieber, 1864
- Emblethis Fieber, 1861
- Facicoris Kiritshenko & Scudder, 1973
- Gonianotus Fieber, 1861
- Hyalocoris Jakovlev, 1874
- Ischnopeza Fieber, 1861
- Macrodema Fieber, 1861
- Malezonotus Barber, 1918
- Neurocladus Fieber, 1861
- Parapolycrates Reuter, 1885
- Pionosomus Fieber, 1861
- Pterotmetus Amyot & Serville, 1843
- Spinigernotus Scudder, 1984
- Trapezonotus Fieber, 1861
