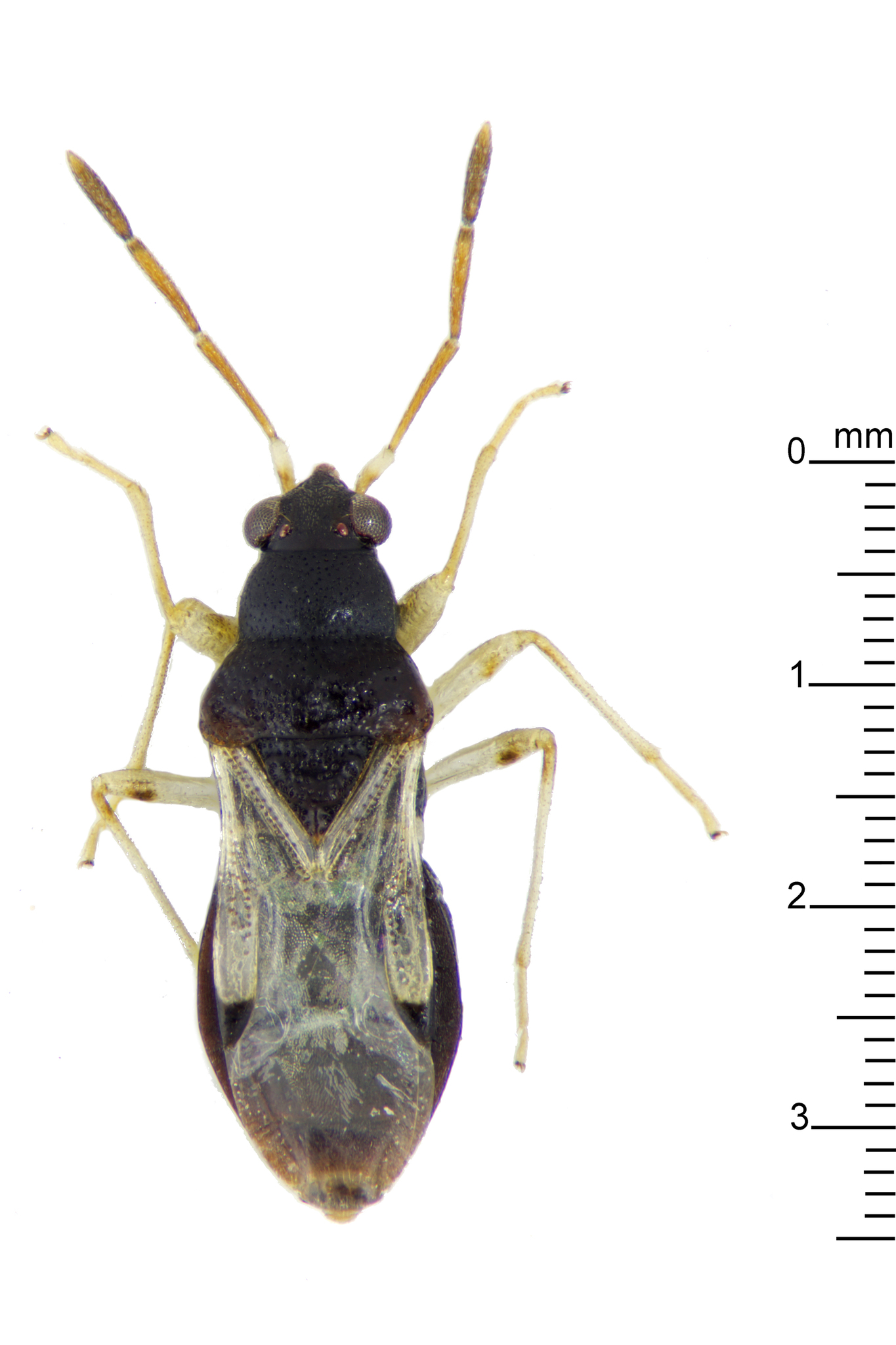
- Mizaldus montiscandens (northern Borneo)

Scientific classification
- Kingdom: Animalia
- Phylum: Arthropoda
- Clade: Pancrustacea
- Class: Insecta
- Order: Hemiptera
- Suborder: Heteroptera
- Family: Rhyparochromidae
- Subfamily: Rhyparochrominae
- Tribe: Drymini
- Genus: Mizaldus; Distant, 1901

Synonyms
- Ampera Distant, 1919

= Mizaldus =

Genus of insects

Mizaldus is a genus of seed bugs in the family Rhyparochromidae and tribe Drymini, erected by William Lucas Distant in 1901. The known species distribution appears to include Africa, Japan, Malesia through to New Guinea.

== Species ==
The Lygaeoidea Species File includes:

1. Mizaldus carvalhoi Slater, 1995
2. Mizaldus gotoi (Hidaka, 1959)
3. Mizaldus hirashimai (Hidaka, 1961) - Japan
4. Mizaldus intrusa (Distant, 1919)
5. Mizaldus lestoni Slater, 1995
6. Mizaldus linnavuorii Slater, 1995
7. Mizaldus montiscandens Bergroth, 1918 - Borneo, Philippines
8. Mizaldus nidulus Slater & Carayon, 1963 - West Africa
9. Mizaldus sinuaticollis Linnavuori, 1978 - Sudan
10. Mizaldus sylvaticus Krüger, 2019 - Liberia
11. Mizaldus tenuis Slater, 1995
12. Mizaldus woodwardi Slater & Carayon, 1963 - type species (by subsequent designation) - New Guinea
