= Uzza =

Scientific classification
- Kingdom: Animalia
- Phylum: Arthropoda
- Class: Insecta
- Order: Hemiptera
- Suborder: Heteroptera
- Family: Rhyparochromidae
- Subfamily: Rhyparochrominae
- Tribe: Drymini
- Genus: Uzza; Distant, 1909
- Species: U. karenia

Binomial name
- Uzza karenia Distant, 1909

Genus of Hemiptera

Uzza is a monotypic genus of seed bugs in the tribe Drymini, erected by William Lucas Distant in 1909. It contains the single species Uzza karenia from Indochina and southern China.
