= Rhodiginus =

Scientific classification
- Kingdom: Animalia
- Phylum: Arthropoda
- Clade: Pancrustacea
- Class: Insecta
- Order: Hemiptera
- Suborder: Heteroptera
- Family: Rhyparochromidae
- Subfamily: Rhyparochrominae
- Tribe: Drymini
- Genus: Rhodiginus; Distant, 1901

Genus of insects

Rhodiginus is a genus of seed bugs in the tribe Drymini, erected by William Lucas Distant 1901. There are three species: Rhodiginus ceylonicus (Lethierry & Severin, 1894) from Sri Lanka, Rhodiginus pullatus Bergroth, 1918 from the Philippines, and Rhodiginus monteithi from Queensland, Australia.
