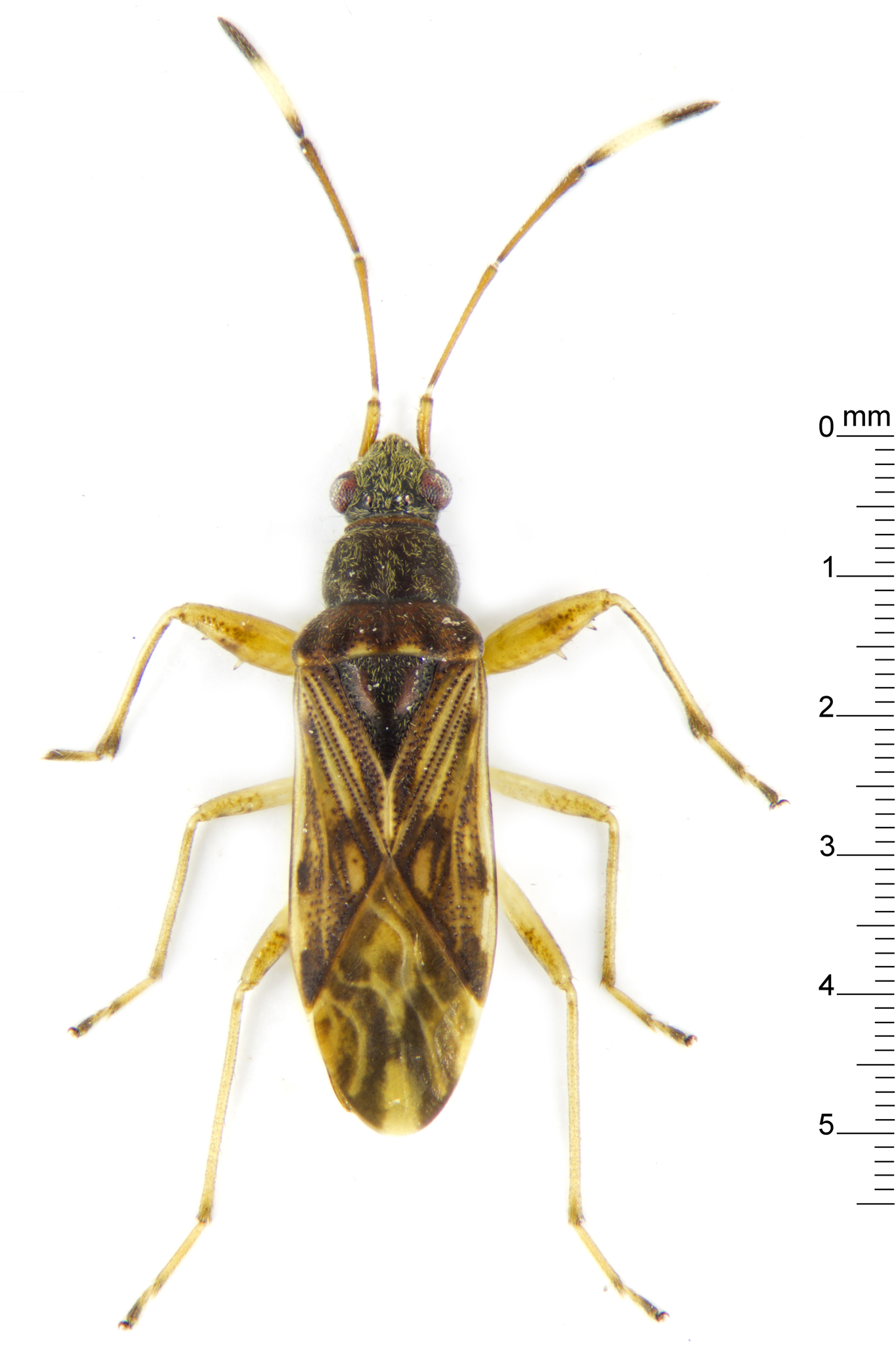
- Pamerarma ventralis, Brunei

Scientific classification
- Domain: Eukaryota
- Kingdom: Animalia
- Phylum: Arthropoda
- Class: Insecta
- Order: Hemiptera
- Suborder: Heteroptera
- Family: Rhyparochromidae
- Subfamily: Rhyparochrominae
- Tribe: Myodochini
- Genus: Pamerarma
- Species: P. ventralis

Binomial name
- Pamerarma ventralis (China, 1930)

= Pamerarma ventralis =

Species of true bug

Pamerarma ventralis is a species of dirt-colored seed bug in the family Rhyparochromidae. They are found in Southeast Asia, Australia, and Pacific Islands.
