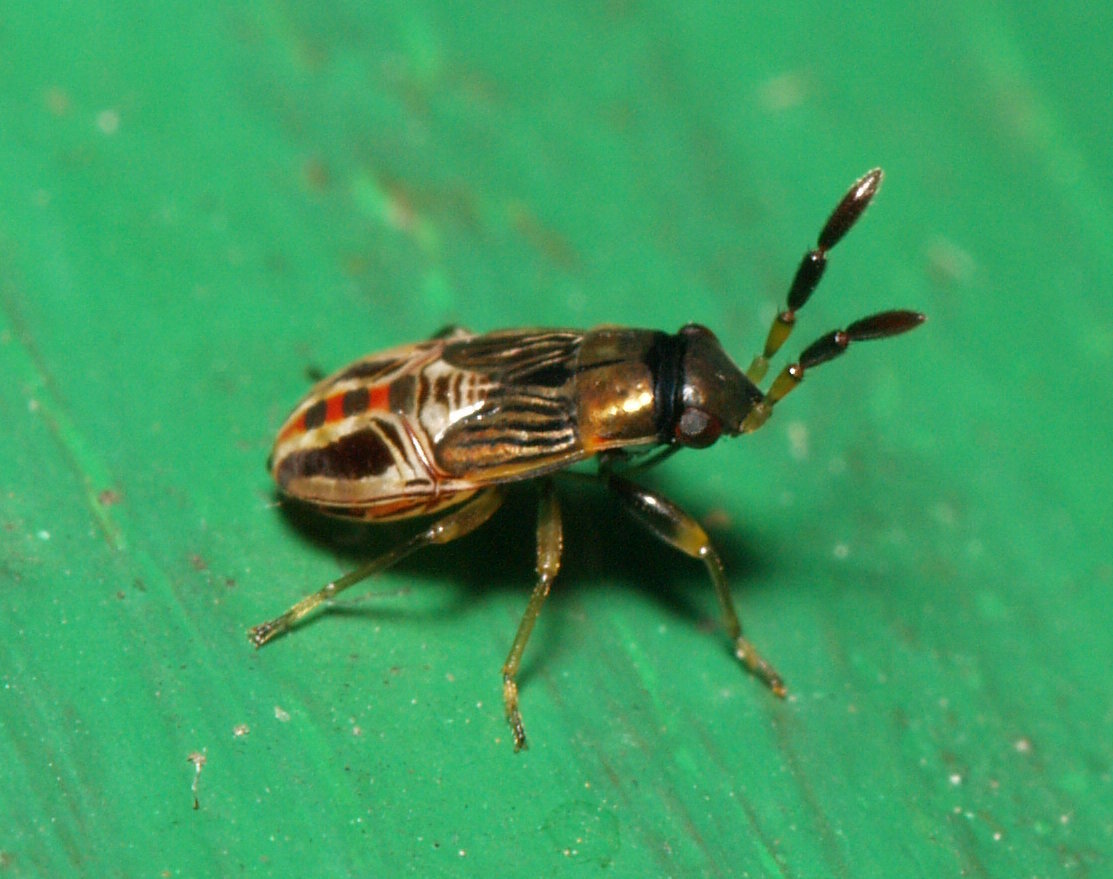
- Appolonius crassus

Scientific classification
- Domain: Eukaryota
- Kingdom: Animalia
- Phylum: Arthropoda
- Class: Insecta
- Order: Hemiptera
- Suborder: Heteroptera
- Family: Rhyparochromidae
- Subfamily: Rhyparochrominae
- Tribe: Drymini
- Genus: Appolonius; Distant, 1901

= Appolonius (bug) =

Genus of insects

Appolonius is a genus of seed bugs in the tribe Drymini of the family Rhyparochromidae. There are about 12 described species in Appolonius, found in Indomalaya and Oceania.

== Species ==
These 12 species belong to the genus Appolonius:

- Appolonius cincticornis (Walker, 1872)
- Appolonius compactilis (Bergroth, 1918)
- Appolonius crassus (Distant, 1906)
- Appolonius dentatus Chopra & Rustagi, 1982
- Appolonius errabundus Scudder, 1968
- Appolonius indicus Chopra & Rustagi, 1982
- Appolonius oblongus Tomokuni, 1995
- Appolonius picturatus Distant, 1918
- Appolonius quadratus Scudder, 1956
- Appolonius robustus Gross, 1965
- Appolonius salacioloides Slater, 1994
- Appolonius territorialis Gross, 1965
