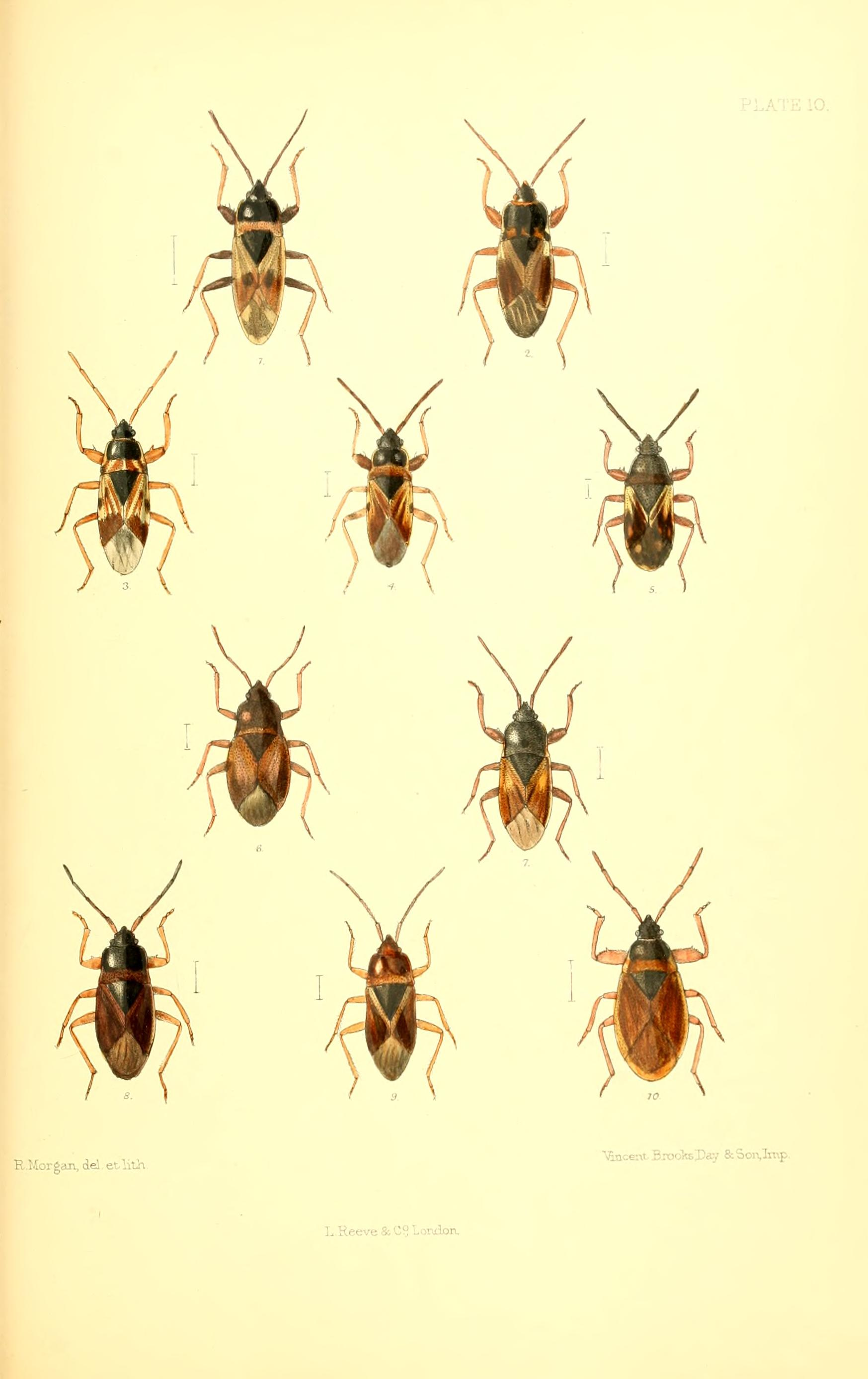
- Taphropeltus contractus depicted in Edward Saunders Hemiptera Heteroptera of the British Islands (figure 5)

Scientific classification
- Domain: Eukaryota
- Kingdom: Animalia
- Phylum: Arthropoda
- Class: Insecta
- Order: Hemiptera
- Suborder: Heteroptera
- Family: Rhyparochromidae
- Genus: Taphropeltus
- Species: T. contractus

Binomial name
- Taphropeltus contractus (Herrich-Schäffer, 1835)

= Taphropeltus contractus =

Species of true bug

Taphropeltus contractus is a species in the family Lygaeidae. It is found in the West Palearctic - in Europe, excepting the far North. In the South of Europe the distribution includes the Mediterranean Basin including North Africa. The East limit is the Caucasus. In Central Europe the species is widespread and it is not uncommon in the South. North of the central uplands, it occurs but only locally. The species occurs only in warmer in the Alps. It prefers half shady, dry warm habitats.

This species lives in the litter layer and sucks the seeds of many different types of herbaceous plants and shrubs. At the beginning of the summer when it is the mating season, they are also seen on the plants. The imagines hibernate and pairing starts from May. Nymphs are present in June to Autumn, the new generation of adult bugs appears in August. There is one generation per year.
