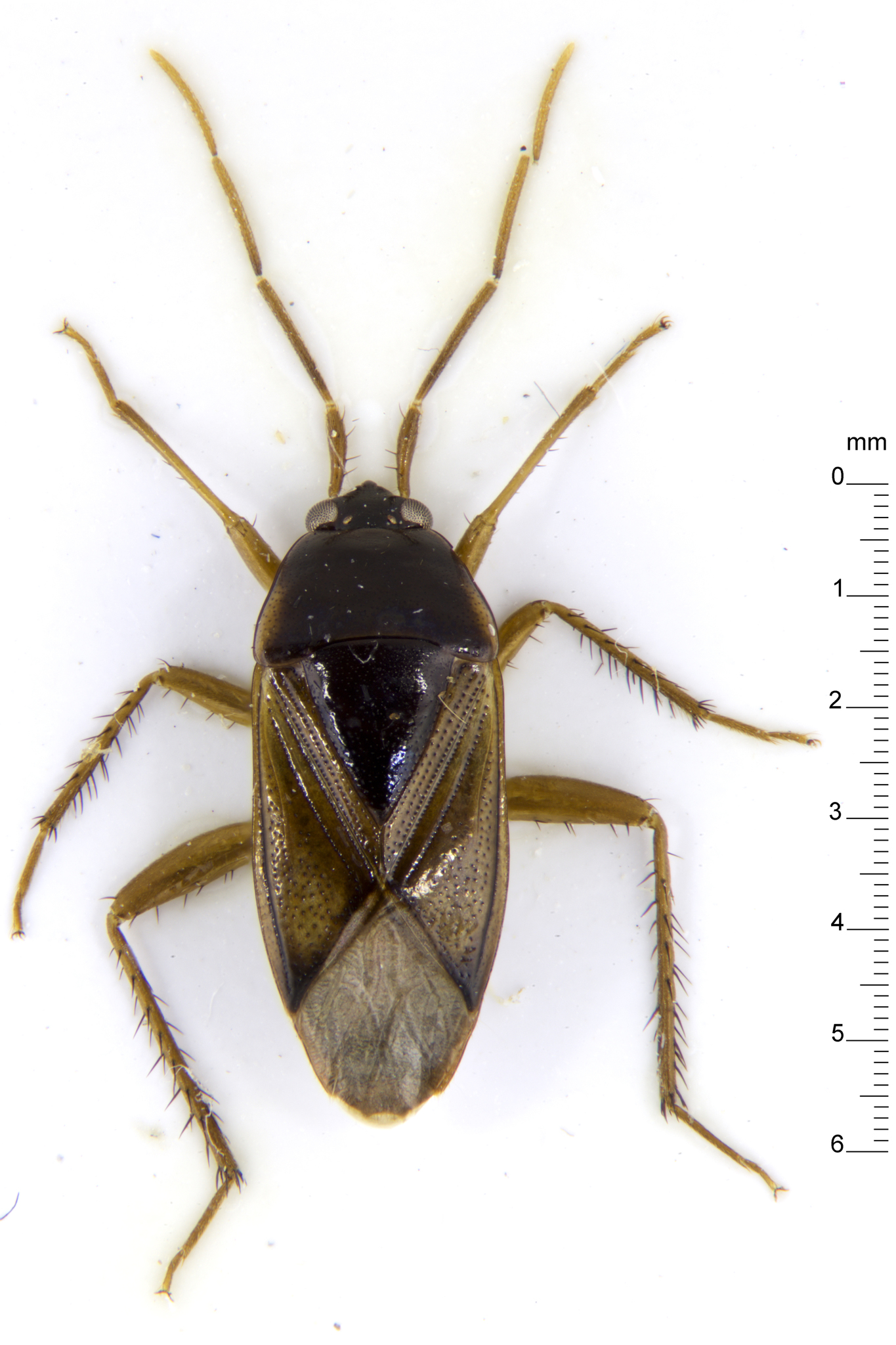
- Kanigara oculata

Scientific classification
- Kingdom: Animalia
- Phylum: Arthropoda
- Clade: Pancrustacea
- Class: Insecta
- Order: Hemiptera
- Suborder: Heteroptera
- Family: Rhyparochromidae
- Subfamily: Rhyparochrominae
- Tribe: Drymini
- Genus: Kanigara; Distant, 1906

= Kanigara =

Genus of true bugs

Kanigara is a genus of Asian seed bugs in the family Rhyparochromidae and tribe Drymini, erected by William Lucas Distant in 1906. The known species distribution appears to be Sri Lanka, Indochina and Malesia through to New Guinea.

== Species ==
The Lygaeoidea Species File includes:

1. Kanigara clypeata (Distant, 1904)
2. Kanigara flavomarginata Distant, 1906 – type species (by original monotypy)
3. Kanigara flavoscuta Scudder, 1969
4. Kanigara fumosa Scudder, 1969
5. Kanigara fusca Scudder, 1969
6. Kanigara nebulosa Ban, 2022
7. Kanigara oculata Scudder, 1969
8. Kanigara punctata Scudder, 1969
9. Kanigara tuberculata Scudder, 1969
10. Kanigara virtuosa Scudder, 1969
