= Thebanus =

Scientific classification
- Kingdom: Animalia
- Phylum: Arthropoda
- Clade: Pancrustacea
- Class: Insecta
- Order: Hemiptera
- Suborder: Heteroptera
- Family: Rhyparochromidae
- Subfamily: Rhyparochrominae
- Tribe: Drymini
- Genus: Thebanus; Distant, 1904

Genus of true bugs

External image
- Images at iNaturalist

Thebanus is a genus of seed bugs in the family Rhyparochromidae and tribe Drymini, erected by William Lucas Distant in 1901. The known species distribution appears to be from India to western Indochina.

== Species ==
The Lygaeoidea Species File includes:

1. Thebanus bengalensis Mukhopadhyay, 1988
2. Thebanus mysorensis (Distant, 1918)
3. Thebanus politus Distant, 1904 - type species - Myanmar
