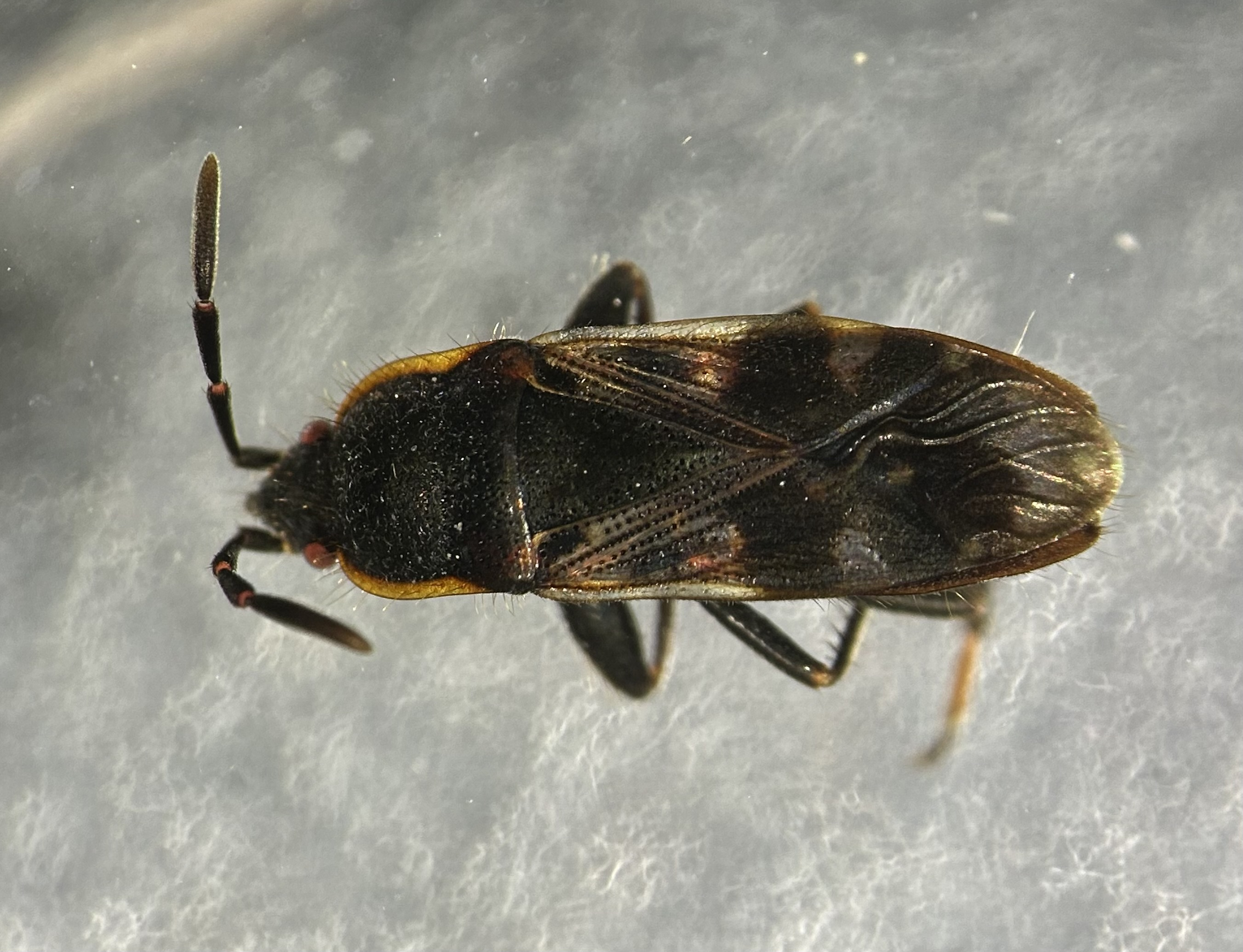
- Lanchnophorus singalensis

Scientific classification
- Domain: Eukaryota
- Kingdom: Animalia
- Phylum: Arthropoda
- Class: Insecta
- Order: Hemiptera
- Suborder: Heteroptera
- Family: Rhyparochromidae
- Subfamily: Rhyparochrominae
- Tribe: Rhyparochromini
- Genus: Lanchnophorus; Reuter, 1887

= Lanchnophorus =

Genus of Hemiptera

Lanchnophorus is a genus of dirt-colored seed bugs in the family Rhyparochromidae. It occurs in Africa, the Middle East and Asia.

== Description ==
Bugs of this genus are oblong and oval in shape. They are covered in dense dark punctures and long dense setae. The antennae are short and often thick. The pronotum is nearly quadrate and has a broad, carinate lateral margin. The hemelytra are either macropterous or slightly abbreviated. The clavus has three rows of punctures.

== Species ==
The following species are included in genus Lanchnophorus:

- Lanchnophorus flavus (Scudder, 1971)
- Lanchnophorus gaoqingae Kment & Jindra, 2017
- Lanchnophorus guttulatus Reuter, 1887
- Lanchnophorus leucospilus (Walker, 1872)
- Lanchnophorus merula (Distant, 1904)
- Lanchnophorus seminitens Kment & Carapezza, 2017
- Lanchnophorus singalensis (Dohrn, 1860)
- Lanchnophorus webbi Kondorosy, 2017
