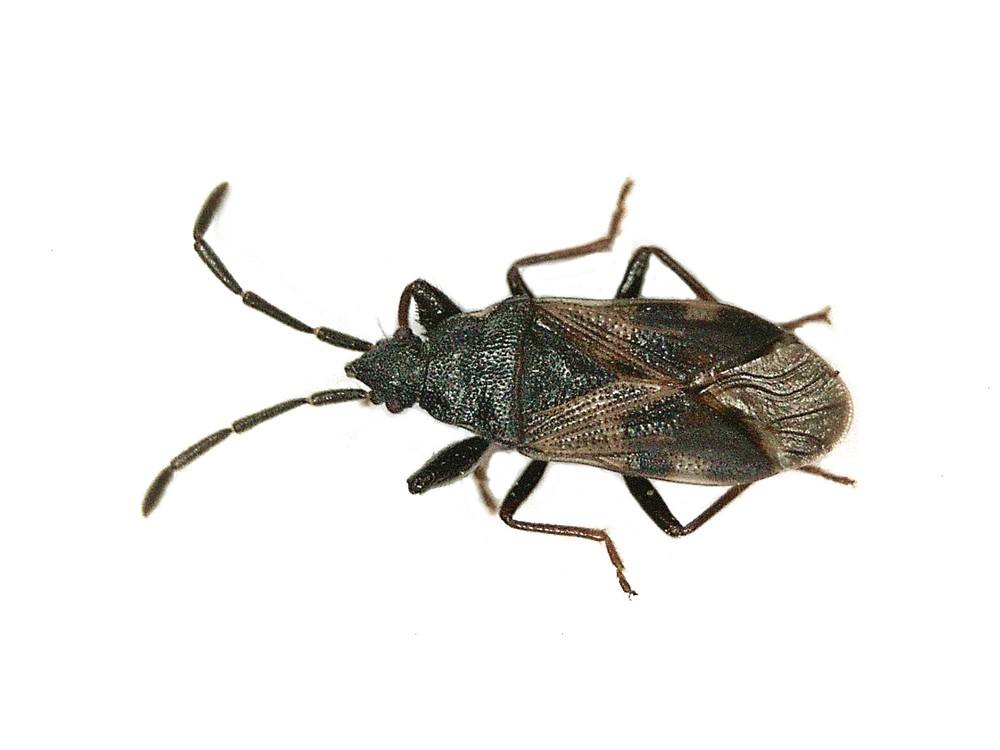
- Taphropeltus contractus

Scientific classification
- Kingdom: Animalia
- Phylum: Arthropoda
- Class: Insecta
- Order: Hemiptera
- Suborder: Heteroptera
- Family: Rhyparochromidae
- Tribe: Drymini
- Genus: Taphropeltus; Stal, 1872

= Taphropeltus =

Genus of true bugs

Taphropeltus is a genus of seed bugs belonging to the family Rhyparochromidae; some species have been placed previously in Notochilus (also in trbe Drymini).

The species of this genus are found in Europe and the Middle East.

== Species ==
The Lygaeoidea Species File includes:

1. Taphropeltus andrei (Puton, 1877)
2. Taphropeltus contractus (Herrich-Schaeffer, 1835)
3. Taphropeltus hamulatus (Thomson, 1870) - type species (by subsequent designation)
4. Taphropeltus nervosus (Fieber, 1861)
5. Taphropeltus ornatus Linnavuori, 1978
