= Orthaea =

Orthaea may refer to:

- Orthaea, mythological Greek character
- Orthaea (bug), a genus of true bugs in the family Rhyparochromidae
- Orthaea (plant), a genus of plants in the family Ericaceae
- Orthaea, a genus of beetles in the family Chrysomelidae, synonym of Euphitrea
