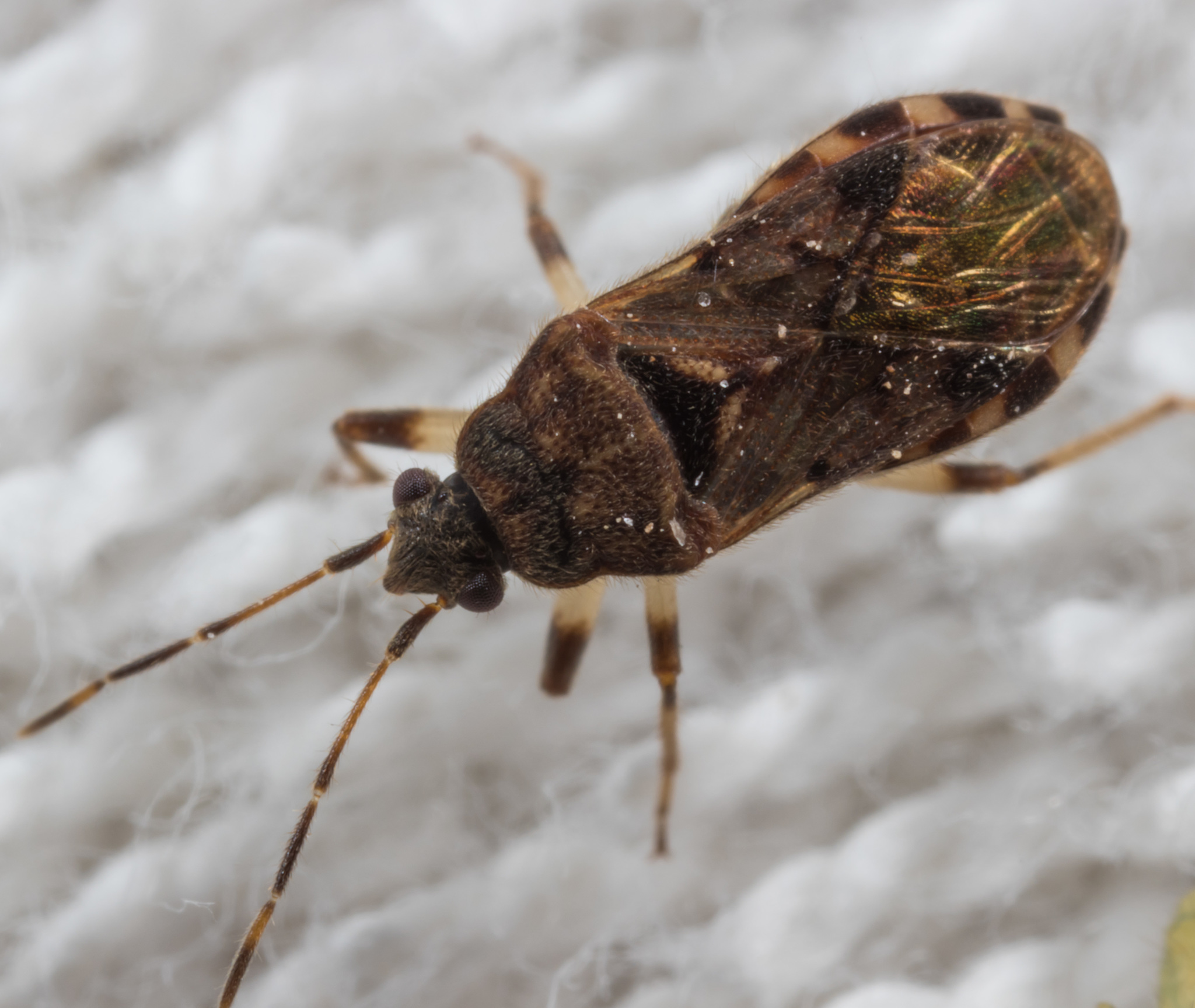
- Trichodrymus pallipes

Scientific classification
- Kingdom: Animalia
- Phylum: Arthropoda
- Class: Insecta
- Order: Hemiptera
- Suborder: Heteroptera
- Family: Rhyparochromidae
- Subfamily: Rhyparochrominae
- Tribe: Drymini
- Genus: Trichodrymus; Lindberg, 1927

Synonyms
- Lachnodrymodes Kiritshenko, 1931

= Trichodrymus =

Genus of true bugs

Trichodrymus is a genus of seed bugs in the family Rhyparochromidae and tribe Drymini, erected by H. Lindberg in 1927. The known species distribution appears to include western Indochina, with other records including eastern China, Taiwan, Korea and Japan.

== Species ==
The Lygaeoidea Species File lists:

1. Trichodrymus major Tomokuni, 1994
2. Trichodrymus majusculus (Distant, 1904) (synonym Lachnodrymodes sikkimensis Kiritshenko, 1931)
3. Trichodrymus pallipes Josifov & Kerzhner, 1978
4. Trichodrymus pameroides Lindberg, 1927 – type species
