= Usilanus =

Scientific classification
- Kingdom: Animalia
- Phylum: Arthropoda
- Clade: Pancrustacea
- Class: Insecta
- Order: Hemiptera
- Suborder: Heteroptera
- Family: Rhyparochromidae
- Subfamily: Rhyparochrominae
- Tribe: Drymini
- Genus: Usilanus; Distant, 1909

Genus of true bugs

External image
- Images at iNaturalist

Usilanus is a genus of Asian seed bugs in the family Rhyparochromidae and tribe Drymini, erected by William Lucas Distant in 1901. The known species distribution appears to include Indochina.

== Species ==
The Lygaeoidea Species File includes:

1. Usilanus burmanicus Distant, 1909 – type species (by subsequent designation)
2. Usilanus pictus (Distant, 1918) - Laos
