= Acompus =

Scientific classification
- Domain: Eukaryota
- Kingdom: Animalia
- Phylum: Arthropoda
- Class: Insecta
- Order: Hemiptera
- Suborder: Heteroptera
- Family: Rhyparochromidae
- Subfamily: Rhyparochrominae
- Tribe: Stygnocorini
- Genus: Acompus; Fieber, 1861

Genus of true bugs

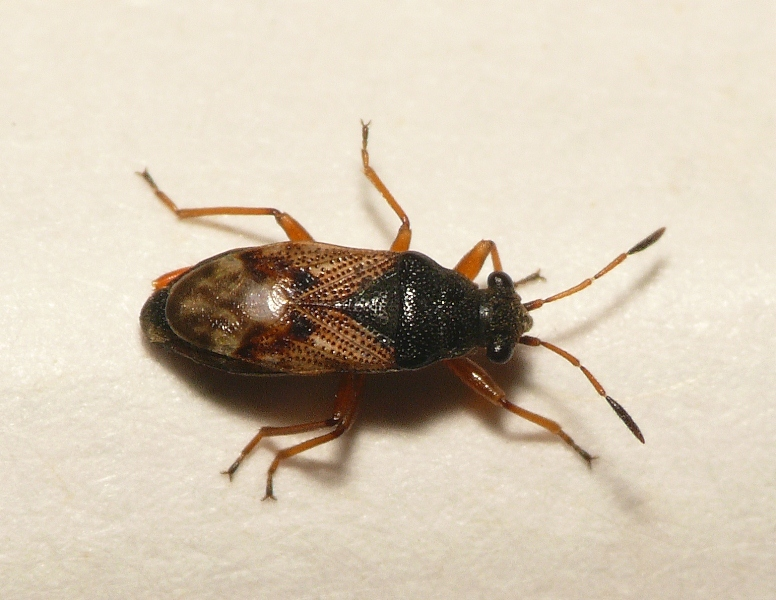
An image of Acompus rufipes

Acompus is a genus of true bugs belonging to the family Rhyparochromidae.

The genus was first described by Fieber in 1861.

The species of this genus are found in Europe.

Species:

- Acompus laticeps Ribaut, 1929
- Acompus pallipes (G.H.W.Herrich-Schaeffer, 1835)
- Acompus rufipes (Wolff, 1802)
