= Thylochromus =

Scientific classification
- Kingdom: Animalia
- Phylum: Arthropoda
- Class: Insecta
- Order: Hemiptera
- Suborder: Heteroptera
- Family: Rhyparochromidae
- Tribe: Drymini
- Genus: Thylochromus; Barber, 1928
- Species: T. nitidulus

Binomial name
- Thylochromus nitidulus Barber, 1928

Genus of true bugs

Thylochromus is a genus of seed bugs in the family Rhyparochromidae from western North America. There is one described species in Thylochromus, T. nitidulus.
