= Notochilus =

Scientific classification
- Domain: Eukaryota
- Kingdom: Animalia
- Phylum: Arthropoda
- Class: Insecta
- Order: Hemiptera
- Suborder: Heteroptera
- Family: Rhyparochromidae
- Subfamily: Rhyparochrominae
- Tribe: Drymini
- Genus: Notochilus; Fieber, 1864

Synonyms
- Ribauticoris Stichel, 1958

Genus of true bugs

Notochilus is a genus of mostly European bugs in the tribe Drymini (family Rhyparochromidae), erected by Franz Xaver Fieber in 1864. The species Notochilus limbatus is recorded from northern Europe including the British Isles.

== Species ==
The Lygaeoidea Species File lists:

1. Notochilus crassicornis (Baerensprung, 1858)
2. Notochilus damryi Puton, 1871
3. Notochilus ferrugineus (Mulsant & Rey, 1852)
  - type species (as Pachymerus ferrugineus Mulsant, E. & C. Rey)
4. Notochilus limbatus Fieber, 1870

== See also ==
- List of heteropteran bugs recorded in Britain
