= Atrazonotus =

Scientific classification
- Domain: Eukaryota
- Kingdom: Animalia
- Phylum: Arthropoda
- Class: Insecta
- Order: Hemiptera
- Suborder: Heteroptera
- Family: Rhyparochromidae
- Tribe: Gonianotini
- Genus: Atrazonotus; Slater & Ashlock, 1966
- Species: A. umbrosus

Binomial name
- Atrazonotus umbrosus (Distant, 1893)

Genus of true bugs

Atrazonotus is a genus of dirt-colored seed bugs in the family Rhyparochromidae. There is one described species in Atrazonotus, A. umbrosus.
