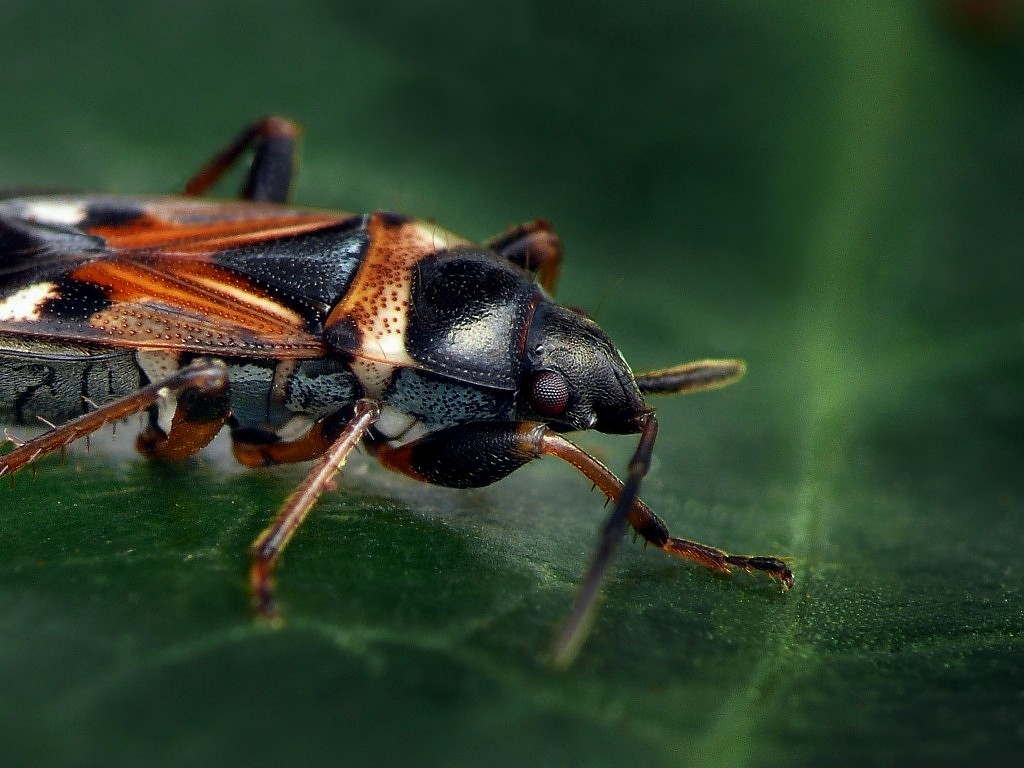
- Raglius alboacuminatus

Scientific classification
- Kingdom: Animalia
- Phylum: Arthropoda
- Class: Insecta
- Order: Hemiptera
- Suborder: Heteroptera
- Family: Rhyparochromidae
- Subfamily: Rhyparochrominae
- Tribe: Rhyparochromini; Amyot & Serville, 1843

= Rhyparochromini =

Tribe of true bugs

Rhyparochromini is a tribe of dirt-colored seed bugs in the family Rhyparochromidae. There are more than 40 genera and 360 described species in this tribe.

Rhyparochromini is the most diverse tribe of the family. It is most diverse in the Afrotropical, Palearctic and Oriental regions.

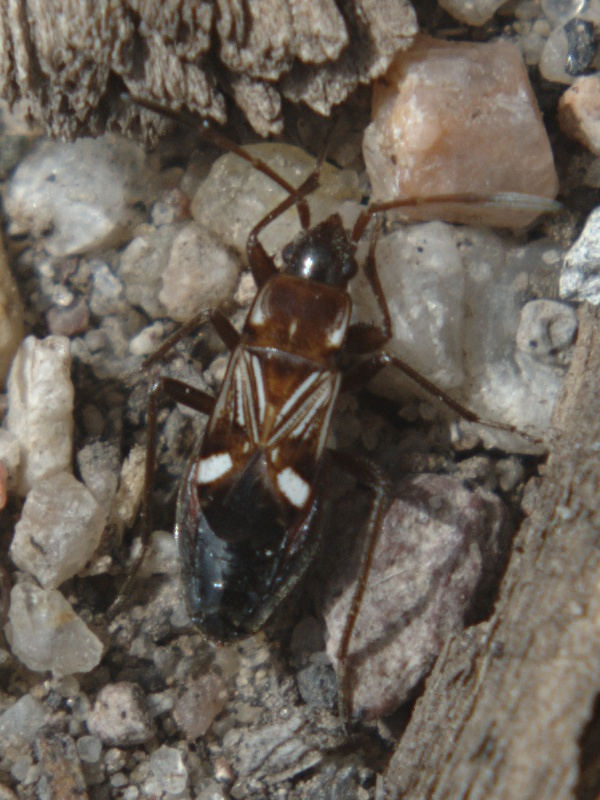
Uhleriola floralis

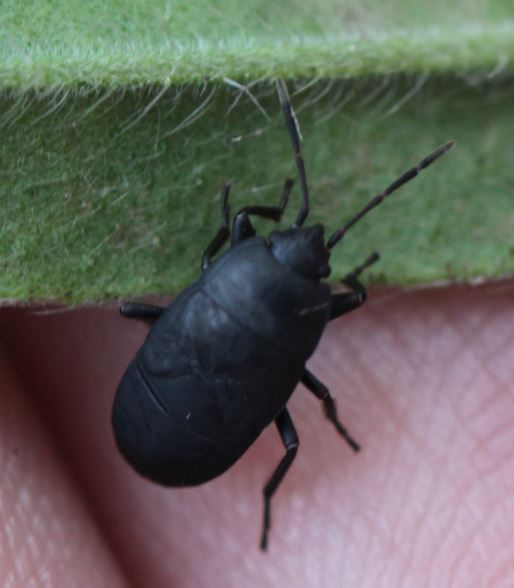
Aellopus atratus

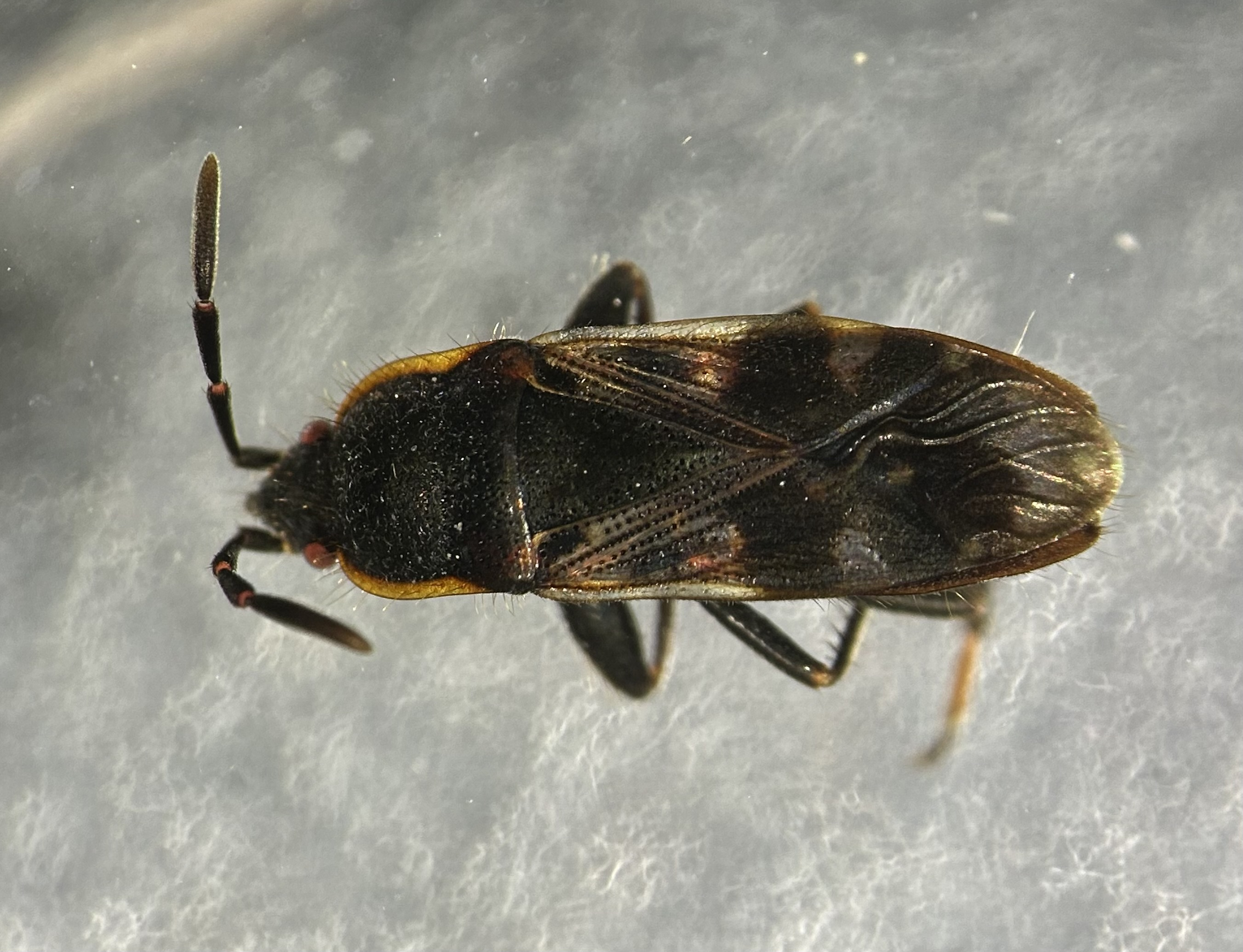
Lanchnophorus singalensis

== Genera ==
These 47 genera belong to the tribe Rhyparochromini:

- Acroraglius Wagner, 1961
- Aellopideus Seidenstucker, 1963
- Aellopus Wolff, 1802
- Altomarus Distant, 1903
- Beosus Amyot & Serville, 1843
- Callistonotus Horvath, 1906
- Caprochromus Scudder, 1968
- Caridops Bergroth, 1894
- Cordillonotus Scudder, 1984
- Cyrtocnemodon Eyles & Scudder, 1968
- Dieuches Dohrn, 1860
- Distadieuches Scudder, 1968
- Ectyphoscelus Eyles, 1968
- Elasmolomus Stal, 1872
- Graphoraglius Wagner, 1961
- Graptopeltus Stal, 1872
- Lanchnophorus Reuter, 1887
- Liolobus Reuter, 1885
- Metadieuches Distant, 1918
- Metochus Scott, 1874
- Microtomideus Reuter, 1885
- Naphiellus Scudder, 1962
- Naphius Stal, 1874
- Narbo Stal, 1865
- Naudarensia Distant, 1904
- Nocellochromus Scudder, 1963
- Orieotrechus Scudder, 1962
- Orphnotrechus Sweet, 1991
- Panaorus Kiritshenko, 1951
- Perimeda Reuter, 1887
- Peritrechus Fieber, 1861
- Phorcinus Stal, 1874
- Plinthurgus Kiritshenko, 1911
- Poeantius Stal, 1865
- Quiobbesus Scudder, 1968
- Ragliodes Reuter, 1885
- Raglius Stal, 1872
- Rhyparochromus Hahn, 1826
- Rhyparoclava Kment, Hemala & BaŇar, 2016
- Rhyparothesus Scudder, 1962
- Rollathemus Scudder, 1963
- Scudderocoris Dellapé, Melo, Montemayor & Kondorosy, 2017
- Stizocephalus Eyles, 1970
- Trichaphanus Kiritshenko, 1926
- Uhleriola Horvath, 1908
- Xanthochilus Stål, 1872
- † Prolygaeus Scudder, 1890
