= Carvalhodrymus =

Scientific classification
- Kingdom: Animalia
- Phylum: Arthropoda
- Class: Insecta
- Order: Hemiptera
- Suborder: Heteroptera
- Family: Rhyparochromidae
- Tribe: Drymini
- Genus: Carvalhodrymus; Slater, 1995

Species
- Carvalhodrymus elegans Slater, 1995 (type)

Genus of true bugs

Carvalhodrymus is a genus of bugs in the family Rhyparochromidae. the type species, C. elegans, is found in Ghana and Cameroon.
