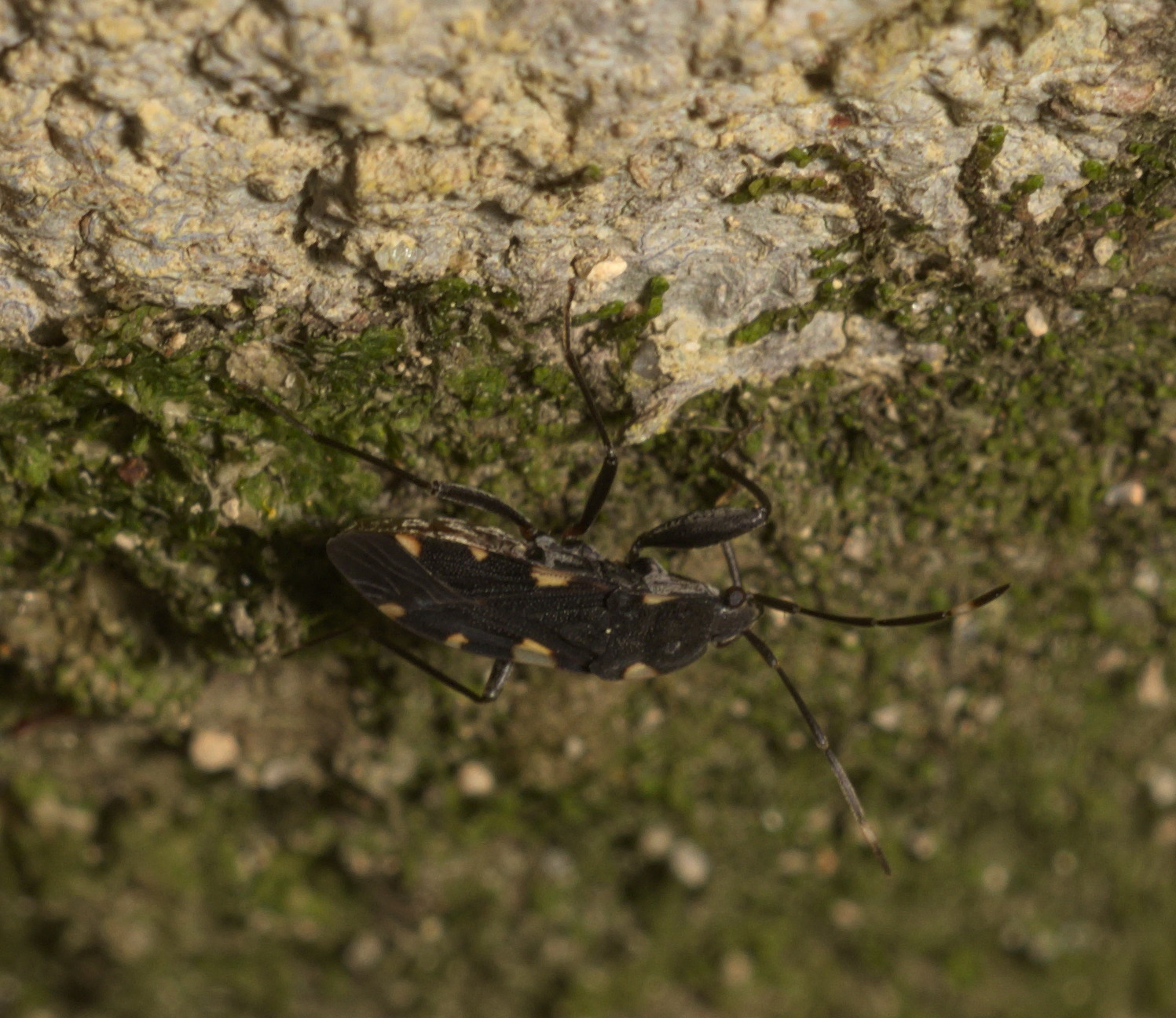
- In Hong Kong

Scientific classification
- Kingdom: Animalia
- Phylum: Arthropoda
- Clade: Pancrustacea
- Class: Insecta
- Order: Hemiptera
- Suborder: Heteroptera
- Family: Rhyparochromidae
- Tribe: Drymini
- Genus: Potamiaena; Distant, 1910
- Species: P. aurifera

Binomial name
- Potamiaena aurifera Distant, 1910

= Potamiaena aurifera =

Species of bug

Potamiaena genus of seed bugs in the tribe Drymini (family Rhyparochromidae), erected by William Lucas Distant in 1910. There is a single species: Potamiaena aurifera, found in India and Southeast Asia.
