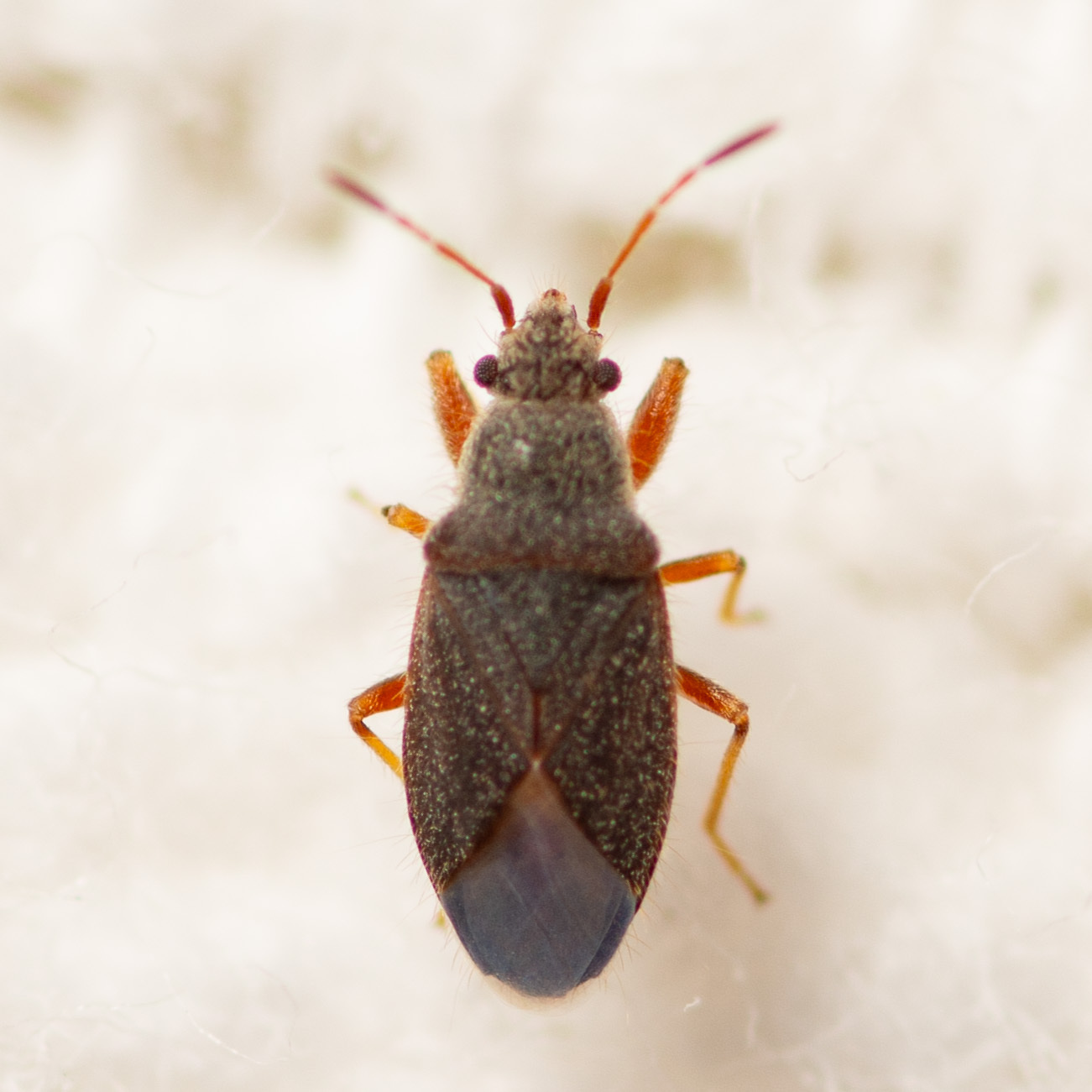

Scientific classification
- Kingdom: Animalia
- Phylum: Arthropoda
- Class: Insecta
- Order: Hemiptera
- Suborder: Heteroptera
- Family: Rhyparochromidae
- Genus: Valonetus; Barber, 1918
- Species: V. puberulus

Binomial name
- Valonetus puberulus (Stal, 1874)

Synonyms
- Plociomera puberula Stal, 1874; Ptochiomera puberula (Stal, 1874); Sisamnes puberula (Stal, 1874); Valonetus pilosus Barber, 1918

= Valonetus =

Genus of true bugs

Valonetus is a genus of dirt-colored seed bugs in the family Rhyparochromidae. It is monotypic, being represented by the single species Valonetus puberulus.
