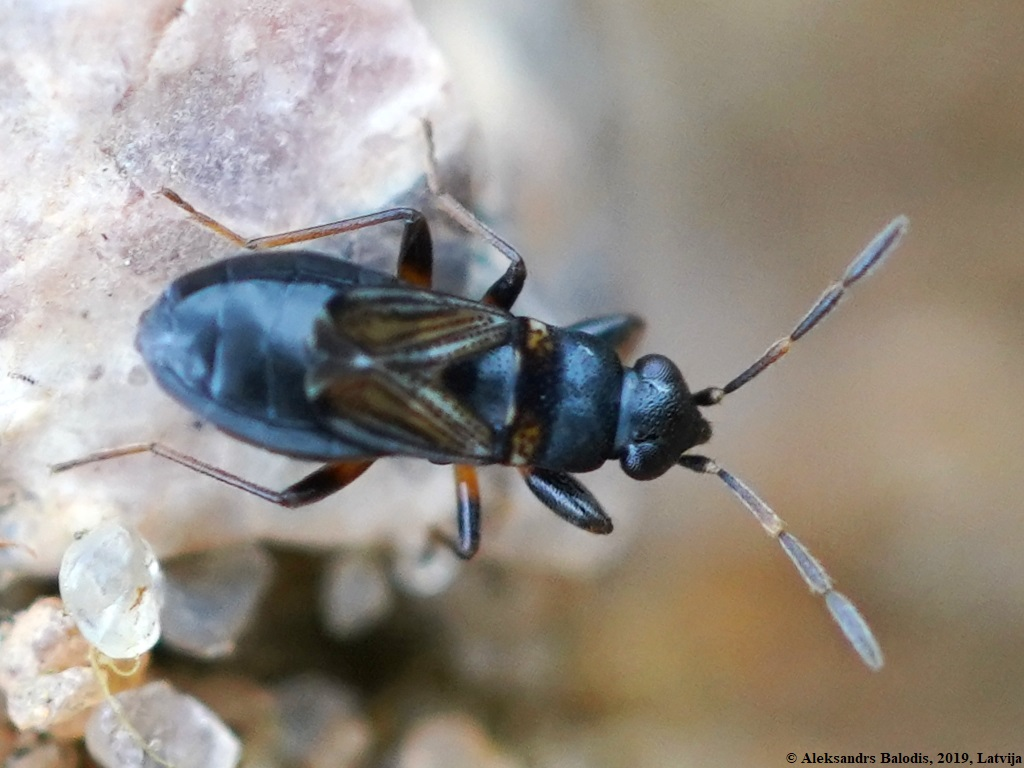
- Ischnocoris angustulus

Scientific classification
- Domain: Eukaryota
- Kingdom: Animalia
- Phylum: Arthropoda
- Class: Insecta
- Order: Hemiptera
- Suborder: Heteroptera
- Family: Rhyparochromidae
- Tribe: Drymini
- Genus: Ischnocoris; Fieber, 1861

= Ischnocoris =

Genus of true bugs

Ischnocoris is a genus of true bugs belonging to the family Rhyparochromidae.

The species of this genus are found in Europe.

Species:

- Ischnocoris angustulus (Boheman, 1852)
- Ischnocoris bureschi Josifov, 1976
