= Seed bug =

The term seed bug can refer to several different true bugs. The term describes these bugs by their diet, seeds of various kinds of seed plant.

Listed by taxonomic rank below Insecta, a class:

- Hemiptera (order)
  - Pentatomomorpha (infraorder)
    - Lygaeoidea (superfamily)
      - Lygaeidae (family)
        - various genera
          - various species
      - Rhyparochromidae (family)
        - various genera
          - various species
    - Coreoidea (superfamily)
      - Coreidae (family)
        - Leptoglossus (genus)
          - Leptoglossus occidentalis, the "western conifer seed bug"
