= Phasmosomus =

Scientific classification
- Domain: Eukaryota
- Kingdom: Animalia
- Phylum: Arthropoda
- Class: Insecta
- Order: Hemiptera
- Suborder: Heteroptera
- Family: Rhyparochromidae
- Subfamily: Rhyparochrominae
- Tribe: Phasmosomini
- Genus: Phasmosomus; Kiritshenko, 1938

Genus of true bugs

Phasmosomus is a genus of dirt-colored seed bugs in the family Rhyparochromidae, the sole genus in the tribe Phasmosomini. There are at least two described species in Phasmosomus.

== Species ==
These two species belong to the genus Phasmosomus:

- Phasmosomus araxis Kiritshenko, 1938
- Phasmosomus priesneri (Wagner, 1958)
