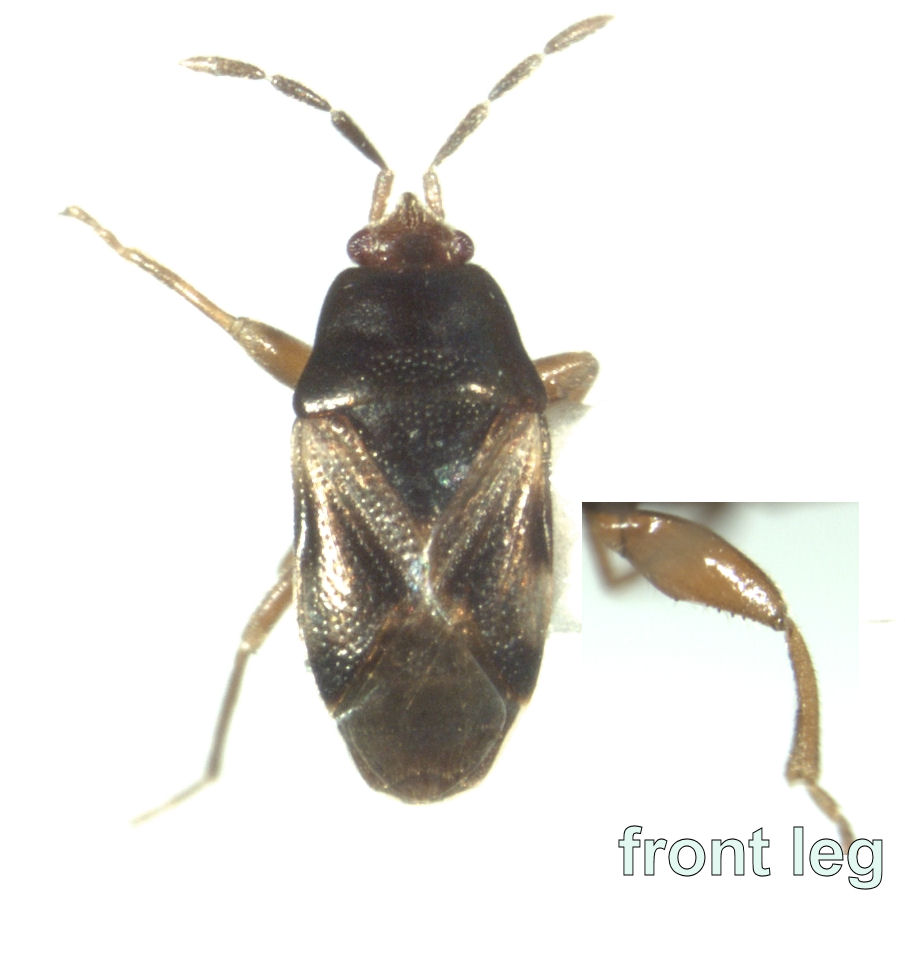

Scientific classification
- Domain: Eukaryota
- Kingdom: Animalia
- Phylum: Arthropoda
- Class: Insecta
- Order: Hemiptera
- Suborder: Heteroptera
- Family: Rhyparochromidae
- Subfamily: Rhyparochrominae
- Tribe: Targaremini

= Targaremini =

Tribe of true bugs

Targaremini is a tribe of dirt-colored seed bugs in the family Rhyparochromidae. There are more than 20 genera and 50 described species in Targaremini.

== Genera ==
These 22 genera belong to the tribe Targaremini:

- Australotarma Woodward, 1978
- Baladeana Distant, 1914
- Calotargemus Scudder, 1978
- Forsterocoris Woodward, 1953
- Geratarma Malipatil, 1977
- Hebrolethaeus Scudder, 1962
- Lachnophoroides Distant, 1914
- Metagerra White, 1878
- Millerocoris Eyles, 1967
- Mirrhina Distant, 1920
- Paramirrhina Malipatil, 1983
- Paratruncala Malipatil, 1977
- Popondetta Woodward, 1978
- Regatarma Woodward, 1953
- Ruavatua Miller, 1956
- Sylvacligenes Scudder, 1962
- Targarema White, 1878
- Targarops Woodward, 1978
- Truncala Woodward, 1953
- Truncaloides Woodward, 1978
- Trypetocoris Woodward, 1953
- Woodwardiana Malipatil, 1977
