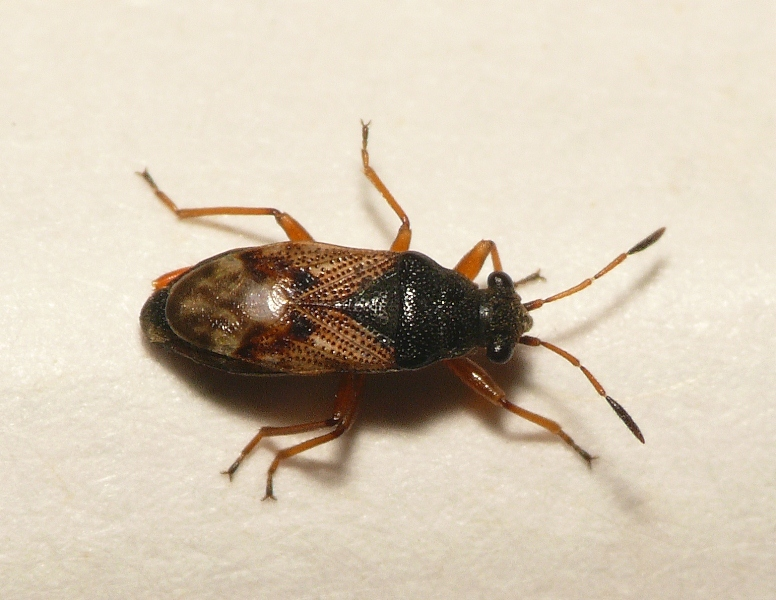
- Acompus rufipes

Scientific classification
- Domain: Eukaryota
- Kingdom: Animalia
- Phylum: Arthropoda
- Class: Insecta
- Order: Hemiptera
- Suborder: Heteroptera
- Family: Rhyparochromidae
- Subfamily: Rhyparochrominae
- Tribe: Stygnocorini

= Stygnocorini =

Tribe of true bugs

Stygnocorini is a tribe of dirt-colored seed bugs in the family Rhyparochromidae. There are about 14 genera and more than 60 described species in Stygnocorini.

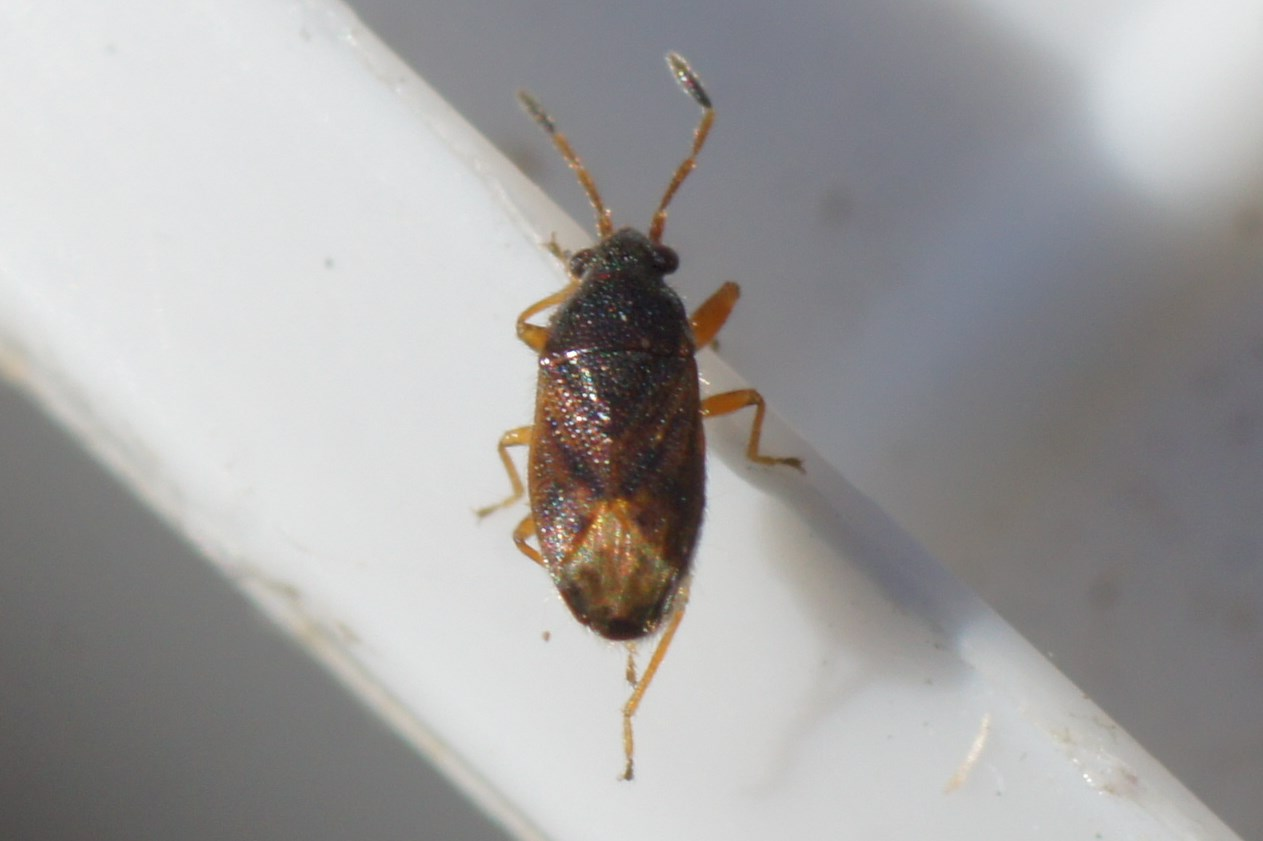
Stygnocoris sabulosus

== Genera ==
These 14 genera belong to the tribe Stygnocorini:

- Acompus Fieber, 1861
- Anneckocoris Slater, 1982
- Arrianus Distant, 1904
- Capenicola Slater & Sweet, 1970
- Esuridea Reuter, 1890
- Hyalochilus Fieber, 1861
- Lasiosomus Fieber, 1861
- Margareta White, 1878
- Notiocola Slater & Sweet, 1970
- Paracnemodus Slater, 1964
- Stygnocoris Douglas & Scott, 1865
- Stygnocorisella Hoberlandt, 1956
- Sweetocoris O'Rourke, 1974
- Tasmanicola Slater & Sweet, 1970
