= Pionosomus =

Scientific classification
- Domain: Eukaryota
- Kingdom: Animalia
- Phylum: Arthropoda
- Class: Insecta
- Order: Hemiptera
- Suborder: Heteroptera
- Family: Rhyparochromidae
- Genus: Pionosomus; Fieber, 1861

Genus of true bugs

Pionosomus is a genus of true bugs belonging to the family Rhyparochromidae.

The species of this genus are found in Europe.

Species:

- Pionosomus abha Linnavuori, 1986
- Pionosomus alticolus Lindberg, 1953
