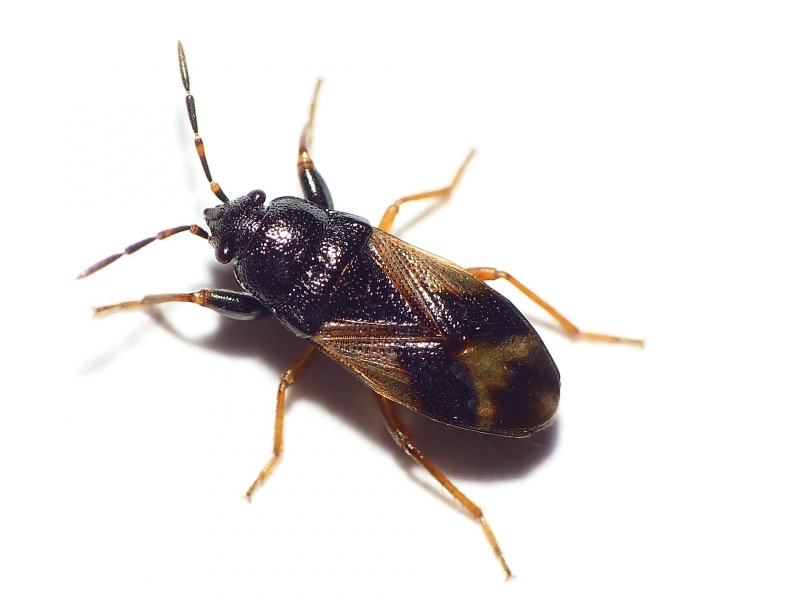
- Megalonotus praetextatus

Scientific classification
- Domain: Eukaryota
- Kingdom: Animalia
- Phylum: Arthropoda
- Class: Insecta
- Order: Hemiptera
- Suborder: Heteroptera
- Family: Rhyparochromidae
- Subfamily: Rhyparochrominae
- Tribe: Megalonotini

= Megalonotini =

Tribe of true bugs

Megalonotini is a tribe of dirt-colored seed bugs in the family Rhyparochromidae. There are about 19 genera and more than 80 described species in Megalonotini.

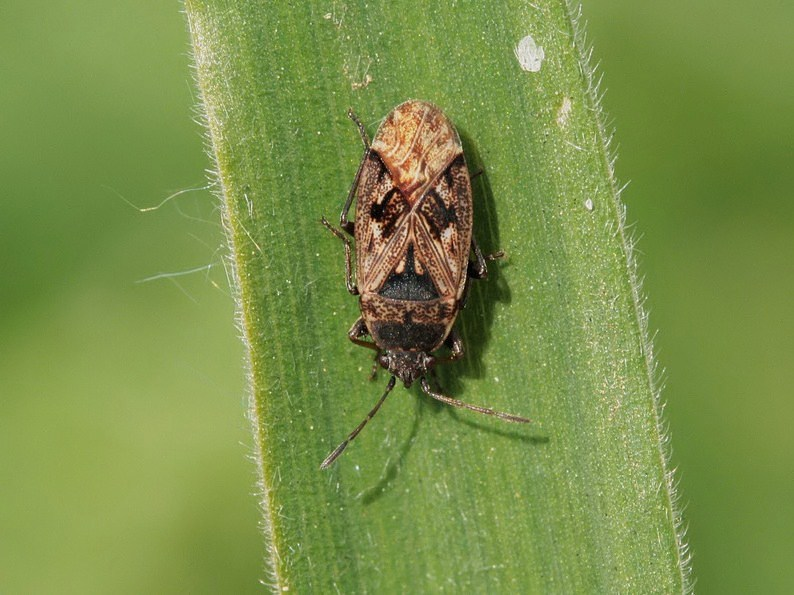
Sphragisticus nebulosus

== Genera ==
These 21 genera belong to the tribe Megalonotini:

- Afralampes Slater, 1998
- Allocentrum Bergroth, 1894
- Anepsiocoris Puton, 1886
- Anepsiodes Reuter, 1882
- Dermatinoides Slater & Sweet, 1973
- Hadrocnemis Jakovlev, 1881
- Hispanocoris Costas & Vázquez, 1999
- Icus Fieber, 1861
- Lamprodema Fieber, 1861
- Lasiocoris Fieber, 1861
- Leptomelus Jakovlev, 1881
- Megalonotus Fieber, 1861
- Metastenothorax Reuter, 1884
- Microthisus Lindberg, 1958
- Pezocoris Jakovlev, 1875
- Piezoscelis Fieber, 1870
- Polycrates Stal, 1865
- Proderus Fieber, 1861
- Sphragisticus Stal, 1872
- Tempereocoris Pericart, 1995
- Tethallotrum Scudder, 1962
