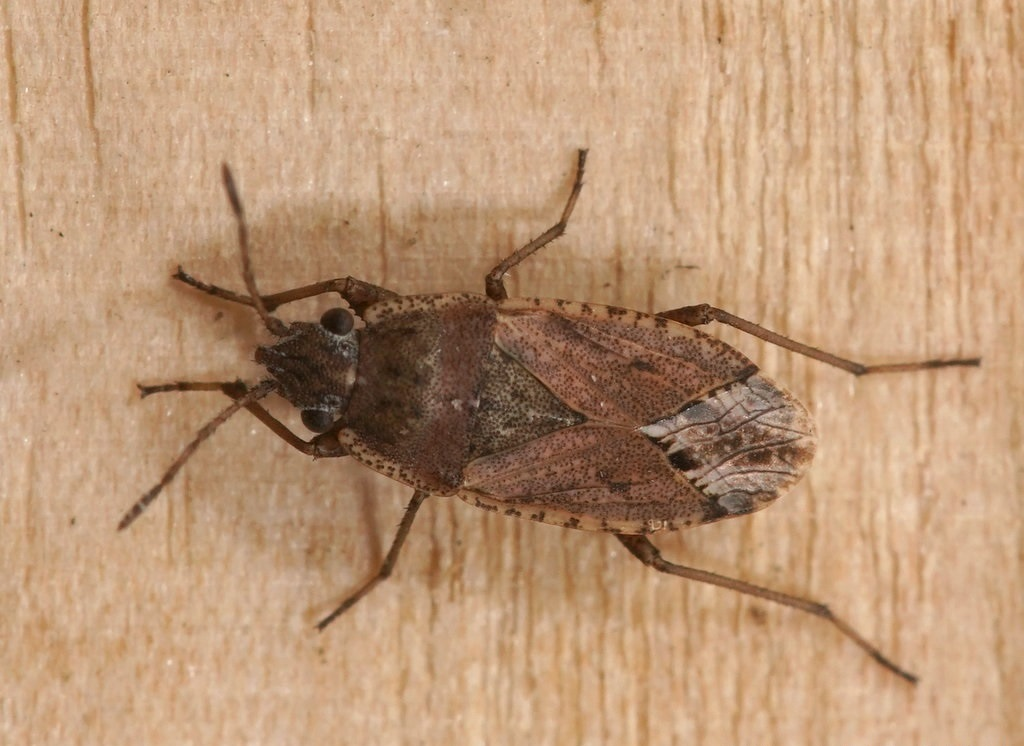
- Gonianotus marginepunctatus

Scientific classification
- Domain: Eukaryota
- Kingdom: Animalia
- Phylum: Arthropoda
- Class: Insecta
- Order: Hemiptera
- Suborder: Heteroptera
- Family: Rhyparochromidae
- Genus: Gonianotus; Fieber, 1861

= Gonianotus =

Genus of true bugs

Gonianotus is a genus of true bugs belonging to the family Rhyparochromidae.

The species of this genus are found in Europe.

Species:

- Gonianotus angusticollis Linnavuori, 1953
- Gonianotus barbarus Montandon, 1890
