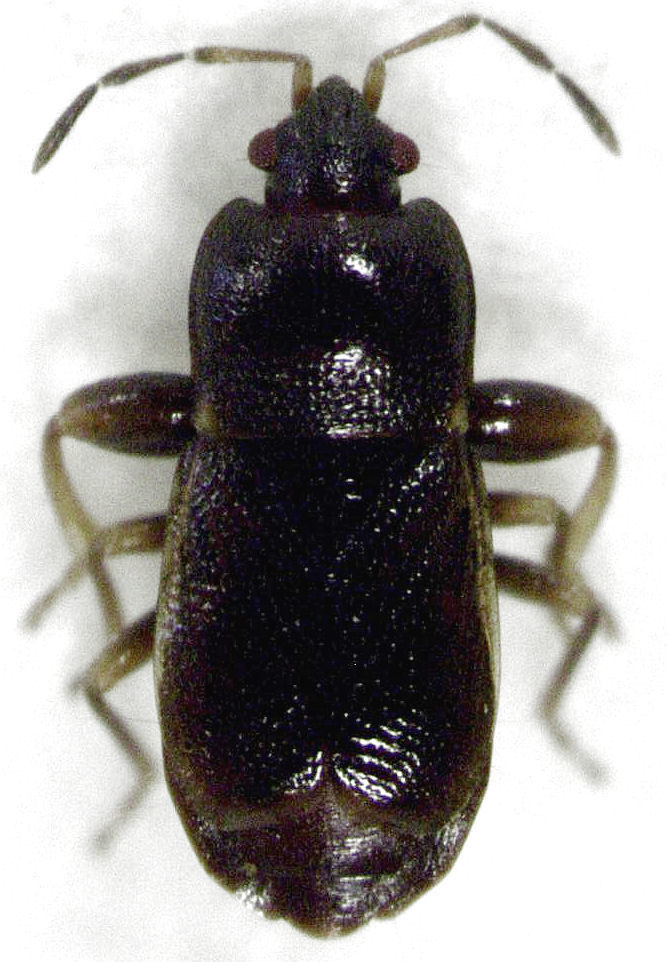
- Plinthisus woodwardi

Scientific classification
- Domain: Eukaryota
- Kingdom: Animalia
- Phylum: Arthropoda
- Class: Insecta
- Order: Hemiptera
- Suborder: Heteroptera
- Family: Rhyparochromidae
- Subfamily: Plinthisinae

Genera
- Bosbequius Distant, 1904; Plinthisus Stephens, 1829

= Plinthisinae =

Subfamily of true bugs

Plinthisinae is a subfamily of dirt-colored seed bugs in the family Rhyparochromidae, containing only two genera. Bosbequius is monotypic genus with the single species Bosbequius latus. The other, Plinthisus, has more than 100 species.
