= Lilliputocoris =

Scientific classification
- Kingdom: Animalia
- Phylum: Arthropoda
- Class: Insecta
- Order: Hemiptera
- Suborder: Heteroptera
- Family: Rhyparochromidae
- Subfamily: Rhyparochrominae
- Tribe: Lilliputocorini
- Genus: Lilliputocoris; Slater & Woodward, 1979

Genus of true bugs

Lilliputocoris is a genus of dirt-colored seed bugs in the family Rhyparochromidae, the sole genus in the tribe Lilliputocorini. There are about 10 described species in Lilliputocoris, recorded from Africa, southern Asia through to Australia.

== Species ==
These species belong to the genus Lilliputocoris:

- Lilliputocoris coatoni Slater, 1994
- Lilliputocoris exiguus Slater, 1979
- Lilliputocoris ghanaensis Slater & Woodward, 1982
- Lilliputocoris grossocerata Slater & Woodward, 1982
- Lilliputocoris neotropicalis Slater & Woodward, 1982
- Lilliputocoris punctatus (Woodward, 1959)
- Lilliputocoris seychellensis Slater & Woodward, 1982
- Lilliputocoris slateri Stys, 1987
- Lilliputocoris taylori Slater & Woodward, 1982
- Lilliputocoris terraereginae Slater & Woodward, 1982
