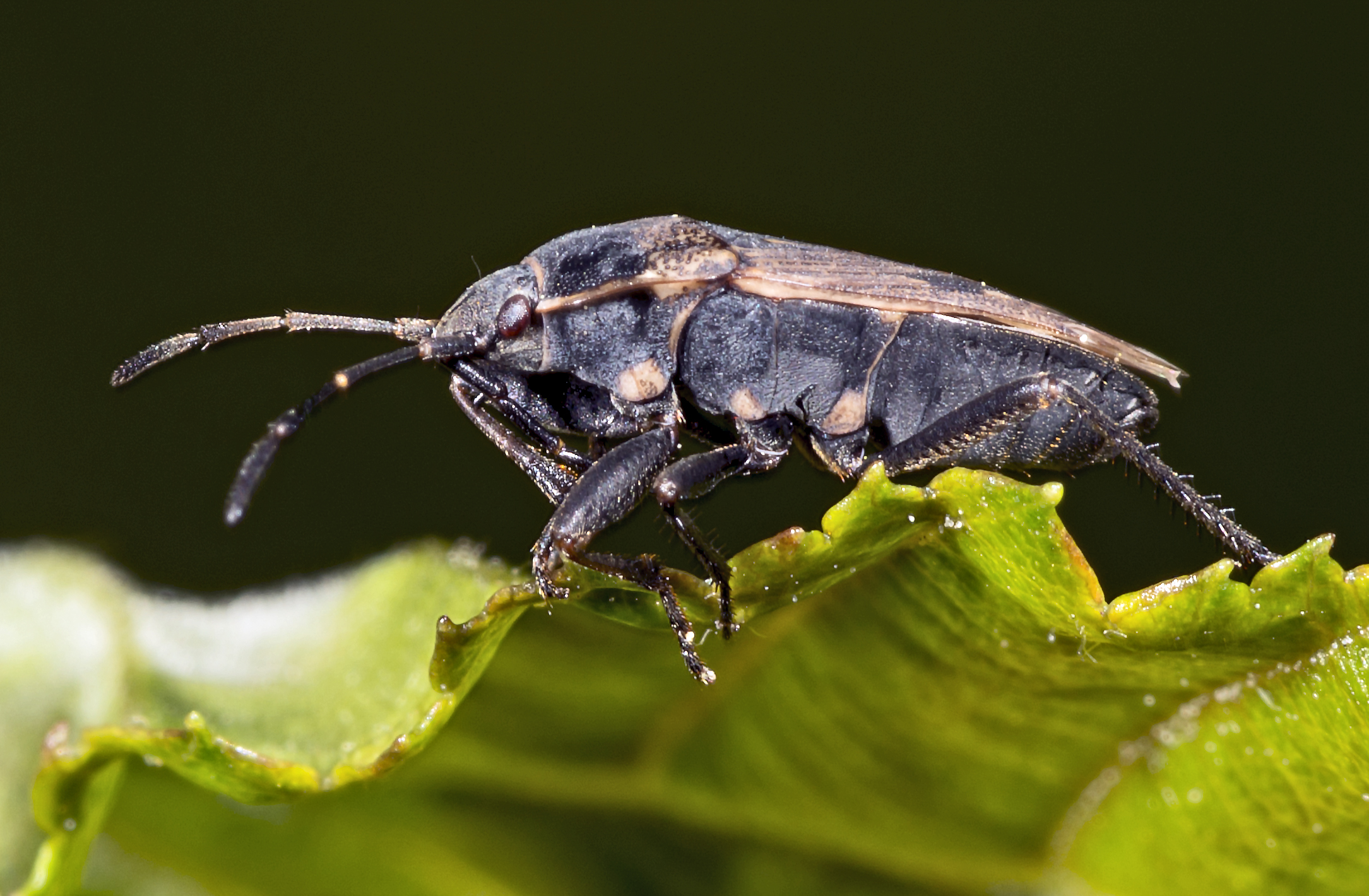
- Graptopeltus lynceus, side view

Scientific classification
- Kingdom: Animalia
- Phylum: Arthropoda
- Class: Insecta
- Order: Hemiptera
- Suborder: Heteroptera
- Family: Rhyparochromidae
- Genus: Graptopeltus; Stal, 1872

= Graptopeltus =

Genus of true bugs

Graptopeltus is a genus of true bugs belonging to the family Rhyparochromidae.

The species of this genus are found in Europe.

Species:

- Graptopeltus consors (Horvath, 1878)
- Graptopeltus filicornis (Bergroth, 1894)
