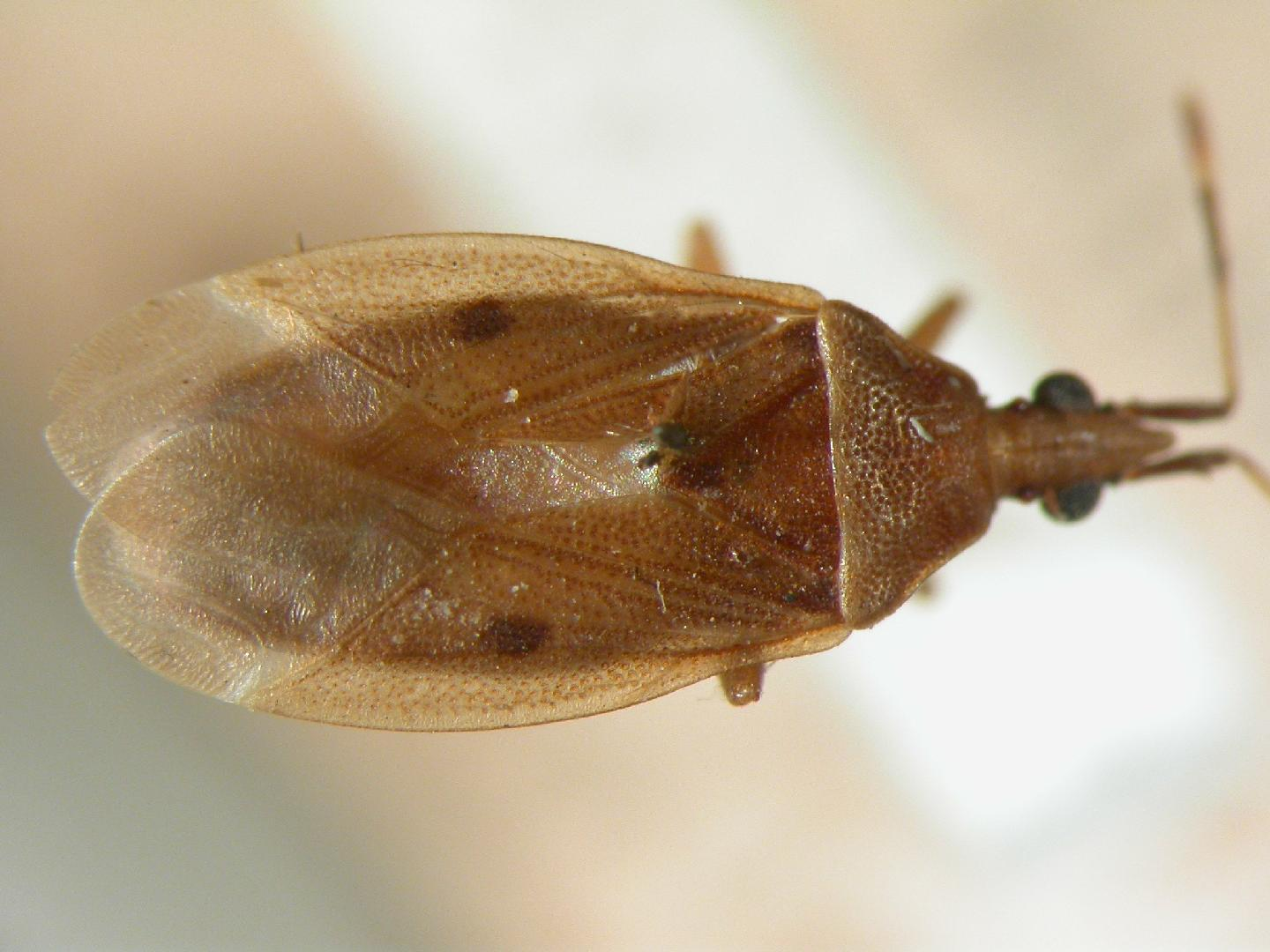
- Clerada bipunctata

Scientific classification
- Domain: Eukaryota
- Kingdom: Animalia
- Phylum: Arthropoda
- Class: Insecta
- Order: Hemiptera
- Suborder: Heteroptera
- Family: Rhyparochromidae
- Subfamily: Rhyparochrominae
- Tribe: Cleradini

= Cleradini =

Tribe of true bugs

Cleradini is a tribe of dirt-colored seed bugs in the family Rhyparochromidae. There are about 19 genera and more than 50 described species in Cleradini.

== Genera ==
These 19 genera belong to the tribe Cleradini:

- Arcleda Malipatil, 1981
- Austroclerada Malipatil, 1981
- Clerada Signoret, 1863
- Clerocarbus Scudder, 1969
- Dendezia Scudder, 1963
- Dyakana Distant, 1906
- Harmostica Bergroth, 1918
- Kanadyana Scudder, 1963
- Laticlerada Malipatil, 1981
- Mahisa Distant, 1906
- Navarrus Distant, 1901
- Neoclerada Malipatil, 1981
- Pactye Stal, 1865
- Panchaea Stal, 1865
- Paramahisa Malipatil, 1981
- Parapactye Malipatil, 1983
- Pholeolygaeus Deboutteville & Paulian, 1952
- Prehensocoris Harrington, 1988
- Reclada White, 1878
