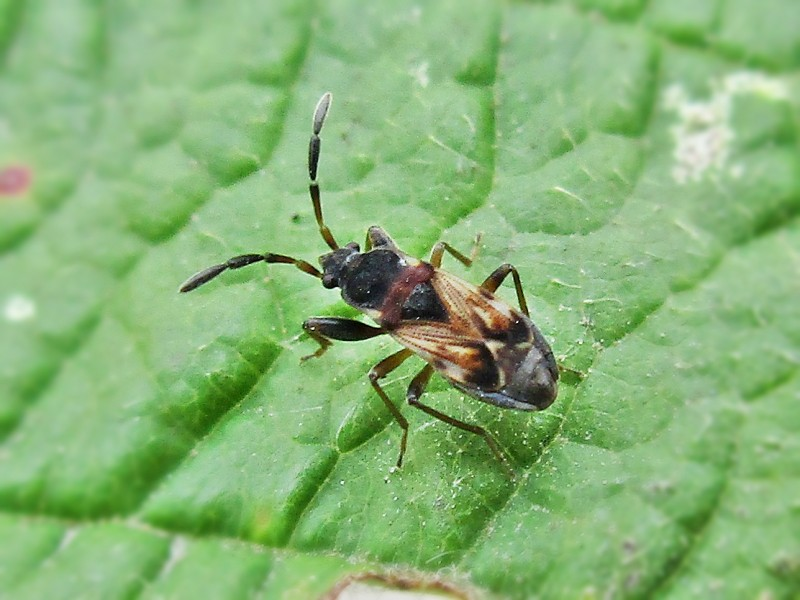
- Scolopostethus thomsoni

Scientific classification
- Kingdom: Animalia
- Phylum: Arthropoda
- Class: Insecta
- Order: Hemiptera
- Suborder: Heteroptera
- Family: Rhyparochromidae
- Subfamily: Rhyparochrominae
- Tribe: Drymini

= Drymini =

Tribe of true bugs

Drymini is a tribe of seed bugs in the family Rhyparochromidae. There are more than 300 described species in Drymini.

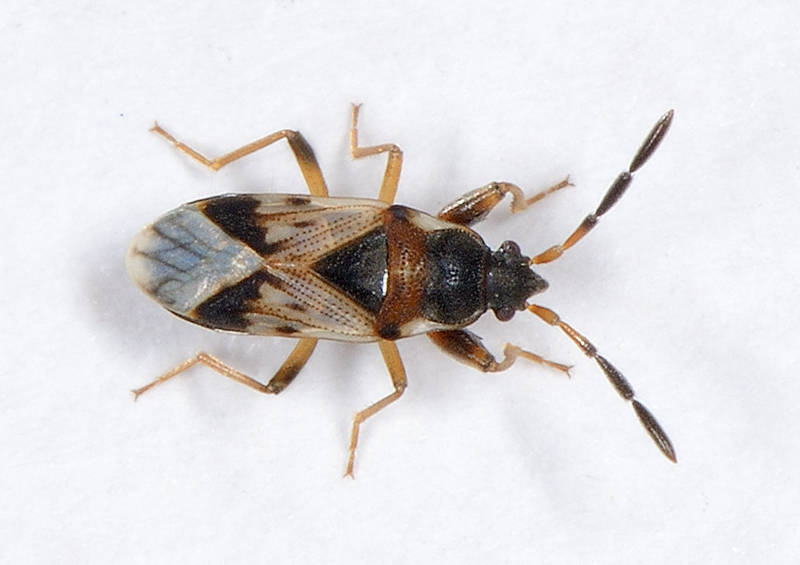
Scolopostethus thomsoni

== Genera ==
The Lygaeoidea Species File lists:

1. Appolonius Distant, 1901
2. Austrodrymus Gross, 1965
3. Bexiocoris Scudder, 1969
4. Borneodrymus Kondorosy, 2006
5. Brachydrymus Gross, 1965
6. Brentiscerus Scudder, 1962
7. Carvalhodrymus Slater, 1995
8. Chotekia China, 1935
9. Coracodrymus Breddin, 1901
10. Drymus Fieber, 1861
11. Dudia Bergroth, 1918
12. Entisberus Distant, 1903
13. Eremocoris Fieber, 1861
14. Esinerus Scudder, 1969
15. Faelicianus Distant, 1901
16. Gastrodes Westwood, 1840
17. Gastrodomorpha Gross, 1965
18. Grossander Slater, 1976
19. Heissodrymus Kondorosy, 2006
20. Hidakacoris Tomokuni, 1998
21. Hirtomydrus Scudder, 1978
22. Ibexocoris Scudder, 1963
23. Ischnocoris Fieber, 1861
24. Kanigara Distant, 1906
25. Lamproplax Douglas & Scott, 1868
26. Latidrymus Kondorosy, 2017
27. Lemnius Distant, 1904
28. Malipatilius Kondorosy, 2013
29. Megadrymus Gross, 1965
30. Mizaldus Distant, 1901
31. Neodudia Scudder, 1978
32. Neomizaldus Scudder, 1968
33. Notochilaster Breddin, 1907
34. Notochilus Fieber, 1864
35. Orsillodes Puton, 1884
36. Paradieuches Distant, 1883
37. Paradrymus Bergroth, 1916
38. Parastilbocoris Carayon, 1964
39. Pilusodrymus Scudder, 1969
40. Potamiaena Distant, 1910
41. Pseudodrymus Gross, 1965
42. Retoka China, 1935
43. Retrodrymus Gross, 1965
44. Rhodiginus Distant, 1901
45. Salaciola Bergroth, 1906
46. Scolopostethus Fieber, 1861
47. Sinierus Distant, 1901
48. Stilbocoris Bergroth, 1893
49. Taphropeltus Stal, 1872
50. Testudodrymus Slater, 1993
51. Thaumastopus Fieber, 1870
52. Thebanus Distant, 1904
53. Thylochromus Barber, 1928
54. Togodolentus Barber, 1918
55. Trichodrymus Lindberg, 1927
56. Udalricus (bug) Distant, 1904
57. Usilanus Distant, 1909
58. Uzza Distant, 1909
