= Levinus Lemnius =

Dutch physician and author (1505–1568)

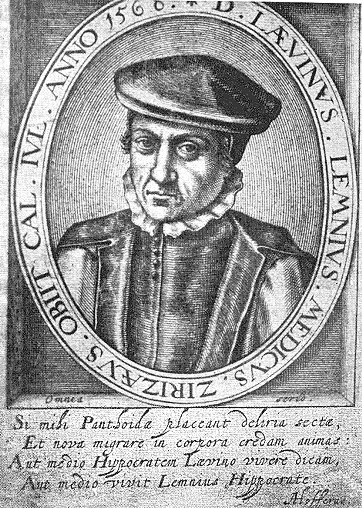
Levinus Lemnius

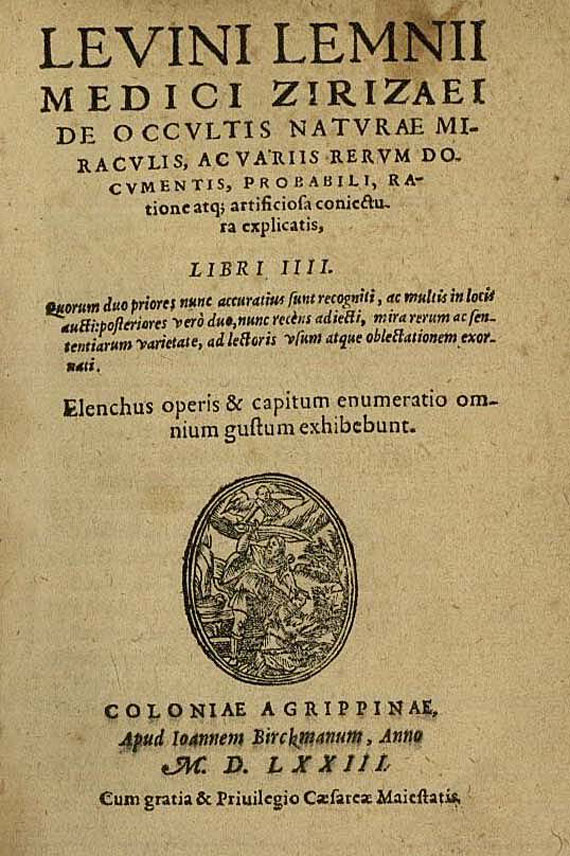
Title page of the 1573 edition of De occultis naturae miraculis (Cologne).

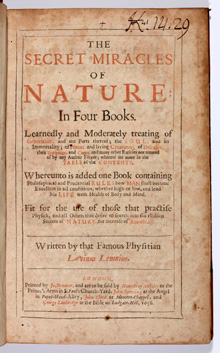
The Secret Miracles of Nature, title page from 1658 of the edition published by John Streater.

Levinus Lemnius (20 May 1505 in Zierikzee – 1 July 1568 in Zierikzee) was a Dutch physician and author.

== Life ==
Lemnius studied medicine at the University of Leuven under Rembert Dodoens and Konrad Gesner; and under Vesalius at Padua. He also travelled to Switzerland and England. After his wife's death, he became a priest.

== Works ==
- Occulta naturae miracula (1559, Antwerp) by the University and State Library Düsseldorf) This was translated as De gli occvlti miracoli, Les Occultes Merveilles et Secretz de Nature (online text, The secret miracles of nature, and Wunderbarliche Geheimnisse der Natur online text).
- De habitu et constitutione corporis (1561, Antwerp). As The Touchstone of Complexions (1576) (translation into English by Thomas Newton)
- Herbarum atque arborum quae in Bibliis passim obviae sunt et ex quibus sacri vates similitudines desumunt. In English as An Herbal for the Bible (1579, Newton translation).
- De miraculis occultis naturae : libri IIII (1611, Francofurti) by the University and State Library Düsseldorf

His Occulta naturae miracula, a book of secrets, is his best-known work. It ran through many editions and was widely translated from Latin. It drew on classical sources, particularly Aristotle. Lemnius was influenced, too, by the "airs, waters, places" doctrine from the Hippocratic Corpus. The work attempted to reconcile natural philosophy as found in classical sources with Christian doctrine, particularly on generation and reproduction, while emphasising extraordinary aspects. His humoral theory was complex, with phlegm being divided into four, and the other humours also being subdivided.

He is credited with first mentioning in this work of staining of bone, with madder root. In the same work he gives credence to the theory of maternal impression; his theory of teratology connects the Aristotelian theory of generation with birth defects. He contributed to demonology, with Johann Weyer, by suggesting that mental illness and disturbance could be physically caused, rather than being a result of outside influence. He also credited Solomon with the invention of the magnetic compass.

This work in some form had a lifetime of nearly four centuries. It was later combined with a German manual on midwifery by Jakob Rüff, to create Aristotle's Masterpiece, a 17th-century work in English of advice on sex and reproduction, still sold in later editions in the 1930s.
