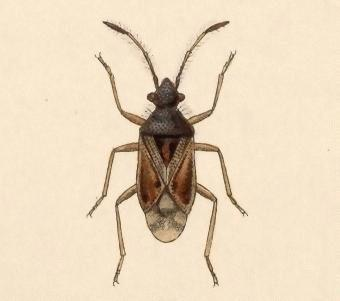
- Acolhua championi

Scientific classification
- Domain: Eukaryota
- Kingdom: Animalia
- Phylum: Arthropoda
- Class: Insecta
- Order: Hemiptera
- Suborder: Heteroptera
- Family: Rhyparochromidae
- Subfamily: Rhyparochrominae

Tribes
- Antillocorini; Cleradini; Drymini; Gonianotini; Lethaeini; Lilliputocorini; Megalonotini; Myodochini; Ozophorini; Phasmosomini; Rhyparochromini; Stygnocorini; Targaremini; Udeocorini

Diversity
- at least 410 genera

= Rhyparochrominae =

Subfamily of true bugs

Rhyparochrominae is a subfamily of dirt-colored seed bugs in the family Rhyparochromidae. There are more than 410 genera and 2,000 described species in Rhyparochrominae.

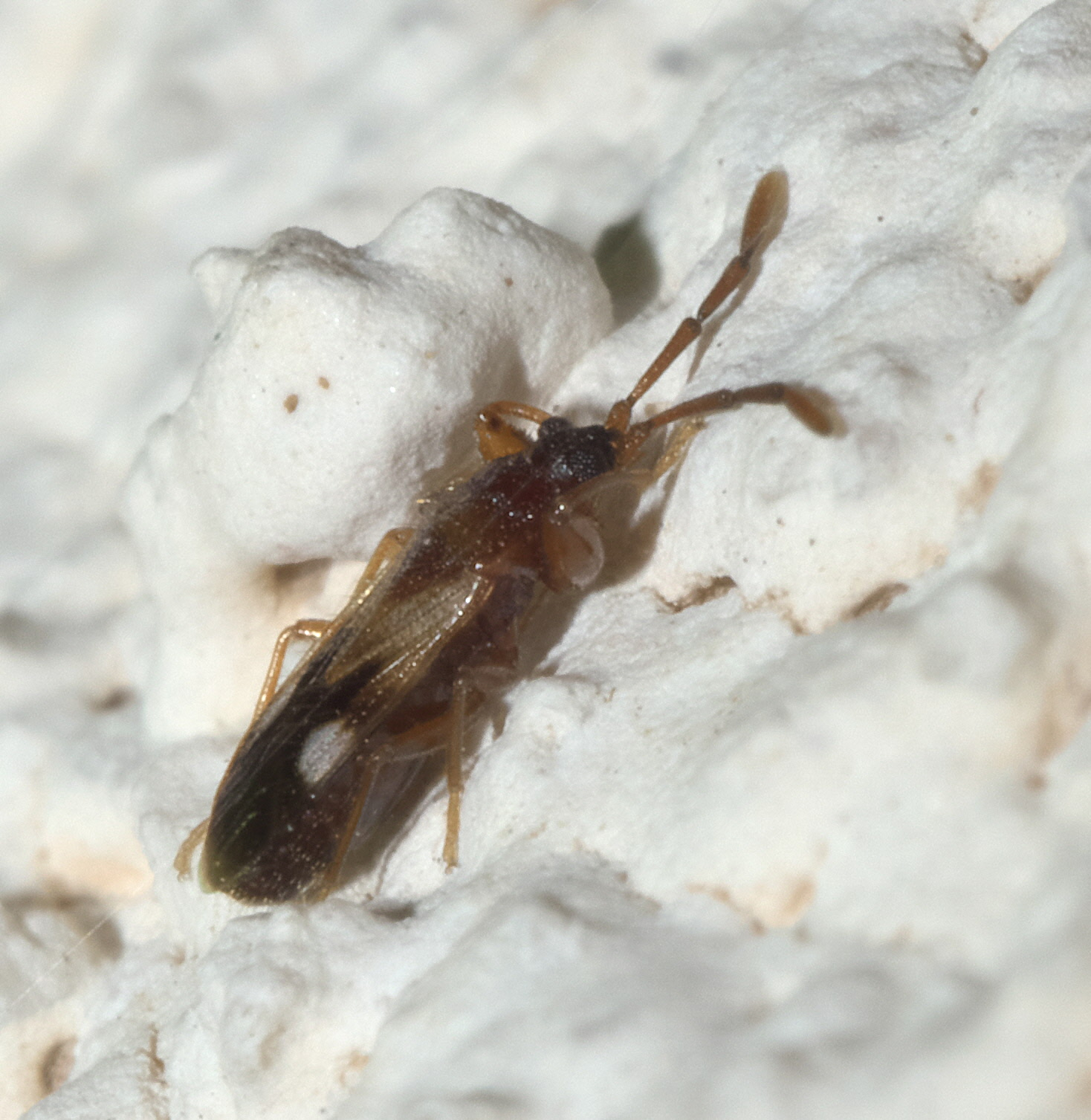
Tempyra biguttula

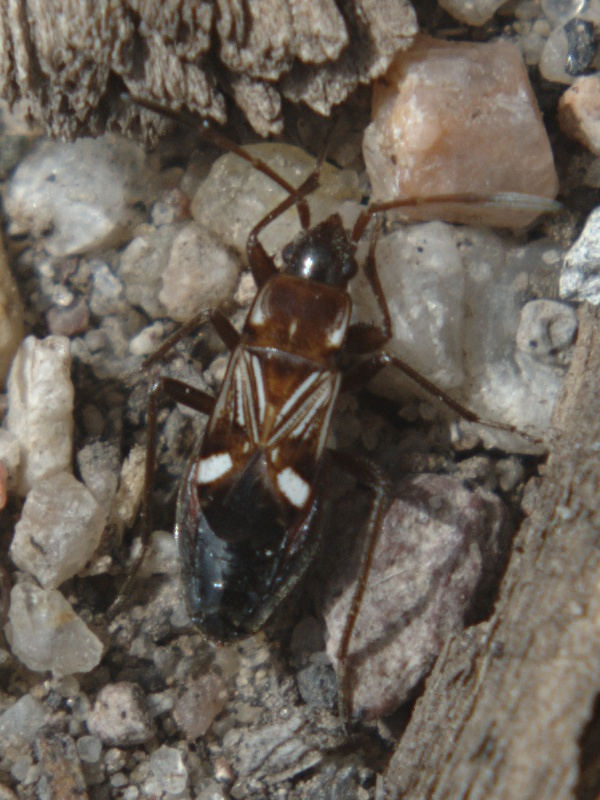
Uhleriola floralis

== See also ==
- List of Rhyparochrominae genera
