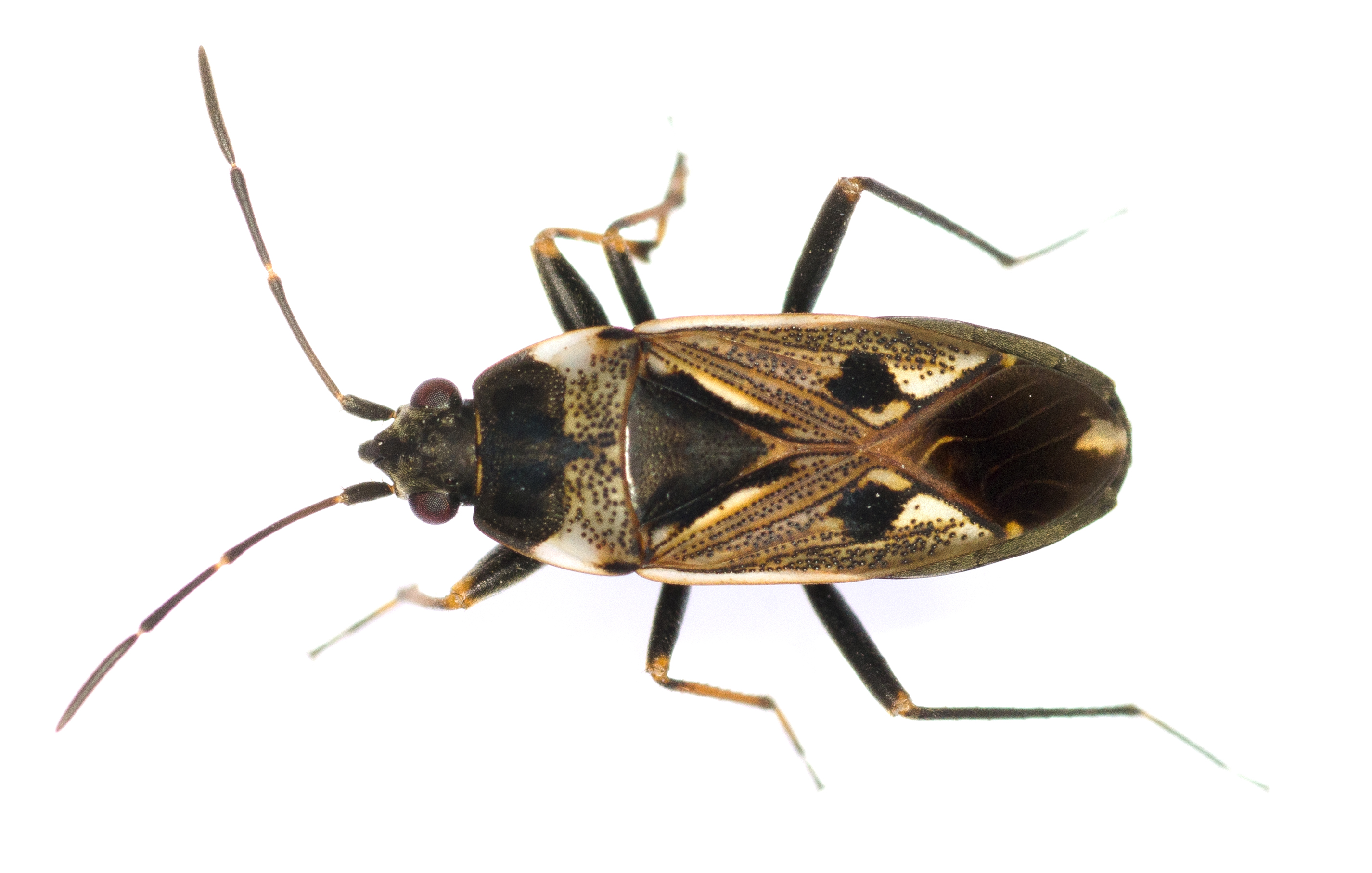
- Rhyparochromus vulgaris

Scientific classification
- Kingdom: Animalia
- Phylum: Arthropoda
- Clade: Pancrustacea
- Class: Insecta
- Order: Hemiptera
- Suborder: Heteroptera
- Superfamily: Lygaeoidea
- Family: Rhyparochromidae; Amyot and Serville, 1843

Subfamilies
- Plinthisinae; Rhyparochrominae

= Rhyparochromidae =

Family of true bugs

The Rhyparochromidae are a large family of true bugs (order Hemiptera). Many species under Rhyparochromidae are commonly referred to as seed bugs, as are other species within the wider Pentatomomorpha. The family includes two subfamilies, more than 420 genera, and over 2,100 described species.

Rhyparochromidae are small and generally brown or mottled. The fore femora are often enlarged.

The name Rhyparochromidae comes from the Greek words rhyparos, meaning "dirt", and chromus, meaning "color".

The Rhyparochromidae were previously classified as a subfamily of Lygaeidae.

== Subfamilies and Tribes ==
The family Rhyparochromidae has two subfamilies, Plinthisinae with only 2 genera, and Rhyparochrominae with more than 400 genera in 14 tribes:

Antillocorini
Cleradini
Drymini
Gonianotini
Lethaeini
Lilliputocorini
Megalonotini
Myodochini
Ozophorini
Phasmosomini
Rhyparochromini
Stygnocorini
Targaremini
Udeocorini

== See also ==
- List of Rhyparochrominae genera
