= Myodocha annulicornis =

Scientific classification
- Domain: Eukaryota
- Kingdom: Animalia
- Phylum: Arthropoda
- Class: Insecta
- Order: Hemiptera
- Suborder: Heteroptera
- Family: Rhyparochromidae
- Tribe: Myodochini
- Genus: Myodocha
- Species: M. annulicornis

Binomial name
- Myodocha annulicornis Blatchley, 1926

Species of true bug

Myodocha annulicornis, the banded long-necked seed bug, is a species of dirt-colored seed bug in the family Rhyparochromidae. It is found in North America.
