= Zeridoneus knulli =

Scientific classification
- Domain: Eukaryota
- Kingdom: Animalia
- Phylum: Arthropoda
- Class: Insecta
- Order: Hemiptera
- Suborder: Heteroptera
- Family: Rhyparochromidae
- Tribe: Myodochini
- Genus: Zeridoneus
- Species: Z. knulli

Binomial name
- Zeridoneus knulli Barber, 1948

Species of true bug

Zeridoneus knulli is a species of dirt-colored seed bug in the family Rhyparochromidae. It is found in North America.
