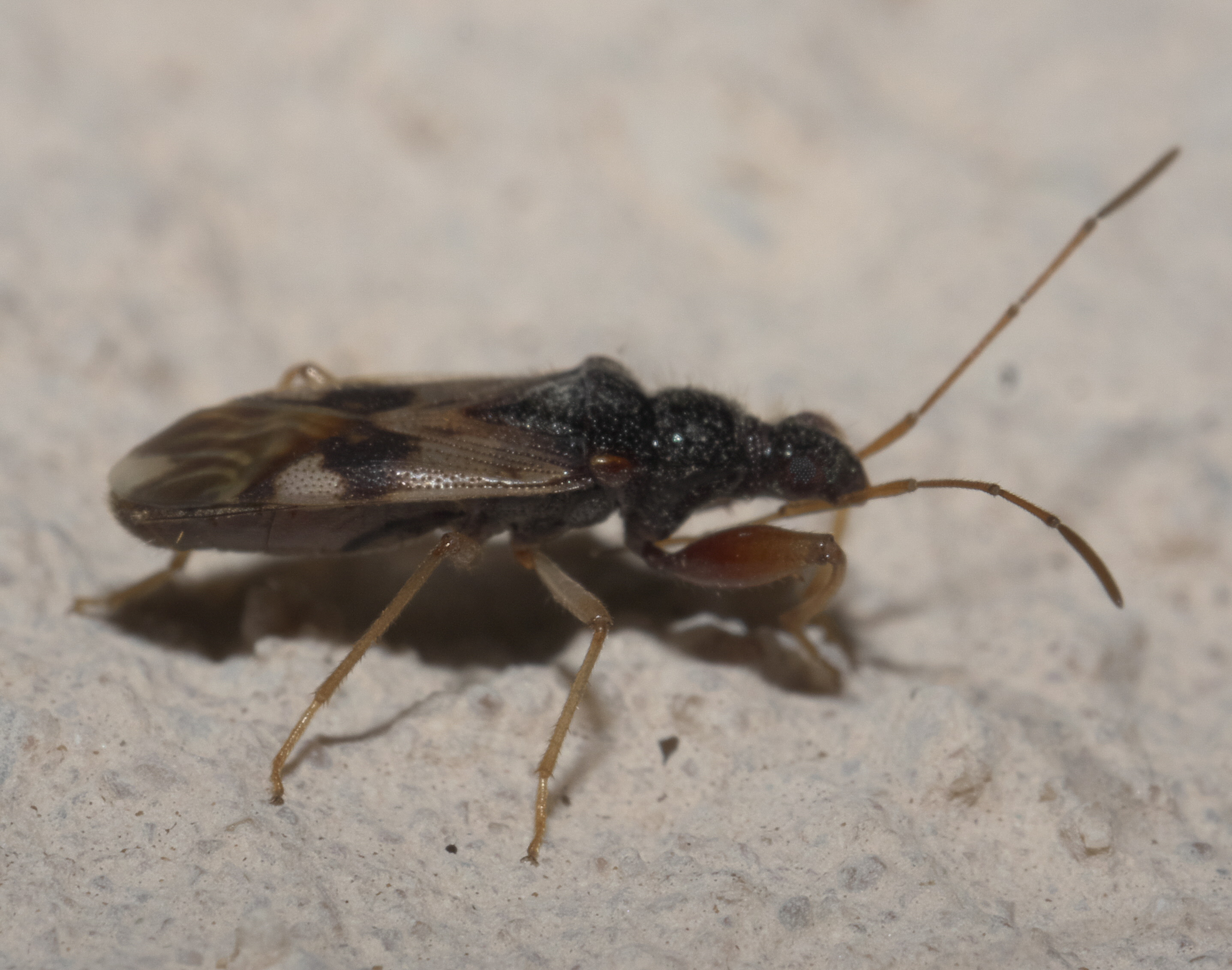

Scientific classification
- Domain: Eukaryota
- Kingdom: Animalia
- Phylum: Arthropoda
- Class: Insecta
- Order: Hemiptera
- Suborder: Heteroptera
- Family: Rhyparochromidae
- Tribe: Myodochini
- Genus: Pseudopamera
- Species: P. nitidula

Binomial name
- Pseudopamera nitidula (Uhler, 1893)

= Pseudopamera nitidula =

Species of true bug

Pseudopamera nitidula is a species of dirt-colored seed bug in the family Rhyparochromidae. It is found in Central America and North America.

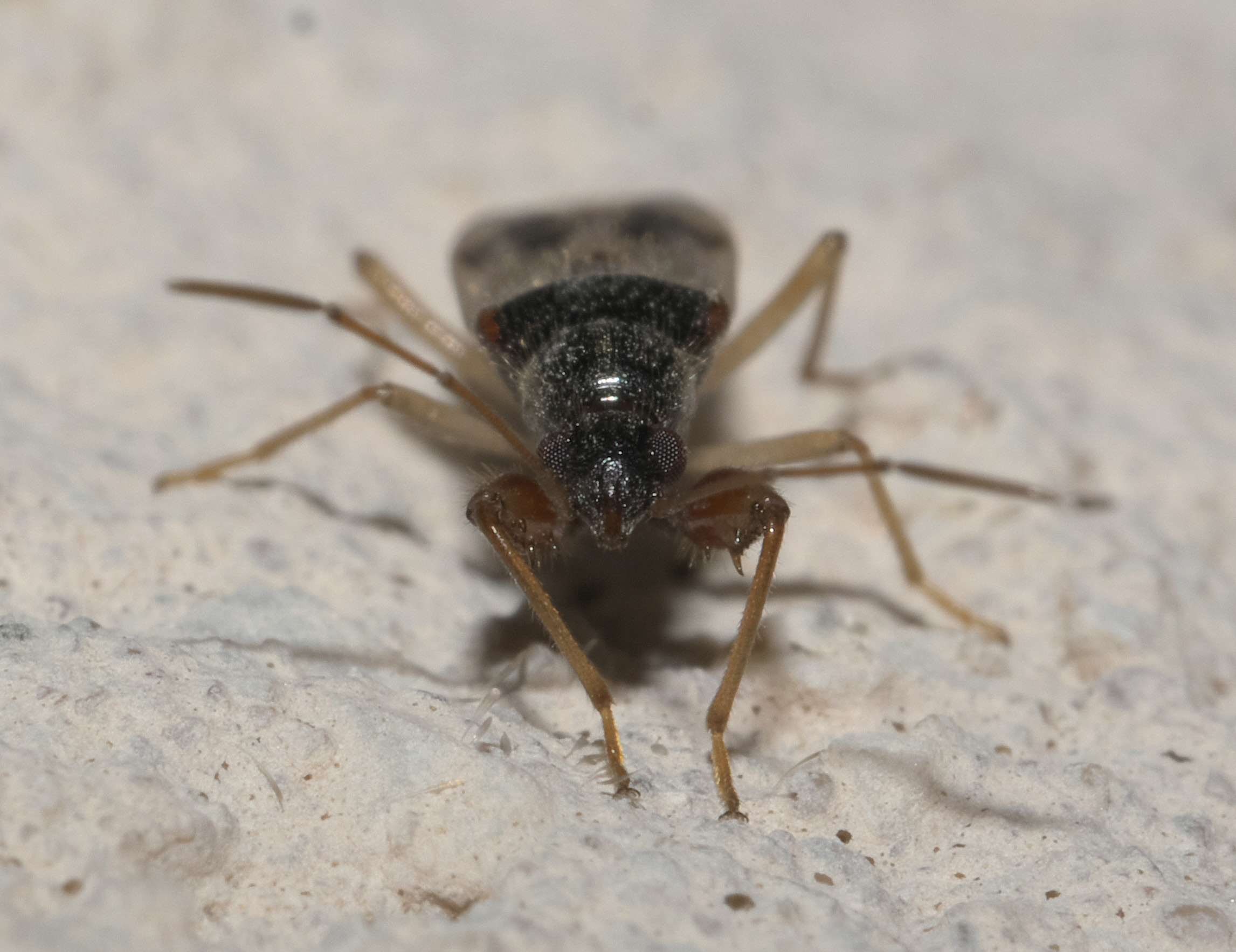

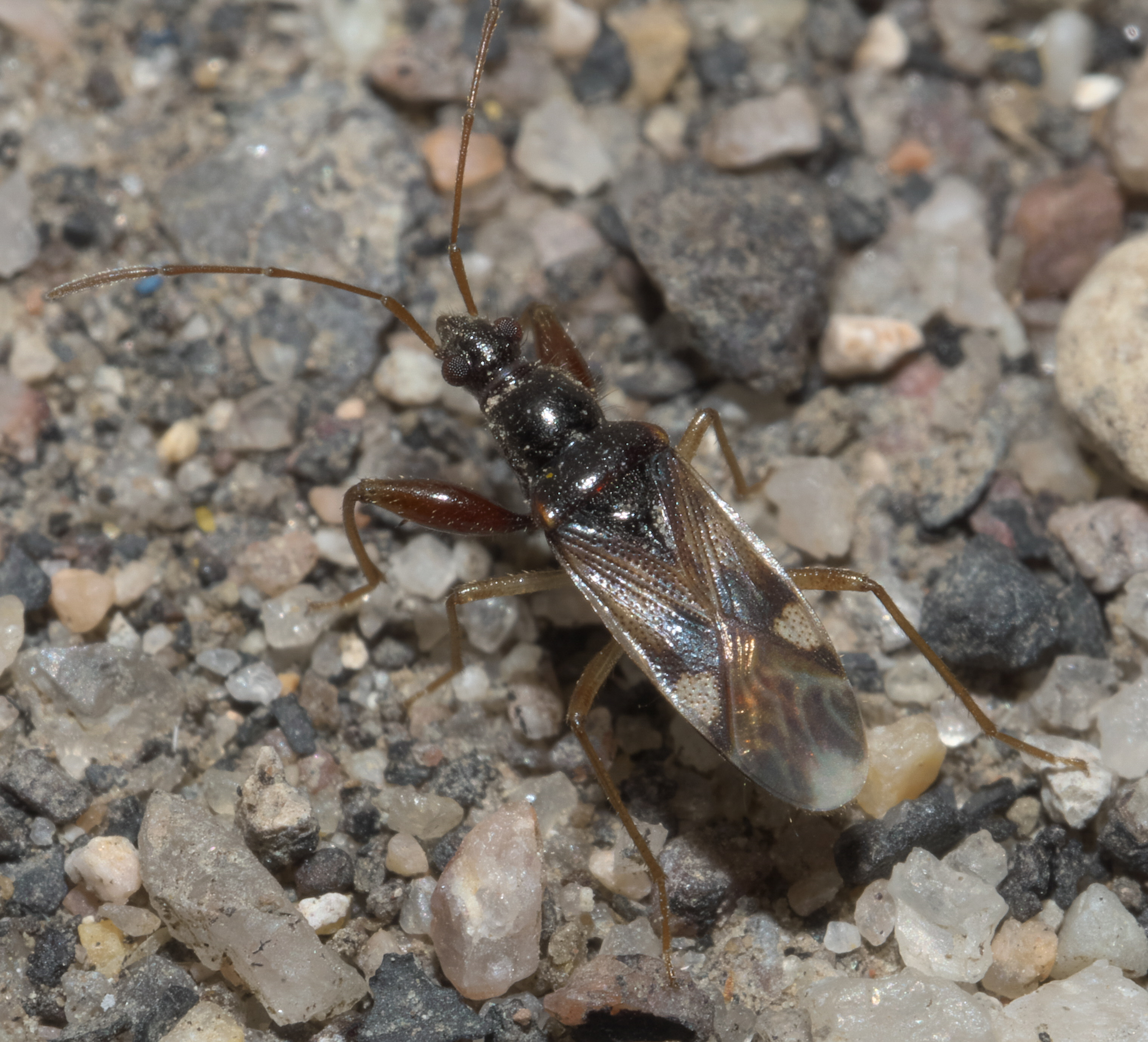
