= Slaterobius insignis =

Scientific classification
- Domain: Eukaryota
- Kingdom: Animalia
- Phylum: Arthropoda
- Class: Insecta
- Order: Hemiptera
- Suborder: Heteroptera
- Family: Rhyparochromidae
- Tribe: Myodochini
- Genus: Slaterobius
- Species: S. insignis

Binomial name
- Slaterobius insignis (Uhler, 1872)

Synonyms
- Heraeus insignis Uhler, 1872

Species of true bug

Slaterobius insignis is a species of dirt-colored seed bug in the family Rhyparochromidae, which is found in North America.
