= Zeridoneus costalis =

Scientific classification
- Domain: Eukaryota
- Kingdom: Animalia
- Phylum: Arthropoda
- Class: Insecta
- Order: Hemiptera
- Suborder: Heteroptera
- Family: Rhyparochromidae
- Tribe: Myodochini
- Genus: Zeridoneus
- Species: Z. costalis

Binomial name
- Zeridoneus costalis (Van Duzee, 1909)

Synonyms
- Perigenes costalis Van Duzee, 1909

Species of true bug

Zeridoneus costalis is a species of dirt-colored seed bug in the family Rhyparochromidae. It is found in North America.
