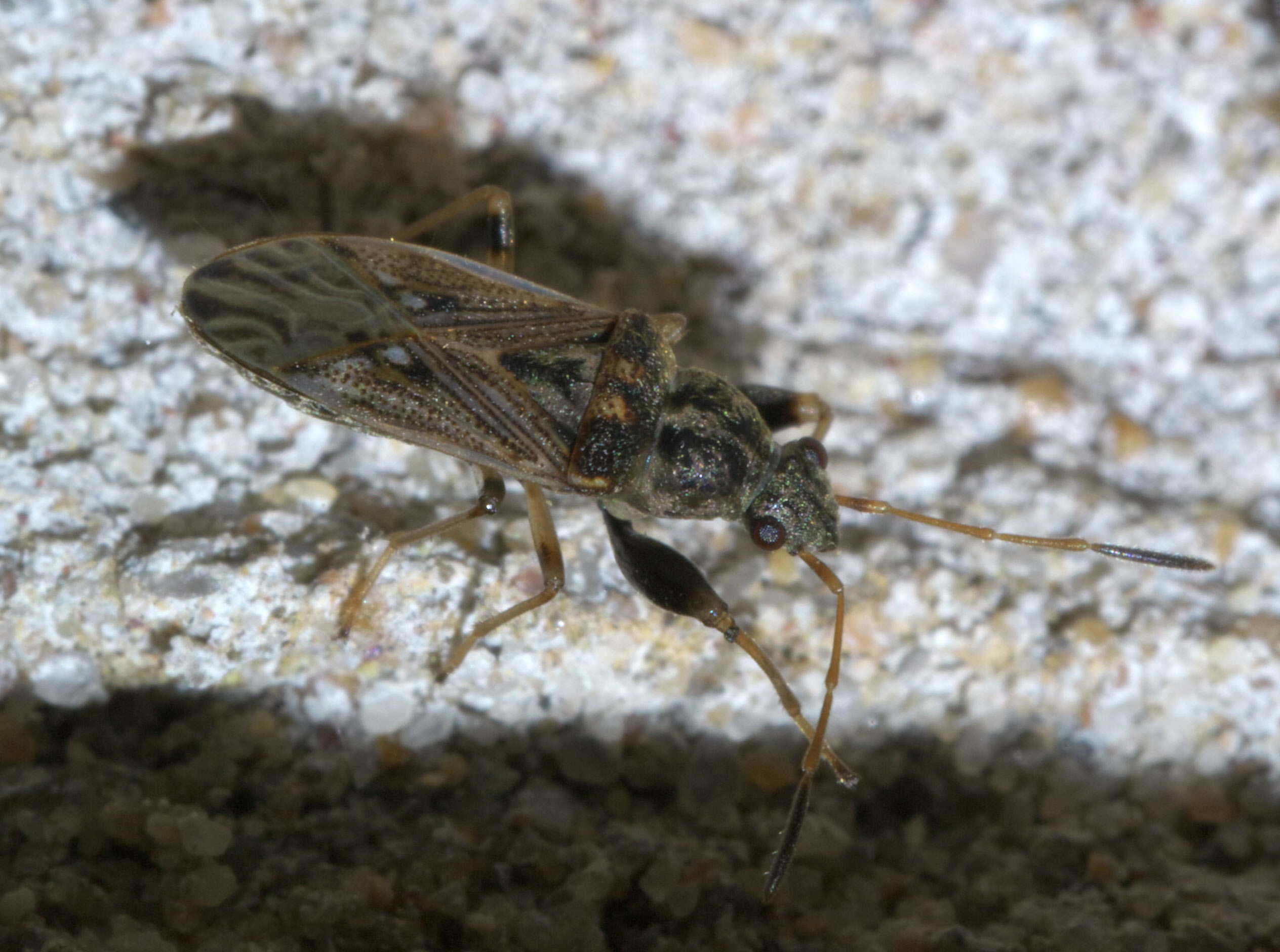

Scientific classification
- Domain: Eukaryota
- Kingdom: Animalia
- Phylum: Arthropoda
- Class: Insecta
- Order: Hemiptera
- Suborder: Heteroptera
- Family: Rhyparochromidae
- Tribe: Myodochini
- Genus: Pseudopachybrachius
- Species: P. basalis

Binomial name
- Pseudopachybrachius basalis (Dallas, 1852)

= Pseudopachybrachius basalis =

Species of true bug

Pseudopachybrachius basalis is a species of dirt-colored seed bug in the family Rhyparochromidae. It is found in the Caribbean Sea, Central America, and North America.
