= Prytanes dissimilis =

Scientific classification
- Domain: Eukaryota
- Kingdom: Animalia
- Phylum: Arthropoda
- Class: Insecta
- Order: Hemiptera
- Suborder: Heteroptera
- Family: Rhyparochromidae
- Tribe: Myodochini
- Genus: Prytanes
- Species: P. dissimilis

Binomial name
- Prytanes dissimilis (Barber, 1953)

Species of true bug

Prytanes dissimilis is a species of dirt-colored seed bug in the family Rhyparochromidae. It is found in the Caribbean Sea and North America.
