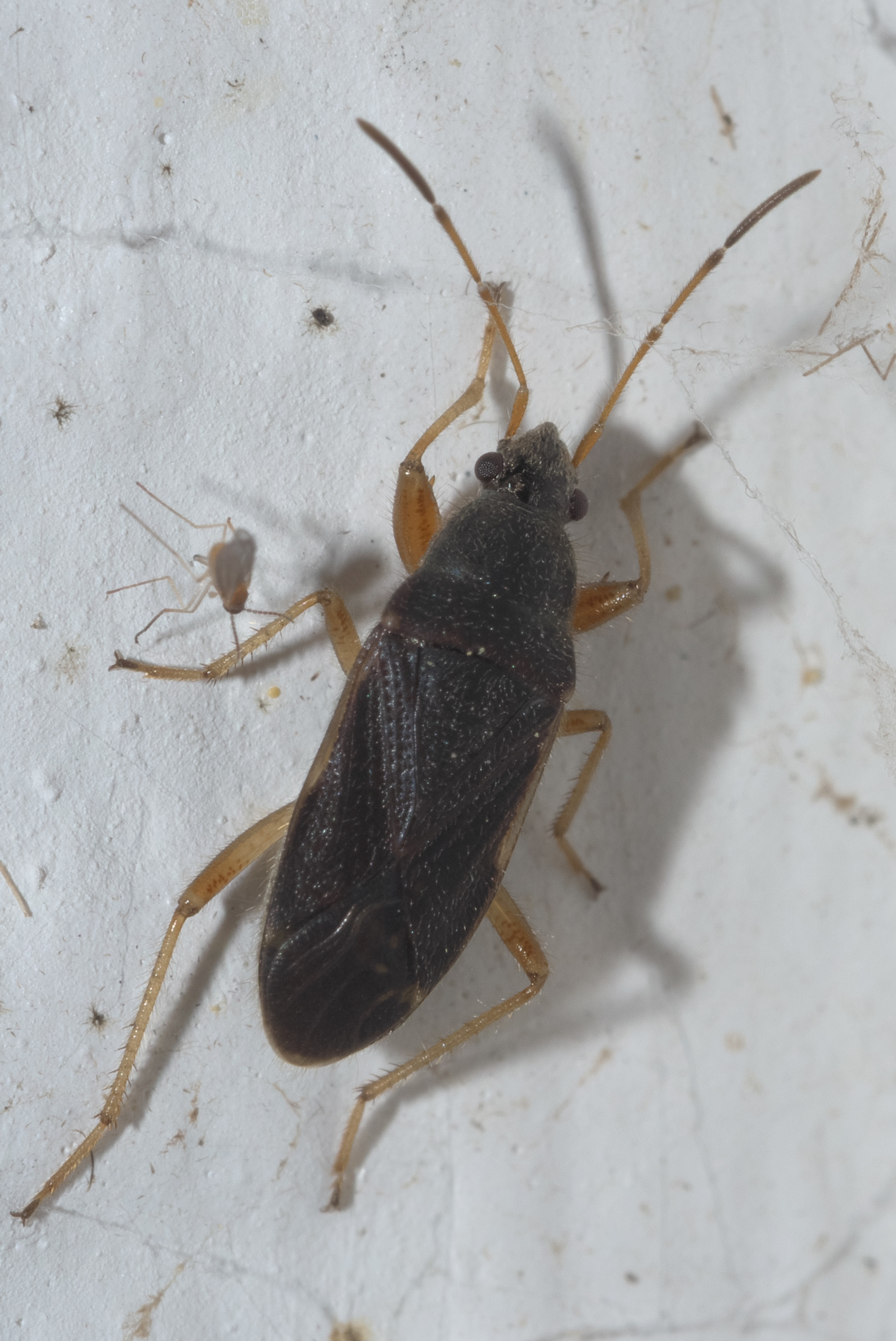

Scientific classification
- Domain: Eukaryota
- Kingdom: Animalia
- Phylum: Arthropoda
- Class: Insecta
- Order: Hemiptera
- Suborder: Heteroptera
- Family: Rhyparochromidae
- Tribe: Myodochini
- Genus: Perigenes
- Species: P. similis

Binomial name
- Perigenes similis Barber, 1906

= Perigenes similis =

Species of true bug

Perigenes similis is a species of dirt-colored seed bug in the family Rhyparochromidae. It is found in North America.
