= Ereminellus vitabundus =

Scientific classification
- Domain: Eukaryota
- Kingdom: Animalia
- Phylum: Arthropoda
- Class: Insecta
- Order: Hemiptera
- Suborder: Heteroptera
- Family: Rhyparochromidae
- Tribe: Myodochini
- Genus: Ereminellus
- Species: E. vitabundus

Binomial name
- Ereminellus vitabundus Brailovsky & Barrera, 1984

Species of true bug

Ereminellus vitabundus is a species of dirt-colored seed bug in the family Rhyparochromidae. It is found in North America.
