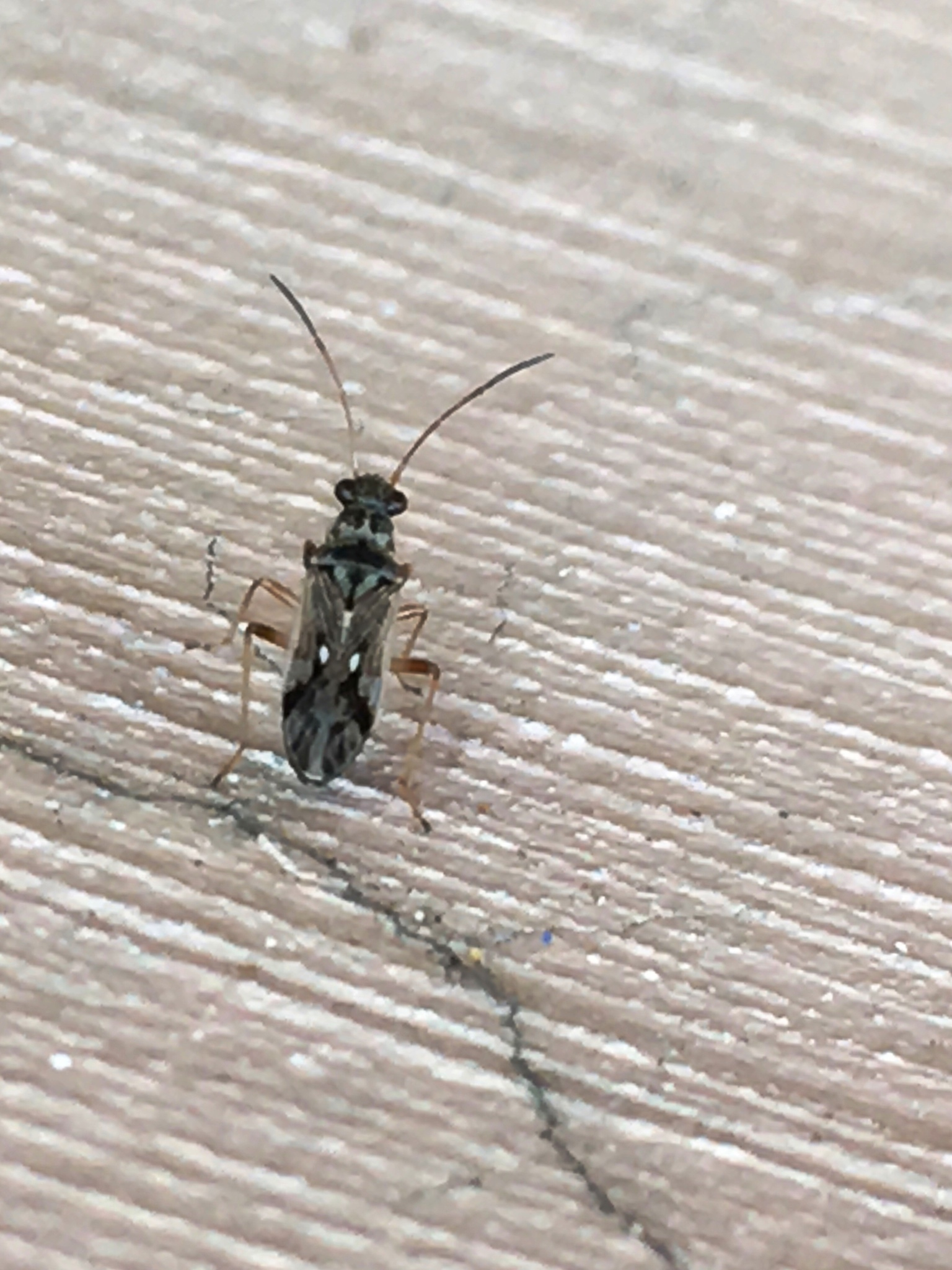
- Pseudopachybrachius guttus, Luzon

Scientific classification
- Kingdom: Animalia
- Phylum: Arthropoda
- Clade: Pancrustacea
- Class: Insecta
- Order: Hemiptera
- Suborder: Heteroptera
- Family: Rhyparochromidae
- Subfamily: Rhyparochrominae
- Tribe: Myodochini
- Genus: Pseudopachybrachius
- Species: P. guttus

Binomial name
- Pseudopachybrachius guttus (Dallas, 1852)

= Pseudopachybrachius guttus =

Species of dirt-colored seed bug

Pseudopachybrachius guttus is a species of dirt-colored seed bug in the family Rhyparochromidae, found in Southeast Asia and Oceania.
