= Pseudopamera nitidicollis =

Scientific classification
- Domain: Eukaryota
- Kingdom: Animalia
- Phylum: Arthropoda
- Class: Insecta
- Order: Hemiptera
- Suborder: Heteroptera
- Family: Rhyparochromidae
- Tribe: Myodochini
- Genus: Pseudopamera
- Species: P. nitidicollis

Binomial name
- Pseudopamera nitidicollis (Stal, 1874)

Species of true bug

Pseudopamera nitidicollis is a species of dirt-colored seed bug in the family Rhyparochromidae. It is found in Central America and North America.
