= Prytanes fuscicornis =

Scientific classification
- Kingdom: Animalia
- Phylum: Arthropoda
- Clade: Pancrustacea
- Class: Insecta
- Order: Hemiptera
- Suborder: Heteroptera
- Family: Rhyparochromidae
- Tribe: Myodochini
- Genus: Prytanes
- Species: P. fuscicornis

Binomial name
- Prytanes fuscicornis (Stal, 1874)

Species of true bug

Prytanes fuscicornis is a species of dirt-colored seed bug in the family Rhyparochromidae. It is found in the Americas.
