= Froeschneria piligera =

Scientific classification
- Domain: Eukaryota
- Kingdom: Animalia
- Phylum: Arthropoda
- Class: Insecta
- Order: Hemiptera
- Suborder: Heteroptera
- Family: Rhyparochromidae
- Tribe: Myodochini
- Genus: Froeschneria
- Species: F. piligera

Binomial name
- Froeschneria piligera (Stal, 1862)

Species of true bug

Froeschneria piligera is a species of dirt-colored seed bug in the family Rhyparochromidae.
