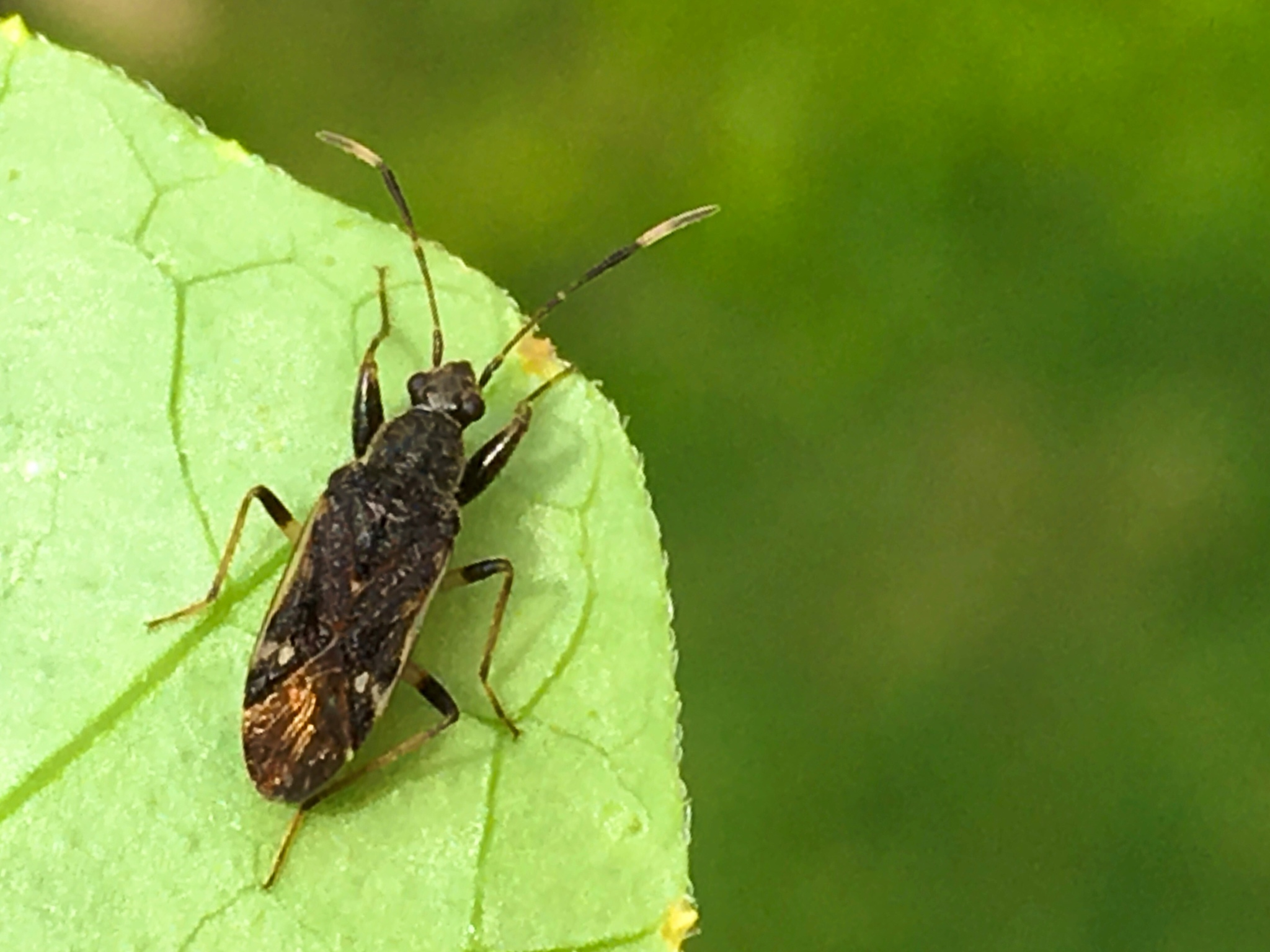
- Horridipamera nietneri, Philippines

Scientific classification
- Domain: Eukaryota
- Kingdom: Animalia
- Phylum: Arthropoda
- Class: Insecta
- Order: Hemiptera
- Suborder: Heteroptera
- Family: Rhyparochromidae
- Subfamily: Rhyparochrominae
- Tribe: Myodochini
- Genus: Horridipamera
- Species: H. nietneri

Binomial name
- Horridipamera nietneri (Dohrn, 1860)

= Horridipamera nietneri =

Species of dirt-colored seed bug

Horridipamera nietneri is a species of dirt-colored seed bug in the family Rhyparochromidae, found in Indomalaya.
