= Froeschneria =

Scientific classification
- Domain: Eukaryota
- Kingdom: Animalia
- Phylum: Arthropoda
- Class: Insecta
- Order: Hemiptera
- Suborder: Heteroptera
- Family: Rhyparochromidae
- Subfamily: Rhyparochrominae
- Tribe: Myodochini
- Genus: Froeschneria; Harrington, 1980

Genus of true bugs

Froeschneria is a genus of dirt-colored seed bugs in the family Rhyparochromidae. There are about five described species in Froeschneria.

== Species ==
These five species belong to the genus Froeschneria:

- Froeschneria infumatus (Distant, 1893)
- Froeschneria multispinus (Stal, 1874)
- Froeschneria oblitus (Distant, 1893)
- Froeschneria piligera (Stal, 1862)
- Froeschneria vicinalis (Distant, 1893)
