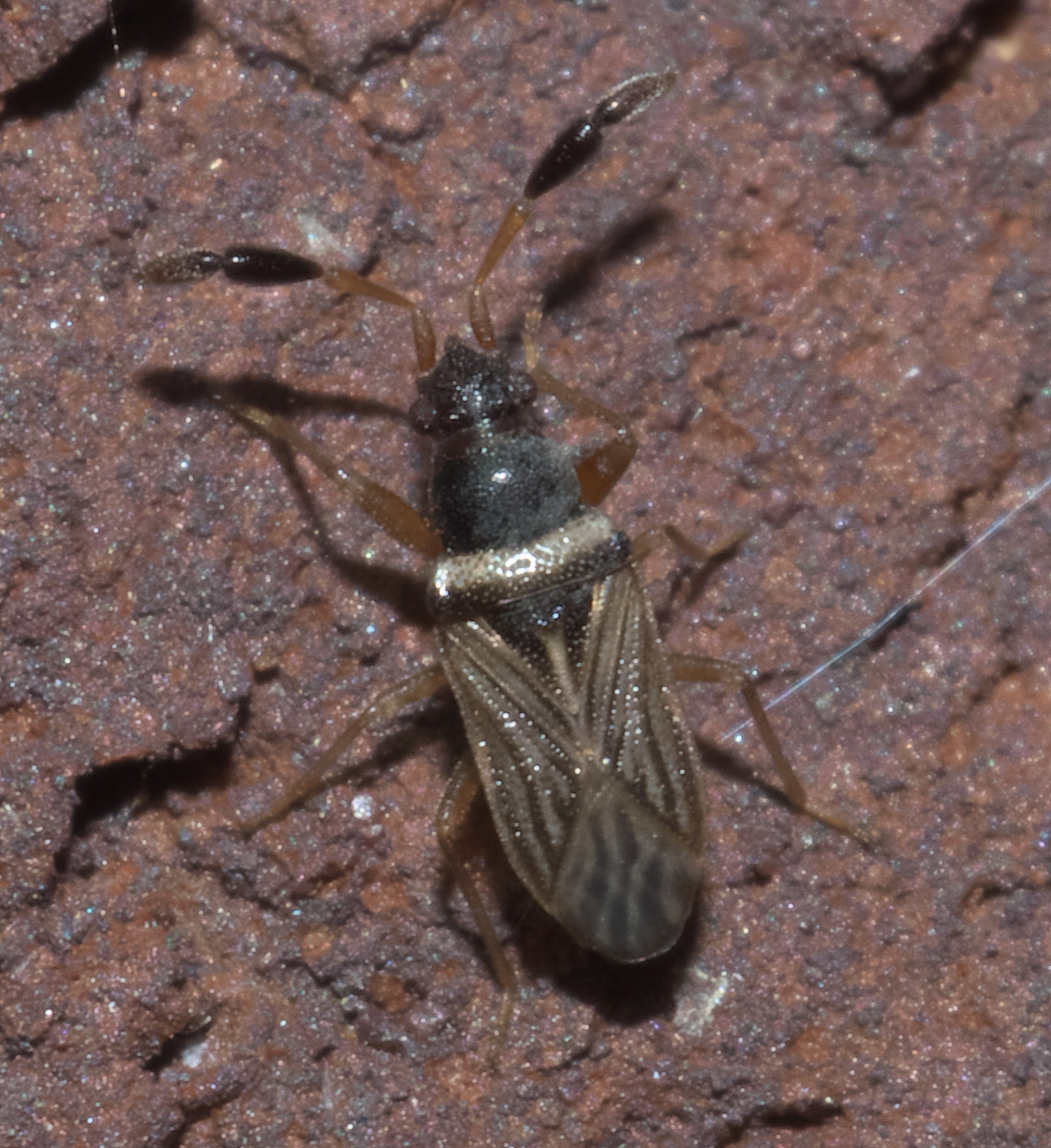

Scientific classification
- Domain: Eukaryota
- Kingdom: Animalia
- Phylum: Arthropoda
- Class: Insecta
- Order: Hemiptera
- Suborder: Heteroptera
- Family: Rhyparochromidae
- Genus: Ptochiomera
- Species: P. nodosa

Binomial name
- Ptochiomera nodosa Say, 1832

= Ptochiomera nodosa =

Species of true bug

Ptochiomera nodosa is a species of dirt-colored seed bug in the family Rhyparochromidae. It is found in Central America and North America.

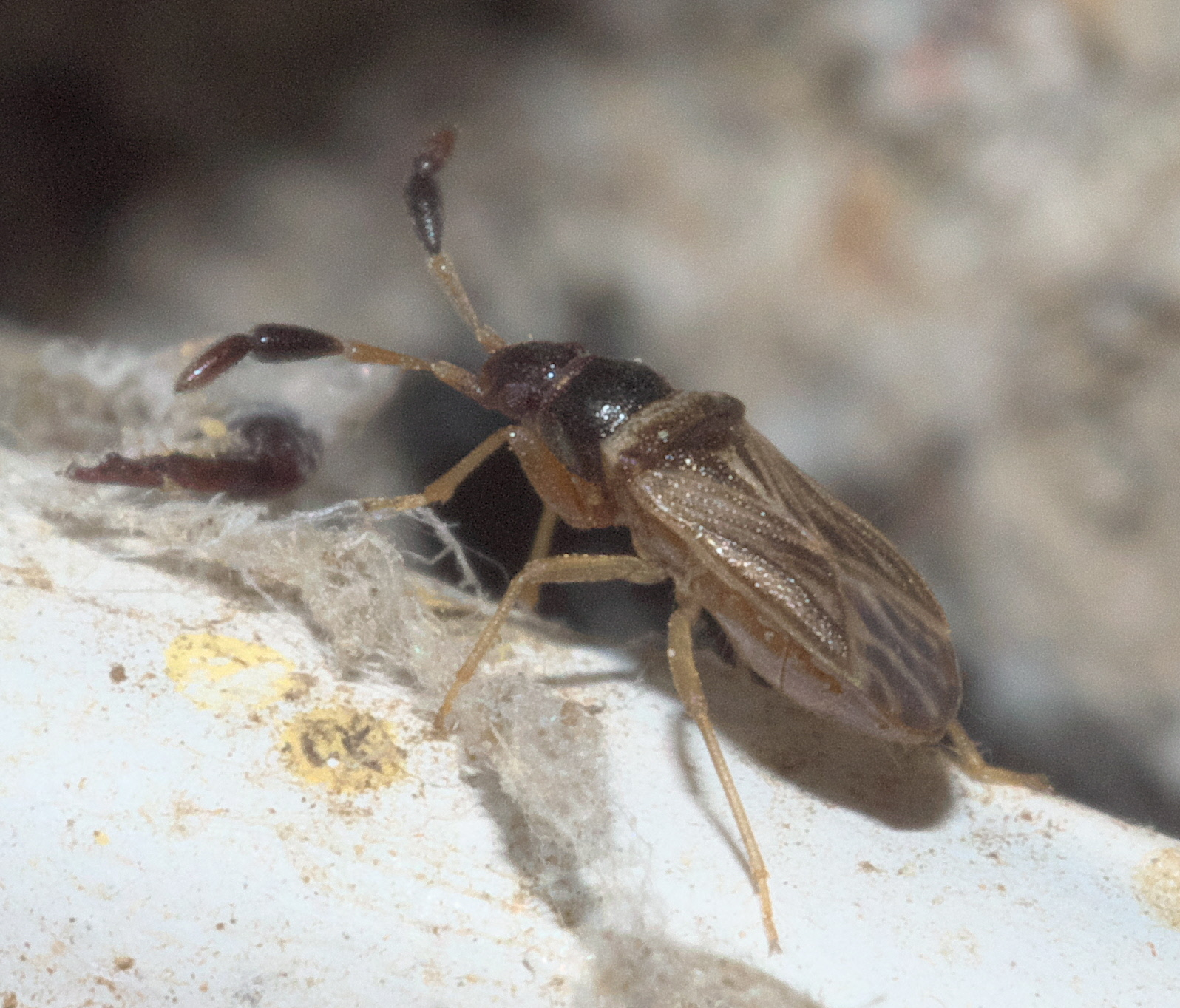
