= Carpilis =

Scientific classification
- Kingdom: Animalia
- Phylum: Arthropoda
- Clade: Pancrustacea
- Class: Insecta
- Order: Hemiptera
- Suborder: Heteroptera
- Family: Rhyparochromidae
- Subfamily: Rhyparochrominae
- Tribe: Myodochini
- Genus: Carpilis; Stal, 1874

Genus of true bugs

Carpilis is a genus of dirt-colored seed bugs in the family Rhyparochromidae. There are at least three described species in Carpilis.

== Species ==
These three species belong to the genus Carpilis:

- Carpilis barberi Blatchley, 1924
- Carpilis consimilis Barber, 1949
- Carpilis ferruginea Stal, 1874
