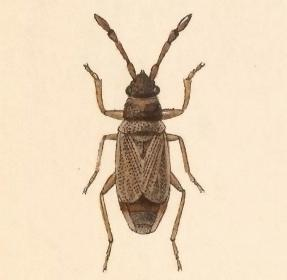
- Sisamnes contractus

Scientific classification
- Domain: Eukaryota
- Kingdom: Animalia
- Phylum: Arthropoda
- Class: Insecta
- Order: Hemiptera
- Suborder: Heteroptera
- Family: Rhyparochromidae
- Tribe: Myodochini
- Genus: Sisamnes; Distant, 1893

= Sisamnes (bug) =

Genus of true bugs

Sisamnes is a genus of dirt-colored seed bugs in the family Rhyparochromidae. There are at least four described species in Sisamnes.

== Species ==
These four species belong to the genus Sisamnes:

- Sisamnes annulicollis (Berg, C., 1894)^{c g}
- Sisamnes claviger (Uhler, 1895)^{i g b}
- Sisamnes clavigerus (Uhler, 1895)^{c g}
- Sisamnes contractus Distant, 1893^{i c g b}

Data sources: i = ITIS, c = Catalogue of Life, g = GBIF, b = Bugguide.net
