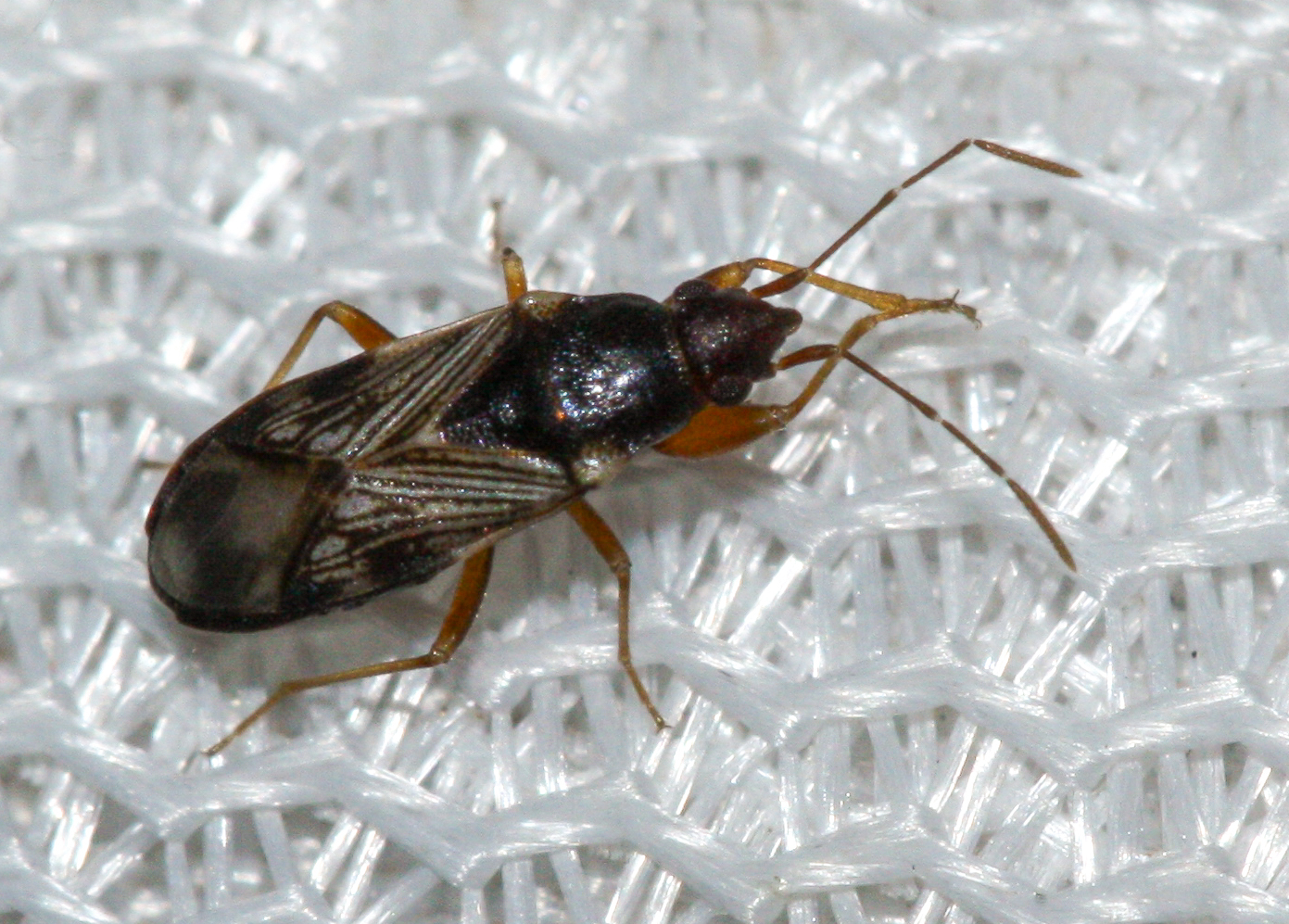
- Ereminellus arizonensis

Scientific classification
- Kingdom: Animalia
- Phylum: Arthropoda
- Class: Insecta
- Order: Hemiptera
- Suborder: Heteroptera
- Family: Rhyparochromidae
- Subfamily: Rhyparochrominae
- Tribe: Myodochini
- Genus: Ereminellus; Harrington, 1980

= Ereminellus =

Genus of true bugs

Ereminellus is a genus of dirt-colored seed bugs in the family Rhyparochromidae. There are at least two described species in the genus Ereminellus.

== Species ==
These two species belong to the genus Ereminellus:

- Ereminellus arizonensis (Barber, 1932)
- Ereminellus vitabundus Brailovsky & Barrera, 1984
