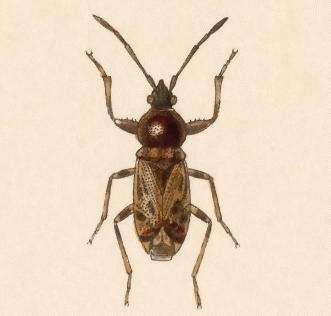
- Prytanes globosus

Scientific classification
- Domain: Eukaryota
- Kingdom: Animalia
- Phylum: Arthropoda
- Class: Insecta
- Order: Hemiptera
- Suborder: Heteroptera
- Family: Rhyparochromidae
- Tribe: Myodochini
- Genus: Prytanes; Distant, 1893

Synonyms
- Exptochiomera Barber, 1928

= Prytanes (bug) =

Genus of true bugs

Prytanes is a genus of dirt-colored seed bugs in the family Rhyparochromidae. There are about 17 described species in Prytanes.

== Species ==
These 17 species belong to the genus Prytanes:

- Prytanes albomaculata (Distant, 1893)^{c g}
- Prytanes caeca (Distant, W.L., 1882)^{c g}
- Prytanes confusa (Barber, H.G., 1953)^{c g}
- Prytanes confusus (Barber, 1953)^{i b}
- Prytanes cubensis Barber, H.G., 1954^{c g}
- Prytanes dissimilis (Barber, 1953)^{i c g b}
- Prytanes foeda (Stal, C., 1858)^{c g}
- Prytanes formosus (Distant, 1882)^{i c g}
- Prytanes fuscicornis (Stål, 1874)^{i c g b}
- Prytanes globosus Distant, 1893^{i c g}
- Prytanes intercisa (Barber, H.G., 1932)^{c g}
- Prytanes intercisus (Barber, 1932)^{i}
- Prytanes minima (Guérin-Méneville, 1857)^{c g}
- Prytanes oblonga (Stal, C., 1862)^{c g}
- Prytanes oblongus (Stål, 1862)^{i b}
- Prytanes plebeius (Spinola, M., 1852)^{c g}
- Prytanes tumens (Stal, C., 1874)^{c g}

Data sources: i = ITIS, c = Catalogue of Life, g = GBIF, b = Bugguide.net
