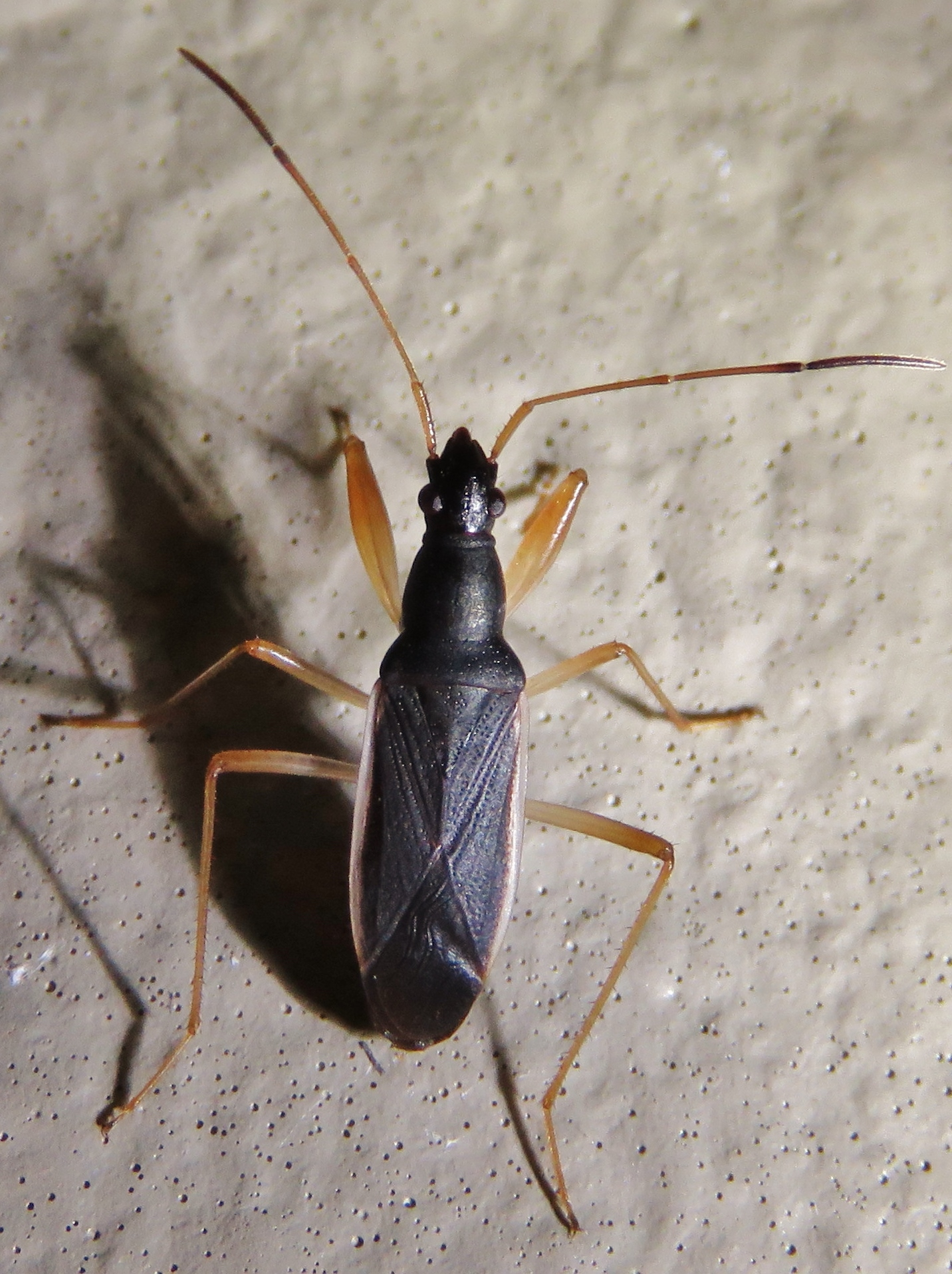

Scientific classification
- Kingdom: Animalia
- Phylum: Arthropoda
- Clade: Pancrustacea
- Class: Insecta
- Order: Hemiptera
- Suborder: Heteroptera
- Family: Rhyparochromidae
- Genus: Cnemodus
- Species: C. mavortius

Binomial name
- Cnemodus mavortius (Say, 1832)

Synonyms
- Cnemodus brevipennis Herrich-Schaeffer, 1850

= Cnemodus mavortius =

Species of true bug

Cnemodus mavortius is a species of dirt-colored seed bug in the family Rhyparochromidae. It is found in North America.
