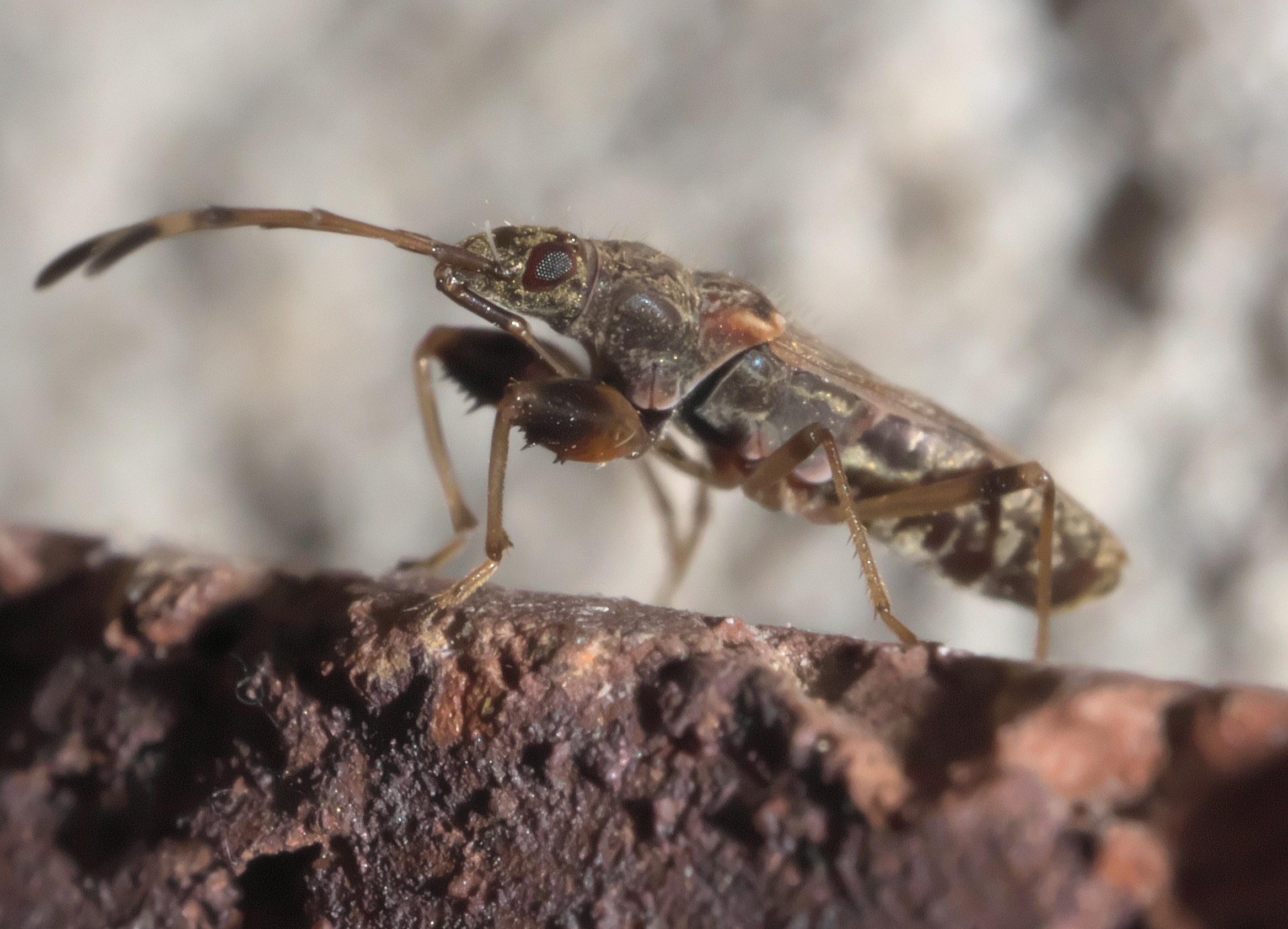

Scientific classification
- Domain: Eukaryota
- Kingdom: Animalia
- Phylum: Arthropoda
- Class: Insecta
- Order: Hemiptera
- Suborder: Heteroptera
- Family: Rhyparochromidae
- Tribe: Myodochini
- Genus: Neopamera
- Species: N. albocincta

Binomial name
- Neopamera albocincta (Barber, 1953)

= Neopamera albocincta =

Species of true bug

Neopamera albocincta is a species of dirt-colored seed bug in the family Rhyparochromidae. It is found in the Caribbean Sea, Central America, North America, and South America.

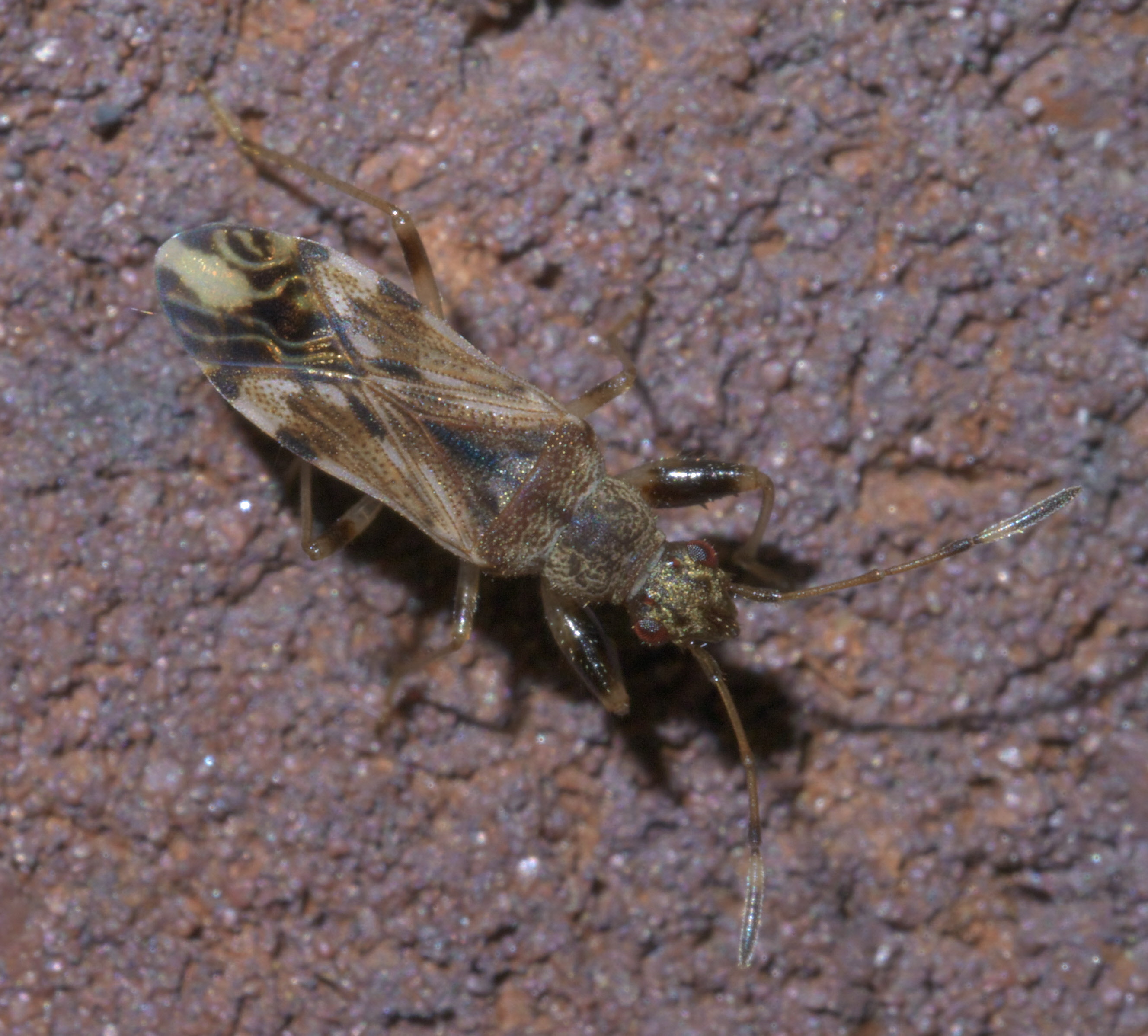
