= Slaterobius =

Scientific classification
- Domain: Eukaryota
- Kingdom: Animalia
- Phylum: Arthropoda
- Class: Insecta
- Order: Hemiptera
- Suborder: Heteroptera
- Family: Rhyparochromidae
- Subfamily: Rhyparochrominae
- Tribe: Myodochini
- Genus: Slaterobius; Harrington, 1980

Genus of true bugs

Slaterobius is a genus of dirt-colored seed bugs in the family Rhyparochromidae. There are at least four described species in Slaterobius.

== Species ==
These four species belong to the genus Slaterobius:

- Slaterobius chisos Slater, Sweet & Brailovsky, 1993
- Slaterobius insignis (Uhler, 1872)
- Slaterobius nigritus Slater, Sweet & Brailovsky, 1993
- Slaterobius quadristriatus (Barber, 1911)
