= Prytanes oblongus =

Scientific classification
- Kingdom: Animalia
- Phylum: Arthropoda
- Clade: Pancrustacea
- Class: Insecta
- Order: Hemiptera
- Suborder: Heteroptera
- Family: Rhyparochromidae
- Genus: Prytanes
- Species: P. oblongus

Binomial name
- Prytanes oblongus (Stål, 1862)

Species of true bug

Prytanes oblongus is a species of dirt-colored seed bug in the family Rhyparochromidae. It is found in the Caribbean, Central America, North America, and South America.
