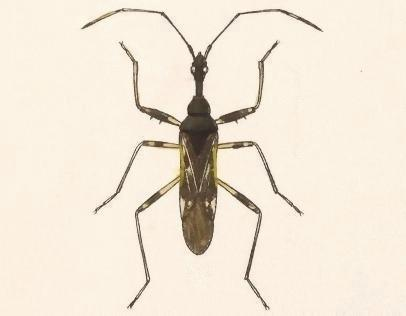
- Myodocha giraffa

Scientific classification
- Kingdom: Animalia
- Phylum: Arthropoda
- Class: Insecta
- Order: Hemiptera
- Suborder: Heteroptera
- Family: Rhyparochromidae
- Subfamily: Rhyparochrominae
- Tribe: Myodochini
- Genus: Myodocha; Latreille, 1807

Synonyms
- Chiroleptes Kirby, 1837

= Myodocha =

Genus of true bugs

Myodocha is a genus of long-necked seed bugs in the family Rhyparochromidae. There are about 10 described species in Myodocha.

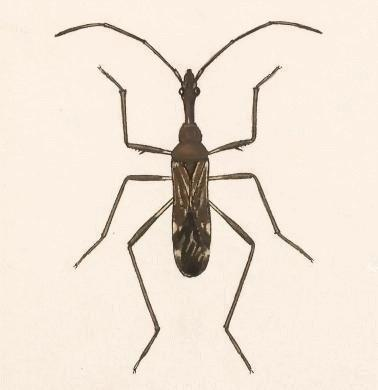
Myodocha unispinosa

== Species ==
These 10 species belong to the genus Myodocha:

- Myodocha annulicornis Blatchley, 1926 (banded long-necked seed bug)
- Myodocha froeschneri Slater, 1998
- Myodocha fulvosa Barber, 1954
- Myodocha giraffa Stal, 1862
- Myodocha intermedia Distant, 1893
- Myodocha longicollis Stal, 1874
- Myodocha parcicoma Cervantes, 2005
- Myodocha serripes Olivier, 1811 (long-necked seed bug)
- Myodocha unispinopilosa Cervantes, 2005
- Myodocha unispinosa Stal, 1874
