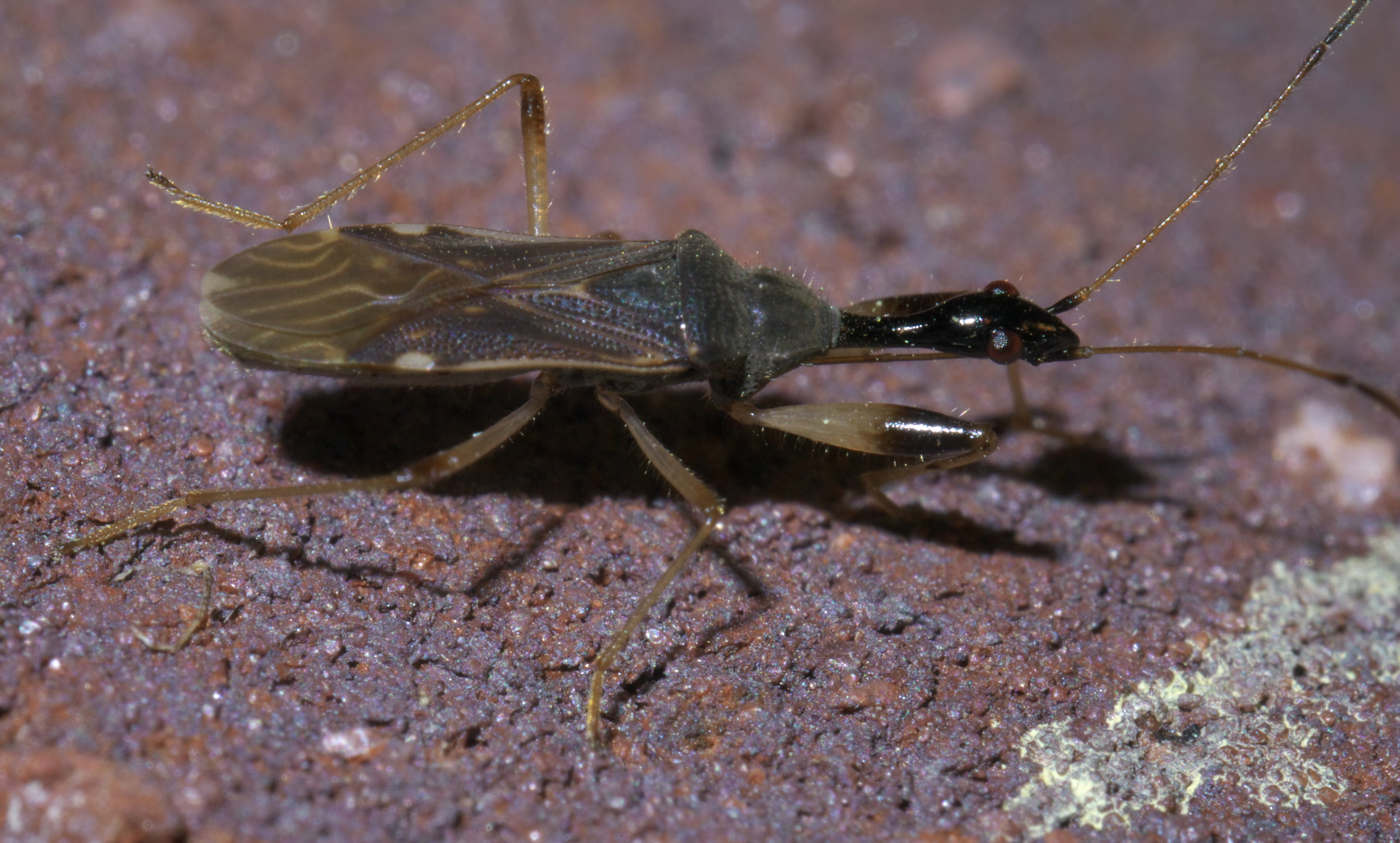

Scientific classification
- Domain: Eukaryota
- Kingdom: Animalia
- Phylum: Arthropoda
- Class: Insecta
- Order: Hemiptera
- Suborder: Heteroptera
- Family: Rhyparochromidae
- Genus: Myodocha
- Species: M. serripes

Binomial name
- Myodocha serripes Olivier, 1811

= Myodocha serripes =

Species of true bug

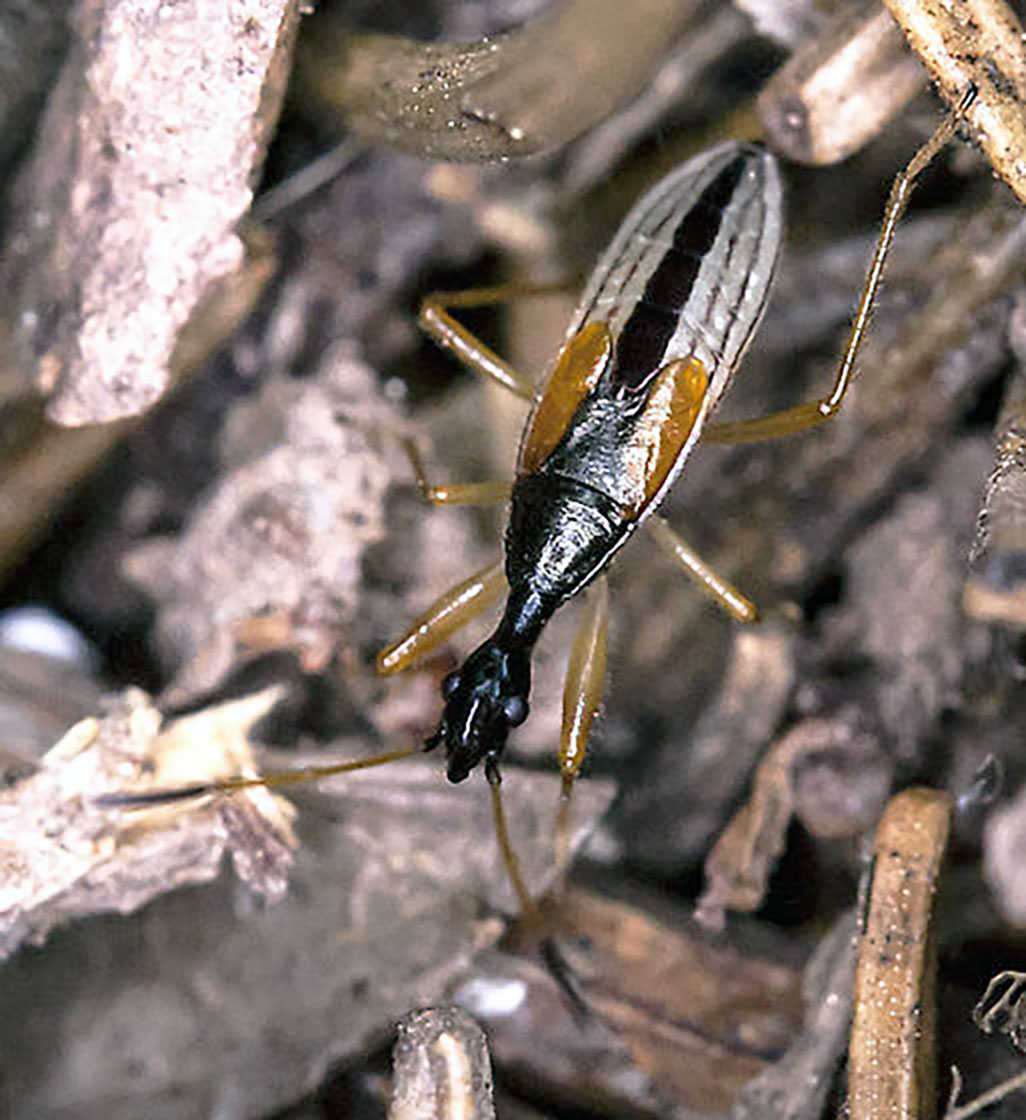
Long-necked Seed Bug (Myodocha serripes)

Myodocha serripes, the long-necked seed bug, is a species of dirt-colored seed bug in the family Rhyparochromidae. It is found in North America.

As their name suggests, this insect feeds on seeds. When hibernating, the adults will do so alone or in small groups, then migrate to fields in spring. They are most active in autumn, though those living in Florida do not hibernate at all. They are treated as pests on strawberries.
