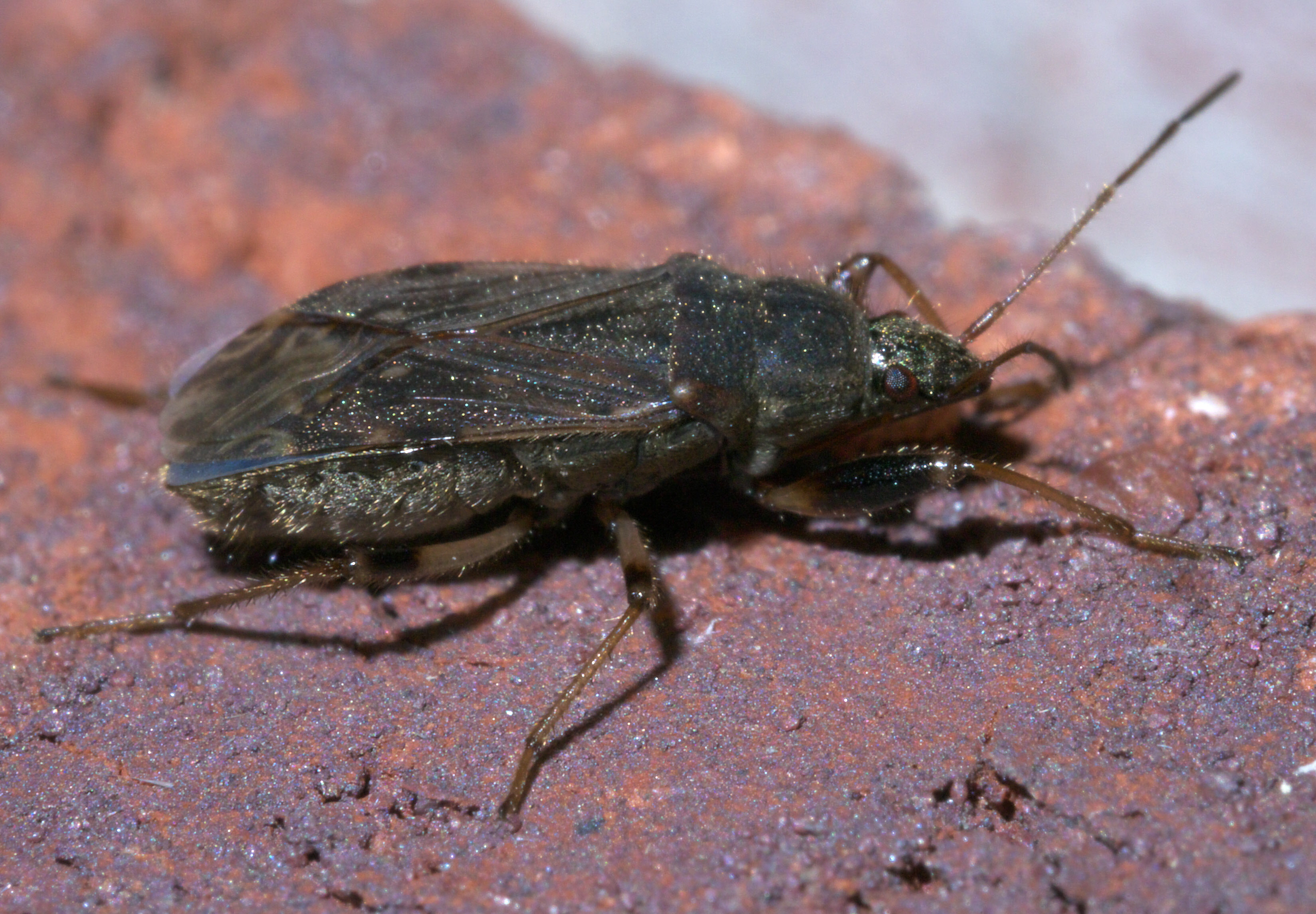

Scientific classification
- Domain: Eukaryota
- Kingdom: Animalia
- Phylum: Arthropoda
- Class: Insecta
- Order: Hemiptera
- Suborder: Heteroptera
- Family: Rhyparochromidae
- Genus: Perigenes
- Species: P. constrictus

Binomial name
- Perigenes constrictus (Say, 1832)

= Perigenes constrictus =

Species of true bug

Perigenes constrictus is a species of dirt-colored seed bug in the family Rhyparochromidae. It is found in Central America and North America.

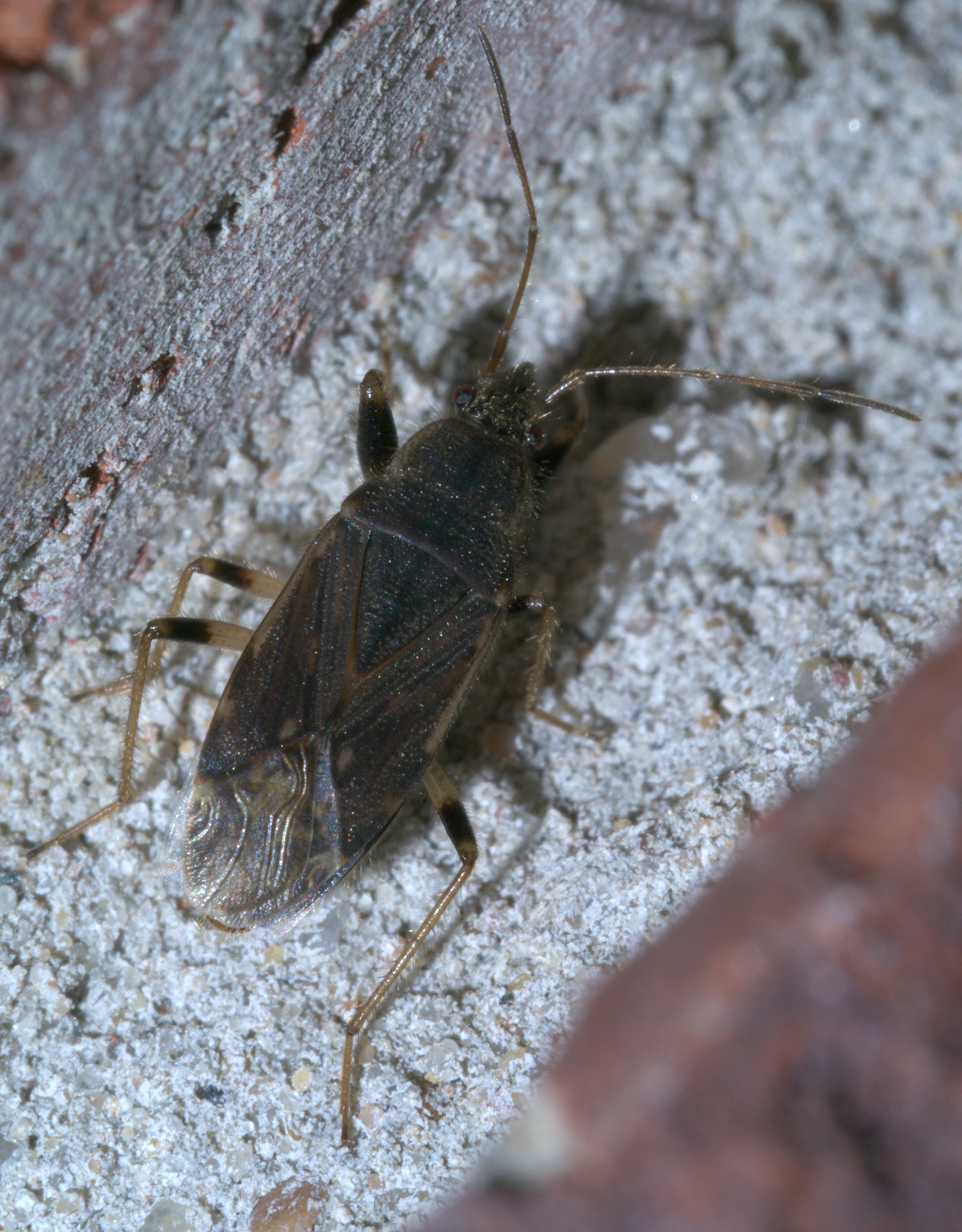
