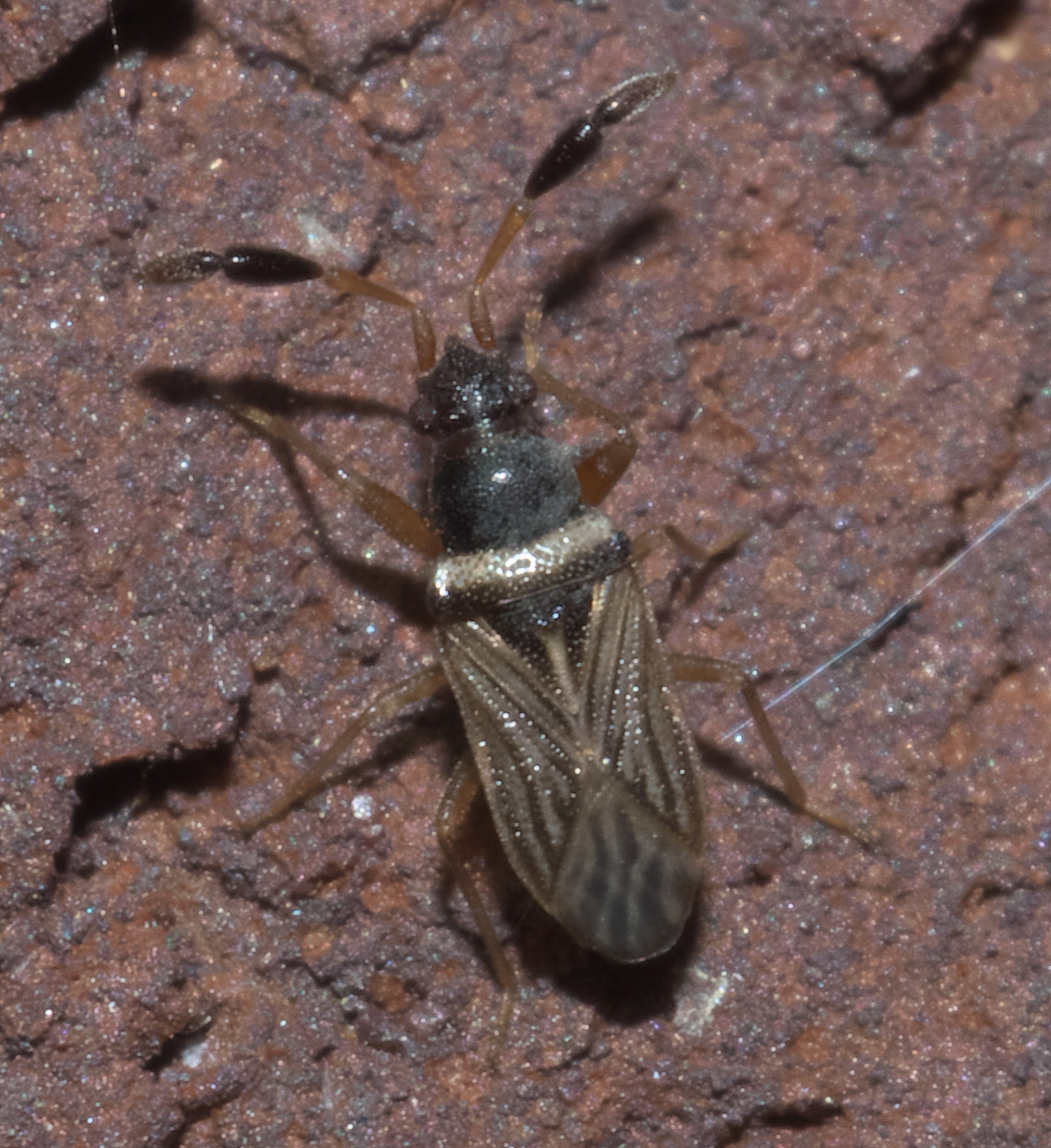
- Ptochiomera nodosa

Scientific classification
- Domain: Eukaryota
- Kingdom: Animalia
- Phylum: Arthropoda
- Class: Insecta
- Order: Hemiptera
- Suborder: Heteroptera
- Family: Rhyparochromidae
- Subfamily: Rhyparochrominae
- Tribe: Myodochini
- Genus: Ptochiomera; Say, 1831

= Ptochiomera =

Genus of true bugs

Ptochiomera is a genus of dirt-colored seed bugs in the family Rhyparochromidae. There are at least two described species in Ptochiomera.

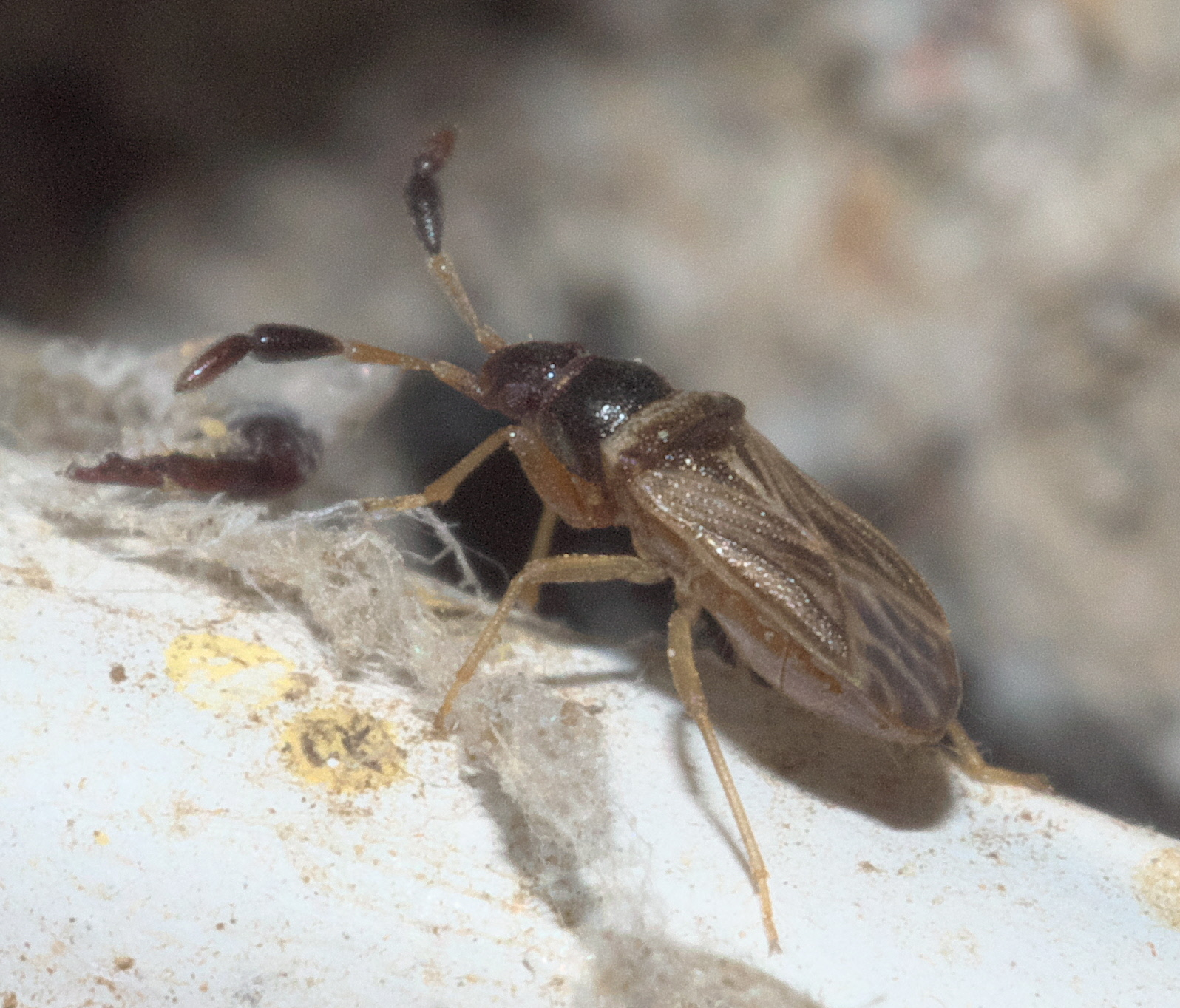
Ptochiomera nodosa

== Species ==
These two species belong to the genus Ptochiomera:

- Ptochiomera chilensis (Spinola, 1852)
- Ptochiomera nodosa Say, 1831
