= Sisamnes claviger =

Scientific classification
- Domain: Eukaryota
- Kingdom: Animalia
- Phylum: Arthropoda
- Class: Insecta
- Order: Hemiptera
- Suborder: Heteroptera
- Family: Rhyparochromidae
- Genus: Sisamnes
- Species: S. claviger

Binomial name
- Sisamnes claviger (Uhler, 1895)

Species of true bug

Sisamnes claviger is a species of seed bug in the family Rhyparochromidae. It is found in North America.
