= Zeridoneus =

Scientific classification
- Domain: Eukaryota
- Kingdom: Animalia
- Phylum: Arthropoda
- Class: Insecta
- Order: Hemiptera
- Suborder: Heteroptera
- Family: Rhyparochromidae
- Subfamily: Rhyparochrominae
- Tribe: Myodochini
- Genus: Zeridoneus; Barber, 1918

Genus of true bugs

Zeridoneus is a genus of dirt-colored seed bugs in the family Rhyparochromidae. There are at least three described species in Zeridoneus.

== Species ==
These three species belong to the genus Zeridoneus:

- Zeridoneus costalis (Van Duzee, 1909)
- Zeridoneus knulli Barber, 1948
- Zeridoneus petersoni Reichart, 1966
