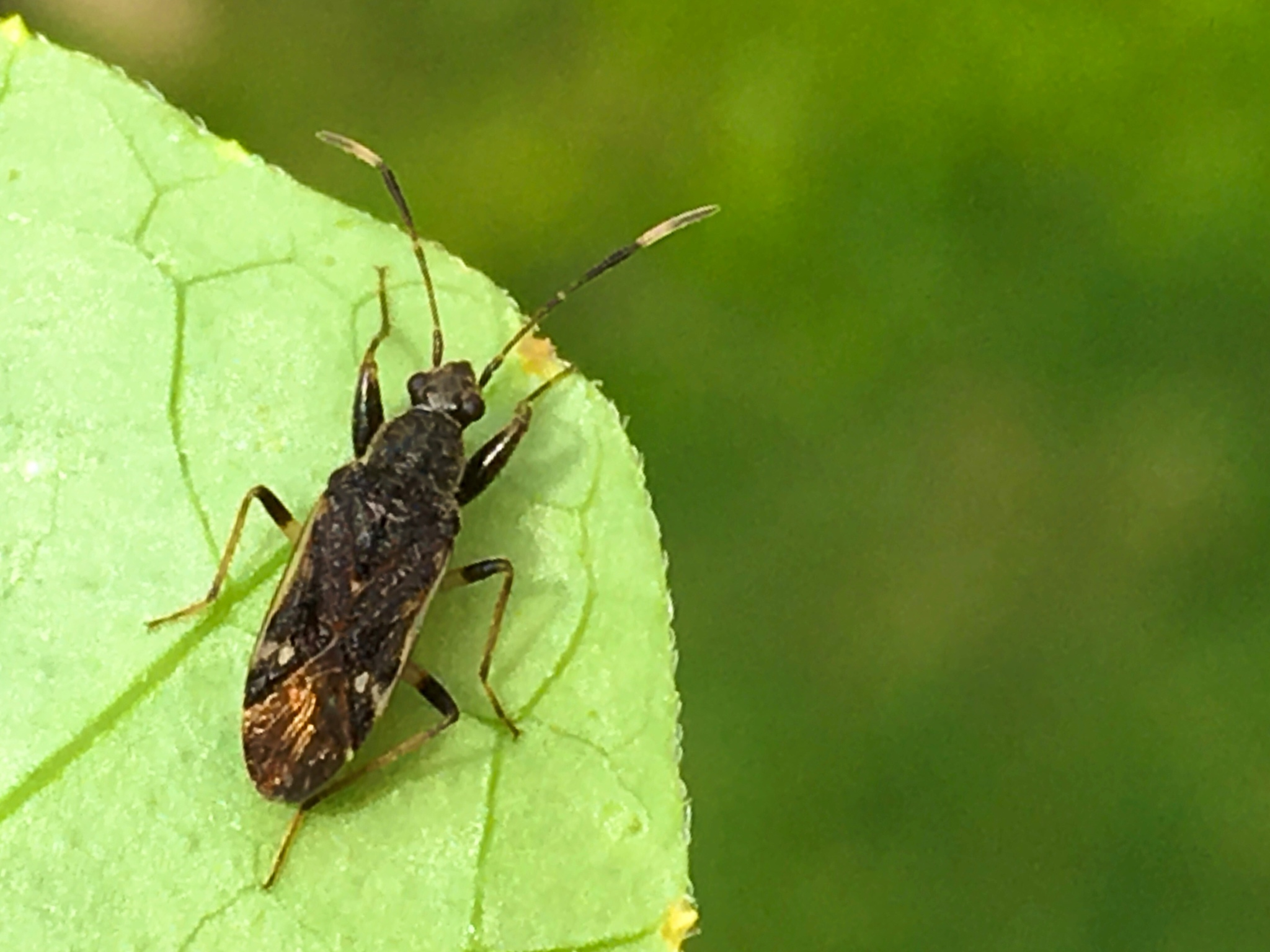
- Horridipamera nietneri, Philippines

Scientific classification
- Domain: Eukaryota
- Kingdom: Animalia
- Phylum: Arthropoda
- Class: Insecta
- Order: Hemiptera
- Suborder: Heteroptera
- Family: Rhyparochromidae
- Subfamily: Rhyparochrominae
- Tribe: Myodochini
- Genus: Horridipamera; Malipatil, 1978

= Horridipamera =

Genus of insects

Horridipamera is a genus of dirt-colored seed bugs in the family Rhyparochromidae. There are about 13 described species in Horridipamera.

== Species ==
These 13 species belong to the genus Horridipamera:

- Horridipamera bergrothi (Horvath, 1892)
- Horridipamera cantrelli Malipatil, 1978
- Horridipamera compacta Slater & Zheng, 1985
- Horridipamera emersoni (Distant, 1909)
- Horridipamera ferruginosa (Stal, 1874)
- Horridipamera inconspicua (Dallas, 1852)
- Horridipamera lateralis (Scott, 1874)
- Horridipamera medleri Slater & Zheng, 1985
- Horridipamera nietneri (Dohrn, 1860)
- Horridipamera perlongus Scudder, 1971
- Horridipamera pullatus (Hesse, 1925)
- Horridipamera robusta Malipatil, 1978
- Horridipamera subsericeus (Breddin, 1907)
