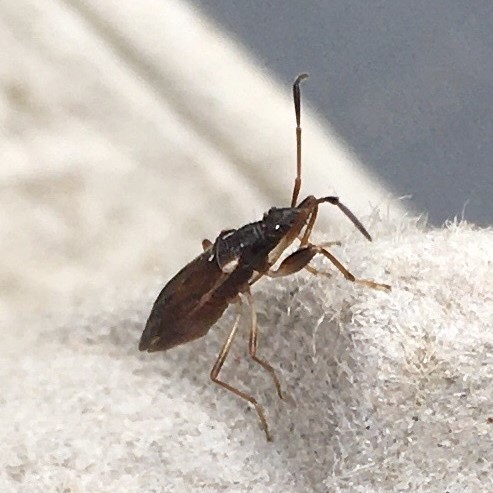

Scientific classification
- Domain: Eukaryota
- Kingdom: Animalia
- Phylum: Arthropoda
- Class: Insecta
- Order: Hemiptera
- Suborder: Heteroptera
- Family: Rhyparochromidae
- Tribe: Myodochini
- Genus: Pseudocnemodus; Barber, 1911
- Species: P. canadensis

Binomial name
- Pseudocnemodus canadensis (Provancher, 1885-1890)

= Pseudocnemodus =

Pseudocnemodus canadensis

Monotypic genus of true bugs

Pseudocnemodus is a monotypic genus of dirt-colored seed bugs in the family Rhyparochromidae. Its sole described species is P. canadensis.
