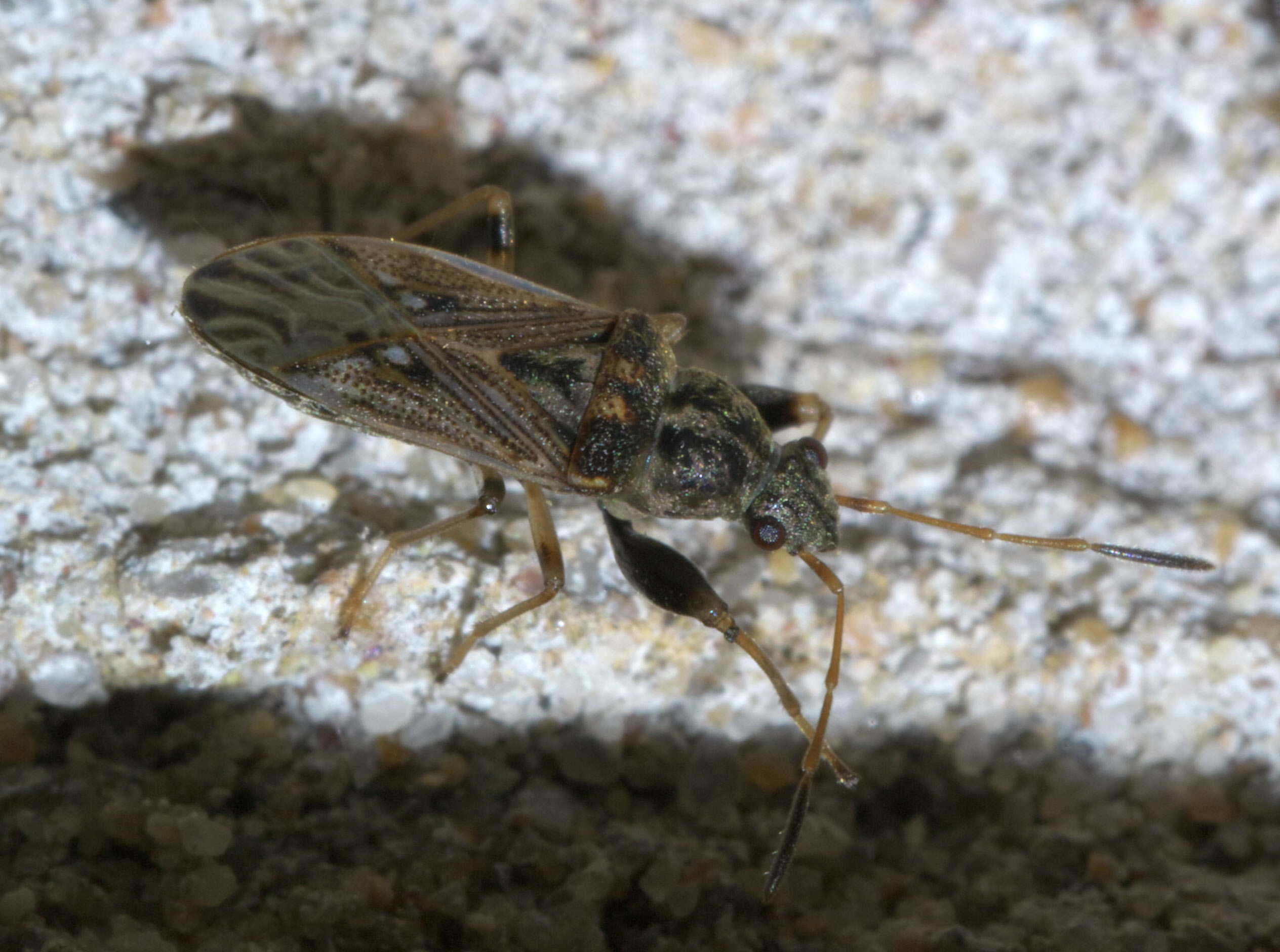
- Pseudopachybrachius basalis

Scientific classification
- Domain: Eukaryota
- Kingdom: Animalia
- Phylum: Arthropoda
- Class: Insecta
- Order: Hemiptera
- Suborder: Heteroptera
- Family: Rhyparochromidae
- Subfamily: Rhyparochrominae
- Tribe: Myodochini
- Genus: Pseudopachybrachius; Malipatil, 1978

= Pseudopachybrachius =

Genus of true bugs

Pseudopachybrachius is a genus of dirt-colored seed bugs in the family Rhyparochromidae. There are about eight described species in Pseudopachybrachius.

== Species ==
These eight species belong to the genus Pseudopachybrachius:

- Pseudopachybrachius basalis (Dallas, 1852)
- Pseudopachybrachius capicolus (Stal, 1874)
- Pseudopachybrachius concepcioni Zheng & Slater, 1984
- Pseudopachybrachius guttus (Dallas, 1852)
- Pseudopachybrachius nesovinctus Ashlock, 1972
- Pseudopachybrachius reductus (Walker, 1872)
- Pseudopachybrachius undulatus (Dohrn, 1860)
- Pseudopachybrachius vinctus (Say, 1831)
