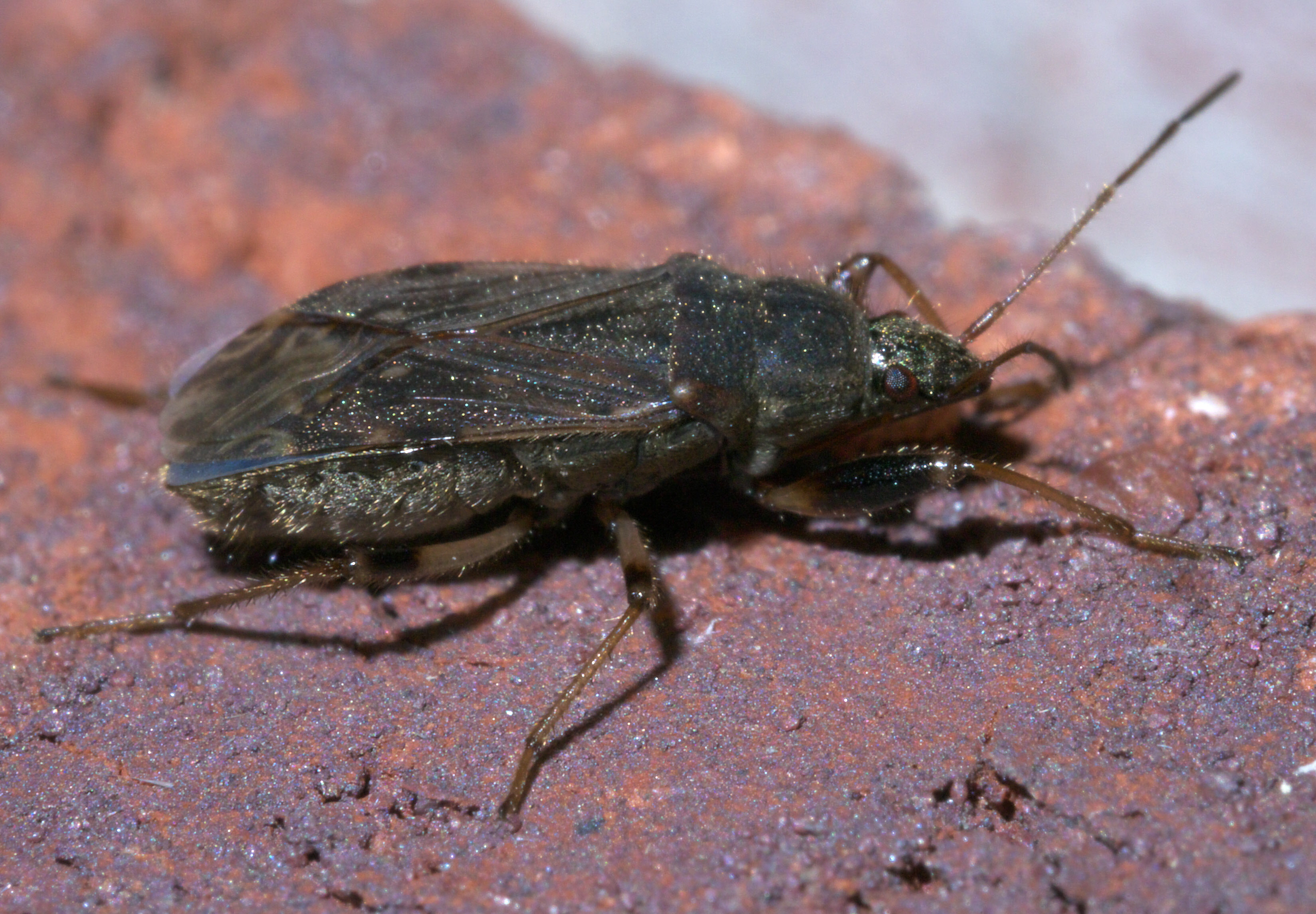
- Perigenes constrictus

Scientific classification
- Domain: Eukaryota
- Kingdom: Animalia
- Phylum: Arthropoda
- Class: Insecta
- Order: Hemiptera
- Suborder: Heteroptera
- Family: Rhyparochromidae
- Subfamily: Rhyparochrominae
- Tribe: Myodochini
- Genus: Perigenes; Distant, 1893

= Perigenes =

Genus of true bugs

Perigenes is a genus of dirt-colored seed bugs in the family Rhyparochromidae. There are at least three described species in Perigenes.

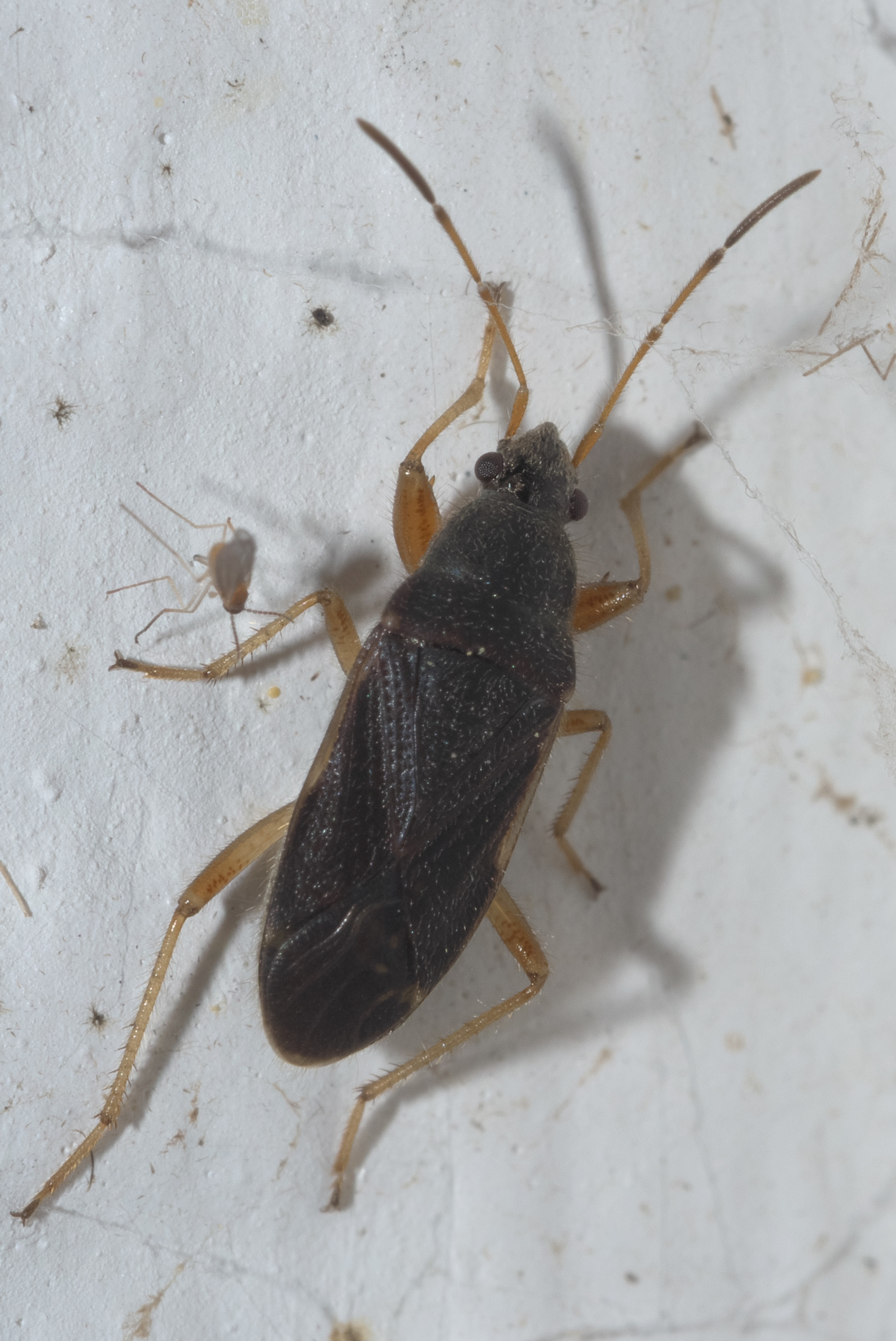
Perigenes similis

== Species ==
These three species belong to the genus Perigenes:

- Perigenes constrictus (Say, 1831)
- Perigenes dispositus Distant, 1893
- Perigenes similis Barber, 1906
