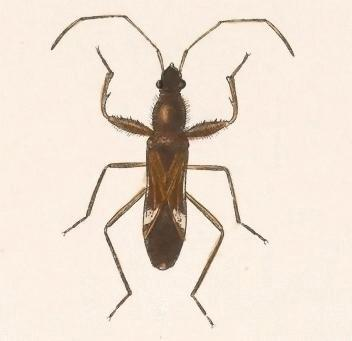

Scientific classification
- Domain: Eukaryota
- Kingdom: Animalia
- Phylum: Arthropoda
- Class: Insecta
- Order: Hemiptera
- Suborder: Heteroptera
- Family: Rhyparochromidae
- Genus: Pseudopamera
- Species: P. aurivilliana

Binomial name
- Pseudopamera aurivilliana Distant, 1882

= Pseudopamera aurivilliana =

Species of true bug

Pseudopamera aurivilliana is a species of dirt-colored seed bug in the family Rhyparochromidae. It is found in Central America and North America.
