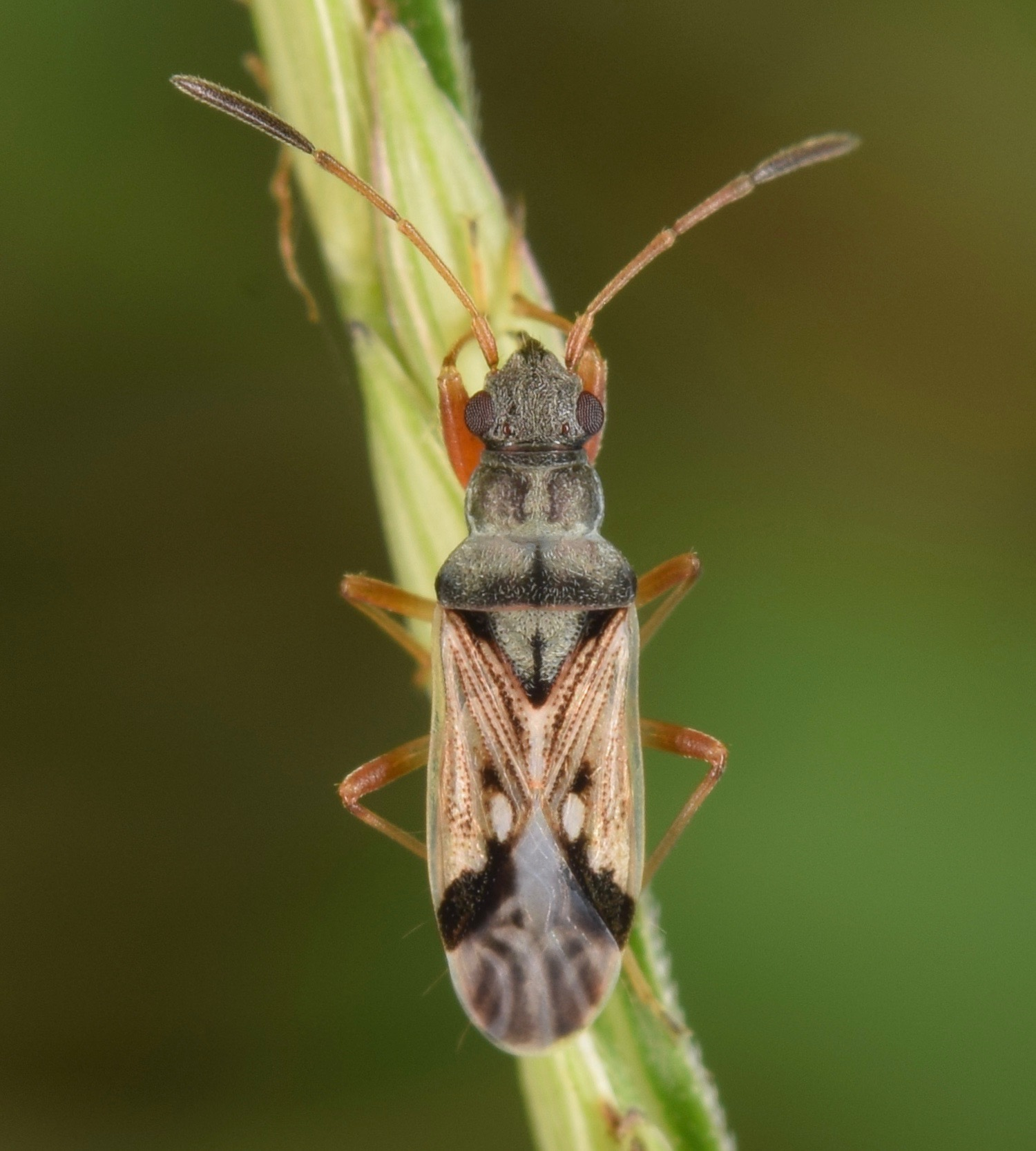

Scientific classification
- Domain: Eukaryota
- Kingdom: Animalia
- Phylum: Arthropoda
- Class: Insecta
- Order: Hemiptera
- Suborder: Heteroptera
- Family: Rhyparochromidae
- Genus: Pseudopachybrachius
- Species: P. vinctus

Binomial name
- Pseudopachybrachius vinctus (Say, 1831)

= Pseudopachybrachius vinctus =

Species of true bug

Pseudopachybrachius vinctus is a species of dirt-colored seed bug in the family Rhyparochromidae. It is found in the Caribbean, Central America, North America, Oceania, and South America.
