= Myodocha longicollis =

Scientific classification
- Domain: Eukaryota
- Kingdom: Animalia
- Phylum: Arthropoda
- Class: Insecta
- Order: Hemiptera
- Suborder: Heteroptera
- Family: Rhyparochromidae
- Genus: Myodocha
- Species: M. longicollis

Binomial name
- Myodocha longicollis Stal, 1874

Synonyms
- Myodocha serripes Stal, 1862

Species of insect

Myodocha longicollis is a species of long-necked seed bug found in Central and South America
