= Kolenetrus =

Scientific classification
- Domain: Eukaryota
- Kingdom: Animalia
- Phylum: Arthropoda
- Class: Insecta
- Order: Hemiptera
- Suborder: Heteroptera
- Family: Rhyparochromidae
- Tribe: Myodochini
- Genus: Kolenetrus; Barber, 1918
- Species: K. plenus

Binomial name
- Kolenetrus plenus (Distant, 1893)

Genus of true bugs

Kolenetrus is a genus of dirt-colored seed bugs in the family Rhyparochromidae. There is one described species in Kolenetrus, K. plenus.
