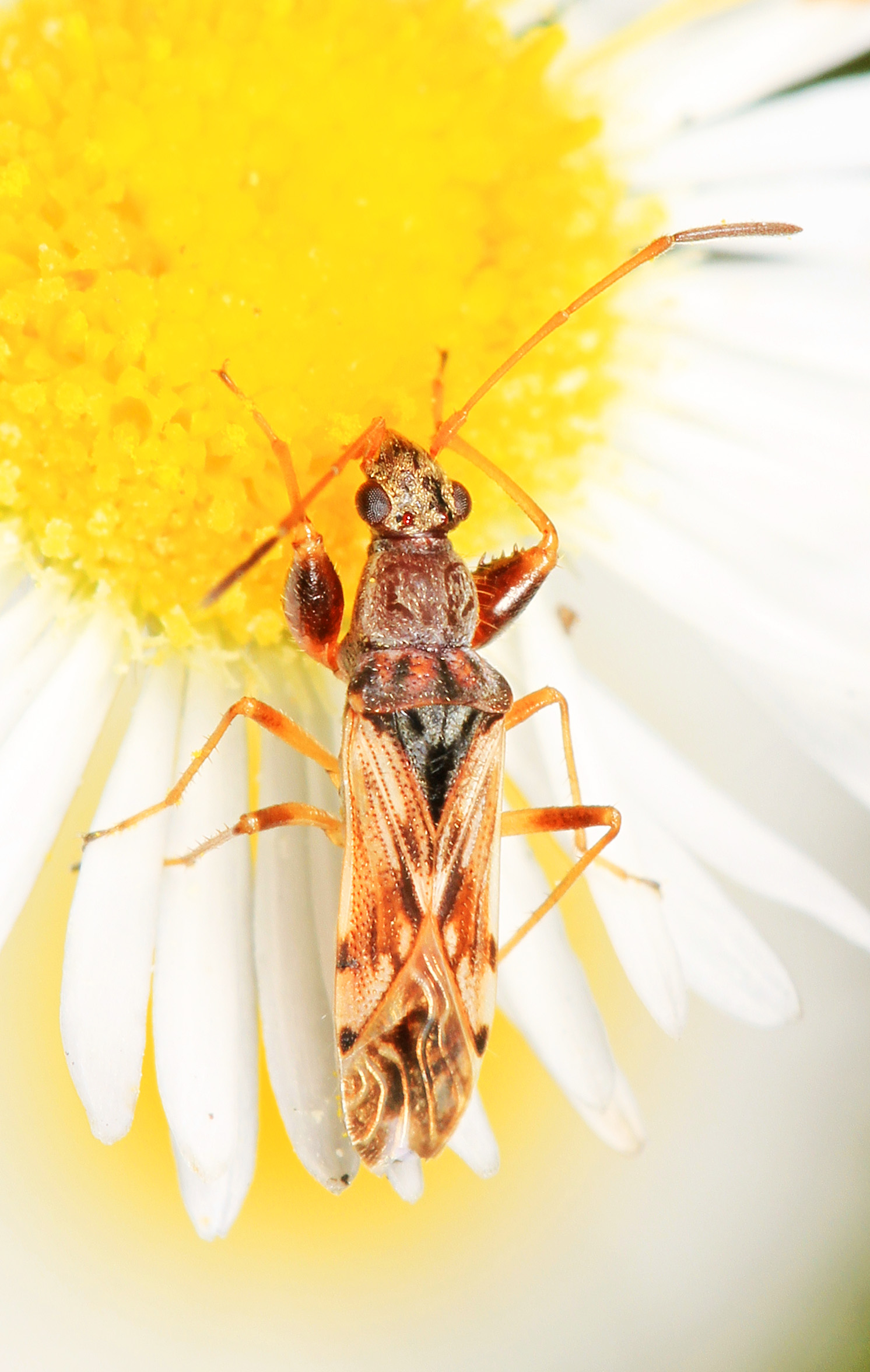

Scientific classification
- Domain: Eukaryota
- Kingdom: Animalia
- Phylum: Arthropoda
- Class: Insecta
- Order: Hemiptera
- Suborder: Heteroptera
- Family: Rhyparochromidae
- Genus: Neopamera
- Species: N. bilobata

Binomial name
- Neopamera bilobata (Say, 1832)

Synonyms
- Pamera bilobata Say, 1832

= Neopamera bilobata =

Species of true bug

Neopamera bilobata is a species of dirt-colored seed bug in the family Rhyparochromidae. It is found in the Caribbean Sea, Central America, North America, and South America.

== Subspecies ==
These two subspecies belong to the species Neopamera bilobata:

- Neopamera bilobata bilobata (Say, 1831)
- Neopamera bilobata lineata (Dallas, 1852)
