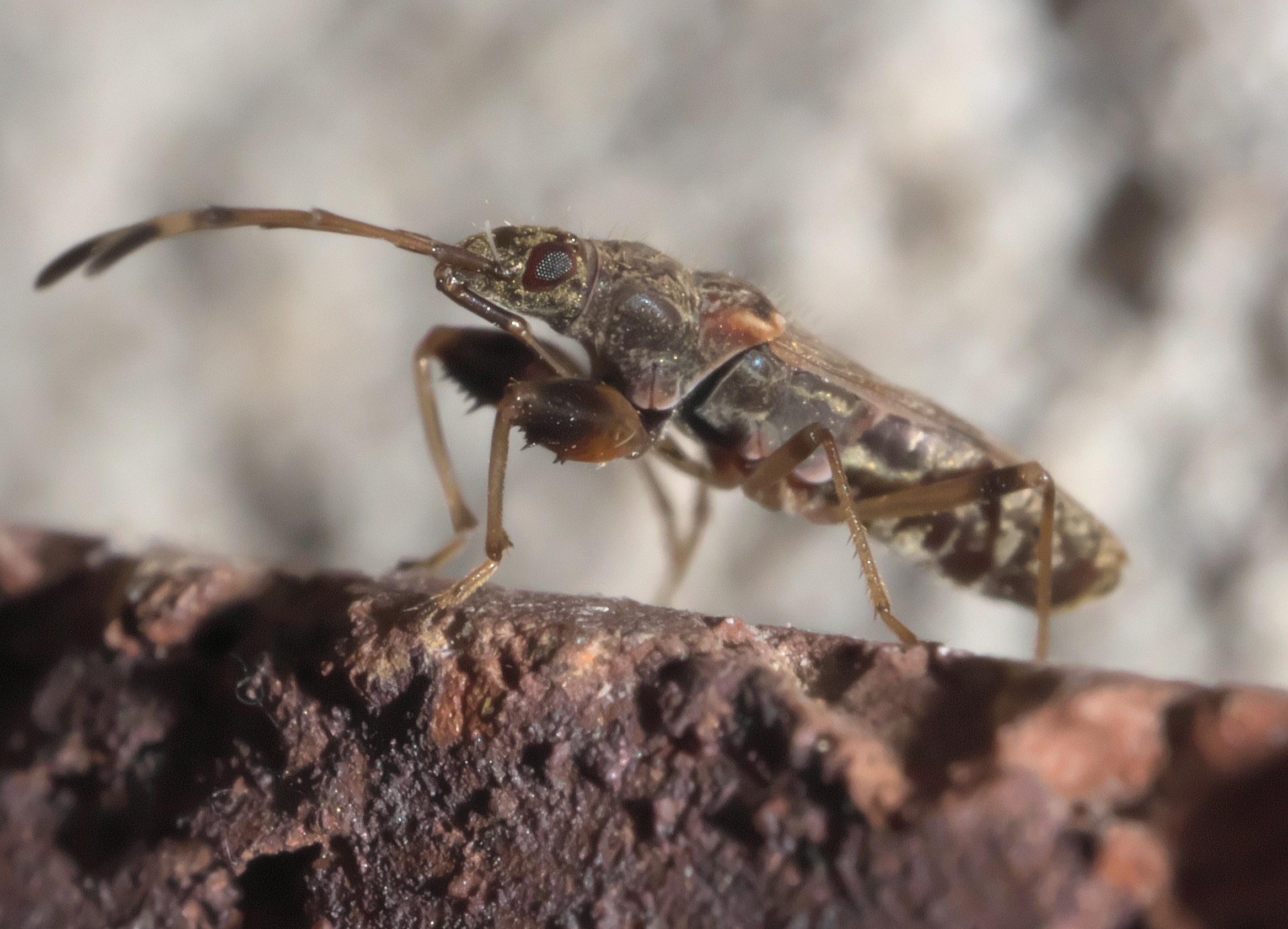
- Neopamera albocincta

Scientific classification
- Domain: Eukaryota
- Kingdom: Animalia
- Phylum: Arthropoda
- Class: Insecta
- Order: Hemiptera
- Suborder: Heteroptera
- Family: Rhyparochromidae
- Subfamily: Rhyparochrominae
- Tribe: Myodochini
- Genus: Neopamera; Harrington, 1980

= Neopamera =

Genus of true bugs

Neopamera is a genus of dirt-colored seed bugs in the family Rhyparochromidae. There are about 16 described species in Neopamera.

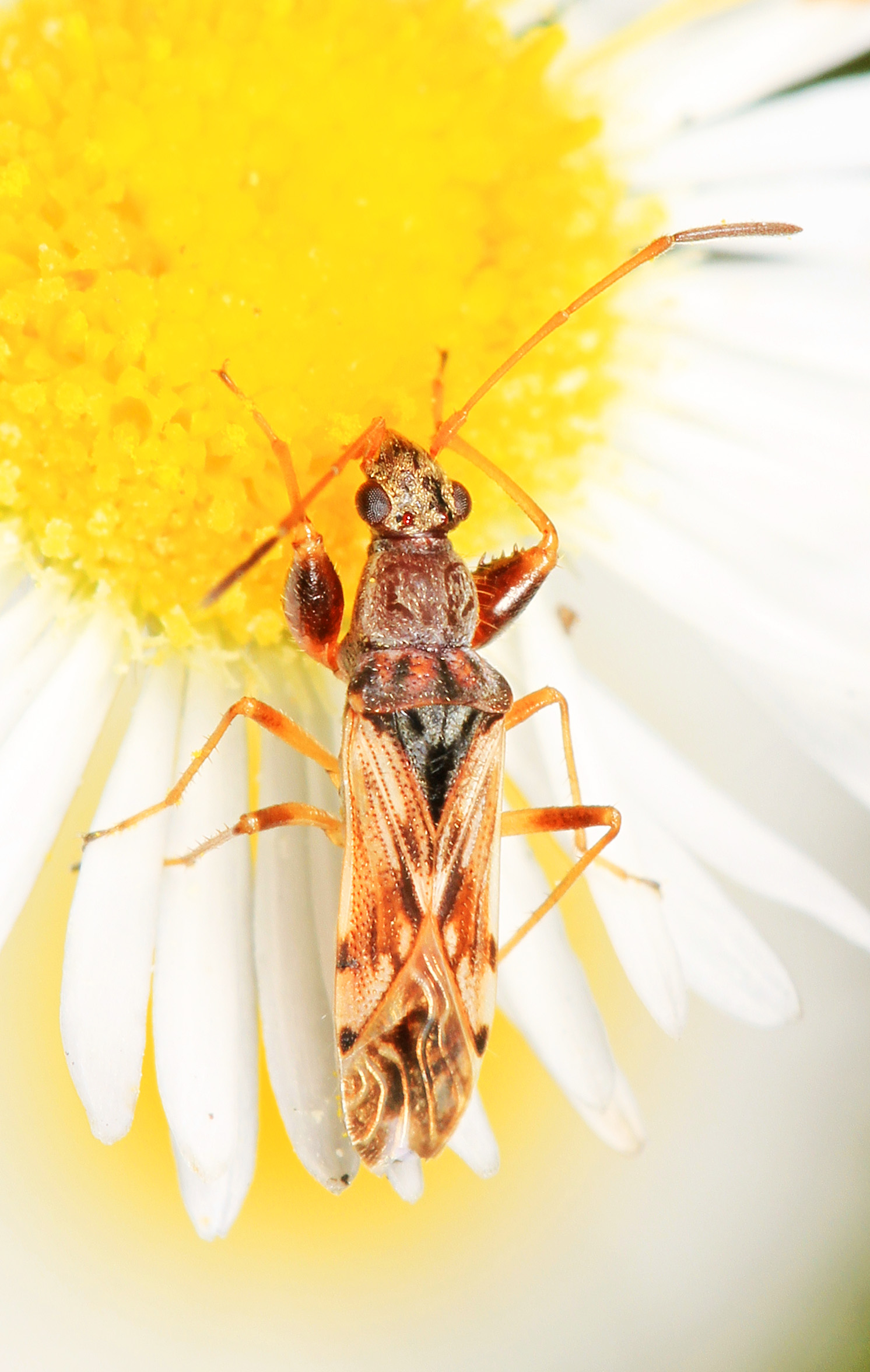
Neopamera bilobata

== Species ==
These 16 species belong to the genus Neopamera:

- Neopamera albocincta (Barber, 1953)
- Neopamera bilobata (Say, 1831)
- Neopamera costalis (Stal, 1874)
- Neopamera crassicornis (Stal, 1874)
- Neopamera hondurana (Bergroth, 1914)
- Neopamera insularis (Barber, 1925)
- Neopamera intermedia (Barber, 1924)
- Neopamera neotropicalis (Kirkaldy, 1909)
- Neopamera pagana (White, 1879)
- Neopamera platana (Bergroth, 1894)
- Neopamera recincta (Breddin, 1901)
- Neopamera serripes (Walker, 1872)
- Neopamera tineodes (Burmeister, 1835)
- Neopamera tuberculata (Osborn, 1904)
- Neopamera vicaria (Barber, 1954)
- Neopamera vivida (Distant, 1893)
