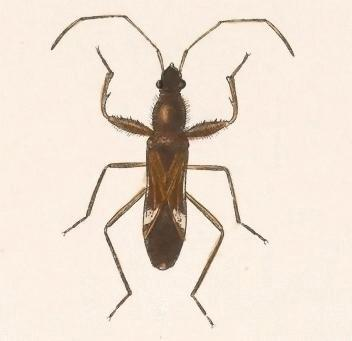
- Pseudopamera aurivilliana

Scientific classification
- Domain: Eukaryota
- Kingdom: Animalia
- Phylum: Arthropoda
- Class: Insecta
- Order: Hemiptera
- Suborder: Heteroptera
- Family: Rhyparochromidae
- Subfamily: Rhyparochrominae
- Tribe: Myodochini
- Genus: Pseudopamera; Distant, 1893

= Pseudopamera =

Genus of true bugs

Pseudopamera is a genus of dirt-colored seed bugs in the family Rhyparochromidae. There are about nine described species in Pseudopamera.

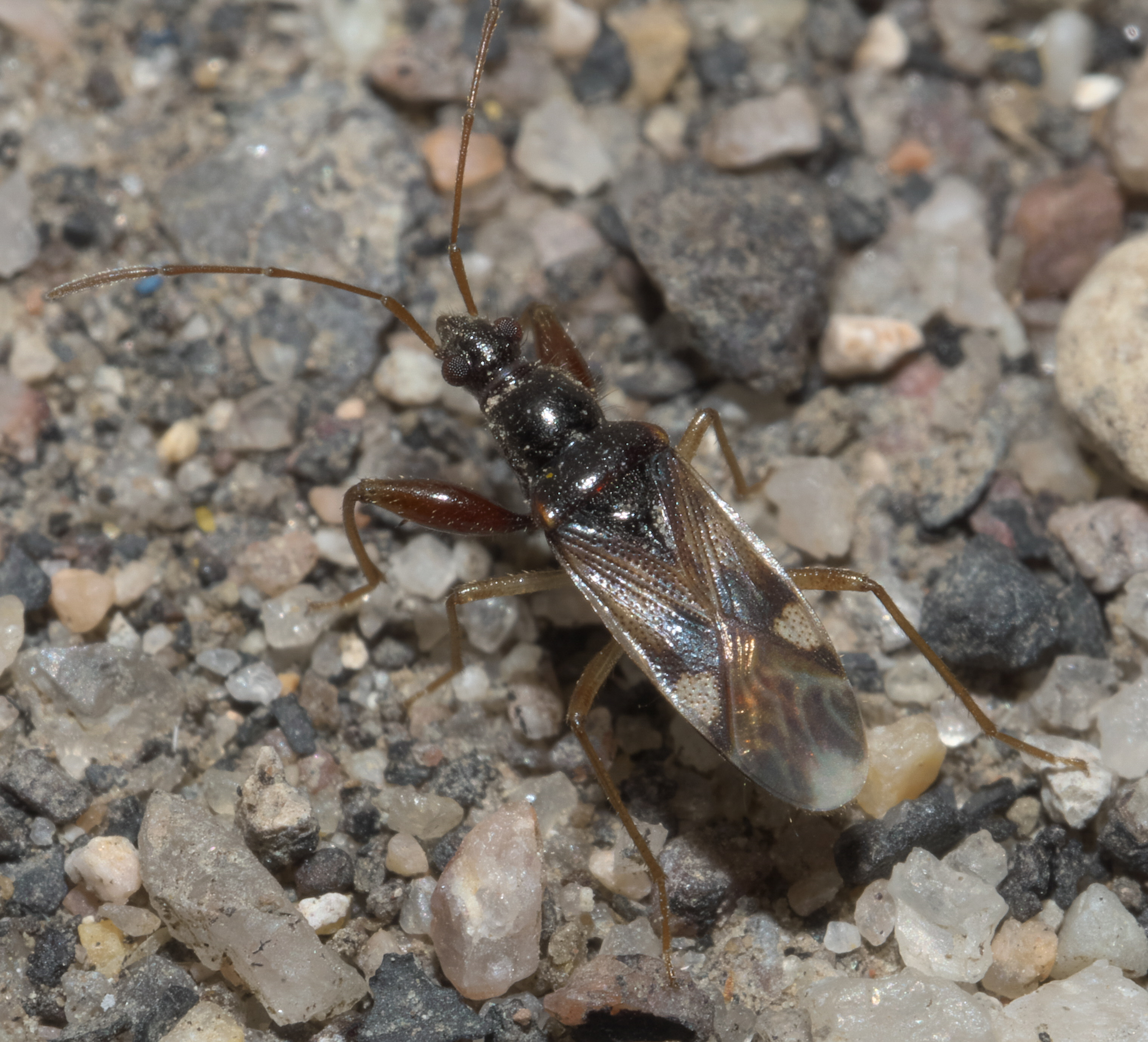
Pseudopamera nitidula

== Species ==
These nine species belong to the genus Pseudopamera:

- Pseudopamera ater (Distant, 1893)
- Pseudopamera aurivilliana Distant, 1893
- Pseudopamera coleoptrata Brailovsky, 1989
- Pseudopamera coloradensis (Barber, 1921)
- Pseudopamera insititia (Distant, 1893)
- Pseudopamera nitidicollis (Stal, 1874)
- Pseudopamera nitidula (Uhler, 1893)
- Pseudopamera rubricata (Barber, 1921)
- Pseudopamera setosa (Stal, 1874)
