= Cnemodus =

Scientific classification
- Domain: Eukaryota
- Kingdom: Animalia
- Phylum: Arthropoda
- Class: Insecta
- Order: Hemiptera
- Suborder: Heteroptera
- Family: Rhyparochromidae
- Subfamily: Rhyparochrominae
- Tribe: Myodochini
- Genus: Cnemodus; Herrich-Schaeffer, 1850

Genus of true bugs

Cnemodus is a genus of dirt-colored seed bugs in the family Rhyparochromidae. There are at least two described species in Cnemodus.

== Species ==
These two species belong to the genus Cnemodus:

- Cnemodus hirtipes Blatchley, 1924
- Cnemodus mavortius (Say, 1831)
