= Prytanes confusus =

Scientific classification
- Domain: Eukaryota
- Kingdom: Animalia
- Phylum: Arthropoda
- Class: Insecta
- Order: Hemiptera
- Suborder: Heteroptera
- Family: Rhyparochromidae
- Genus: Prytanes
- Species: P. confusus

Binomial name
- Prytanes confusus (Barber, 1953)

Species of true bug

Prytanes confusus is a species of dirt-colored seed bug in the family Rhyparochromidae. It is found in the Caribbean, Central America, North America, and South America.
