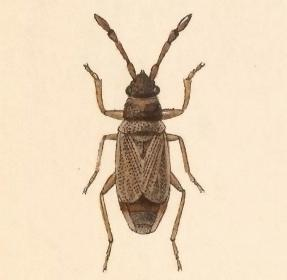

Scientific classification
- Domain: Eukaryota
- Kingdom: Animalia
- Phylum: Arthropoda
- Class: Insecta
- Order: Hemiptera
- Suborder: Heteroptera
- Family: Rhyparochromidae
- Genus: Sisamnes
- Species: S. contractus

Binomial name
- Sisamnes contractus Distant, 1893

= Sisamnes contractus =

Species of true bug

Sisamnes contractus is a species of dirt-colored seed bug in the family Rhyparochromidae. It is found in Central America and North America.
