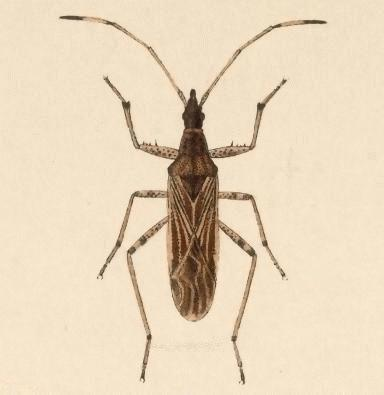
- Catenes porrectus

Scientific classification
- Domain: Eukaryota
- Kingdom: Animalia
- Phylum: Arthropoda
- Class: Insecta
- Order: Hemiptera
- Suborder: Heteroptera
- Family: Rhyparochromidae
- Subfamily: Rhyparochrominae
- Tribe: Myodochini; Boitard, 1827

= Myodochini =

Tribe of true bugs

Myodochini is a tribe of dirt-colored seed bugs in the family Rhyparochromidae. There are more than 80 genera and 370 described species in Myodochini.

== Ecology ==
Bugs in this tribe are generally found on the ground or in litter underneath plants. Some species climb vegetation when mature seeds are available. Other species live above ground on weedy vegetation.

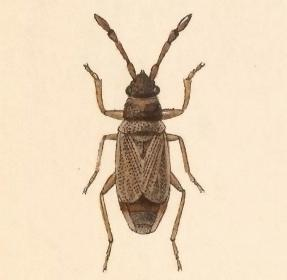
Sisamnes contractus

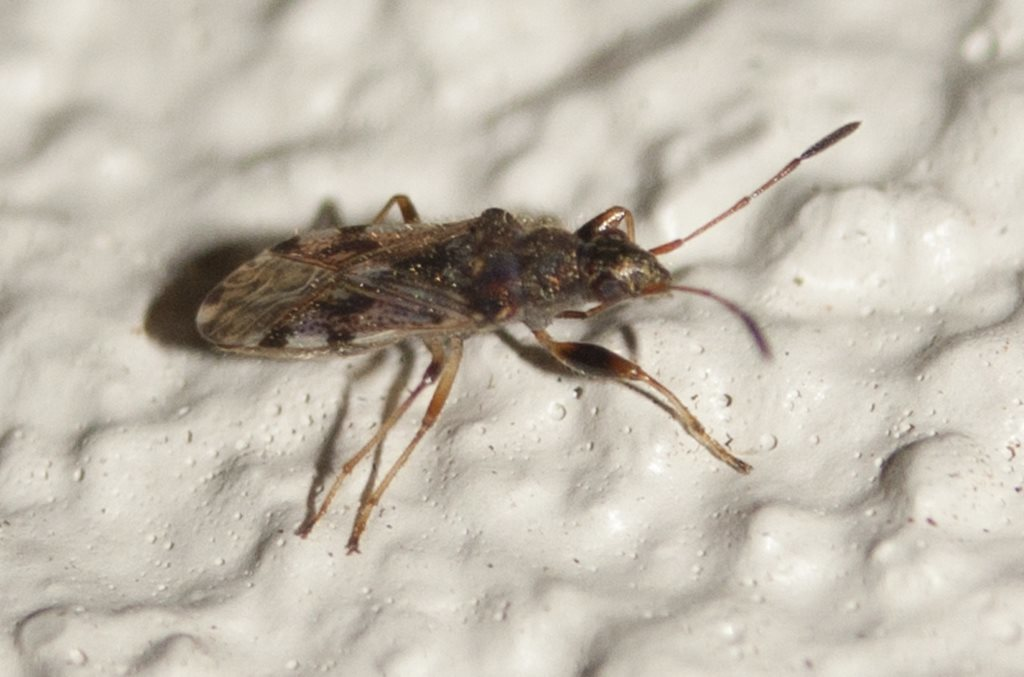
Remaudiereana inornata

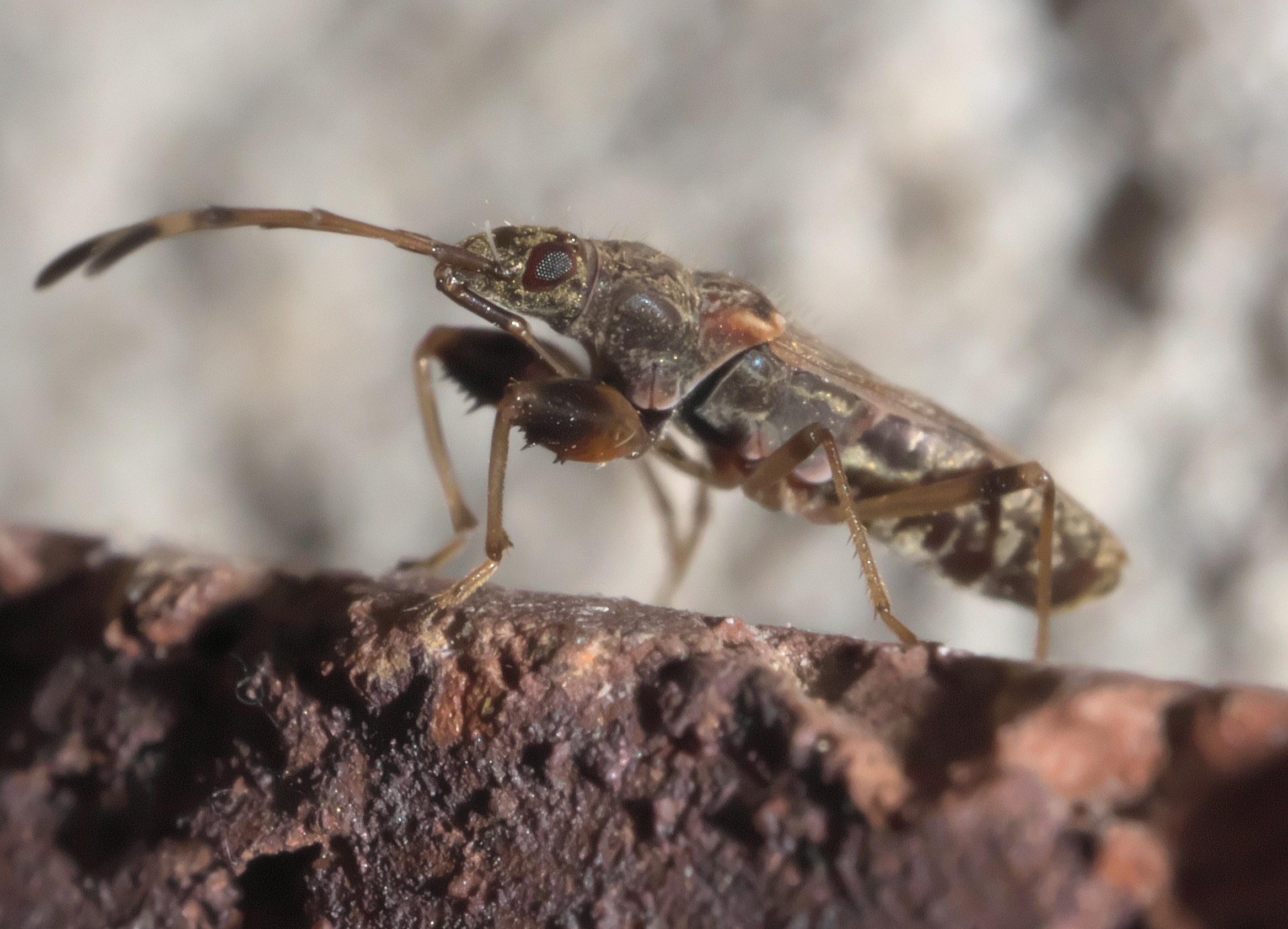
Neopamera albocincta

== Genera ==
These 88 genera belong to the tribe Myodochini:

- Acrolophyses Dellapé & Henry, 2010
- Aegyptocoris China, 1936
- Afrovertanus Scudder, 1962
- Andercnemodus Brailovsky & Cervantes, 2011
- Ashlockaria Harrington, 1980
- Bacacephalus Harrington, 1980
- Baranowskiobius Dellapé, Melo & Henry, 2016
- Bergicoris Dellapé, 2010
- Caenopamera Barber, 1918
- Carpilis Stal, 1874
- Catenes Distant, 1893
- Cholula Distant, 1893
- Cnemodus Herrich-Schaeffer, 1850
- Distingphyses Scudder, 1962
- Dushinckanus Brailovsky, 1979
- Ereminellus Harrington, 1980
- Erlacda Signoret, 1863
- Eucosmetus Bergroth, 1894
- Euparomius Hedge, 1990
- Exopamera Distant, 1918
- Exopamerana Malipatil, 1978
- Fontathanus Scudder, 1963
- Froeschneria Harrington, 1980
- Gyndes Stal, 1862
- Henicopamerana Malipatil, 1986
- Henicorthaea Malipatil, 1978
- Henryaria Dellapé, Melo & Montemayor, 2018
- Heraeus Stal, 1862
- Horridipamera Malipatil, 1978
- Humilocoris Harrington, 1980
- Incrassoceps Scudder, 1978
- Kolenetrus Barber, 1918
- Ligyrocoris Stal, 1872
- Megacholula Harrington, 1980
- Megapamera Scudder, 1975
- Mimobius Poppius & Bergroth, 1921
- Myodacanthus Dellapé, 2012
- Myodocha Latreille, 1807 (long-necked seed bugs)
- Myodorthaea Malipatil, 1978
- Neocnemodus Dellapé & Malipatil, 2012
- Neomyocoris Dellapé & Montemayor, 2008
- Neopamera Harrington, 1980
- Orthaea Dallas, 1852
- Pachybrachius Hahn, 1826
- Paisana Dellapé, 2008
- Pamerana Distant, 1909
- Pamerapa Malipatil, 1978
- Pamerarma Malipatil, 1978
- Paracholula Harrington, 1980
- Paraheraeus Dellapé, Melo & Henry, 2016
- Parapamerana Malipatil, 1980
- Paraparomius Harrington, 1980
- Paromius Fieber, 1861
- Pephysena Distant, 1893
- Perigenes Distant, 1893
- Prytanes Distant, 1893
- Pseudocnemodus Barber, 1911
- Pseudolaryngodus Malipatil & Gao, 2019
- Pseudopachybrachius Malipatil, 1978
- Pseudopamera Distant, 1893
- Pseudoparomius Harrington, 1980
- Ptochiomera Say, 1831
- Remaudiereana Hoberlandt, 1954
- Scintillocoris Slater & Brailovsky, 1993
- Shinckadunus Dellapé & Melo, 2020
- Sisamnes Distant, 1893
- Slaterobius Harrington, 1980
- Stalaria Harrington, 1980
- Stigmatonotum Lindberg, 1927
- Stridulocoris Harrington, 1980
- Suffenus Distant, 1904
- Tenuicoris Slater & Harrington, 1974
- Thoraea Dellapé & Montemayor, 2011
- Togo Bergroth, 1906
- Valonetus Barber, 1918
- Villalobosothignus Brailovsky, 1984
- Woodwardocoris Malipatil, 1978
- Xenydrium Poppius & Bergroth, 1921
- Zeridoneus Barber, 1918
- Zeropamera Barber, 1948
- † Catopamera Scudder, 1890
- † Cophocoris Scudder, 1890
- † Ctereacoris Scudder, 1890
- † Eucorites Scudder, 1890
- † Lithocoris Scudder, 1890
- † Phrudopamera Scudder, 1890
- † Procoris Scudder, 1890
- † Stenopamera Scudder, 1890
