= Ozophora burmeisteri =

Scientific classification
- Domain: Eukaryota
- Kingdom: Animalia
- Phylum: Arthropoda
- Class: Insecta
- Order: Hemiptera
- Suborder: Heteroptera
- Family: Rhyparochromidae
- Tribe: Ozophorini
- Genus: Ozophora
- Species: O. burmeisteri

Binomial name
- Ozophora burmeisteri (Guerin-Meneville, 1857)

Species of true bug

Ozophora burmeisteri is a species of dirt-colored seed bug in the family Rhyparochromidae. It is found in Central America and North America.
