= Ozophora laticephala =

Scientific classification
- Domain: Eukaryota
- Kingdom: Animalia
- Phylum: Arthropoda
- Class: Insecta
- Order: Hemiptera
- Suborder: Heteroptera
- Family: Rhyparochromidae
- Tribe: Ozophorini
- Genus: Ozophora
- Species: O. laticephala

Binomial name
- Ozophora laticephala Slater & O'Donnell, 1979

Species of true bug

Ozophora laticephala is a species of dirt-colored seed bug in the family Rhyparochromidae. It is found in the Caribbean Sea and North America.
