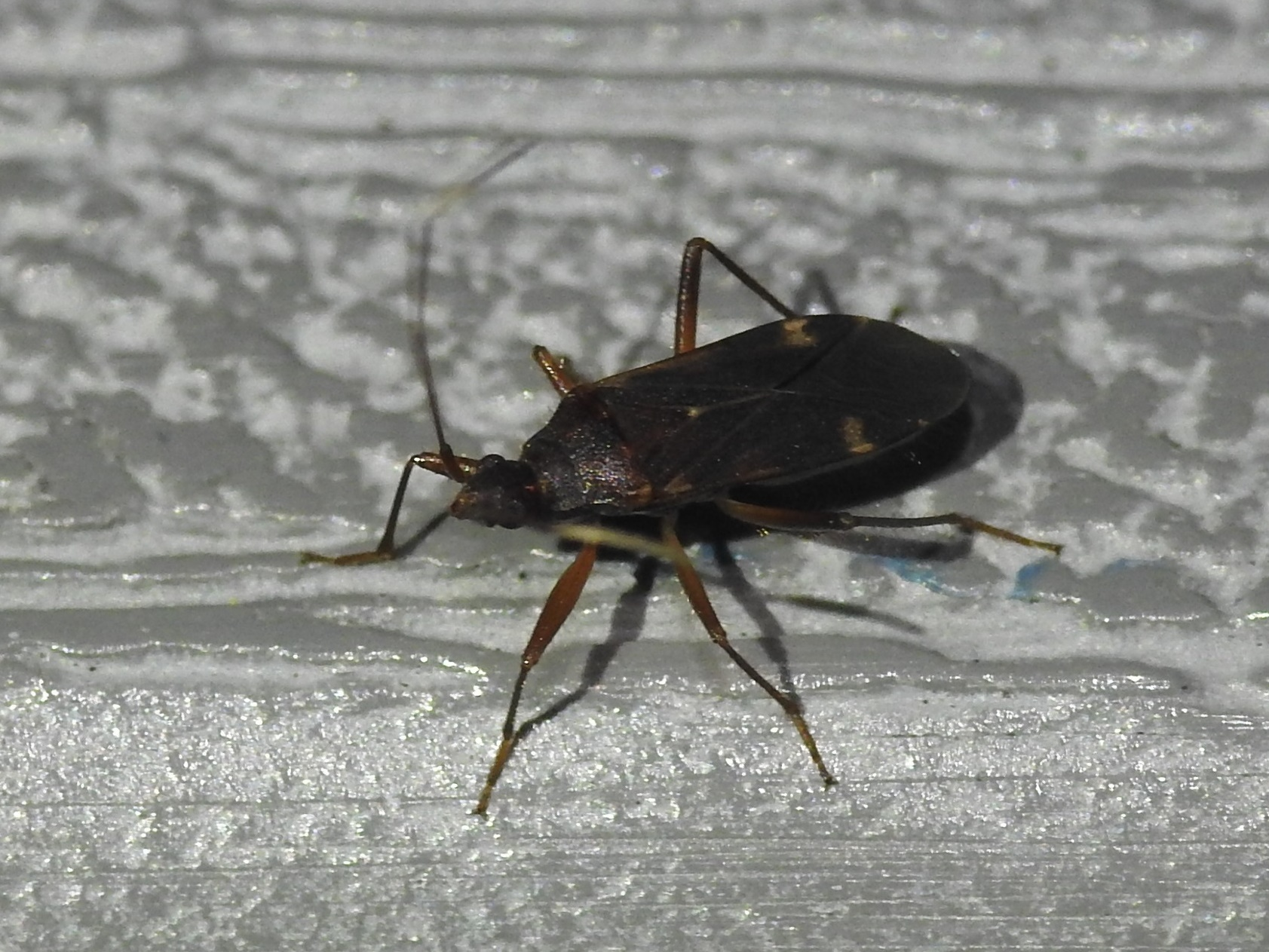

Scientific classification
- Domain: Eukaryota
- Kingdom: Animalia
- Phylum: Arthropoda
- Class: Insecta
- Order: Hemiptera
- Suborder: Heteroptera
- Family: Rhyparochromidae
- Tribe: Ozophorini
- Genus: Ozophora
- Species: O. trinotata

Binomial name
- Ozophora trinotata Barber, 1914

= Ozophora trinotata =

Species of true bug

Ozophora trinotata is a species of dirt-colored seed bug in the family Rhyparochromidae. It is found in North America.
