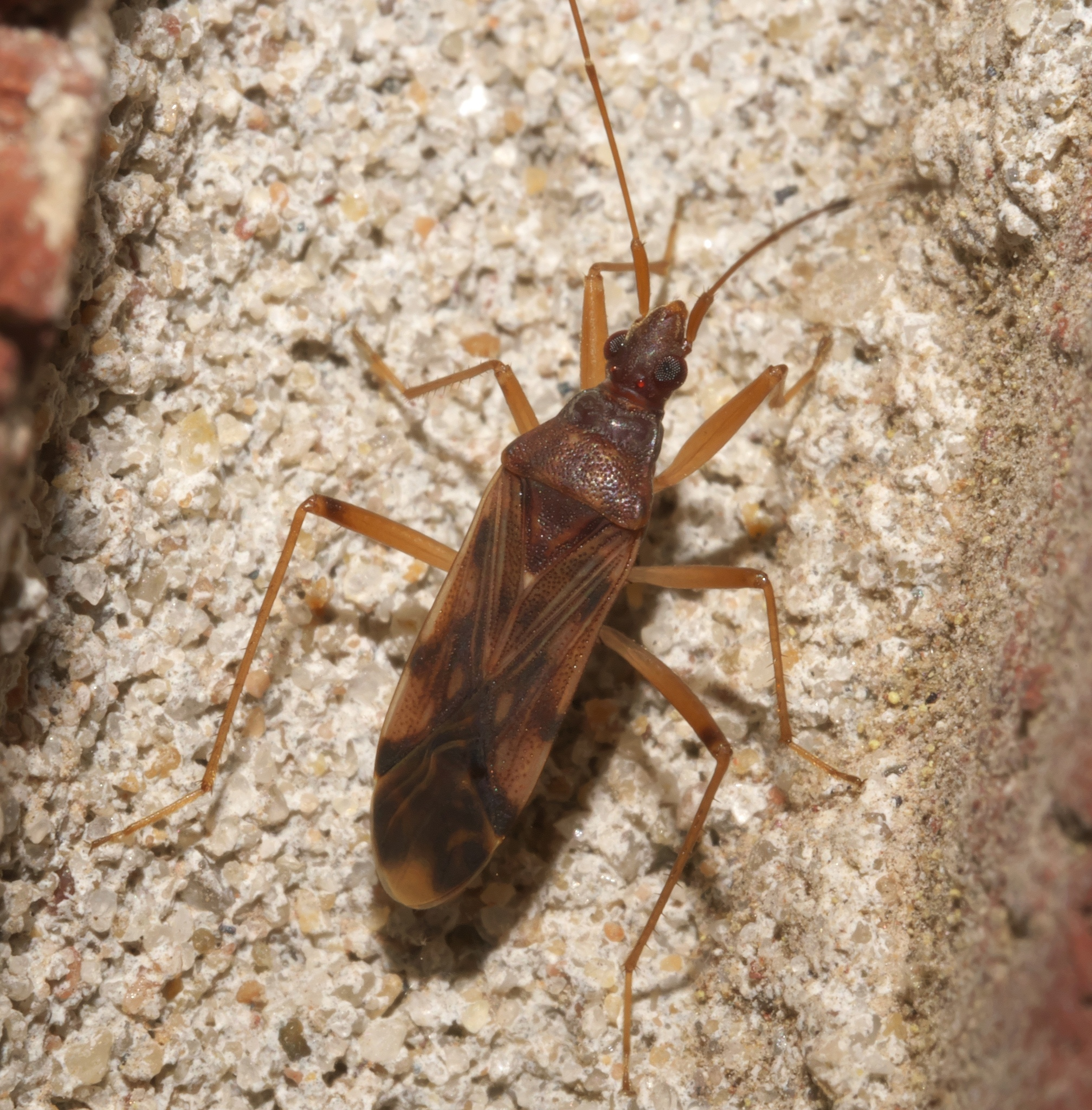
- Ozophora depicturata, Oklahoma

Scientific classification
- Domain: Eukaryota
- Kingdom: Animalia
- Phylum: Arthropoda
- Class: Insecta
- Order: Hemiptera
- Suborder: Heteroptera
- Family: Rhyparochromidae
- Tribe: Ozophorini
- Genus: Ozophora
- Species: O. depicturata

Binomial name
- Ozophora depicturata Barber, 1928

= Ozophora depicturata =

Species of true bug

Ozophora depicturata is a species of dirt-colored seed bug in the family Rhyparochromidae. It is found in North America.
