= Balboa ampliata =

Scientific classification
- Domain: Eukaryota
- Kingdom: Animalia
- Phylum: Arthropoda
- Class: Insecta
- Order: Hemiptera
- Suborder: Heteroptera
- Family: Rhyparochromidae
- Genus: Balboa
- Species: B. ampliata

Binomial name
- Balboa ampliata (Barber, 1918)

Species of true bug

Balboa ampliata is a species of dirt-colored seed bug in the family Rhyparochromidae. It is found in North America.
