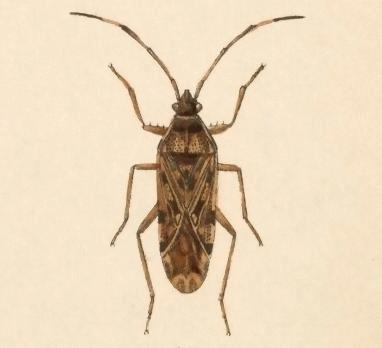
- Balboa variabilis

Scientific classification
- Domain: Eukaryota
- Kingdom: Animalia
- Phylum: Arthropoda
- Class: Insecta
- Order: Hemiptera
- Suborder: Heteroptera
- Family: Rhyparochromidae
- Tribe: Ozophorini
- Genus: Balboa; Distant, 1893

= Balboa (bug) =

Genus of true bugs

Balboa is a genus of dirt-colored seed bugs in the family Rhyparochromidae. There are at least three described species in Balboa.

== Species ==
These three species belong to the genus Balboa:

- Balboa ampliata (Barber, 1918)
- Balboa germana (Distant, 1893)
- Balboa variabilis Distant, 1893
