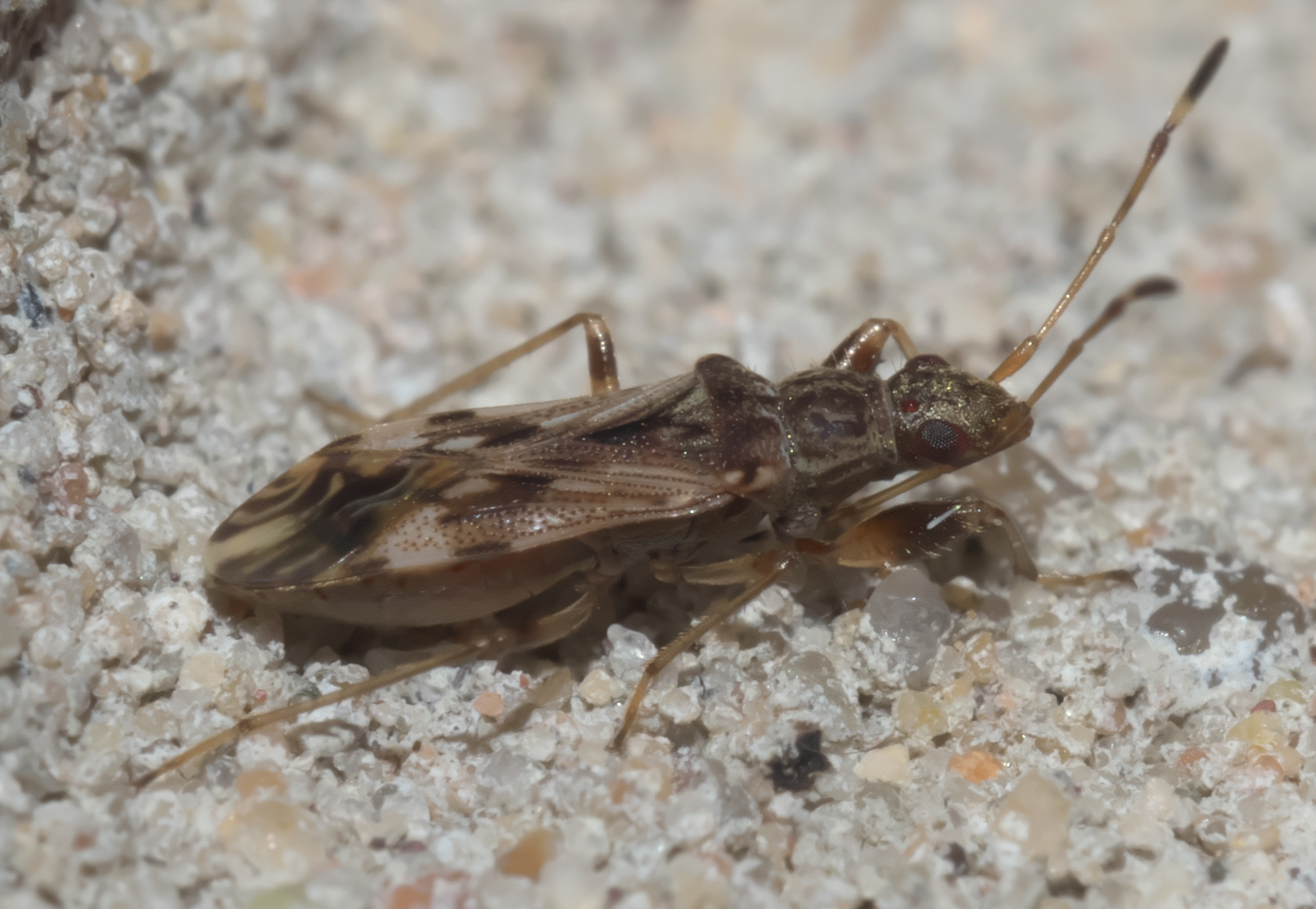
- Ozophora picturata

Scientific classification
- Domain: Eukaryota
- Kingdom: Animalia
- Phylum: Arthropoda
- Class: Insecta
- Order: Hemiptera
- Suborder: Heteroptera
- Family: Rhyparochromidae
- Subfamily: Rhyparochrominae
- Tribe: Ozophorini
- Genus: Ozophora; Uhler, 1871

Diversity
- at least 100 species

Synonyms
- Peggichisme Kirkaldy, 1904

= Ozophora =

Genus of true bugs

Ozophora is a genus of dirt-colored seed bugs in the family Rhyparochromidae. There are more than 100 described species in Ozophora.

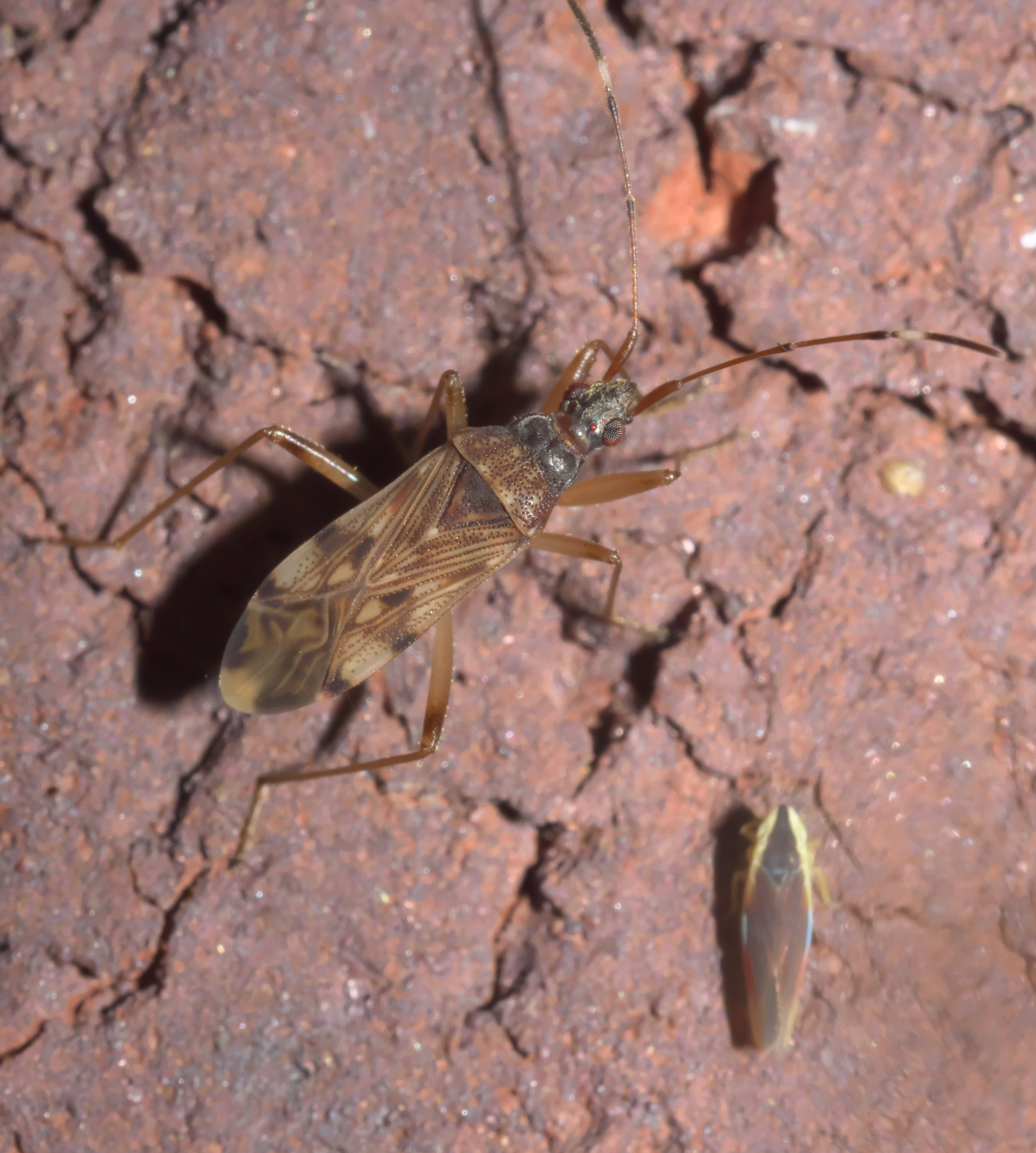
Ozophora picturata

== Species ==
The following species are accepted within Ozophora:

- Ozophora agilis Slater, 1987
- Ozophora alayoi Slater, 1990
- Ozophora anguillensis Baranowski, 2005
- Ozophora angustata Barber, 1948
- Ozophora antennata Slater & O'Donnell, 1979
- Ozophora archboldi Slater, 1987
- Ozophora atropicta Barber, 1939
- Ozophora atropictoides Slater & Baranowski, 1995
- Ozophora attagenis Slater, 1983
- Ozophora auroseta Baranowski, 2005
- Ozophora australis Slater, 1995
- Ozophora badia Slater, 1995
- Ozophora baranowskii Slater & O'Donnell, 1979
- Ozophora barbudensis Baranowski, 2005
- Ozophora belezei Slater, 1995
- Ozophora brunnea Slater, 1983
- Ozophora burmeisteri (Guerin-Meneville, 1857)
- Ozophora cacumena Slater, 2005
- Ozophora caliginosa Slater, 1990
- Ozophora caribbae Baranowski & Slater, 1984
- Ozophora caroli Slater & Baranowski, 1983
- Ozophora carvalhoi Slater & O'Donnell, 1979
- Ozophora caymana Baranowski, 2005
- Ozophora cobbeni Scudder, 1984
- Ozophora cocosensis Slater, 1981
- Ozophora coleoptrata Slater, 1990
- Ozophora concava (Distant, 1893)
- Ozophora consanguinea (Distant, 1893)
- Ozophora costaricensis Slater & O'Donnell, 1979
- Ozophora cubensis Barber, 1954
- Ozophora cuscoensis Slater, 1995
- Ozophora darlingtoni Slater, 1990
- Ozophora decora Slater, 1995
  - Ozophora decora decora Slater, 1995
  - Ozophora decora surinamensis Slater, 1995
- Ozophora depicturata Barber, 1928
- Ozophora divaricata Barber, 1954
- Ozophora dolichocephala Slater, 1995
- Ozophora dolicorostris Baranowski, 2005
- Ozophora englemani Slater, 1983
- Ozophora festiva Slater, 1983
- Ozophora floridana Slater & Baranowski, 1983
- Ozophora fuscipennis Baranowski, 2005
- Ozophora gilva Slater & Baranowski, 1983
- Ozophora graciliforma Baranowski, 2005
- Ozophora gracilipes (Stal, 1858)
- Ozophora helenae Baranowski & Slater, 1984
- Ozophora heydoni Barber & Ashlock, 1960
- Ozophora hirsuta Slater & Baranowski, 1979
- Ozophora hispaniola Slater, 1990
- Ozophora hohenbergia Slater & Baranowski, 1978
- Ozophora inca Slater, 1995
- Ozophora insulanus Slater, 2005
- Ozophora irrorata Slater, 1995
- Ozophora josephina Slater & Baranowski, 1979
- Ozophora laticephala Slater & O'Donnell, 1979
- Ozophora levis Slater & Baranowski, 1983
- Ozophora longirostris Slater & Baranowski, 1979
- Ozophora maculata Slater & O'Donnell, 1979
- Ozophora maculosa Slater, 1983
- Ozophora majas Baranowski & Slater, 1984
- Ozophora minuscula Scudder, 1958
- Ozophora nana Slater, 1986
- Ozophora neotropicalis Slater, 1995
- Ozophora nitida Slater, 1987
- Ozophora notabilis Slater, 1983
- Ozophora occidentalis Slater, 1988
- Ozophora octomaculata Ramos, 1946
- Ozophora ovalis (Dallas, 1852)
- Ozophora pallescens (Distant, 1893)
- Ozophora pallidifemur Scudder, 1958
  - Ozophora pallidifemur fuscifemur Scudder, 1958
  - Ozophora pallidifemur pallidifemur Scudder, 1958
- Ozophora paranana Slater, 1995
- Ozophora parapicta Slater & Hassey, 1981
- Ozophora parimpicta Baranowski, 2005
- Ozophora parva Slater, 1983
- Ozophora peruviana Slater & O'Donnell, 1979
- Ozophora picturata Uhler, 1871
- Ozophora psarocoris Baranowski, 2005
- Ozophora pseudimpicta Baranowski, 2005
- Ozophora pusilla Slater, 1990
- Ozophora quinquemaculata Barber, 1939
  - Ozophora quinquemaculata quinquemaculata Barber, 1939
  - Ozophora quinquemaculata subtilis Slater, 1987
- Ozophora rawlinsi Slater, 2005
- Ozophora reperta Blatchley, 1926
- Ozophora robusta Slater, 1983
- Ozophora rubra Slater, 1995
- Ozophora rubrolinea Slater, 1987
- Ozophora rubronotata Slater, 1995
- Ozophora sabensis Baranowski, 2005
- Ozophora salsaverdeae Slater, 1988
- Ozophora schaffneri Slater, 1995
- Ozophora scutellata Slater, 1983
- Ozophora similis Slater & O'Donnell, 1979
- Ozophora singularis Slater, 1983
- Ozophora slateri Baranowski, 1987
- Ozophora subimpicta Barber, 1939
- Ozophora sylvana Slater, 1995
- Ozophora testacea Slater, 1990
- Ozophora triangularis Slater, 2005
- Ozophora trinidadensis Baranowski, 2005
- Ozophora trinotata Barber, 1914
- Ozophora umbrosa Slater, 1987
- Ozophora unicolor Uhler, 1894
- Ozophora vandoesburgi Slater, 1995
- Ozophora variegata (Kirby, 1890)
- Ozophora vasquezae Slater, 1986
- Ozophora venusta Slater, 2005
- Ozophora versicolor Slater, 1983
- Ozophora villosa Slater, 1983
- Ozophora woodruffi Woodruff & Slater, 2012
- Ozophora xanthocnemis Baranowski, 2005
