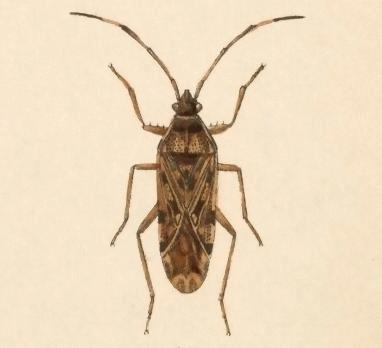
- Balboa variabilis

Scientific classification
- Domain: Eukaryota
- Kingdom: Animalia
- Phylum: Arthropoda
- Class: Insecta
- Order: Hemiptera
- Suborder: Heteroptera
- Family: Rhyparochromidae
- Subfamily: Rhyparochrominae
- Tribe: Ozophorini

= Ozophorini =

Tribe of true bugs

Ozophorini is a tribe of dirt-colored seed bugs in the family Rhyparochromidae. There are more than 30 genera and 220 described species in Ozophorini.

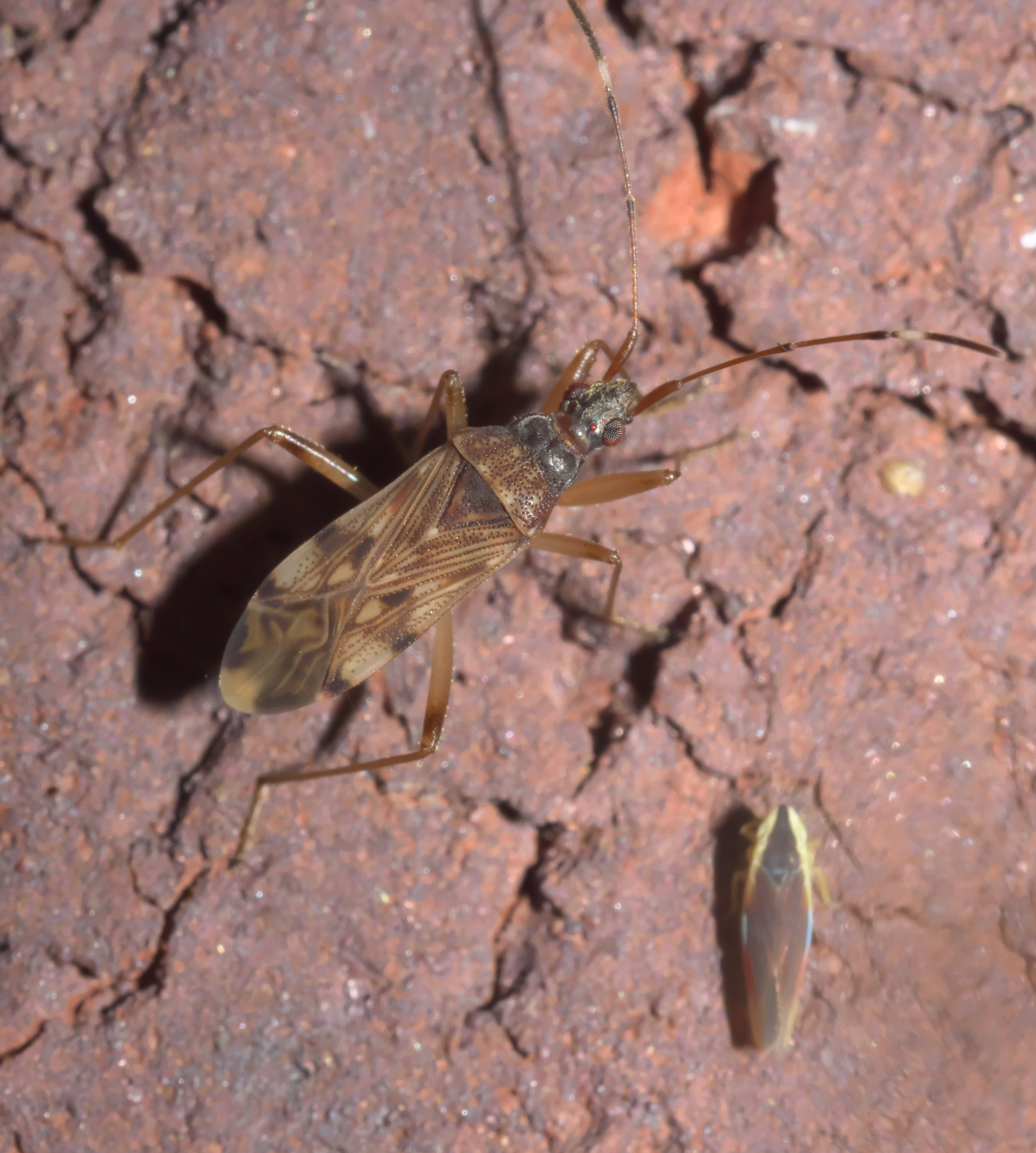
Ozophora picturata

== Genera ==
These 31 genera belong to the tribe Ozophorini:

- Allotrophora Slater & Brailovsky, 1983
- Balboa Distant, 1893
- Bedunia Stal, 1874
- Bergidea Breddin, 1897
- Brailovskyocoris Slater, 1994
- Bryanellocoris Slater, 1957
- Cervicoris Slater, 1982
- Cryptotrophora Brailovsky & Barrera, 2016
- Ethaltomarus Scudder, 1963
- Gressittocoris Slater & Zheng, 1985
- Icaracoris Slater, 1985
- Longinischus Brailovsky, 2009
- Longinomerus Brailovsky & Barrera, 2010
- Lygofuscanellus Scudder, 1962
- Marmottania Puton & Lethierry, 1887
- Micrymenus Bergroth, 1921
- Migdilybs Hesse, 1925
- Neolonginischus Brailovsky & Barrera, 2016
- Noualhieria Puton, 1889
- Omacrus Bergroth, 1916
- Ozophora Uhler, 1871
- Pamozophora Ashlock & Slater, 1982
- Paraporta Zheng, 1981
- Porta Distant, 1903
- Primierus Distant, 1901
- Prosomoeus Scott, 1874
- Pseudomenotelus Brailovsky & Cervantes, 2009
- Pseudomenus Ashlock & Slater, 1982
- Rugomenus Ashlock, 1985
- Tachytatus Bergroth, 1918
- Vertomannus Distant, 1903
