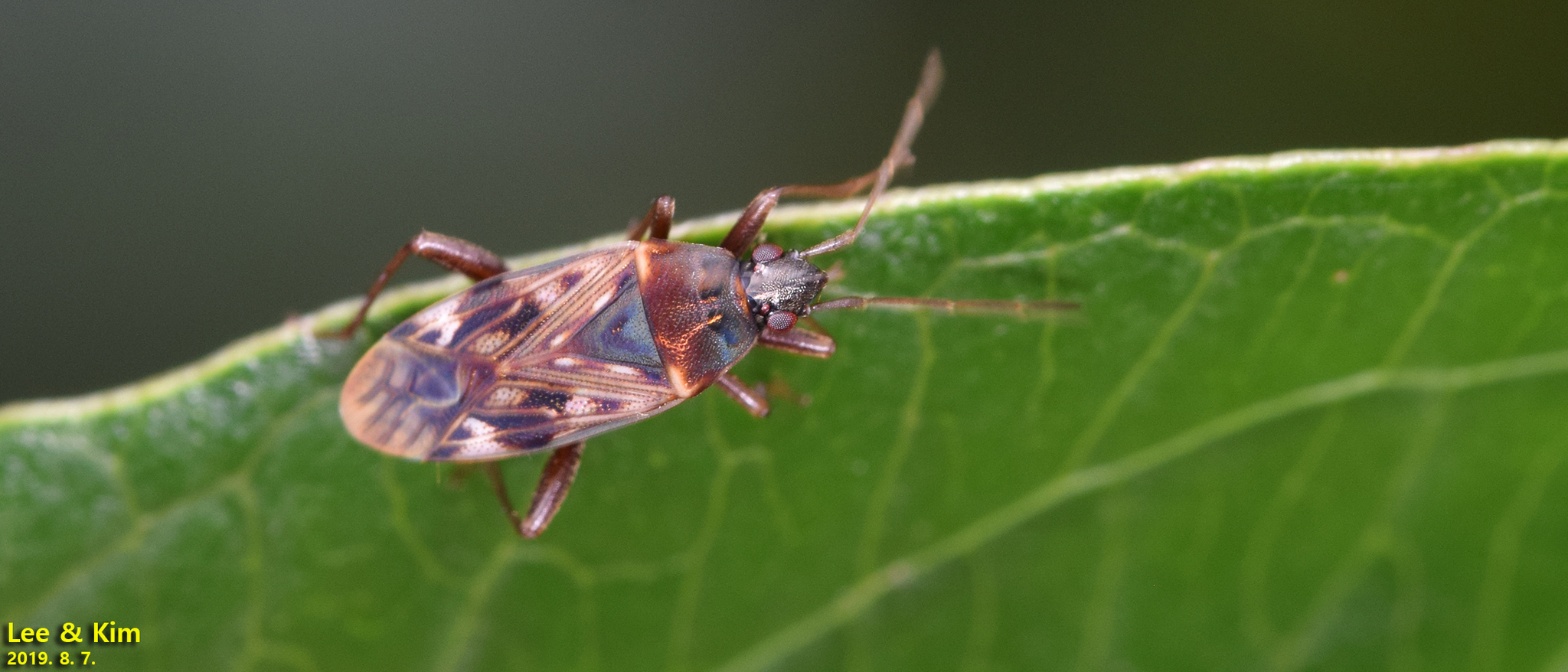
- Neolethaeus dallasi, South Korea

Scientific classification
- Kingdom: Animalia
- Phylum: Arthropoda
- Class: Insecta
- Order: Hemiptera
- Suborder: Heteroptera
- Family: Rhyparochromidae
- Subfamily: Rhyparochrominae
- Tribe: Lethaeini
- Genus: Neolethaeus
- Species: N. dallasi

Binomial name
- Neolethaeus dallasi (Scott, 1874)

= Neolethaeus dallasi =

Species of dirt-colored seed bug

Neolethaeus dallasi is a species of dirt-colored seed bug in the family Rhyparochromidae found in eastern Asia, especially Korea.
