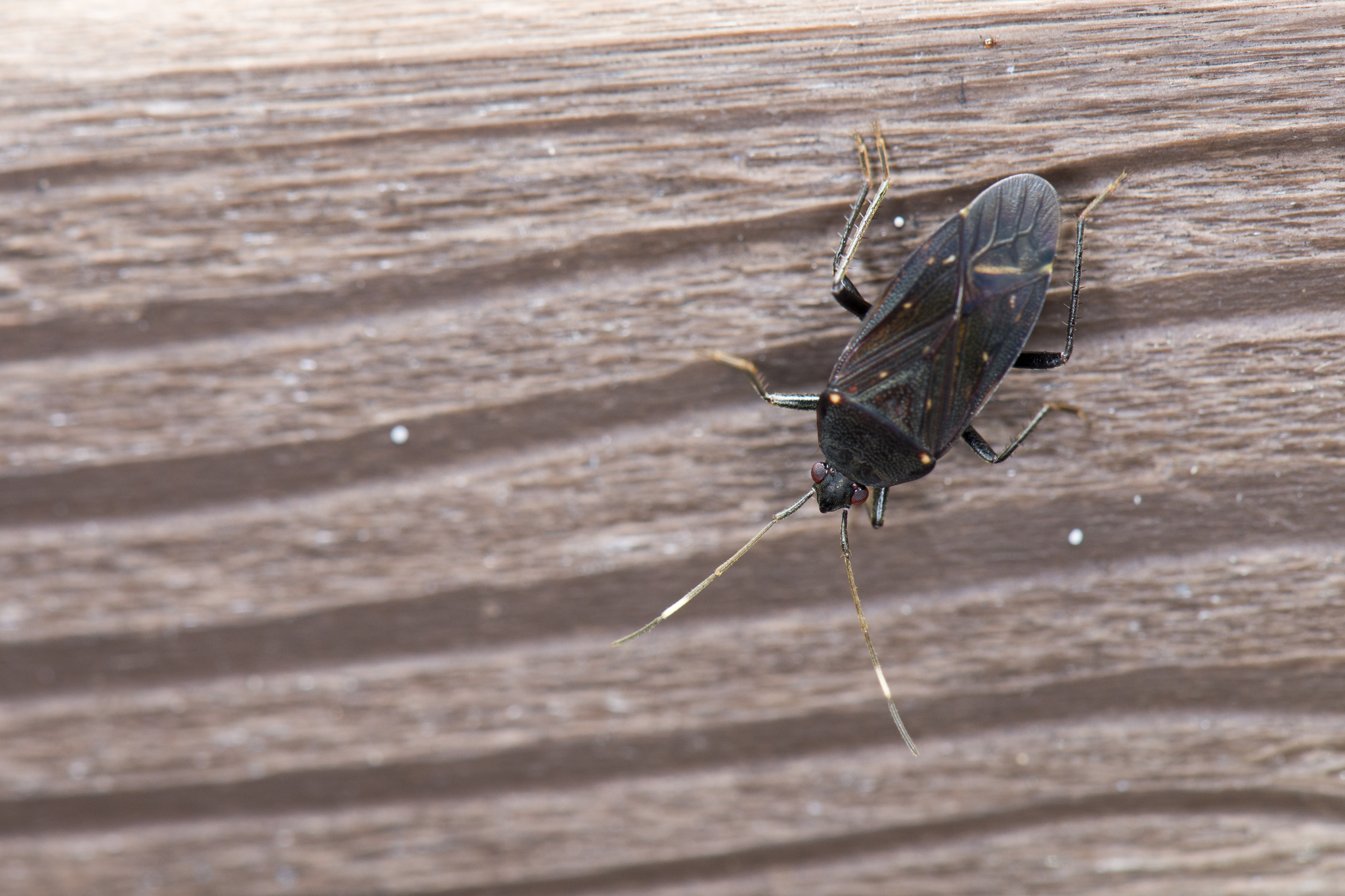
- Neolethaeus assamensis, Taiwan

Scientific classification
- Kingdom: Animalia
- Phylum: Arthropoda
- Clade: Pancrustacea
- Class: Insecta
- Order: Hemiptera
- Suborder: Heteroptera
- Family: Rhyparochromidae
- Subfamily: Rhyparochrominae
- Tribe: Lethaeini
- Genus: Neolethaeus
- Species: N. assamensis

Binomial name
- Neolethaeus assamensis (Distant, 1901)

= Neolethaeus assamensis =

Species of dirt-colored seed bug

Neolethaeus assamensis is a species of dirt-colored seed bug in the family Rhyparochromidae, found in south and eastern Asia.
