= Cryphula nitens =

Scientific classification
- Domain: Eukaryota
- Kingdom: Animalia
- Phylum: Arthropoda
- Class: Insecta
- Order: Hemiptera
- Suborder: Heteroptera
- Family: Rhyparochromidae
- Tribe: Lethaeini
- Genus: Cryphula
- Species: C. nitens

Binomial name
- Cryphula nitens Barber, 1955

Species of true bug

Cryphula nitens is a species of dirt-colored seed bug in the family Rhyparochromidae. It is found in North America.
