= Xestocoris nitens =

Scientific classification
- Domain: Eukaryota
- Kingdom: Animalia
- Phylum: Arthropoda
- Class: Insecta
- Order: Hemiptera
- Suborder: Heteroptera
- Family: Rhyparochromidae
- Tribe: Lethaeini
- Genus: Xestocoris
- Species: X. nitens

Binomial name
- Xestocoris nitens Van Duzee, 1906

Species of true bug

Xestocoris nitens is a species of dirt-colored seed bug in the family Rhyparochromidae.
