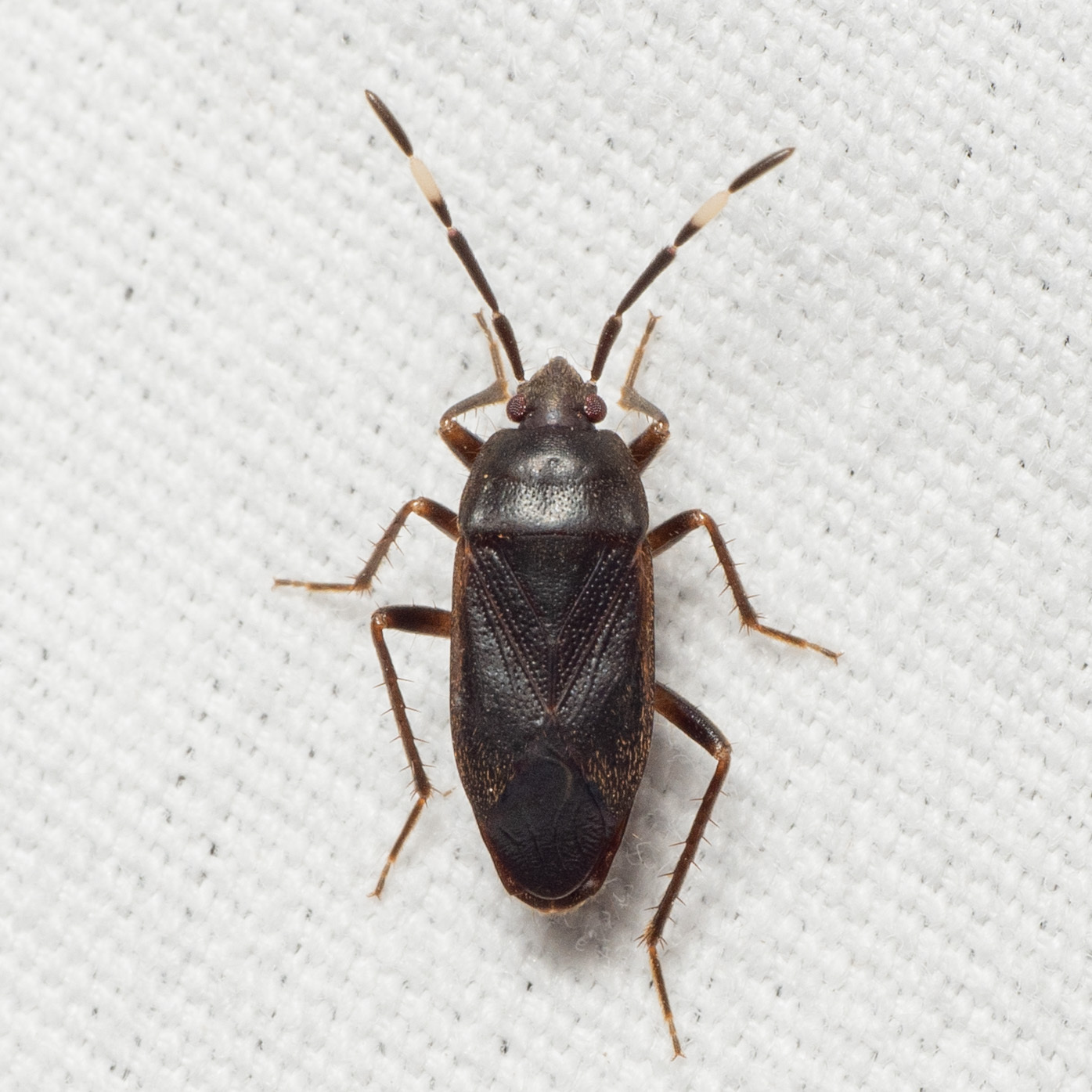

Scientific classification
- Kingdom: Animalia
- Phylum: Arthropoda
- Clade: Pancrustacea
- Class: Insecta
- Order: Hemiptera
- Suborder: Heteroptera
- Family: Rhyparochromidae
- Tribe: Lethaeini
- Genus: Cistalia
- Species: C. explanata

Binomial name
- Cistalia explanata Barber, 1938

= Cistalia explanata =

Species of true bug

Cistalia explanata is a species of dirt-colored seed bug in the family Rhyparochromidae. It is found in North America.
