= Valtissius =

Scientific classification
- Kingdom: Animalia
- Phylum: Arthropoda
- Class: Insecta
- Order: Hemiptera
- Suborder: Heteroptera
- Family: Rhyparochromidae
- Subfamily: Rhyparochrominae
- Tribe: Lethaeini
- Genus: Valtissius; Barber, 1918

Genus of true bugs

Valtissius is a genus of seed bugs in the family Rhyparochromidae and found in the Americas. There are at least three described species in Valtissius.

== Species ==
These three species belong to the genus Valtissius:

- Valtissius distinctus (Distant, 1901)
- Valtissius diversus (Distant, 1893)
- Valtissius pusillus (Barber, 1948)
