= Cryphula trimaculata =

Scientific classification
- Domain: Eukaryota
- Kingdom: Animalia
- Phylum: Arthropoda
- Class: Insecta
- Order: Hemiptera
- Suborder: Heteroptera
- Family: Rhyparochromidae
- Genus: Cryphula
- Species: C. trimaculata

Binomial name
- Cryphula trimaculata (Distant, 1882)

Species of true bug

Cryphula trimaculata is a species of dirt-colored seed bug in the family Rhyparochromidae. It is found in Central America and North America.
