= Xestocoris =

Scientific classification
- Domain: Eukaryota
- Kingdom: Animalia
- Phylum: Arthropoda
- Class: Insecta
- Order: Hemiptera
- Suborder: Heteroptera
- Family: Rhyparochromidae
- Subfamily: Rhyparochrominae
- Tribe: Lethaeini
- Genus: Xestocoris; Van Duzee, 1906

Genus of true bugs

Xestocoris is a genus of dirt-colored seed bugs in the family Rhyparochromidae. There are about six described species in Xestocoris.

== Species ==
These six species belong to the genus Xestocoris:

- Xestocoris adustus Cervantes & Brailovsky, 2008
- Xestocoris clavatus Cervantes & Brailovsky, 2008
- Xestocoris collinus (Distant, 1893)
- Xestocoris nitens Van Duzee, 1906
- Xestocoris punctatus Cervantes & Brailovsky, 2008
- Xestocoris tibialis O'Donnell, 2007
