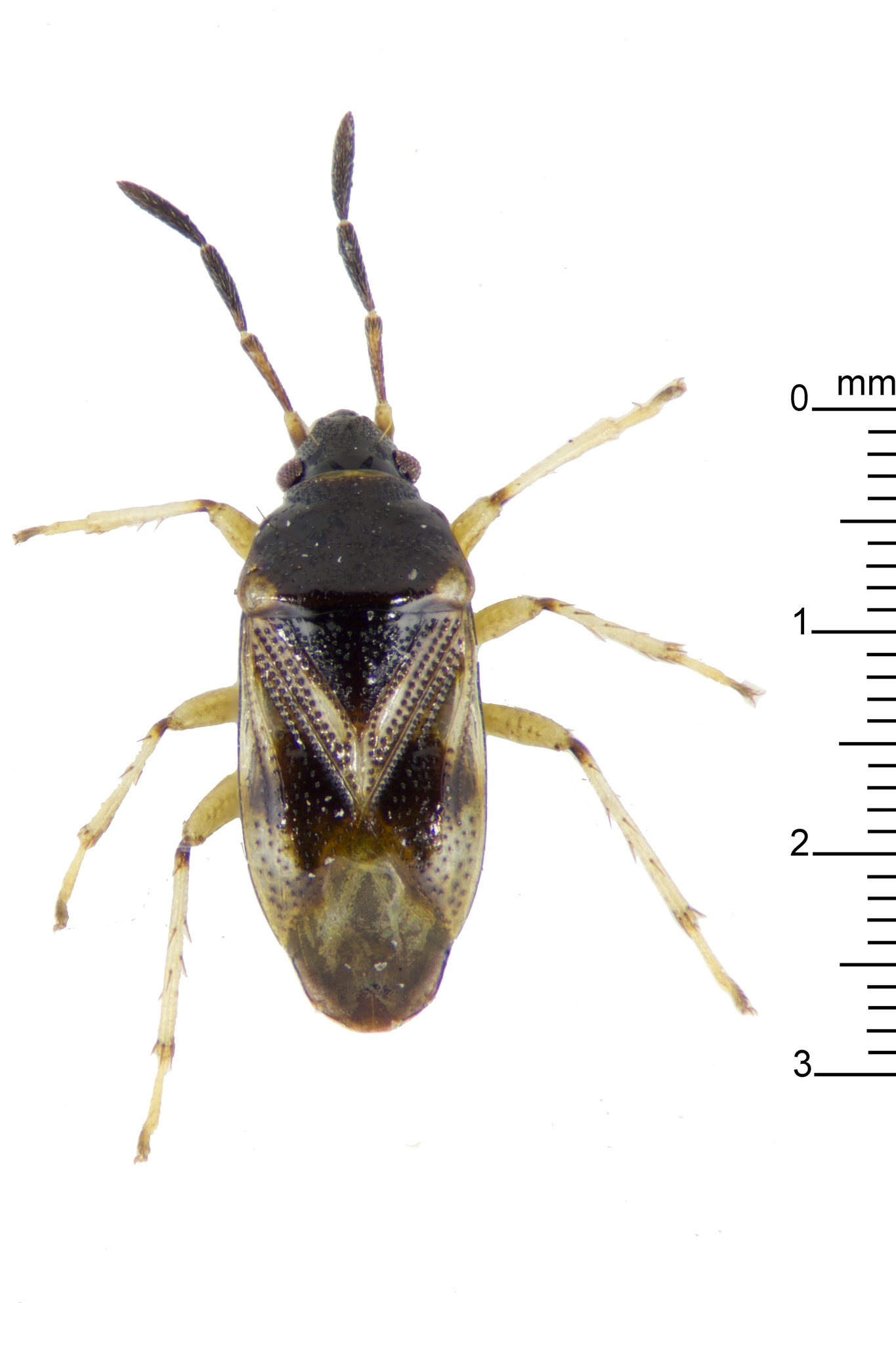
- Diniella glabrata

Scientific classification
- Missing taxonomy template (fix): Diniella

Synonyms
- Abdolominus Distant, 1904; Androgeus Stål, 1865; Dinia Stål, 1874; Lasiosomoidea Wagner, 1961; Lasiosomus; Lispochroa Breddin, 1907; Lispolophus Bergroth, 1894; Lua Distant, 1909

= Diniella =

Genus of true bugs

Diniella is a genus of Asian seed bugs in the family Rhyparochromidae and tribe Lethaeini, erected by Ernst Evald Bergroth in 1893. The known species distribution appears to include North-western Africa, Sri Lanka, Indochina and Japan.

== Species ==
The Lygaeoidea Species File lists:

1. Diniella bengalensis Distant, 1909
2. Diniella blandula (Breddin, 1907)
3. Diniella cognita Scudder, 1971
4. Diniella coleoptrata Slater, 1998
5. Diniella fasciata (Heer, 1853)
6. Diniella glabrata (Stål, 1874) – type species (by subsequent designation)
7. Diniella intaminata (Distant, 1904)
8. Diniella laevicollis (Reuter, 1882)
9. Diniella laeviuscula (Bergroth, 1918)
10. Diniella marginatus (Signoret, 1860)
11. Diniella nitens (Wagner, 1961)
12. Diniella nitida (Reuter, 1882)
13. Diniella pallipes (Scott, 1874)
14. Diniella picina (Distant, 1904)
15. Diniella polita (Stål, 1874)
16. Diniella seriepunctata (Lethierry, 1889)
17. Diniella sevosa (Distant, 1901)
18. Diniella tartarea (Distant, 1909)
19. Diniella trispinosa Linnavuori, 1978
20. Diniella yinae Zheng & Liu, 1992
