= Cryphula =

Scientific classification
- Kingdom: Animalia
- Phylum: Arthropoda
- Class: Insecta
- Order: Hemiptera
- Suborder: Heteroptera
- Family: Rhyparochromidae
- Subfamily: Rhyparochrominae
- Tribe: Lethaeini
- Genus: Cryphula; Stal, 1874

Synonyms
- Trapezus Distant, 1882

Genus of true bugs

Cryphula is a genus of seed bugs in the family Rhyparochromidae and found in the Americas. There are about 14 described species in Cryphula.

== Species ==
These 14 species belong to the genus Cryphula:

- Cryphula abortiva Barber, 1918
- Cryphula affinis (Distant, 1901)
- Cryphula apicata (Distant, 1893)
- Cryphula australis (Berg, 1884)
- Cryphula bennetti Baranowski & Slater, 1979
- Cryphula brunnea Dellapé, Melo & O’Donnell, 2015
- Cryphula dubia (Berg, 1883)
- Cryphula fasciata (Distant, 1893)
- Cryphula humeralis Dellapé, Melo & O’Donnell, 2015
- Cryphula nitens Barber, 1955
- Cryphula parallelogramma Stal, 1874
- Cryphula rivierei Dellapé, Melo & O’Donnell, 2015
- Cryphula subunicolor Barber, 1955
- Cryphula trimaculata (Distant, 1893)
