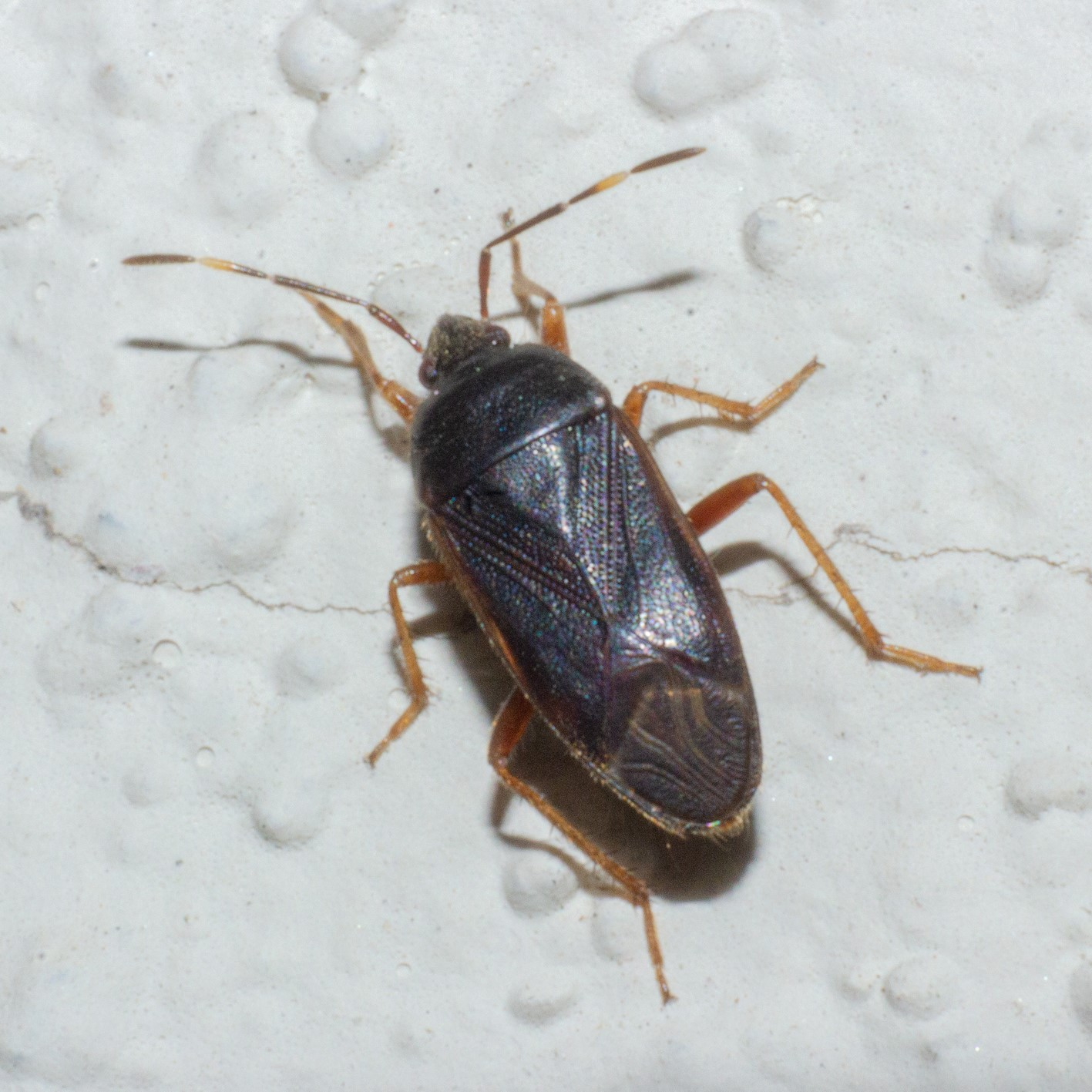
- Cistalia signoretii

Scientific classification
- Kingdom: Animalia
- Phylum: Arthropoda
- Clade: Pancrustacea
- Class: Insecta
- Order: Hemiptera
- Suborder: Heteroptera
- Family: Rhyparochromidae
- Subfamily: Rhyparochrominae
- Tribe: Lethaeini
- Genus: Cistalia; Stal, 1874

= Cistalia =

Genus of true bugs

Cistalia is a genus of seed bugs in the family Rhyparochromidae and found in the Americas. There are about eight described species in Cistalia.

== Species ==
These eight species belong to the genus Cistalia:

- Cistalia alboannulata (Stal, 1858)
- Cistalia binotata Slater & Baranowski, 1973
- Cistalia explanata Barber, 1938
- Cistalia micans Slater & O'Donnell, 1978
- Cistalia neotropicalis Slater & Baranowski, 1973
- Cistalia pallidifemur Cervantes & Gámez-Virués, 2006
- Cistalia parva Dellapé, Melo & O’Donnell, 2015
- Cistalia signoretii (Guerin-Meneville, 1857)
