= Lamproceps =

Scientific classification
- Missing taxonomy template (fix): Lamproceps

Synonyms
- Ptychoderrhis Bergroth, 1918

Genus of true bugs

External image
- Images at iNaturalist

Lamproceps is a genus of Asian seed bugs in the family Rhyparochromidae and tribe Lethaeini, erected by Odo Reuter in 1882. The known species distribution appears to include India, Indochina (Vietnam) and Japan.

== Species ==
The Lygaeoidea Species File lists:

1. Lamproceps antennalis (Distant, 1918)
2. Lamproceps antennatus (Scott, 1874)
3. Lamproceps australis Woodward, 1980
4. Lamproceps bipunctatus (Bergroth, 1918)
5. Lamproceps indicus (Dallas, 1852) – type species (as Lamproceps apicalis Reuter, 1882)
6. Lamproceps simulans (Distant, 1906)
7. Lamproceps trabeatus (Distant, 1901)
