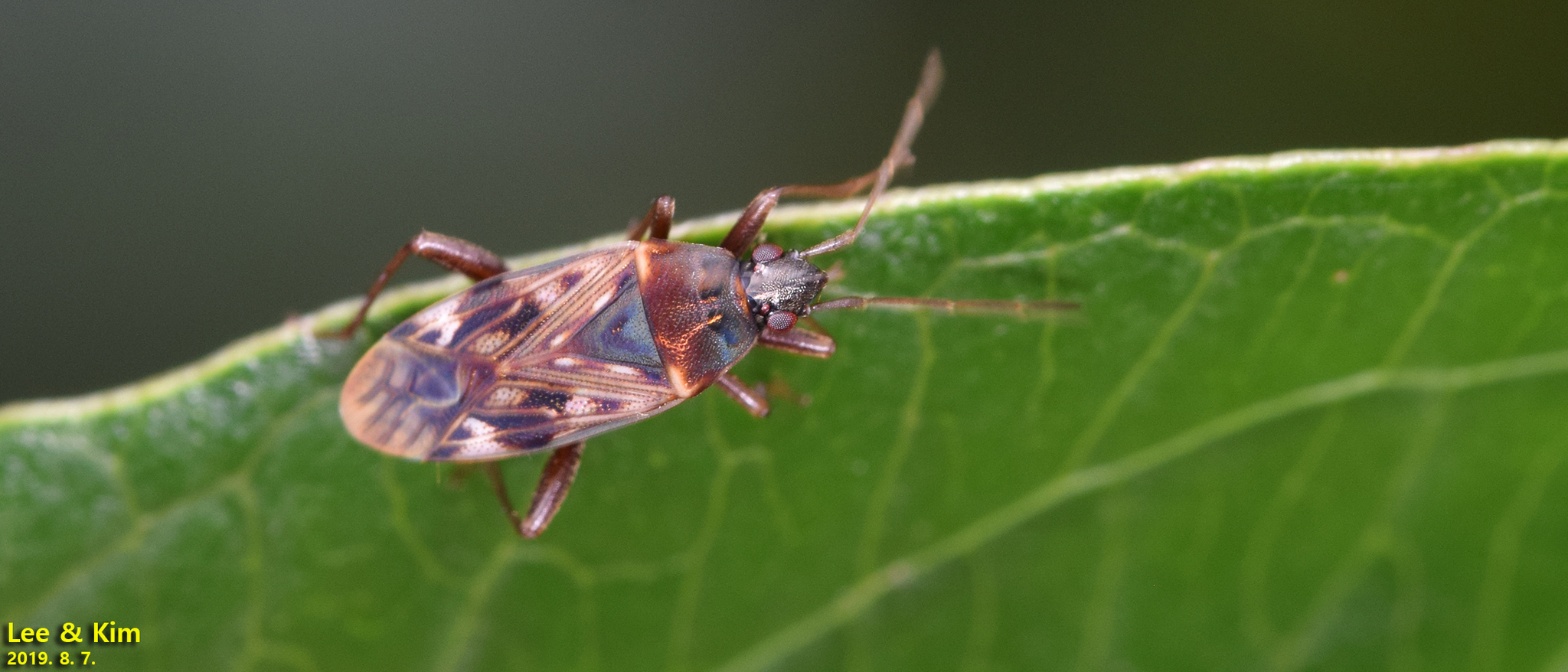
- Neolethaeus dallasi, South Korea

Scientific classification
- Domain: Eukaryota
- Kingdom: Animalia
- Phylum: Arthropoda
- Class: Insecta
- Order: Hemiptera
- Suborder: Heteroptera
- Family: Rhyparochromidae
- Subfamily: Rhyparochrominae
- Tribe: Lethaeini
- Genus: Neolethaeus; Distant, 1909

= Neolethaeus =

Genus of insects

Neolethaeus is a genus of dirt-colored seed bugs in the family Rhyparochromidae. There are more than 20 described species in Neolethaeus, found mainly in Asia, Australia, and Africa.

== Species ==
These 27 species belong to the genus Neolethaeus:

- Neolethaeus aethiopicus Hesse, 1925
- Neolethaeus alienus (Walker, 1872)
- Neolethaeus assamensis (Distant, 1901)
- Neolethaeus australiensis Woodward, 1963
- Neolethaeus cantrelli Woodward, 1968
- Neolethaeus carinulatus (Breddin, 1907)
- Neolethaeus cheesmanae Woodward, 1968
- Neolethaeus dallasi (Scott, 1874)
- Neolethaeus densus Li & Bu, 2006
- Neolethaeus descriptus (Walker, 1872)
- Neolethaeus distinctus Li & Bu, 2006
- Neolethaeus esakii (Hidaka, 1962)
- Neolethaeus extremus (Walker, 1872)
- Neolethaeus formosanus (Hidaka, 1962)
- Neolethaeus giganteus Scudder, 1963
- Neolethaeus greeni (Kirby, 1891)
- Neolethaeus indicus Mukhopadhyay, 1988
- Neolethaeus lewisi (Distant, 1883)
- Neolethaeus maculacellus Li & Bu, 2006
- Neolethaeus maculosus Slater & O'Donnell, 1999
- Neolethaeus madagascariensis Slater & O'Donnell, 1999
- Neolethaeus polhemi Slater & O'Donnell, 1999
- Neolethaeus signatus (Distant, 1901)
- Neolethaeus tenebrosus (Distant, 1914)
- Neolethaeus tokarensis (Hidaka, 1962)
- Neolethaeus typicus Distant, 1909
- Neolethaeus ulugurus Scudder, 1962
