= Valtissius diversus =

Scientific classification
- Kingdom: Animalia
- Phylum: Arthropoda
- Clade: Pancrustacea
- Class: Insecta
- Order: Hemiptera
- Suborder: Heteroptera
- Family: Rhyparochromidae
- Genus: Valtissius
- Species: V. diversus

Binomial name
- Valtissius diversus (Distant, 1893)

Synonyms
- Petissius diversus Distant, 1893

Species of true bug

Valtissius diversus is a species of dirt-colored seed bug in the family Rhyparochromidae. It is found in Central America and North America.
