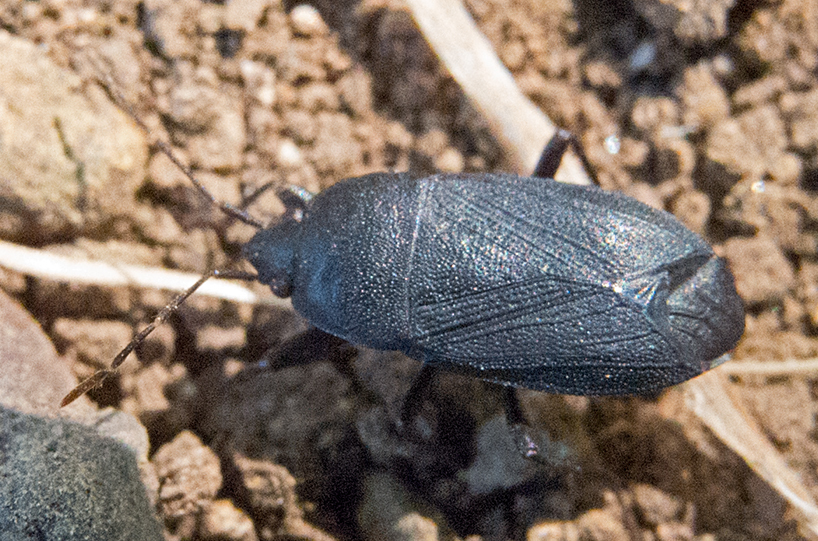
- Lethaeus cribratissimus

Scientific classification
- Kingdom: Animalia
- Phylum: Arthropoda
- Clade: Pancrustacea
- Class: Insecta
- Order: Hemiptera
- Suborder: Heteroptera
- Family: Rhyparochromidae
- Subfamily: Rhyparochrominae
- Tribe: Lethaeini; Stål, 1872

Synonyms
- Camptocerini Wagner, 1961; Lethaeiini Stål, 1872; Lethaeni Stål, 1872; Lethiini Stål, 1872; Lipostemmatidae Berg, 1879; Lipostemmatinae Berg, 1879; Lipostematina Berg, 1879

= Lethaeini =

Tribe of true bugs

Lethaeini is a tribe of seed bugs in the family Rhyparochromidae. There are more than 180 described species in Lethaeini.

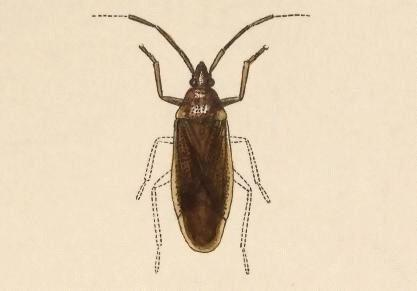
Bubaces castaneus

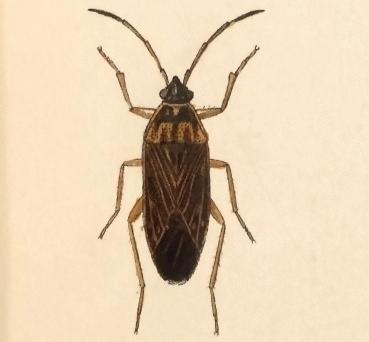
Petissius assimilandus

== Genera ==
The following genera (41 in 2025) belong to the tribe Lethaeini:

- Adauctus Distant, 1909
- Afromydrus Scudder, 1968
- Aristaenetoides Kondorosy, 2006
- Aristaenetus Distant, 1901
- Atkinsonianus Distant, 1909
- Austroxestus Woodward, 1962
- Bubaces Distant, 1893
- Camptocera Jakovlev, 1877
- Carabocoris Gross, 1958
- Cistalia Stal, 1874
- Coleocoris Gross, 1958
- Cryphula Stal, 1874
- Diniella Bergroth, 1893
- Esuris Stal, 1874
- Exomyocara Slater & Woodward, 1974
- Gonatoides Slater, 1957
- Hexatrichocoris Kiritshenko, 1931
- Lamproceps Reuter, 1882
- Lampropunctus Scudder, 1971
- Lethaeograndellus Scudder, 1962
- Lethaeus Dallas, 1852
- Lipostemmata Berg, 1879
- Lophoraglius Wagner, 1961
- Margolethaeus Zsalakovics & Kondorosy, 2014
- Myocara Bergroth, 1916
- Neolethaeus Distant, 1909
- Neopetissius O’Donnell, 2001
- Noteolethaeus Woodward & Slater, 1962
- Orbellis Distant, 1913
- Paragonatas Barber, 1939
- Paramyocara Woodward & Malipatil, 1977
- Petissius Distant, 1893
- Porrectolethaeus Scudder, 1971
- Ptilocamptocera Wagner, 1961
- Rhaptus Stal, 1874
- Stictolethaeus O'Donnell, 1991
- Sweetolethaeus Slater, 1972
- Tuitocoris Cervantes, 2012
- Valtissius Barber, 1918
- Xestocoris Van Duzee, 1906
- † Miogonates Sailer & Carvalho, 1957
