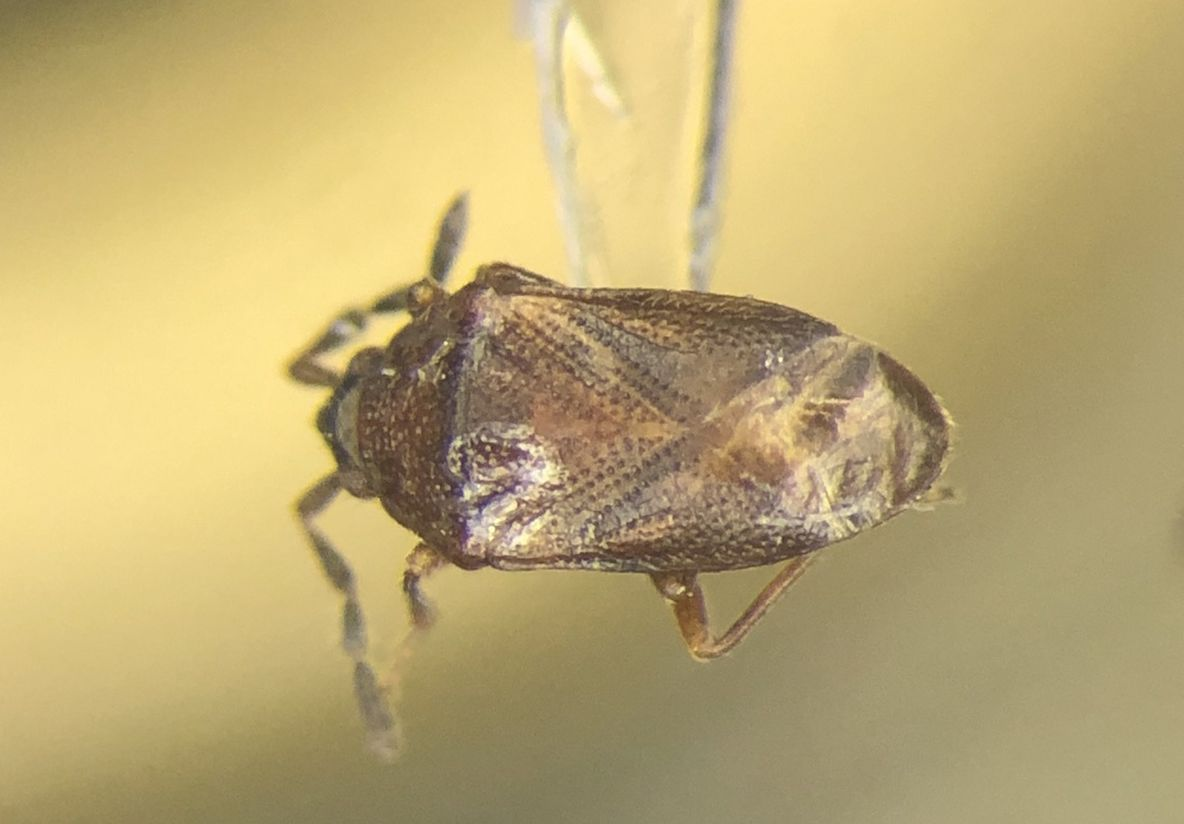

Scientific classification
- Domain: Eukaryota
- Kingdom: Animalia
- Phylum: Arthropoda
- Class: Insecta
- Order: Hemiptera
- Suborder: Heteroptera
- Family: Rhyparochromidae
- Tribe: Antillocorini
- Genus: Antillocoris
- Species: A. minutus

Binomial name
- Antillocoris minutus (Bergroth, 1895)

= Antillocoris minutus =

Species of true bug

Antillocoris minutus is a species of dirt-colored seed bug in the family Rhyparochromidae. It is found in North America.
