= Botocudo modestus =

Scientific classification
- Domain: Eukaryota
- Kingdom: Animalia
- Phylum: Arthropoda
- Class: Insecta
- Order: Hemiptera
- Suborder: Heteroptera
- Family: Rhyparochromidae
- Tribe: Antillocorini
- Genus: Botocudo
- Species: B. modestus

Binomial name
- Botocudo modestus (Barber, 1948)

Species of true bug

Botocudo modestus is a species of dirt-colored seed bug in the family Rhyparochromidae. It is found in North America.
