= Antillocoris pilosulus =

Scientific classification
- Kingdom: Animalia
- Phylum: Arthropoda
- Clade: Pancrustacea
- Class: Insecta
- Order: Hemiptera
- Suborder: Heteroptera
- Family: Rhyparochromidae
- Tribe: Antillocorini
- Genus: Antillocoris
- Species: A. pilosulus

Binomial name
- Antillocoris pilosulus (Stal, 1874)

Species of true bug

Antillocoris pilosulus is a species of dirt-colored seed bug in the family Rhyparochromidae. It is found in North America.
