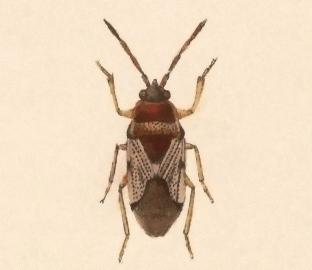

Scientific classification
- Kingdom: Animalia
- Phylum: Arthropoda
- Clade: Pancrustacea
- Class: Insecta
- Order: Hemiptera
- Suborder: Heteroptera
- Family: Rhyparochromidae
- Genus: Cligenes
- Species: C. distinctus

Binomial name
- Cligenes distinctus Distant, 1893

= Cligenes distinctus =

Species of true bug

Cligenes distinctus is a species of dirt-colored seed bug in the family Rhyparochromidae. It is found in the Caribbean Sea, Central America, and North America.
