= Botocudo (bug) =

Scientific classification
- Kingdom: Animalia
- Phylum: Arthropoda
- Class: Insecta
- Order: Hemiptera
- Suborder: Heteroptera
- Family: Rhyparochromidae
- Tribe: Antillocorini
- Genus: Botocudo; Kirkaldy, 1904

Genus of true bugs

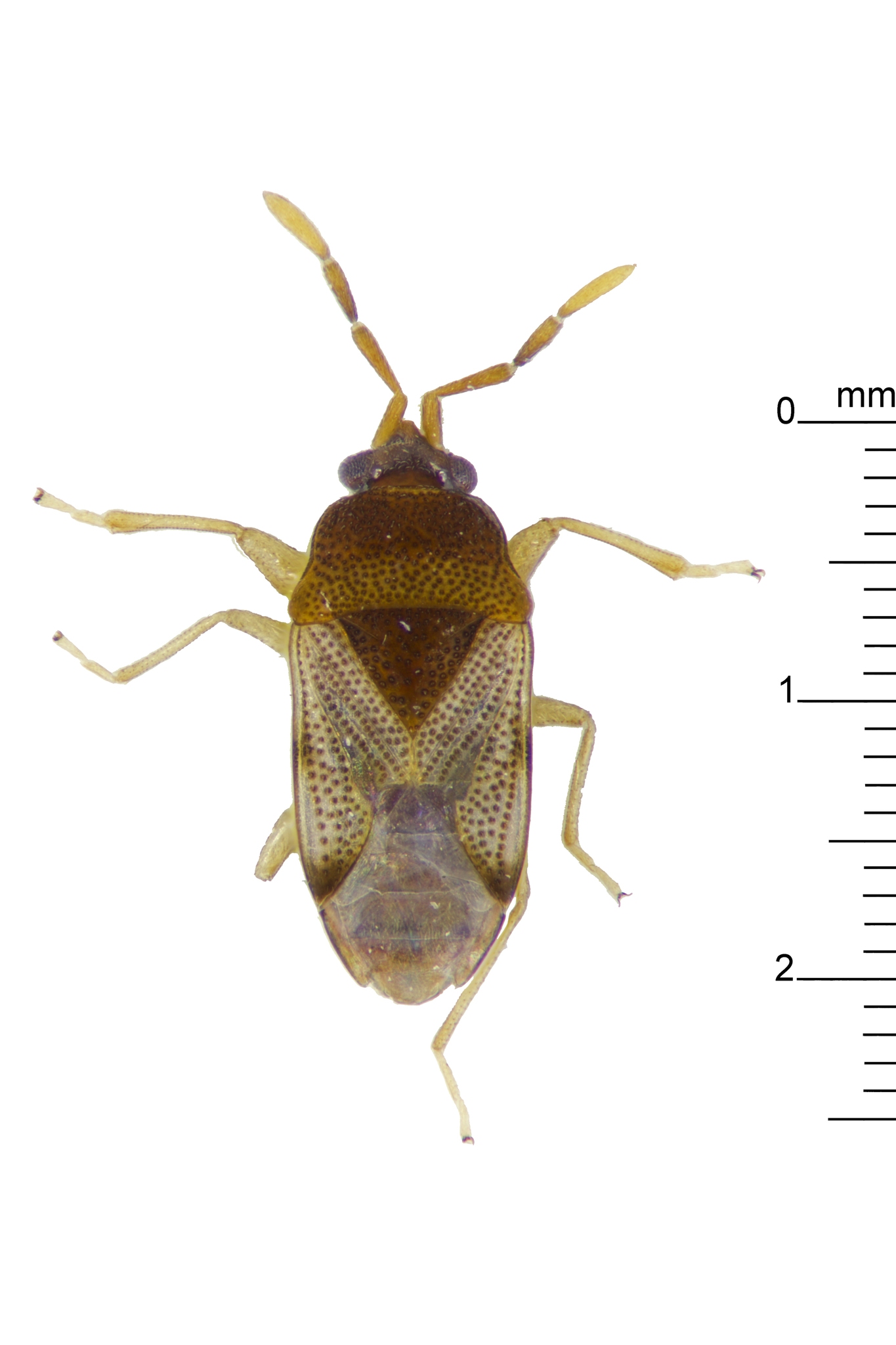
A botocudo flavicornis

Botocudo is a genus of dirt-colored seed bugs in the family Rhyparochromidae. There are at least 30 described species in Botocudo.

== Species ==
These 36 species belong to the genus Botocudo:

- Botocudo aethiops (Distant, W.L., 1904)^{c g}
- Botocudo ashanti Southwood, 1963^{c g}
- Botocudo assimulans (Bergroth, E., 1918)^{c g}
- Botocudo cavernicola Slater, J.A., 1984^{c g}
- Botocudo delineatus (Distant, 1893)^{i c g}
- Botocudo diluticornis (Stål, 1858)^{i c g}
- Botocudo ferrugineus Linnavuori, R., 1978^{c g}
- Botocudo flavicornis (Signoret, V., 1880)^{c g}
- Botocudo formosanus (Hidaka, T., 1959)^{c g}
- Botocudo fraternus (Distant, W.L., 1918)^{c g}
- Botocudo gardineri (Distant, W.L., 1913)^{c g}
- Botocudo giloensis Linnavuori, R., 1978^{c g}
- Botocudo hebrodes Slater, J.A. & Polhemus, 1987^{c g}
- Botocudo hirsutus Zheng, L.Y. & H.G. Zou, 1981^{c g}
- Botocudo japonicus (Hidaka, T., 1959)^{c g}
- Botocudo longicornis (Barber, H.G., 1958)^{c g}
- Botocudo marginatus Zheng, L.Y. & H.G. Zou, 1981^{c g}
- Botocudo marianensis (Usinger, 1946)^{i c g}
- Botocudo modestus (Barber, 1948)^{i c g b}
- Botocudo neomodesta Slater, J.A. & H. Brailovsky, 1994^{c g}
- Botocudo noualhieri (Bergroth, E., 1895)^{c g}
- Botocudo ornatulus (Bergroth, E., 1895)^{c g}
- Botocudo patricius Distant, W.L., 1904^{c g}
- Botocudo picticollis (Bergroth, E., 1895)^{c g}
- Botocudo picturatus (Distant, W.L., 1893)^{c g}
- Botocudo polhemusi Slater, J.A. & Polhemus, 1987^{c g}
- Botocudo pronotalis Slater, J.A., 1979^{c g}
- Botocudo pusio (Stal, C., 1858)^{c g}
- Botocudo rennellensis (Scudder, G.G.E., 1958)^{c g}
- Botocudo scudderi Slater, J.A., 1979^{c g}
- Botocudo signanda (Distant, W.L., 1903)^{c g}
- Botocudo swezeyi (China, W.E., 1930)^{c g}
- Botocudo validulus (Bergroth, E., 1918)^{c g}
- Botocudo vitticollis Linnavuori, R., 1978^{c g}
- Botocudo x-niger Linnavuori, R., 1978^{c g}
- Botocudo yasumatsui (Hidaka, T., 1959)^{c g}

Data sources: i = ITIS, c = Catalogue of Life, g = GBIF, b = Bugguide.net
