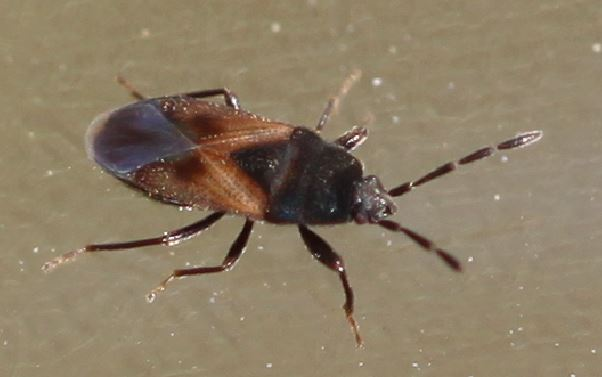
- Tropistethus holosericus

Scientific classification
- Kingdom: Animalia
- Phylum: Arthropoda
- Clade: Pancrustacea
- Class: Insecta
- Order: Hemiptera
- Suborder: Heteroptera
- Family: Rhyparochromidae
- Tribe: Antillocorini
- Genus: Tropistethus; Fieber, 1860

= Tropistethus =

Genus of true bugs

Tropistethus is a genus of true bugs belonging to the family Lygaeidae.

The genus was first described by Franz Xaver Fieber in 1861.

The species of this genus are found in Eurasia.

Species:

- Tropistethus fasciatus Ferrari, 1874
- Tropistethus holosericus
