= Paurocoris punctatus =

Scientific classification
- Domain: Eukaryota
- Kingdom: Animalia
- Phylum: Arthropoda
- Class: Insecta
- Order: Hemiptera
- Suborder: Heteroptera
- Family: Rhyparochromidae
- Genus: Paurocoris
- Species: P. punctatus

Binomial name
- Paurocoris punctatus (Distant, 1893)

Species of true bug

Paurocoris punctatus is a species of dirt-colored seed bug in the family Rhyparochromidae. It is found in Central America and North America.
