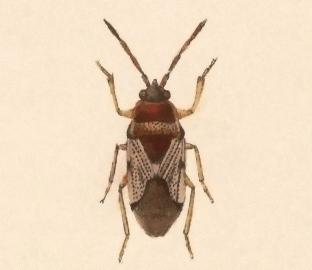
- Cligenes distinctus

Scientific classification
- Domain: Eukaryota
- Kingdom: Animalia
- Phylum: Arthropoda
- Class: Insecta
- Order: Hemiptera
- Suborder: Heteroptera
- Family: Rhyparochromidae
- Subfamily: Rhyparochrominae
- Tribe: Antillocorini
- Genus: Cligenes; Distant, 1893

Synonyms
- Tomopelta Uhler, 1893

= Cligenes =

Genus of true bugs

Cligenes is a genus of dirt-colored seed bugs in the family Rhyparochromidae. There are at least two described species in Cligenes.

== Species ==
These two species belong to the genus Cligenes:

- Cligenes distinctus Distant, 1893
- Cligenes grandis Brambila, 2000
