= Paurocoris =

Scientific classification
- Domain: Eukaryota
- Kingdom: Animalia
- Phylum: Arthropoda
- Class: Insecta
- Order: Hemiptera
- Suborder: Heteroptera
- Family: Rhyparochromidae
- Subfamily: Rhyparochrominae
- Tribe: Antillocorini
- Genus: Paurocoris; Slater, 1980

Genus of true bugs

Paurocoris is a genus of dirt-colored seed bugs in the family Rhyparochromidae. There are at least two described species in Paurocoris.

== Species ==
These two species belong to the genus Paurocoris:

- Paurocoris punctatus (Distant, 1893)
- Paurocoris wygodzinskyi Slater, 1980
