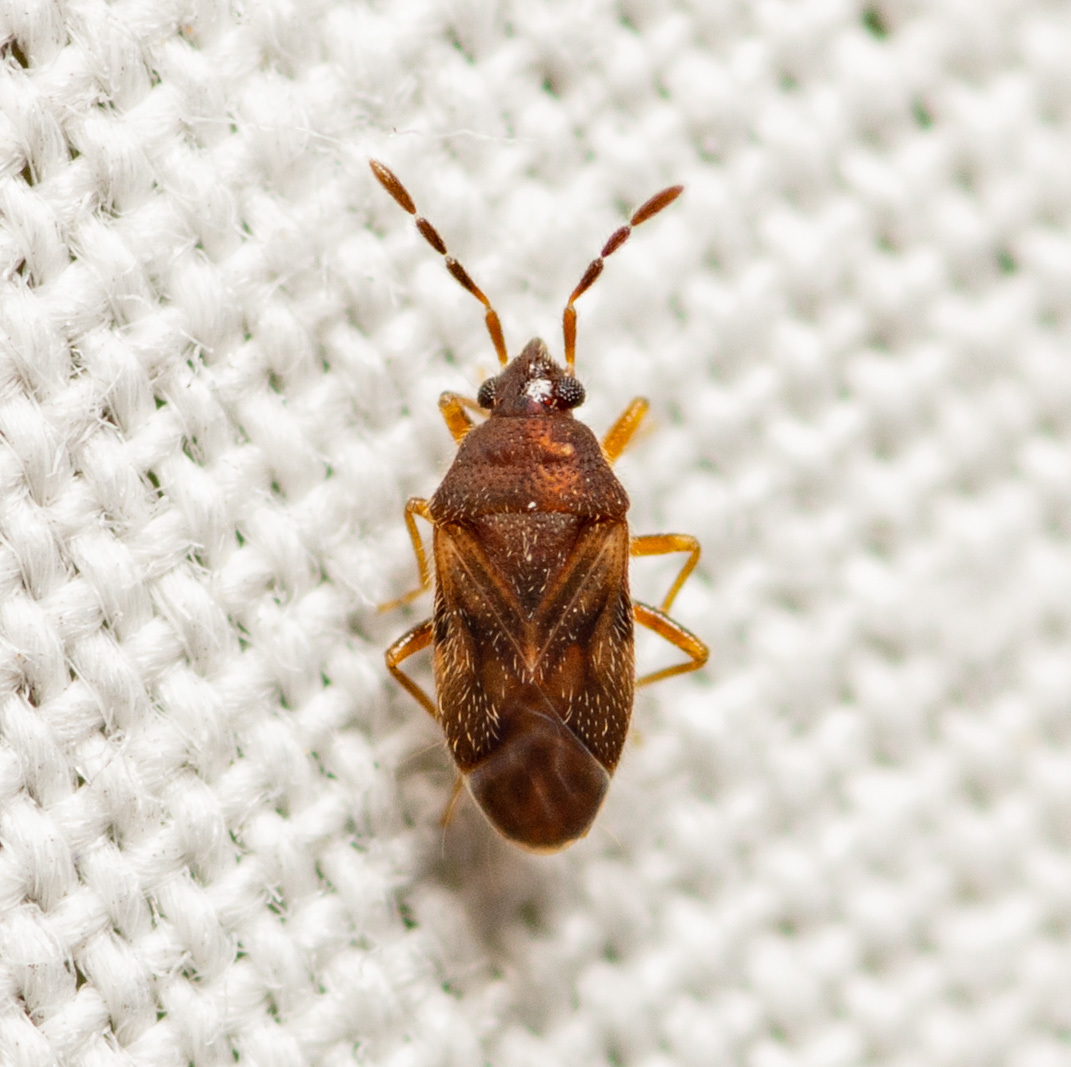
- Antillocoris discretus

Scientific classification
- Domain: Eukaryota
- Kingdom: Animalia
- Phylum: Arthropoda
- Class: Insecta
- Order: Hemiptera
- Suborder: Heteroptera
- Family: Rhyparochromidae
- Subfamily: Rhyparochrominae
- Tribe: Antillocorini
- Genus: Antillocoris; Kirkaldy, 1904

= Antillocoris =

Genus of true bugs

Antillocoris is a genus of dirt-colored seed bugs in the family Rhyparochromidae. There are at least four described species in Antillocoris.

== Species ==
These four species belong to the genus Antillocoris:

- Antillocoris discretus Barber, 1952
- Antillocoris minutus (Bergroth, 1895)
- Antillocoris pallidus (Uhler, 1894)
- Antillocoris pilosulus (Stal, 1874)
