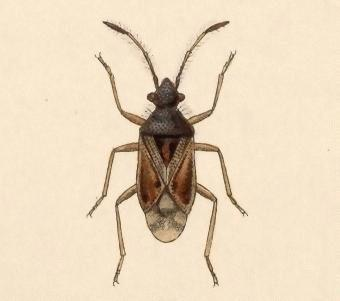
- Acolhua championi

Scientific classification
- Domain: Eukaryota
- Kingdom: Animalia
- Phylum: Arthropoda
- Class: Insecta
- Order: Hemiptera
- Suborder: Heteroptera
- Family: Rhyparochromidae
- Subfamily: Rhyparochrominae
- Tribe: Antillocorini

= Antillocorini =

Tribe of true bugs

Antillocorini is a tribe of dirt-colored seed bugs in the family Rhyparochromidae. There are more than 30 genera and 110 described species in Antillocorini.

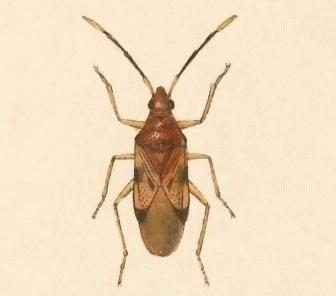
Scythinus splendens

== Genera ==
These 35 genera belong to the tribe Antillocorini:

- Acolhua Distant, 1893
- Antillocoris Kirkaldy, 1904
- Antillodema Slater, 1980
- Arimacoris Baranowski & Slater, 1987
- Baeocoris Slater, 1983
- Bathydema Uhler, 1893
- Bocundostethus Scudder, 1962
- Botocudo Kirkaldy, 1904
- Branstettocoris Brailovsky, 2010
- Caeneusia Strand, 1928
- Caymanis Baranowski & Brambila, 2001
- Cligenes Distant, 1893
- Gemmacoris Baranowski & Slater, 1987
- Homoscelis Horvath, 1884
- Iodinus Lindberg, 1927
- Kinundastethus Scudder, 1962
- Lethaeaster Breddin, 1905
- Lethaeastroides Malipatil & Woodward, 1989
- Microcoris Bergroth, 1908
- Microlugenocoris Scudder, 1962
- Neopoliocoris Zhang & Chen, 2015
- Nympholethaeus Woodward, 1959
- Paradema Slater, 1980
- Paurocoris Slater, 1980
- Polycligenes Scudder, 1962
- Pulmomerus Cervantes & Brailovsky, 2012
- Schuhocoris Slater, 1985
- Scythinus Distant, 1893
- Siniasinensis Scudder, 1968
- Terenocoris Slater, 1980
- Tomocoris Woodward, 1953
- Tomocoroides Woodward, 1963
- Trachinocoris Slater, 1980
- Tropistethus Fieber, 1861
- Valeris Brambila, 2000
