= Eremocoris dimidiatus =

Scientific classification
- Domain: Eukaryota
- Kingdom: Animalia
- Phylum: Arthropoda
- Class: Insecta
- Order: Hemiptera
- Suborder: Heteroptera
- Family: Rhyparochromidae
- Tribe: Drymini
- Genus: Eremocoris
- Species: E. dimidiatus

Binomial name
- Eremocoris dimidiatus Van Duzee, 1921

Species of true bug

Eremocoris dimidiatus is a species of dirt-colored seed bug in the family Rhyparochromidae. It is found in North America.
