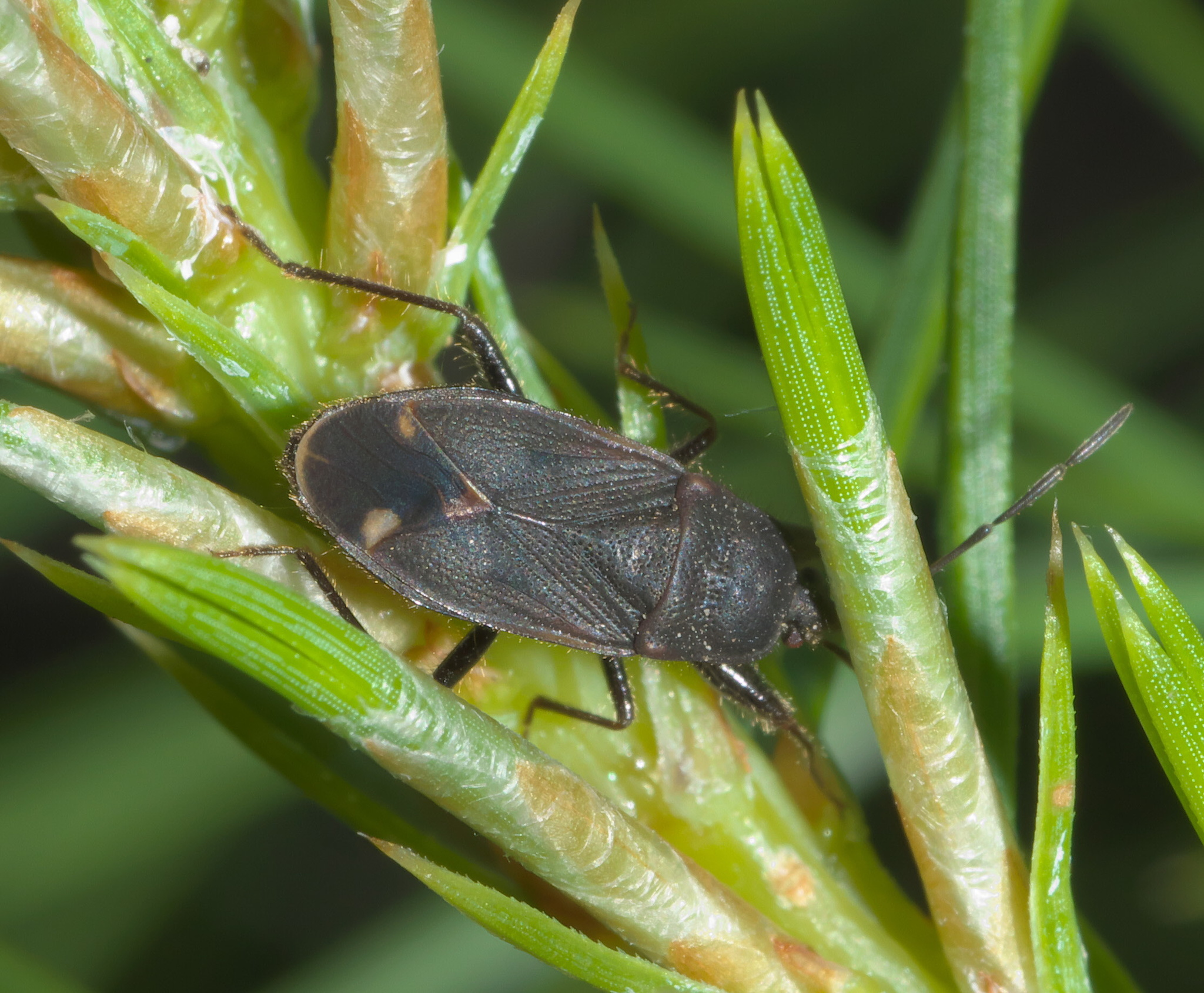
- Eremocoris setosus, Tennessee

Scientific classification
- Domain: Eukaryota
- Kingdom: Animalia
- Phylum: Arthropoda
- Class: Insecta
- Order: Hemiptera
- Suborder: Heteroptera
- Family: Rhyparochromidae
- Genus: Eremocoris
- Species: E. setosus

Binomial name
- Eremocoris setosus Blatchley, 1926

= Eremocoris setosus =

Species of true bug

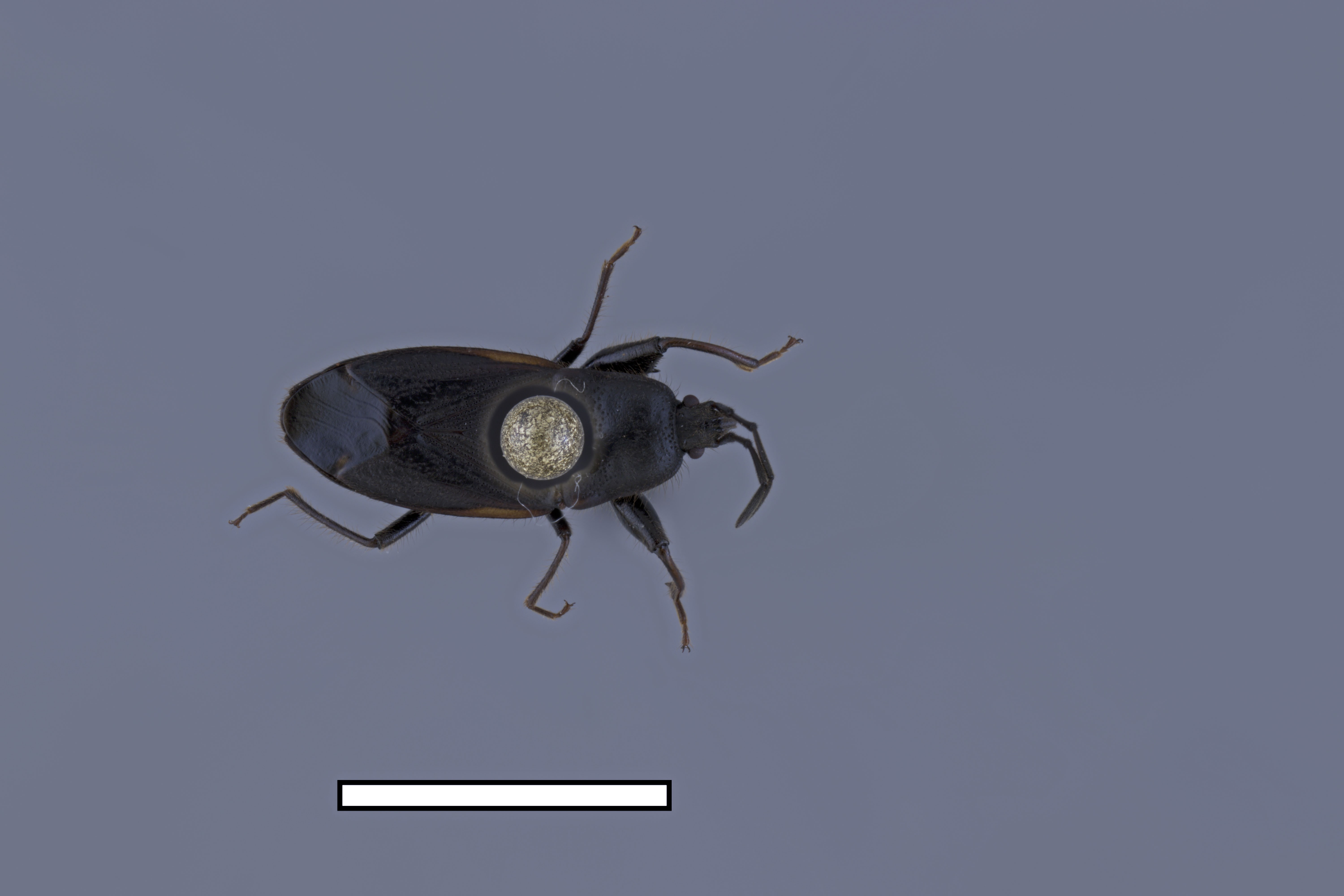
Figure 1. Eremocoris setosus Blatchley, 1926 collected in GA, Baldwin County on 13 September 2024 by S. Mears. Scale bar 1 cm

Eremocoris setosus is a species of dirt-colored seed bug in the family Rhyparochromidae. It is found in North America.
