= Eremocoris borealis =

Scientific classification
- Domain: Eukaryota
- Kingdom: Animalia
- Phylum: Arthropoda
- Class: Insecta
- Order: Hemiptera
- Suborder: Heteroptera
- Family: Rhyparochromidae
- Tribe: Drymini
- Genus: Eremocoris
- Species: E. borealis

Binomial name
- Eremocoris borealis (Dallas, 1852)

Species of true bug

Eremocoris borealis is a species of dirt-colored seed bug in the family Rhyparochromidae. It is found in North America.
