= Eremocoris depressus =

Scientific classification
- Domain: Eukaryota
- Kingdom: Animalia
- Phylum: Arthropoda
- Class: Insecta
- Order: Hemiptera
- Suborder: Heteroptera
- Family: Rhyparochromidae
- Tribe: Drymini
- Genus: Eremocoris
- Species: E. depressus

Binomial name
- Eremocoris depressus Barber, 1928

Species of true bug

Eremocoris depressus is a species of dirt-colored seed bug in the family Rhyparochromidae.
