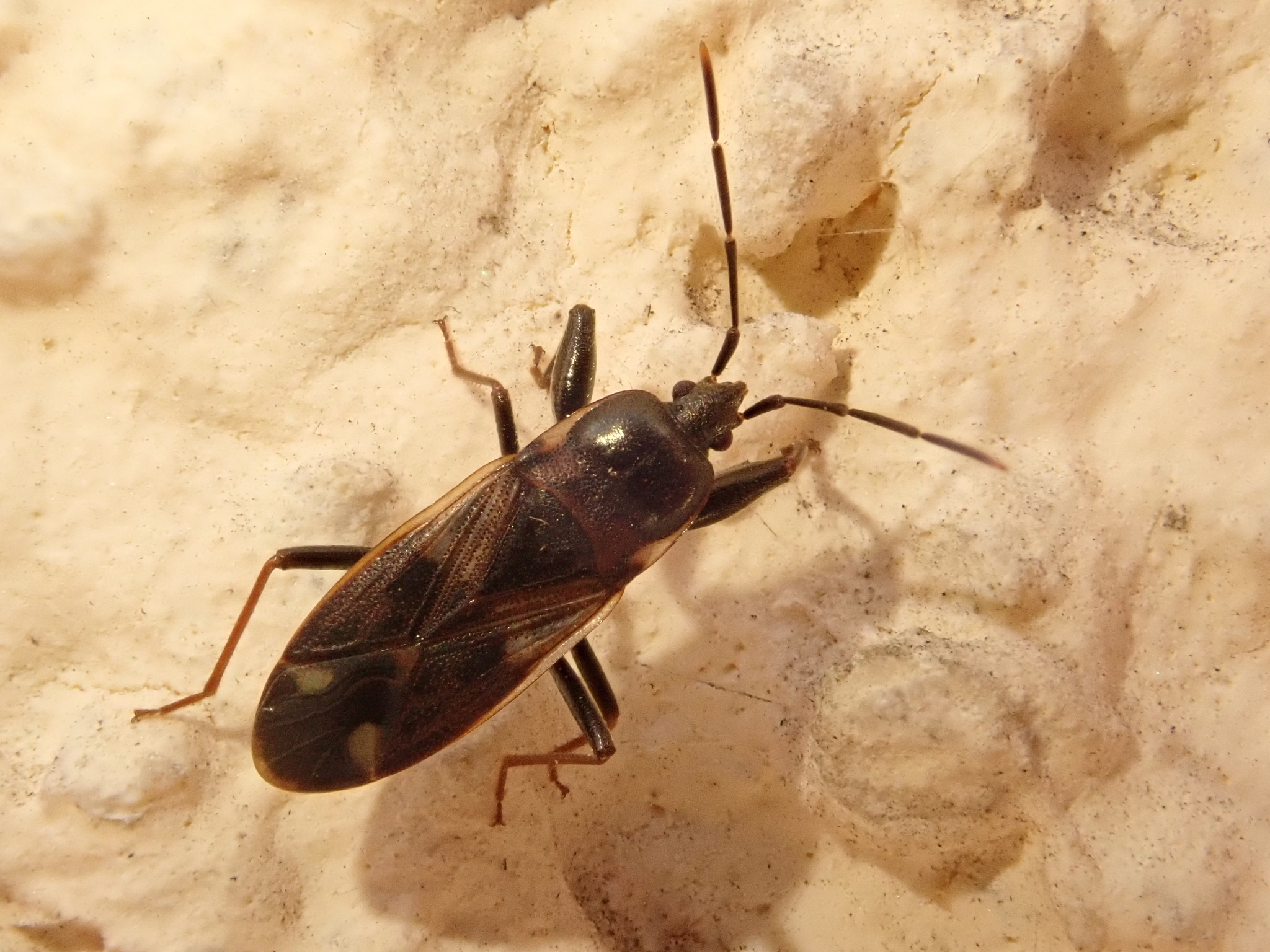
- Eremocoris fenestratus, Germany

Scientific classification
- Domain: Eukaryota
- Kingdom: Animalia
- Phylum: Arthropoda
- Class: Insecta
- Order: Hemiptera
- Suborder: Heteroptera
- Family: Rhyparochromidae
- Subfamily: Rhyparochrominae
- Tribe: Drymini
- Genus: Eremocoris
- Species: E. fenestratus

Binomial name
- Eremocoris fenestratus (Herrich-Schaeffer, 1839)

= Eremocoris fenestratus =

Species of dirt-colored seed bug

Eremocoris fenestratus is a species of dirt-colored seed bug in the family Rhyparochromidae, found in the Palearctic.
