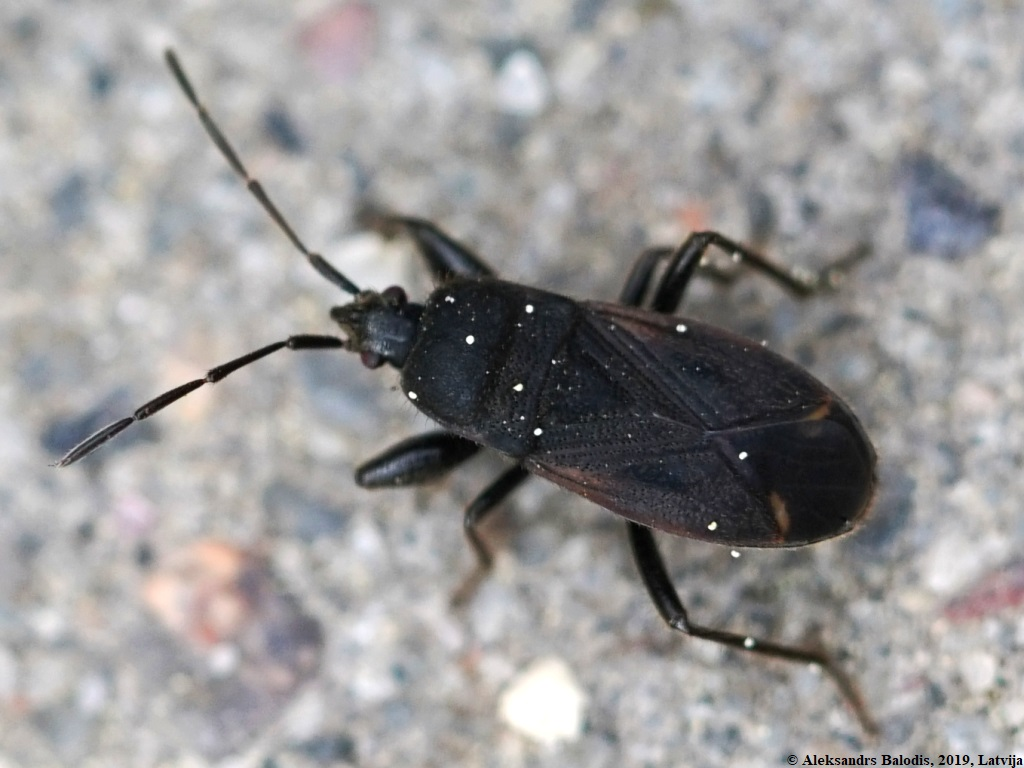
- Eremocoris plebejus

Scientific classification
- Kingdom: Animalia
- Phylum: Arthropoda
- Class: Insecta
- Order: Hemiptera
- Suborder: Heteroptera
- Family: Rhyparochromidae
- Tribe: Drymini
- Genus: Eremocoris; Fieber, 1860

= Eremocoris =

Genus of true bugs

Eremocoris is a genus of dirt-colored seed bugs in the family Rhyparochromidae. There are at least 45 described species in the genus Eremocoris.

== Species ==
These 45 species belong to the genus Eremocoris:

- Eremocoris abietis (Linnaeus, 1758)
- Eremocoris africanus Slater, 1964
- Eremocoris angusticollis Jakovlev, B.E., 1881
- Eremocoris arnaudi Brailovsky, 1982
- Eremocoris bletoni Vidal, J.P., 1940
- Eremocoris borealis (Dallas, 1852)
- Eremocoris canadensis Walley, 1929
- Eremocoris chalmaensis Brailovsky & Barrera, 1981
- Eremocoris cupressicola Ashlock, 1979
- Eremocoris depressus Barber, 1928
- Eremocoris dimidiatus Van Duzee, 1921
- Eremocoris extremus Brailovsky & Cervantes, 1989
- Eremocoris fenestratus (Herrich-Schaeffer, 1839)
- Eremocoris ferus (Say, 1832)
- Eremocoris fraternus Horvath, G., 1883
- Eremocoris garciai Brailovsky & Barrera, 1981
- Eremocoris gracilis Linnavuori, 1968
- Eremocoris guerrerensis Brailovsky & Barrera, 1981
- Eremocoris hirashimai Hidaka, T., 1963
- Eremocoris indicus Breddin, G., 1907
- Eremocoris inquilinus Van Duzee, 1914
- Eremocoris insularis Kerzhner, 1977
- Eremocoris juquilianus Cervantes, L., H. Brailovsky & Baez Santacruz, 201
- Eremocoris kenyensis Scudder, 1962
- Eremocoris legionarius Brailovsky & Barrera, 1981
- Eremocoris lopez-formenti Brailovsky & Barrera, 1981
- Eremocoris maderensis (Wollaston, T.V., 1858)
- Eremocoris melanotus Walley, 1929
- Eremocoris mimbresianus Brailovsky & Cervantes, 1989
- Eremocoris monticola Horvath, G., 1929
- Eremocoris oblitus Horvath, G., 1929
- Eremocoris obscuratus Montandon, A.L., 1895
- Eremocoris obscurus Van Duzee, 1906
- Eremocoris opacus Van Duzee, 1921
- Eremocoris pellitus Seidenstucker, 1965
- Eremocoris plebejus (Fallen, C.F., 1807)
- Eremocoris podagricus Fabricius, J.C., 1775
- Eremocoris praenotatus Seidenstucker, 1965
- Eremocoris procerus Kiritshenko, A.N., 1952
- Eremocoris ribauti Vidal, J.P., 1936
- Eremocoris semicinctus Van Duzee, 1921
- Eremocoris setosus Blatchley, 1926
- Eremocoris shirozui Hidaka, 1965
- Eremocoris sinicus Zheng, 1981
- Eremocoris squalidus Brailovsky & Barrera, 1981
