= Heraeus coquilletti =

Scientific classification
- Domain: Eukaryota
- Kingdom: Animalia
- Phylum: Arthropoda
- Class: Insecta
- Order: Hemiptera
- Suborder: Heteroptera
- Family: Rhyparochromidae
- Tribe: Myodochini
- Genus: Heraeus
- Species: H. coquilletti

Binomial name
- Heraeus coquilletti Barber, 1914

Species of true bug

Heraeus coquilletti is a species of dirt-colored seed bug in the family Rhyparochromidae. It is found in North America.
