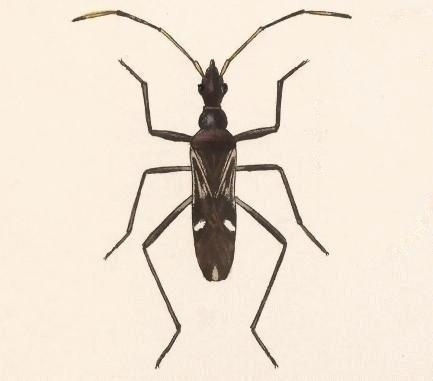
- Heraeus eximius

Scientific classification
- Kingdom: Animalia
- Phylum: Arthropoda
- Clade: Pancrustacea
- Class: Insecta
- Order: Hemiptera
- Suborder: Heteroptera
- Family: Rhyparochromidae
- Tribe: Myodochini
- Genus: Heraeus; Stål, 1862

= Heraeus (bug) =

Genus of true bugs

Heraeus is a genus of dirt-colored seed bugs in the family Rhyparochromidae. There are at least 40 described species in Heraeus.

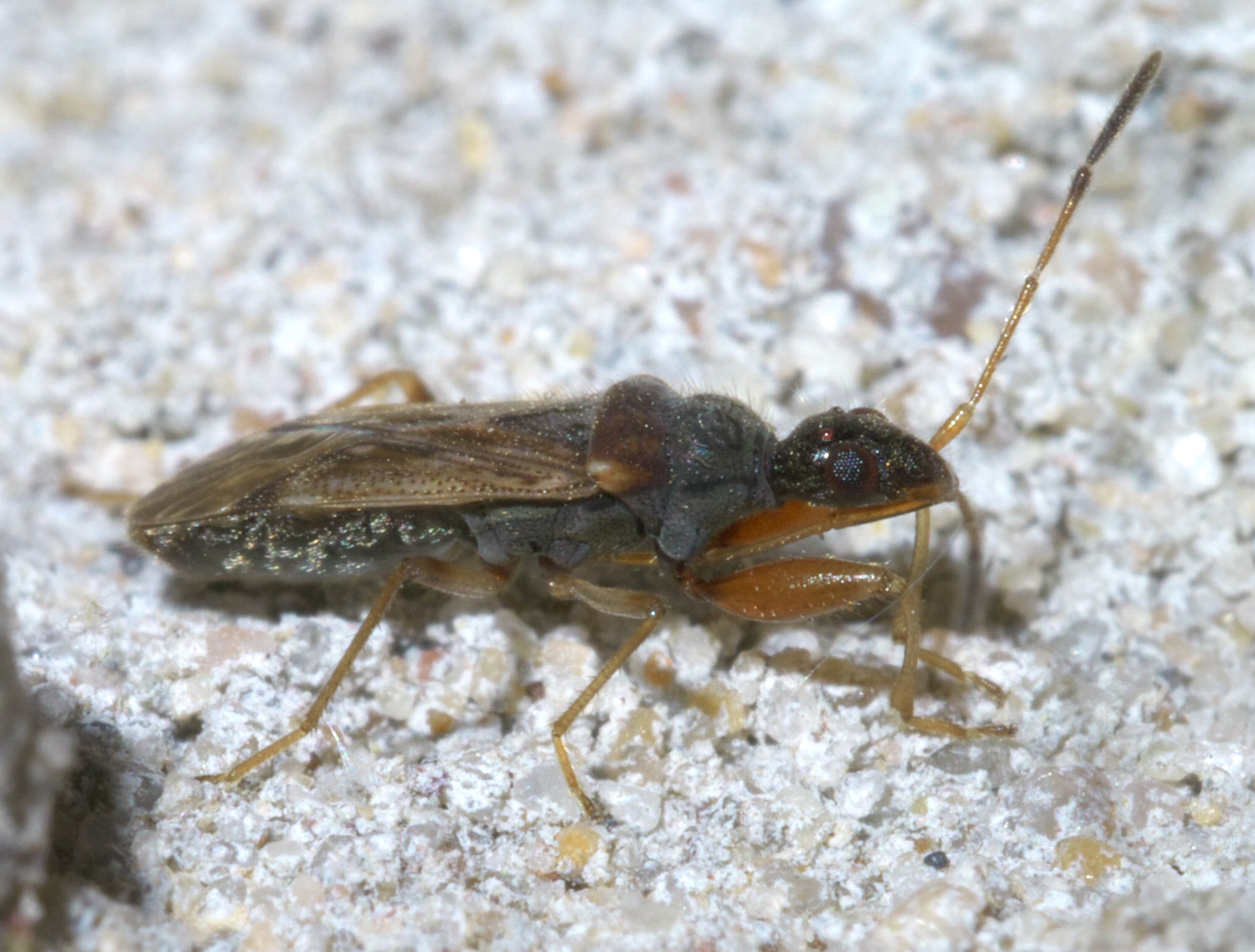
Heraeus plebejus

== Species ==
These 40 species belong to the genus Heraeus:

- Heraeus alvarengai Dellapé, P. M., Melo & Henry, 2016^{c g}
- Heraeus annulatus Dellapé, P. M., Melo & Henry, 2016^{c g}
- Heraeus antennalis Dellapé, P. M., Melo & Henry, 2016^{c g}
- Heraeus apicalis Dellapé, P. M., Melo & Henry, 2016^{c}
- Heraeus bahiensis Dellapé, P. M., Melo & Henry, 2016^{c g}
- Heraeus baranowskii Dellapé, P. M., Melo & Henry, 2016^{c g}
- Heraeus bolivianus Dellapé, P. M., Melo & Henry, 2016^{c g}
- Heraeus brevirostris Dellapé, P. M., Melo & Henry, 2016^{c}
- Heraeus caliginosus Slater, J.A. & R.M. Baranowski, 1994^{c g}
- Heraeus chamamecinus Dellapé, P. M., Melo & Henry, 2016^{c g}
- Heraeus cinnamomeus Barber, 1948^{i c g}
- Heraeus concolor Slater, J.A. & R.M. Baranowski, 1994^{c g}
- Heraeus coquilletti Barber, 1914^{i c g b}
- Heraeus costalis Dellapé, P. M., Melo & Henry, 2016^{c g}
- Heraeus dominicanus Dellapé, P. M., Melo & Henry, 2016^{c g}
- Heraeus ecuatorianus Dellapé, P. M., Melo & Henry, 2016^{c g}
- Heraeus eximius Distant, 1882^{i}
- Heraeus guttatus (Dallas, W.S., 1852)^{c g}
- Heraeus hollyae^{c g}
- Heraeus illitus Distant, W.L., 1882^{c g}
- Heraeus inca Dellapé, P. M., Melo & Henry, 2016^{c g}
- Heraeus itzelae Dellapé, P. M., Melo & Henry, 2016^{c g}
- Heraeus loja Dellapé, P. M., Melo & Henry, 2016^{c g}
- Heraeus mesoamericanus Dellapé, P. M., Melo & Henry, 2016^{c g}
- Heraeus mexicanus Dellapé, P. M., Melo & Henry, 2016^{c g}
- Heraeus morganae Dellapé, P. M., Melo & Henry, 2016^{c g}
- Heraeus nicaraguensis Dellapé, P. M., Melo & Henry, 2016^{c g}
- Heraeus pacificus Barber, H.G., 1925^{c g}
- Heraeus pallidinervis Dellapé, P. M., Melo & Henry, 2016^{c g}
- Heraeus panamaensis Dellapé, P. M., Melo & Henry, 2016^{c g}
- Heraeus penai Dellapé, P. M., Melo & Henry, 2016^{c g}
- Heraeus plebejus Stal, 1874^{i c g b}
- Heraeus pulchellus Barber, H.G., 1954^{c g}
- Heraeus setosus Dellapé, P. M., Melo & Henry, 2016^{c g}
- Heraeus similis Dellapé, P. M., Melo & Henry, 2016^{c g}
- Heraeus spinosus Dellapé, P. M., Melo & Henry, 2016^{c g}
- Heraeus splendens Dellapé, P. M., Melo & Henry, 2016^{c g}
- Heraeus steineri Dellapé, P. M., Melo & Henry, 2016^{c g}
- Heraeus tiputini Dellapé, P. M., Melo & Henry, 2016^{c g}
- Heraeus triguttatus (Guérin-Méneville, 1857)^{i c g b}

Data sources: i = ITIS, c = Catalogue of Life, g = GBIF, b = Bugguide.net
