= Heraeus triguttatus =

Scientific classification
- Kingdom: Animalia
- Phylum: Arthropoda
- Clade: Pancrustacea
- Class: Insecta
- Order: Hemiptera
- Suborder: Heteroptera
- Family: Rhyparochromidae
- Genus: Heraeus
- Species: H. triguttatus

Binomial name
- Heraeus triguttatus (Guérin-Méneville, 1857)

Synonyms
- Lygaeus triguttatus Guérin-Méneville, 1857

Species of true bug

Heraeus triguttatus is a species of dirt-colored seed bug in the family Rhyparochromidae. It is found in the Caribbean Sea and North America.
