= List of Dieuches species =

These 138 species belong to Dieuches, a genus of dirt-colored seed bugs in the family Rhyparochromidae.

== Dieuches species ==
- Dieuches abundans Eyles, 1973
- Dieuches abyssiniae Eyles, 1973
- Dieuches africanus (Distant, 1918)
- Dieuches albomarginatus (Uhler, 1860)
- Dieuches albostriatus (Fabricius, 1803)
- Dieuches alternatus Horvath, 1889
- Dieuches annobonensis Eyles, 1973
- Dieuches annulatus (Signoret, 1860)
- Dieuches armatipes (Walker, 1872)
- Dieuches armipes (Fabricius, 1794)
- Dieuches basiceps Eyles, 1973
- Dieuches beviceps Eyles, 1973
- Dieuches braunsi Eyles, 1973
- Dieuches brevirostris Eyles, 1973
- Dieuches chinensis (Dallas, 1852)
- Dieuches coenosus (Stal, 1865)
- Dieuches coloratus (Distant, 1909)
- Dieuches consanguineus Distant, 1904
- Dieuches consimilis Distant, 1918
- Dieuches conspicuus Eyles, 1973
- Dieuches constrictus Eyles, 1973
- Dieuches crinitus Eyles, 1973
- Dieuches curvus Eyles, 1973
- Dieuches dasys Eyles, 1973
- Dieuches diabolus Eyles, 1973
- Dieuches discoguttatus (Distant, 1918)
- Dieuches distanti Bergroth, 1916
- Dieuches divergens Eyles, 1973
- Dieuches duplex Eyles, 1973
- Dieuches elgonensis Eyles, 1973
- Dieuches embolicus Deckert & Eyles, 2002
- Dieuches eminens Eyles, 1973
- Dieuches etemporalis Eyles, 1973
- Dieuches exiguus Eyles, 1973
- Dieuches expandens Eyles, 1973
- Dieuches exsertus Eyles, 1973
- Dieuches feai Eyles, 1973
- Dieuches femoralis Dohrn, 1860
- Dieuches flavipes Haglund, 1895
- Dieuches forbesii (Kirkaldy, 1899)
- Dieuches formosus Eyles, 1973
- Dieuches fuscans Distant, 1904
- Dieuches fuscus Reuter, 1887
- Dieuches gracilicrus Eyles, 1973
- Dieuches grandicus Gross & Scudder, 1963
- Dieuches herero Breddin, 1913
- Dieuches hirsutus Gross & Scudder, 1963
- Dieuches humilis Reuter, 1887
- Dieuches hypocritus Bergroth, 1915
- Dieuches inarmatus Eyles, 1973
- Dieuches incisus Eyles, 1973
- Dieuches indicus Eyles, 1973
- Dieuches insignis (Distant, 1904)
- Dieuches japonicus Hidaka & Eyles, 1968
- Dieuches junctus Eyles, 1973
- Dieuches kalungwisiensis Eyles, 1973
- Dieuches kansuensis Lindberg, 1934
- Dieuches lateralis Signoret, 1863
- Dieuches laticeps Eyles, 1973
- Dieuches leucoceras (Walker, 1872)
- Dieuches levis Eyles, 1973
- Dieuches licinus Eyles, 1973
- Dieuches lilliputanus Eyles, 1973
- Dieuches linnavuorii Eyles, 1973
- Dieuches longiceps Eyles, 1973
- Dieuches longicollis (Dallas, 1852)
- Dieuches maculicollis (Walker, 1872)
- Dieuches major Eyles, 1973
- Dieuches marginipennis (Stal, 1855)
- Dieuches megalops Eyles, 1973
- Dieuches membranaceus Eyles, 1973
- Dieuches microtropis Eyles, 1973
- Dieuches mixtus Eyles, 1973
- Dieuches modestus Horvath, 1888
- Dieuches mucronatus (Stal, 1865)
- Dieuches neavei Eyles, 1973
- Dieuches neolateralis Scudder, 1962
- Dieuches nitens Eyles, 1973
- Dieuches notatus (Dallas, 1852)
- Dieuches nudus Gross & Scudder, 1963
- Dieuches obscuripes (Walker, 1872)
- Dieuches oceanicus (Distant, 1901)
- Dieuches ochromus Eyles, 1995
- Dieuches opaciclavus Eyles, 1973
- Dieuches ornatus (Distant, 1918)
- Dieuches osellai Carapezza, 2006
- Dieuches pallidocoxis Eyles, 1973
- Dieuches pamelae Eyles, 1973
- Dieuches parallelus Eyles, 1973
- Dieuches parvimaculatus Tomokuni, 1993
- Dieuches parvipictus Distant, 1918
- Dieuches patrizii Mancini, 1948
- Dieuches patruelis (Stal, 1855)
- Dieuches philippinensis Eyles, 1973
- Dieuches pinguis Eyles, 1973
- Dieuches placidus (Stal, 1865)
- Dieuches planus Eyles, 1973
- Dieuches projectus Eyles, 1973
- Dieuches prolixus Eyles, 1973
- Dieuches proximus Eyles, 1973
- Dieuches punctipes Dohrn, 1860
- Dieuches purpureus Eyles, 1973
- Dieuches rectangularis Eyles, 1973
- Dieuches relatus Distant, 1901
- Dieuches rhodesiae Eyles, 1973
- Dieuches riegeri Fábics & Kondorosy, 2014
- Dieuches sagittatus Eyles, 1973
- Dieuches schmitzi Reuter, 1893
- Dieuches scioensis Lethierry, 1881
- Dieuches scudderi Eyles, 1973
- Dieuches scutellatus Distant, 1904
- Dieuches semidolens (Walker, 1870)
- Dieuches siamicus (Walker, 1872)
- Dieuches signatipennis Eyles, 1973
- Dieuches similis Mancini, 1948
- Dieuches slateri Eyles, 1973
- Dieuches sloggetti Distant, 1918
- Dieuches smithi Distant, 1918
- Dieuches solus Eyles, 1973
- Dieuches stenus Eyles, 1973
- Dieuches subcoxalis Eyles, 1973
- Dieuches subvectus Eyles, 1973
- Dieuches suratensis (Distant, 1909)
- Dieuches syriacus Dohrn, 1860
- Dieuches tenuis Eyles, 1973
- Dieuches torpidus Gross & Scudder, 1963
- Dieuches trapeziformis Eyles, 1973
- Dieuches triangulus Eyles, 1973
- Dieuches tropis Eyles, 1973
- Dieuches tuberculatus Mancini, 1948
- Dieuches turneri Eyles, 1973
- Dieuches ugandensis (Distant, 1918)
- Dieuches umbrifer (Stal, 1855)
- Dieuches uniformis Distant, 1904
- Dieuches vexans Schouteden, 1957
- Dieuches vilis Eyles, 1973
- Dieuches virgatus Eyles, 1973
- Dieuches wittei Eyles, 1973
