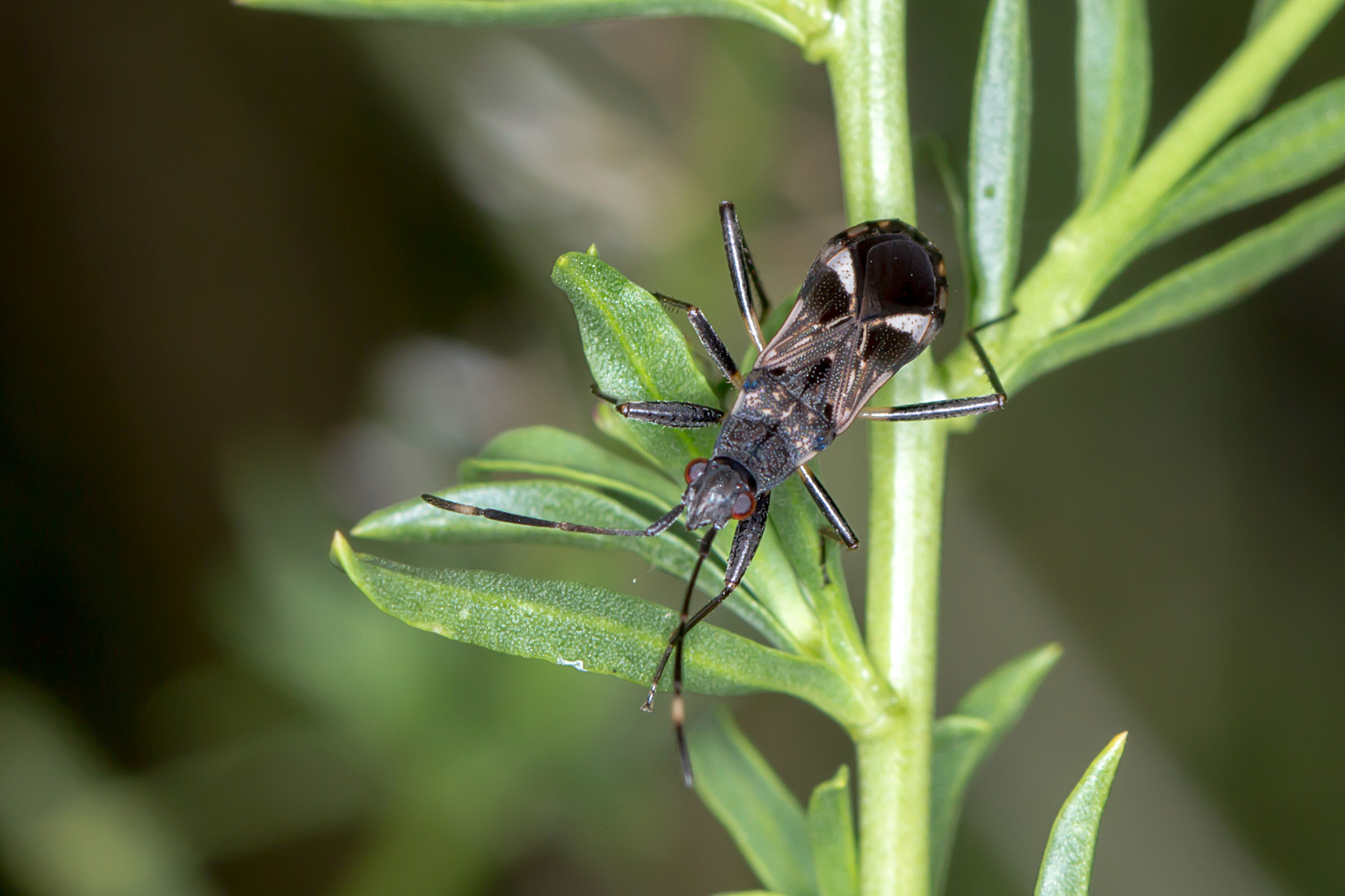
- Dieuches notatus, Australia

Scientific classification
- Domain: Eukaryota
- Kingdom: Animalia
- Phylum: Arthropoda
- Class: Insecta
- Order: Hemiptera
- Suborder: Heteroptera
- Family: Rhyparochromidae
- Subfamily: Rhyparochrominae
- Tribe: Rhyparochromini
- Genus: Dieuches
- Species: D. notatus

Binomial name
- Dieuches notatus (Dallas, 1852)

= Dieuches notatus =

Species of dirt-colored seed bug

Dieuches notatus is a species of dirt-colored seed bug in the family Rhyparochromidae found in Australia and New Zealand.
