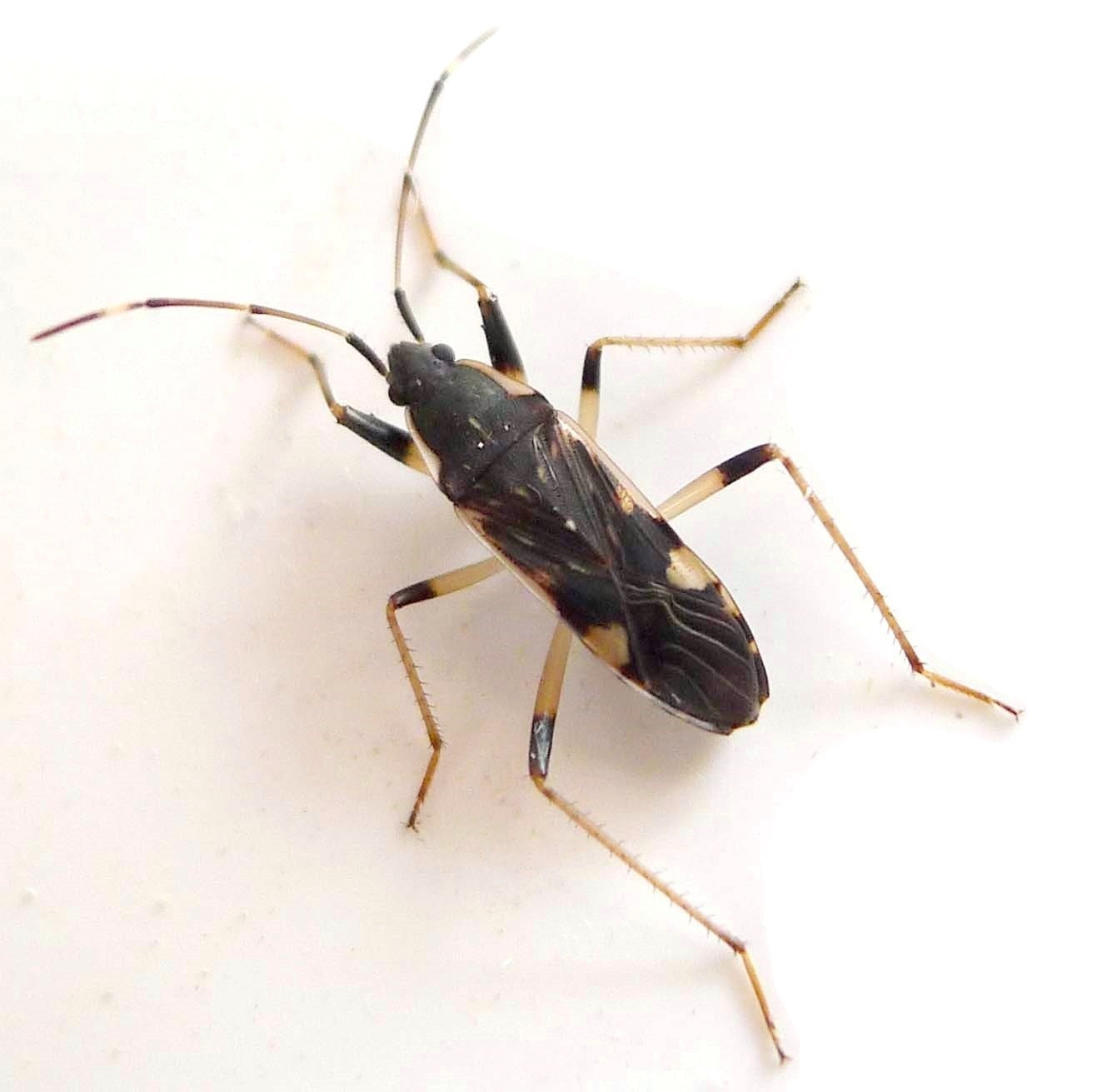
- Dieuches armatipes

Scientific classification
- Domain: Eukaryota
- Kingdom: Animalia
- Phylum: Arthropoda
- Class: Insecta
- Order: Hemiptera
- Suborder: Heteroptera
- Family: Rhyparochromidae
- Subfamily: Rhyparochrominae
- Tribe: Rhyparochromini
- Genus: Dieuches; Dohrn, 1860

Diversity
- at least 130 species

= Dieuches (bug) =

Genus of insects

Dieuches is a genus of dirt-colored seed bugs in the family Rhyparochromidae. There are more than 130 described species in Dieuches.

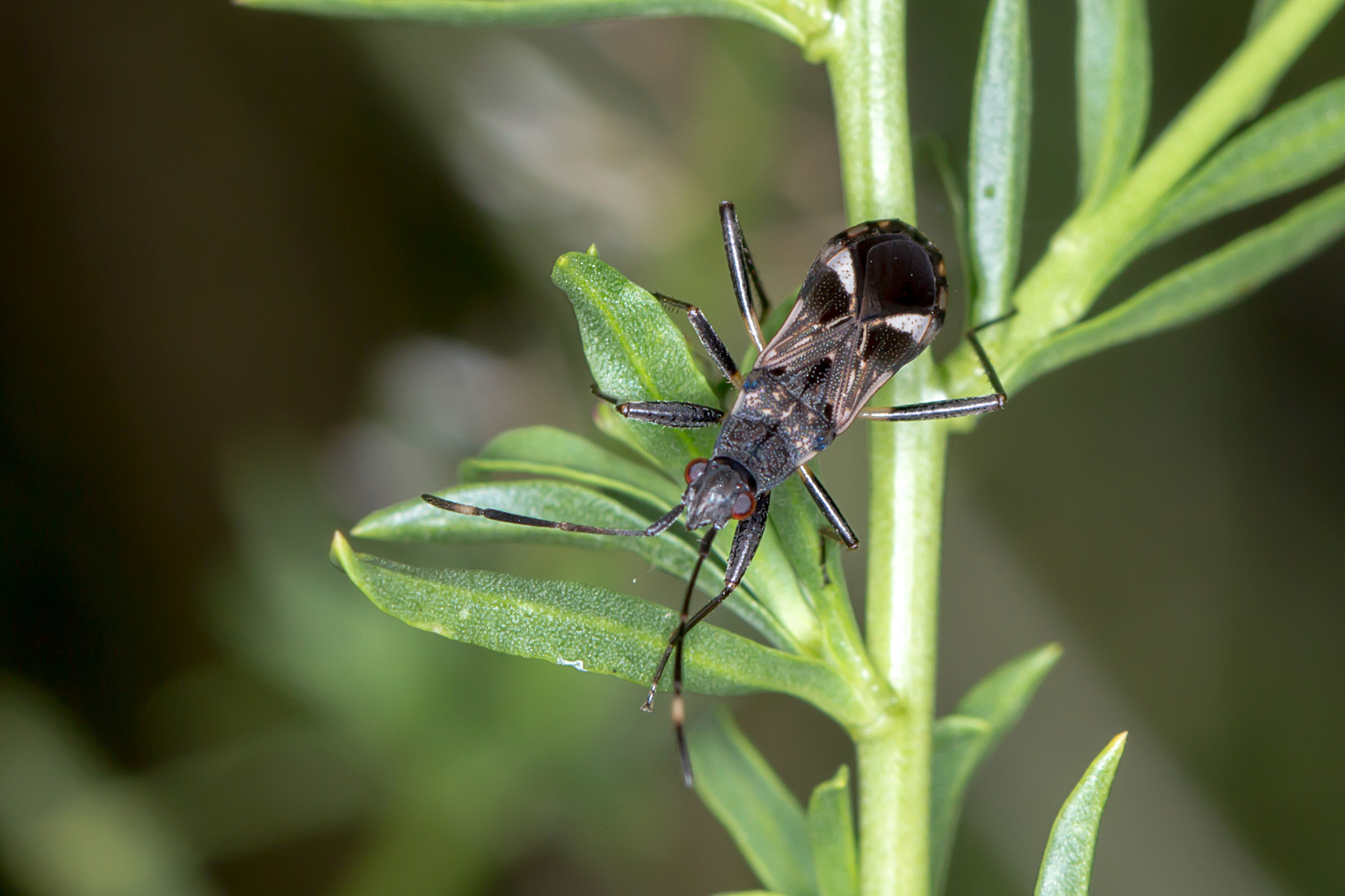
Dieuches notatus, Australia

== See also ==
- List of Dieuches species
