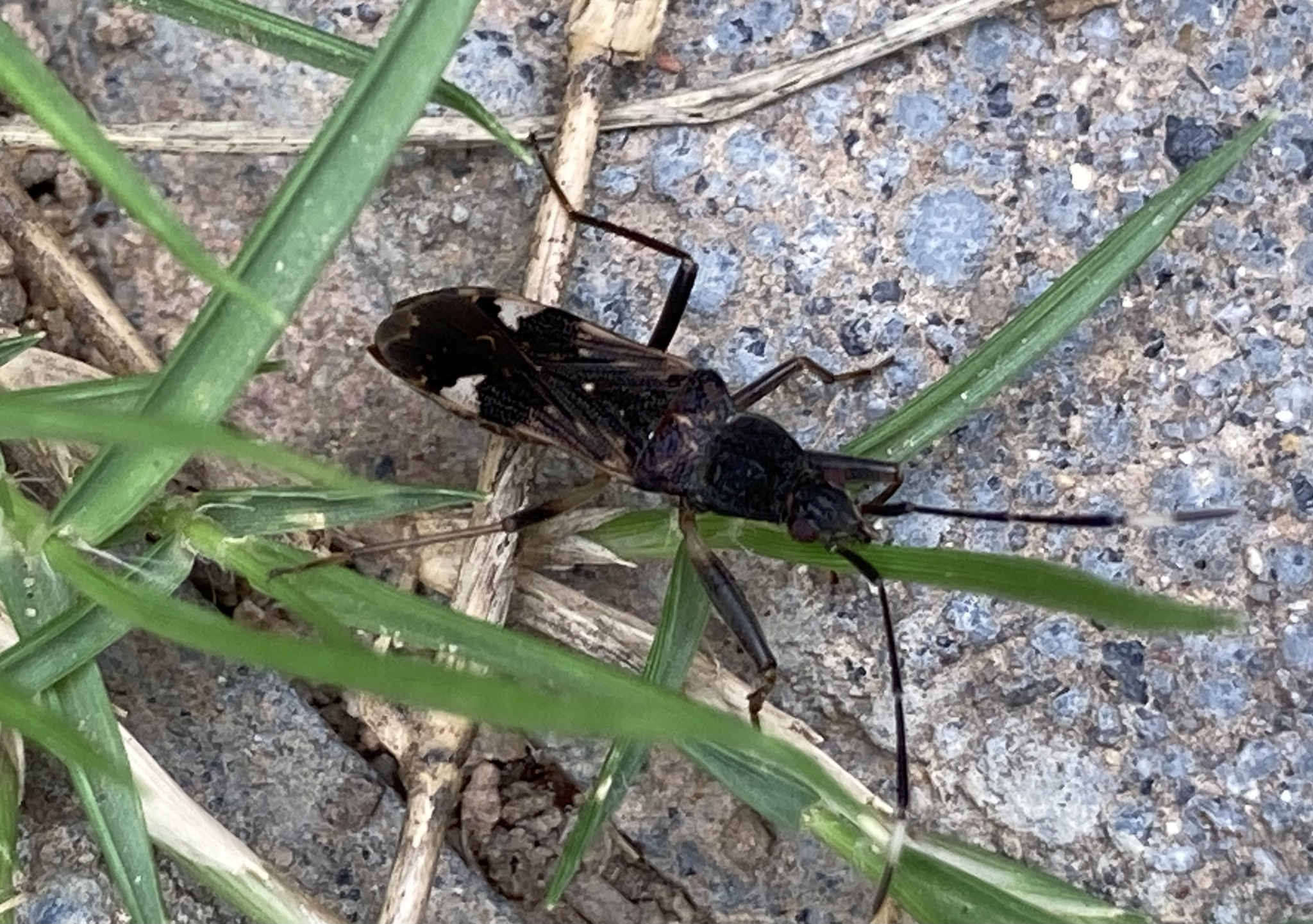
- Metochus abbreviatus, China

Scientific classification
- Kingdom: Animalia
- Phylum: Arthropoda
- Clade: Pancrustacea
- Class: Insecta
- Order: Hemiptera
- Suborder: Heteroptera
- Family: Rhyparochromidae
- Subfamily: Rhyparochrominae
- Tribe: Rhyparochromini
- Genus: Metochus
- Species: M. abbreviatus

Binomial name
- Metochus abbreviatus Scott, 1874

= Metochus abbreviatus =

Species of dirt-colored seed bug

Metochus abbreviatus is a species of dirt-colored seed bug in the family Rhyparochromidae, found in eastern and Southeast Asia.
