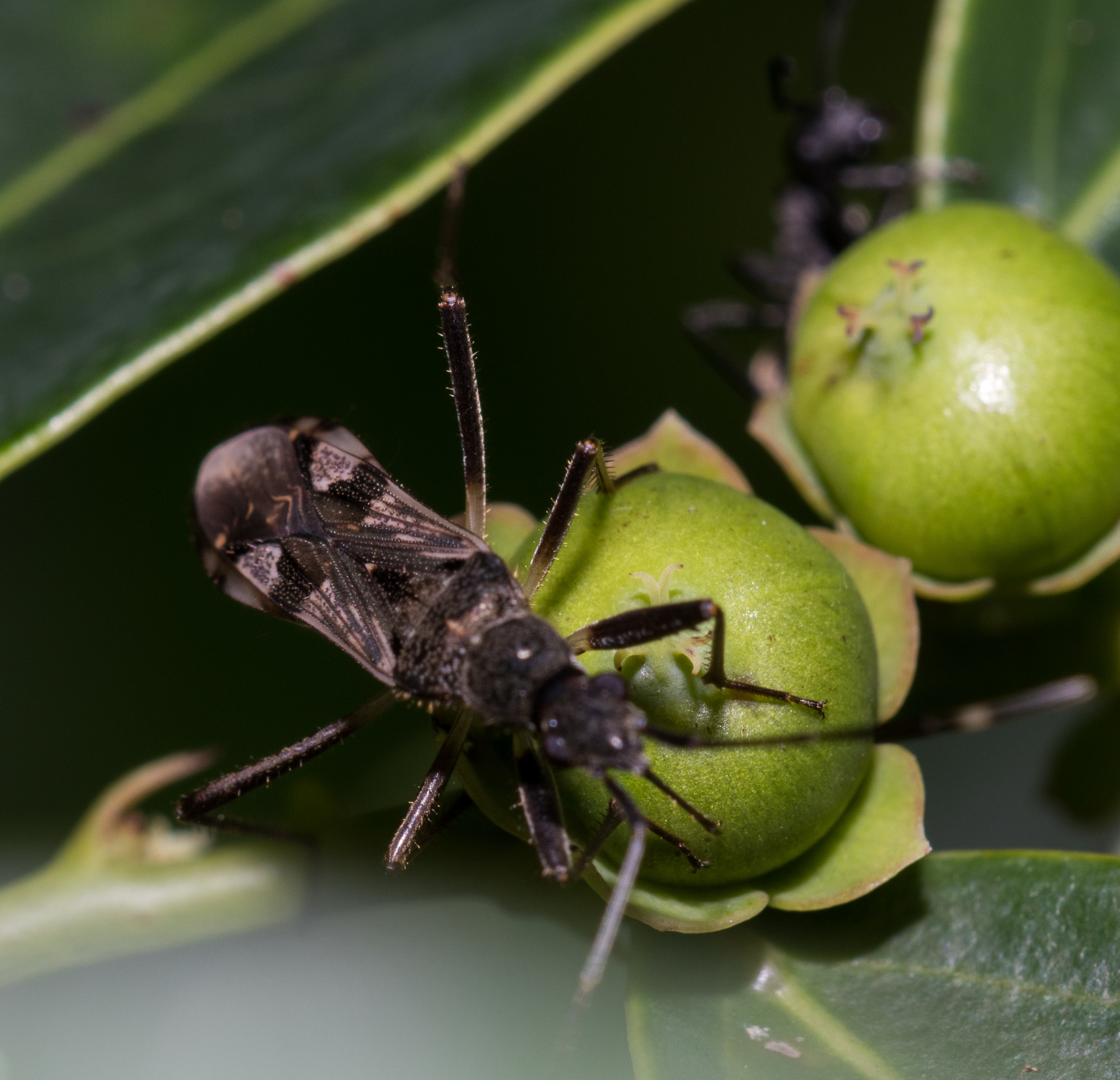
- Metochus uniguttatus, China

Scientific classification
- Kingdom: Animalia
- Phylum: Arthropoda
- Clade: Pancrustacea
- Class: Insecta
- Order: Hemiptera
- Suborder: Heteroptera
- Family: Rhyparochromidae
- Subfamily: Rhyparochrominae
- Tribe: Rhyparochromini
- Genus: Metochus
- Species: M. uniguttatus

Binomial name
- Metochus uniguttatus (Thunberg, 1822)

= Metochus uniguttatus =

Species of dirt-colored seed bug

Metochus uniguttatus is a species of dirt-colored seed bug in the family Rhyparochromidae, found in India and Southeast Asia.
