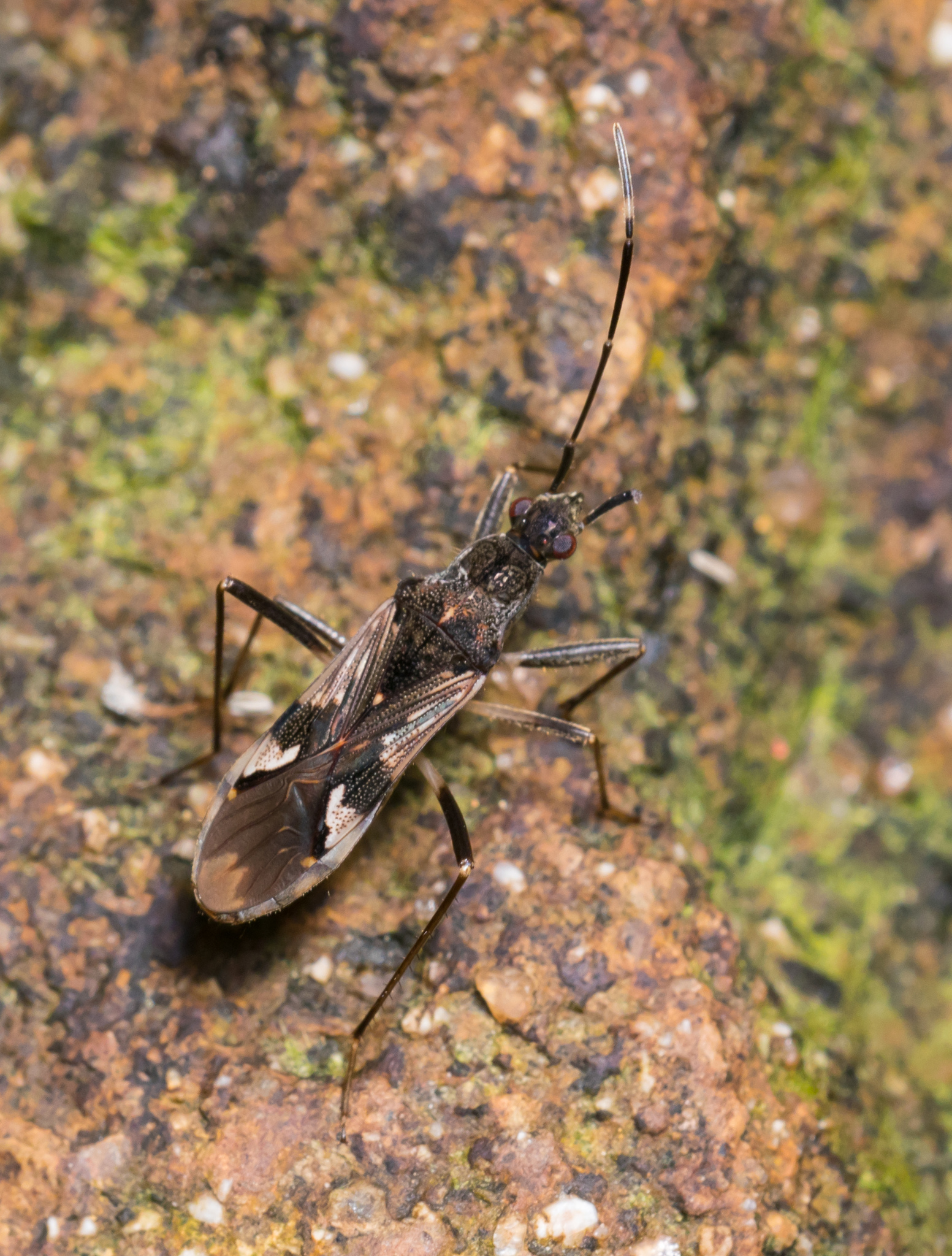
- Metochus hainanensis, Hong Kong

Scientific classification
- Domain: Eukaryota
- Kingdom: Animalia
- Phylum: Arthropoda
- Class: Insecta
- Order: Hemiptera
- Suborder: Heteroptera
- Family: Rhyparochromidae
- Subfamily: Rhyparochrominae
- Tribe: Rhyparochromini
- Genus: Metochus
- Species: M. hainanensis

Binomial name
- Metochus hainanensis Zheng & Zou, 1981

= Metochus hainanensis =

Species of true bug

Metochus hainanensis is a species of dirt-colored seed bug in the family Rhyparochromidae, found in eastern China and Taiwan.
