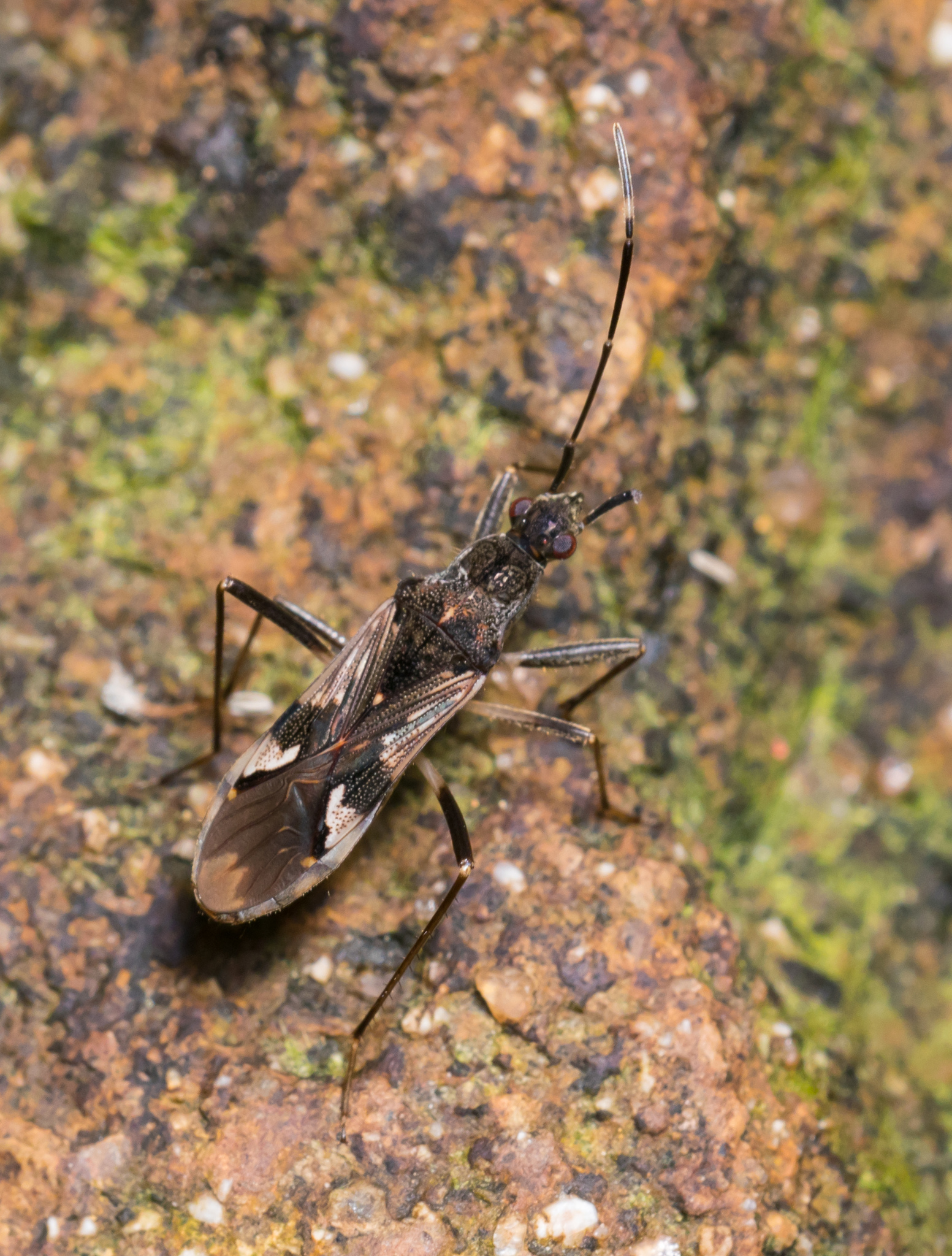
- Metochus hainanensis, Hong Kong

Scientific classification
- Domain: Eukaryota
- Kingdom: Animalia
- Phylum: Arthropoda
- Class: Insecta
- Order: Hemiptera
- Suborder: Heteroptera
- Family: Rhyparochromidae
- Subfamily: Rhyparochrominae
- Tribe: Rhyparochromini
- Genus: Metochus; Scott, 1874

= Metochus =

Genus of insects

Metochus is a genus of dirt-colored seed bugs in the family Rhyparochromidae. There are about 11 described species in Metochus, found in Indomalaya and eastern Asia.

== Species ==
These 11 species belong to the genus Metochus:

- Metochus abbreviatus Scott, 1874
- Metochus assimilis (Dallas, 1852)
- Metochus hainanensis Zheng & Zou, 1981
- Metochus horni (Breddin, 1906)
- Metochus jacobsoni (Breddin, 1906)
- Metochus nudipes (Breddin, 1906)
- Metochus procericornis (Breddin, 1908)
- Metochus schultheissi (Breddin, 1906)
- Metochus thoracicus Zheng & Zou, 1981
- Metochus uniguttatus (Thunberg, 1822)
- Metochus villosulus (Breddin, 1906)
