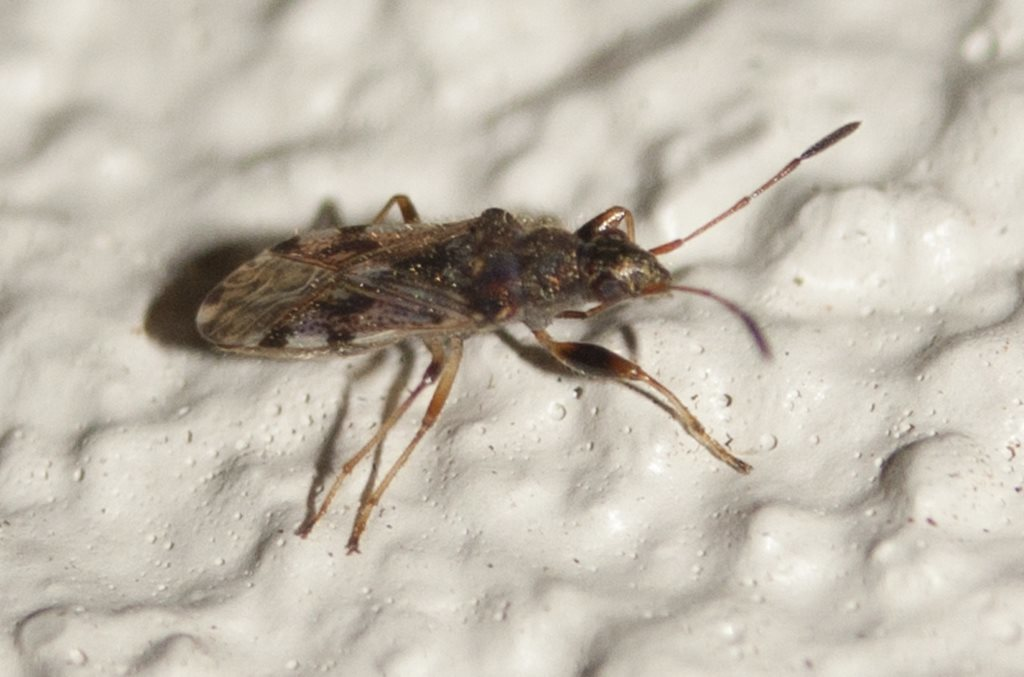
- Remaudiereana inornata

Scientific classification
- Domain: Eukaryota
- Kingdom: Animalia
- Phylum: Arthropoda
- Class: Insecta
- Order: Hemiptera
- Suborder: Heteroptera
- Family: Rhyparochromidae
- Subfamily: Rhyparochrominae
- Tribe: Myodochini
- Genus: Remaudiereana; Hoberlandt, 1954

= Remaudiereana =

Genus of insects

Remaudiereana is a genus of true bugs in the family Rhyparochromidae.

== Description ==
Remaudiereana have a robust and subovoid body with many long, curved, semi-erect hairs. The anterior of the pronotum has a narrow, impunctate "collar" and posterior to this is a deep groove. The lateral margins of both pronotal lobes are rounded. The clavus has punctures in four or more rows. The buccular juncture is V-shaped. The mesepimeron is enclosed. The evaporative area is extensive. The fore femur has a single row of spines along the inner edge of the ventral surface as well as a well-developed spine on the outer edge. In males, the fore tibia is curved and has a large spine in the middle, and the pygophore posterior edge has a shallow median groove in the lip.

== Ecology ==
Remaudiereana nigriceps is one of several species of bugs that forms swarms in the Northern Territory of Australia during the dry season. It is attracted to lights at night but is also known to swarm during the day. These bugs are attracted to white objects including floors, walls and clothing that has been hung out to dry. Remaudiereana nigriceps feeds on plant seeds lying on the ground and on grasses and weeds.

== Species ==
The following species are included in Remaudiereana:

- Remaudiereana annulipes (Baerensprung, 1859)
- Remaudiereana calcarata (Puton, 1874)
- Remaudiereana castanea (Van Duzee, 1932)
- Remaudiereana flavipes (Motschulsky, 1863)
- Remaudiereana horvathi (Reuter, 1882)
- Remaudiereana inornata (Walker, 1872)
- Remaudiereana nigra Scudder, 1963
- Remaudiereana nigriceps (Dallas, 1852)
- Remaudiereana octonotata (Bergroth, 1914)
- Remaudiereana puberula (China, 1930)
- Remaudiereana robusta (Malipatil, 1978)
- Remaudiereana sobrina (Distant, 1901)

== Gallery ==
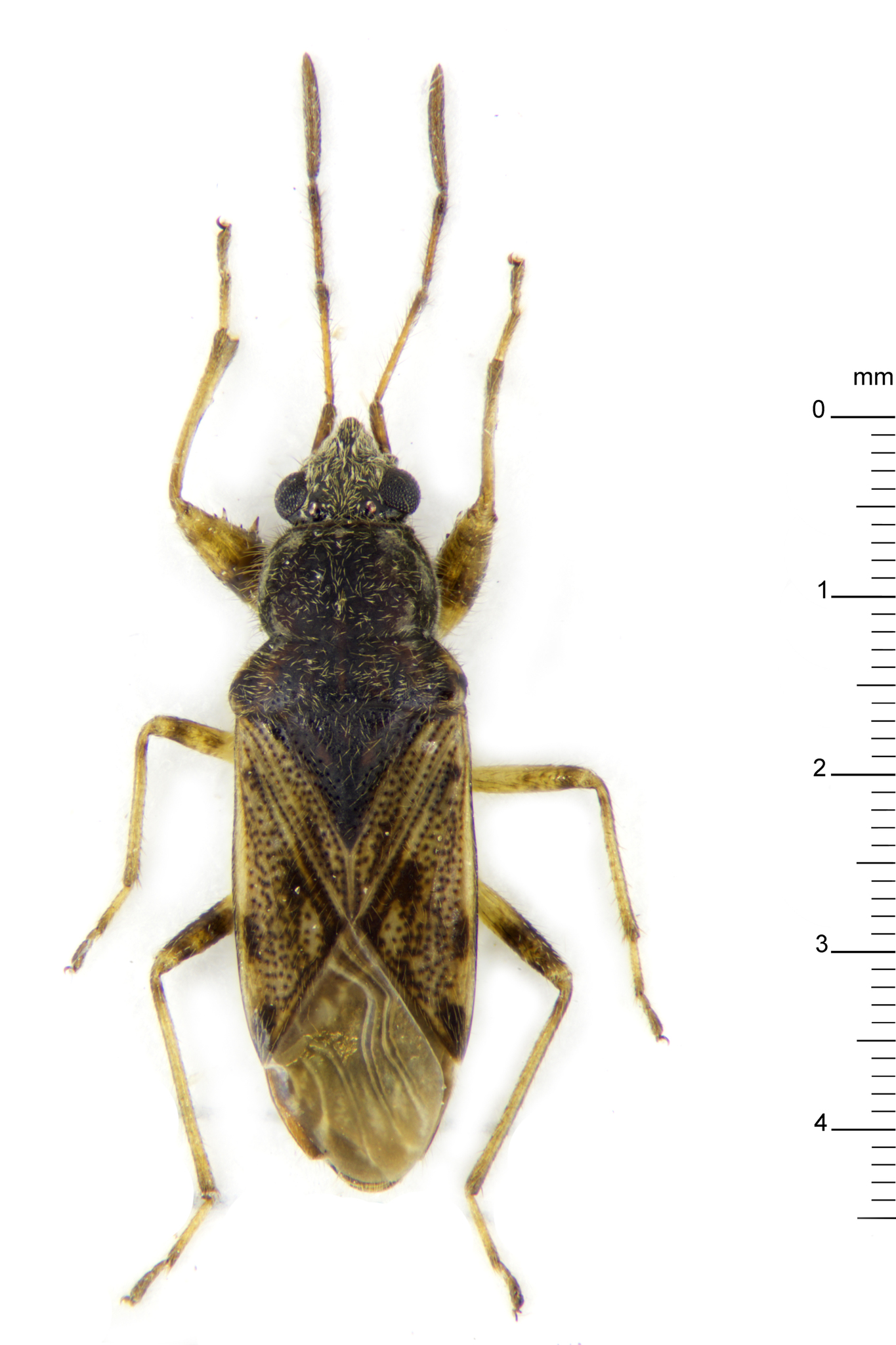
Remaudiereana nigriceps

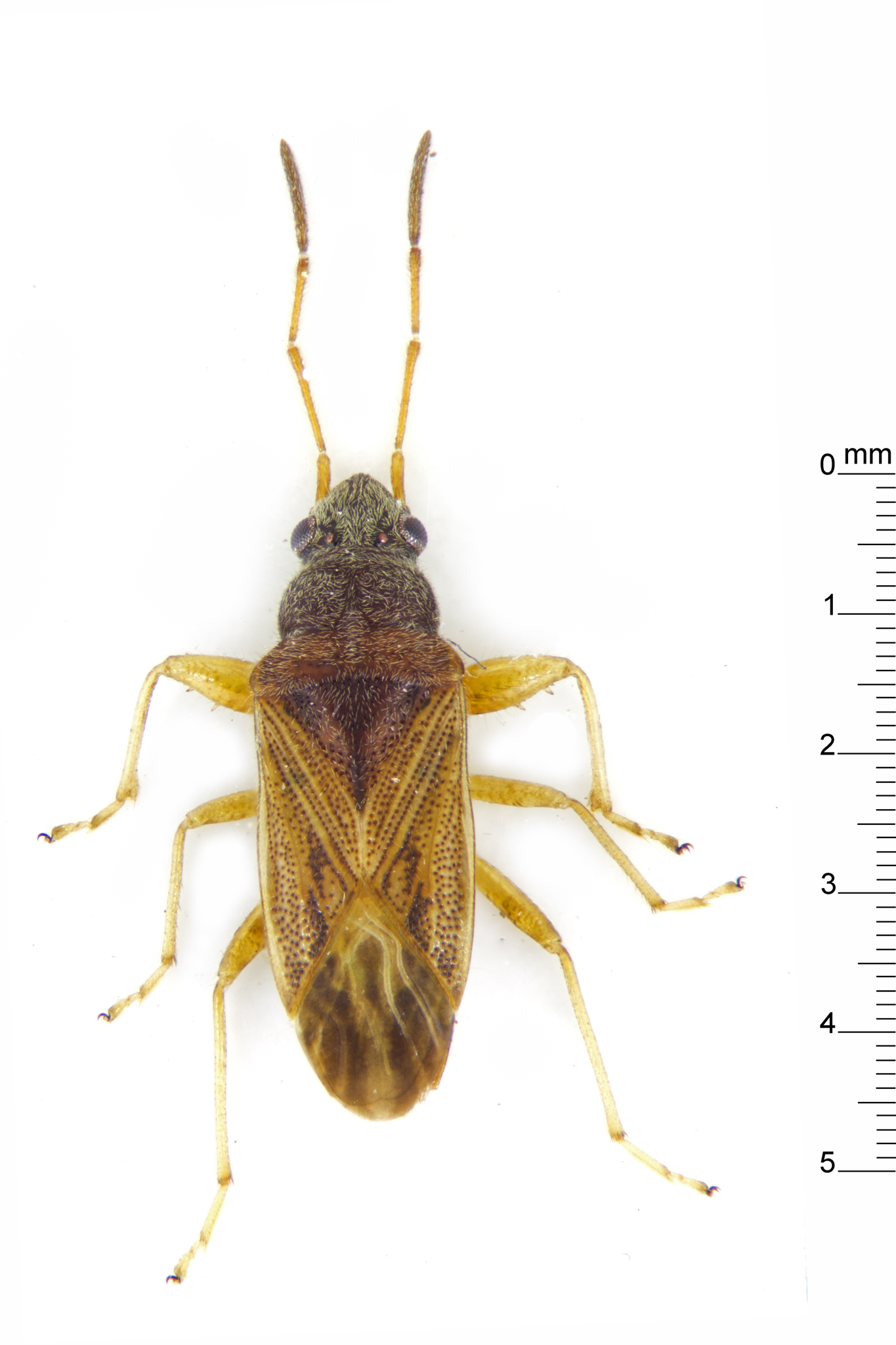
Remaudiereana puberula
