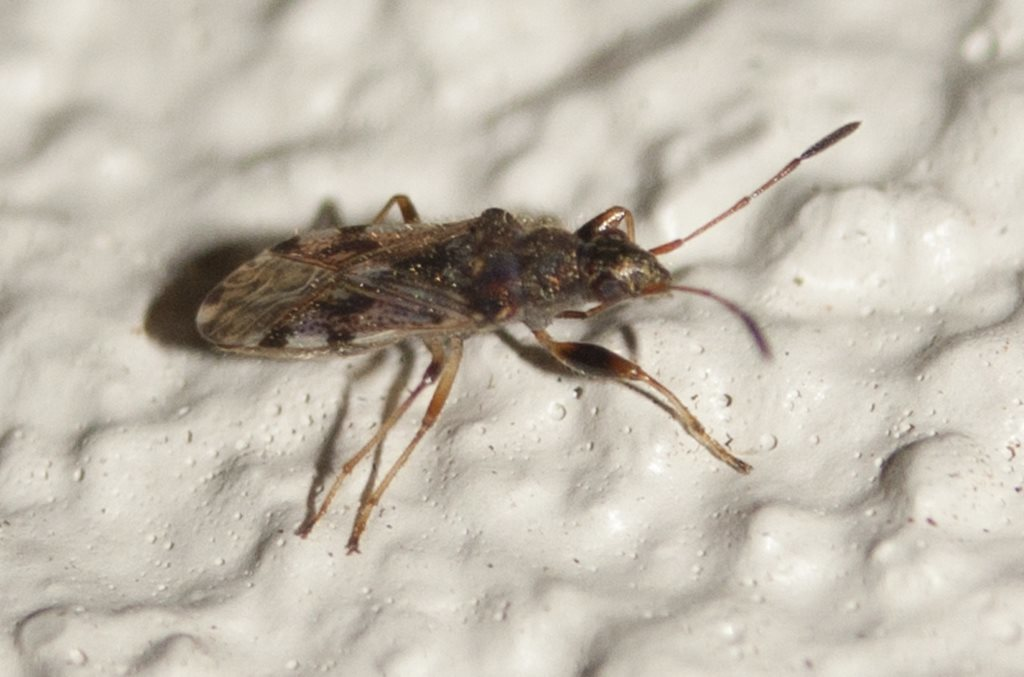

Scientific classification
- Kingdom: Animalia
- Phylum: Arthropoda
- Clade: Pancrustacea
- Class: Insecta
- Order: Hemiptera
- Suborder: Heteroptera
- Family: Rhyparochromidae
- Genus: Remaudiereana
- Species: R. inornata

Binomial name
- Remaudiereana inornata (Walker, 1872)

Synonyms
- Rhyparochromus inornatus; Plociomerus douglasi; Pachybrachius palauensis; Orthaea sidnica

= Remaudiereana inornata =

Species of bug

Remaudiereana inornata is a species of true bug in the family Rhyparochromidae. It is found across Australia, as well as in New Zealand. It is highly polyphagous.

== Description ==
Remaudiereana inornata has a black head; brown-yellow antennae; a dull, black scutum and scutellum; and largely yellow legs. The elytra of this species is yellowish, with alternating black-and-white patches along the edges.
