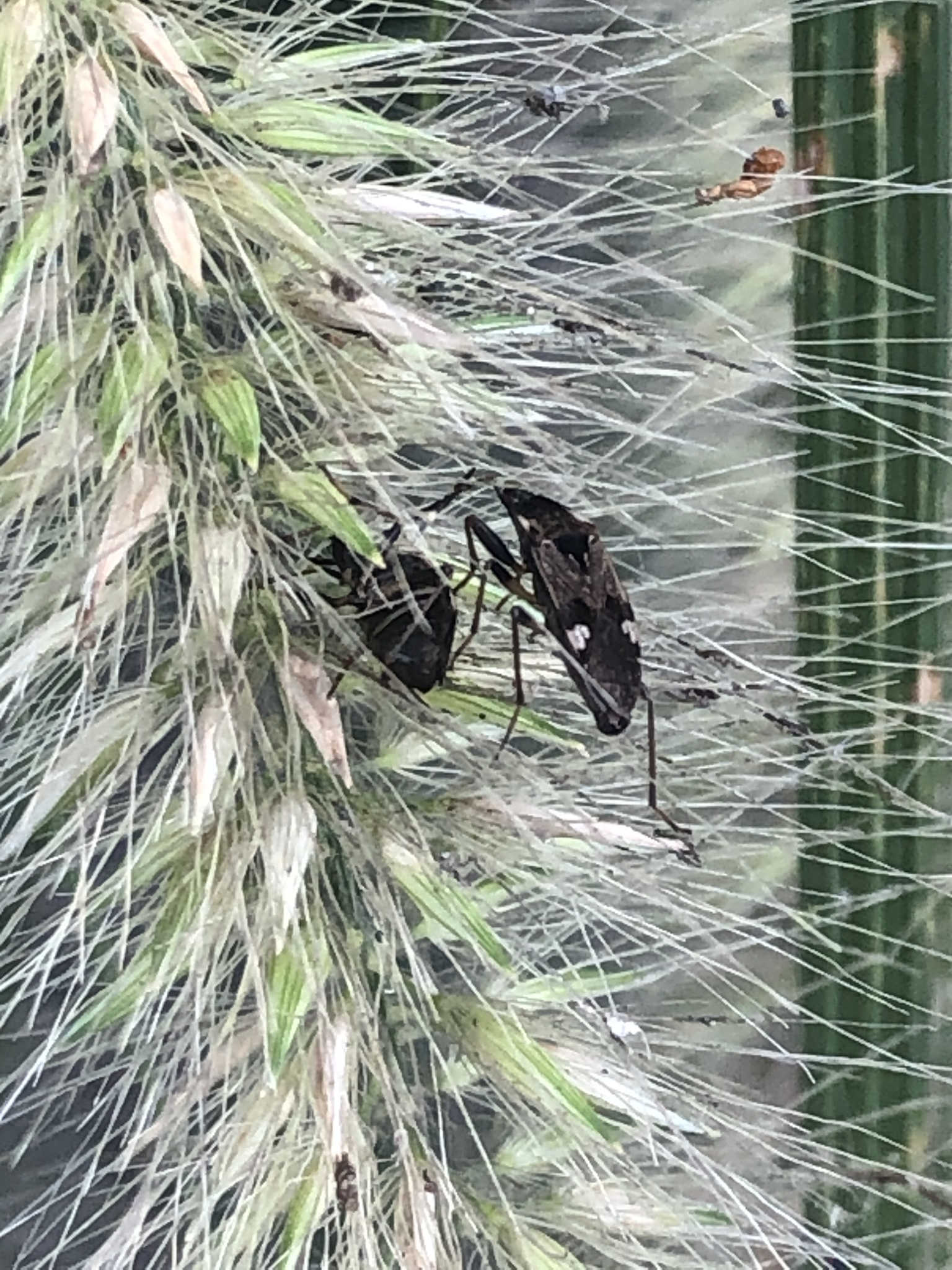
- Panaorus csikii, South Korea

Scientific classification
- Domain: Eukaryota
- Kingdom: Animalia
- Phylum: Arthropoda
- Class: Insecta
- Order: Hemiptera
- Suborder: Heteroptera
- Family: Rhyparochromidae
- Subfamily: Rhyparochrominae
- Tribe: Rhyparochromini
- Genus: Panaorus; Kiritshenko, 1951

= Panaorus =

Genus of insects

Panaorus is a genus of dirt-colored seed bugs in the family Rhyparochromidae. There are at least four described species in Panaorus, found in the Palearctic.

== Species ==
These four species belong to the genus Panaorus:

- Panaorus adspersus
- Panaorus albomaculatus
- Panaorus csikii
- Panaorus japonicus (Stål, 1874)
