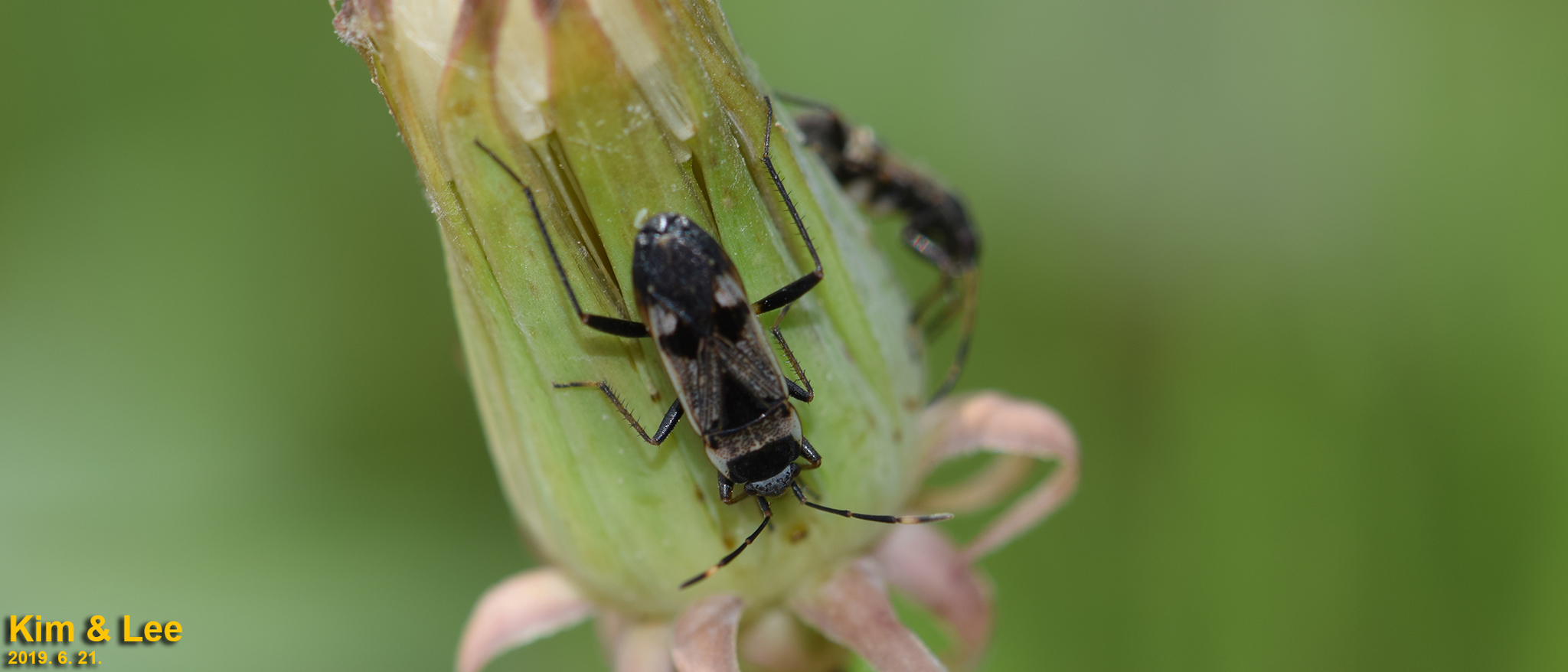
- Panaorus albomaculatus, South Korea

Scientific classification
- Domain: Eukaryota
- Kingdom: Animalia
- Phylum: Arthropoda
- Class: Insecta
- Order: Hemiptera
- Suborder: Heteroptera
- Family: Rhyparochromidae
- Genus: Panaorus
- Species: P. albomaculatus

Binomial name
- Panaorus albomaculatus (Scott, 1874)

= Panaorus albomaculatus =

Species of true bug

Panaorus albomaculatus is a species of dirt-colored seed bug in the family Rhyparochromidae, found in eastern Asia.
