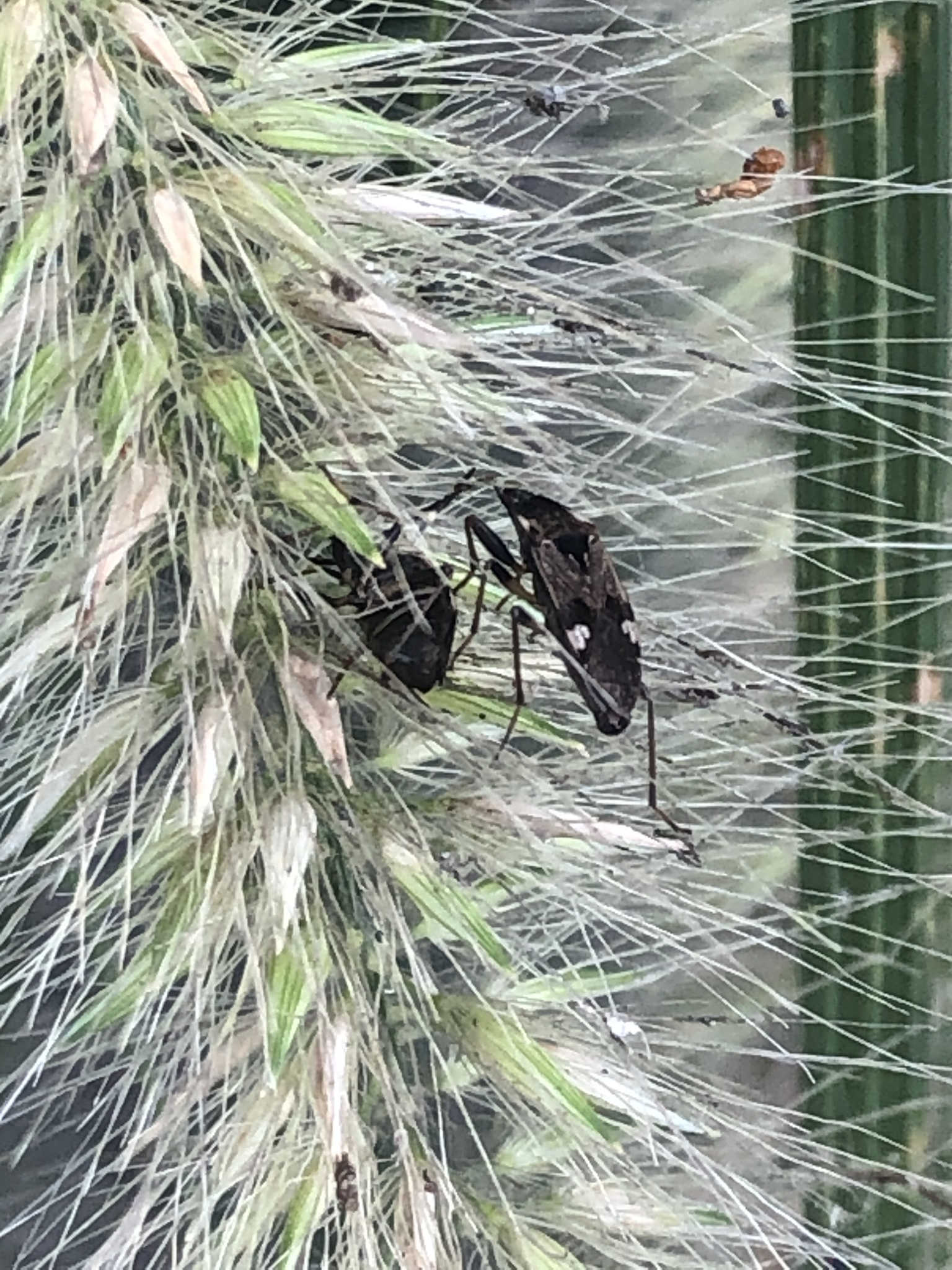
- Panaorus csikii, South Korea

Scientific classification
- Domain: Eukaryota
- Kingdom: Animalia
- Phylum: Arthropoda
- Class: Insecta
- Order: Hemiptera
- Suborder: Heteroptera
- Family: Rhyparochromidae
- Genus: Panaorus
- Species: P. csikii

Binomial name
- Panaorus csikii (Horvath, 1901)

= Panaorus csikii =

Species of true bug

Panaorus csikii is a species of dirt-colored seed bug in the family Rhyparochromidae found in eastern Asia.
