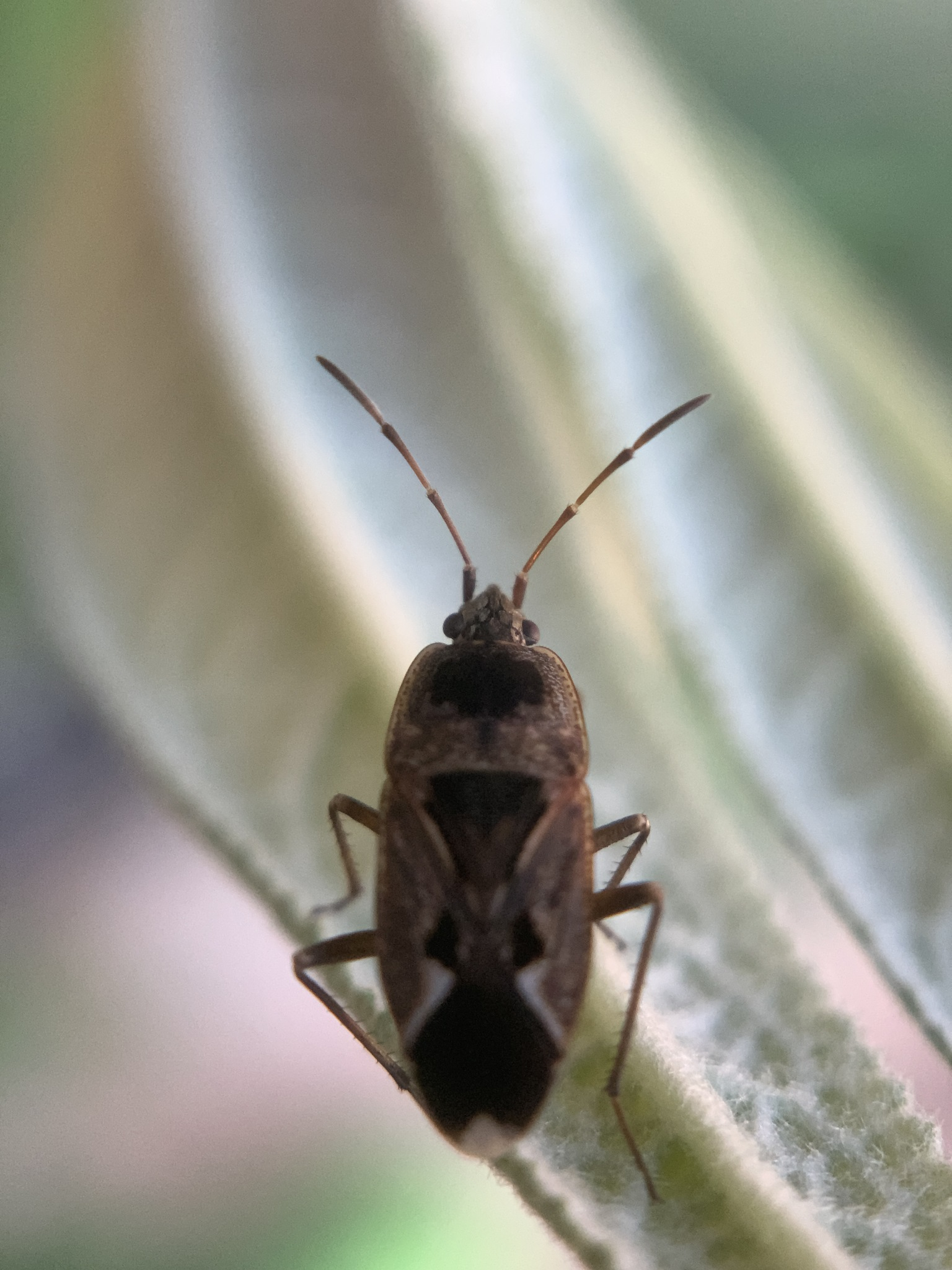
- Naphius apicalis, South Africa

Scientific classification
- Domain: Eukaryota
- Kingdom: Animalia
- Phylum: Arthropoda
- Class: Insecta
- Order: Hemiptera
- Suborder: Heteroptera
- Family: Rhyparochromidae
- Subfamily: Rhyparochrominae
- Tribe: Rhyparochromini
- Genus: Naphius
- Species: N. apicalis

Binomial name
- Naphius apicalis (Dallas, 1852)

= Naphius apicalis =

Species of true bug

Naphius apicalis is a species of dirt-colored seed bug in the family Rhyparochromidae, found in Africa and the Middle East.
