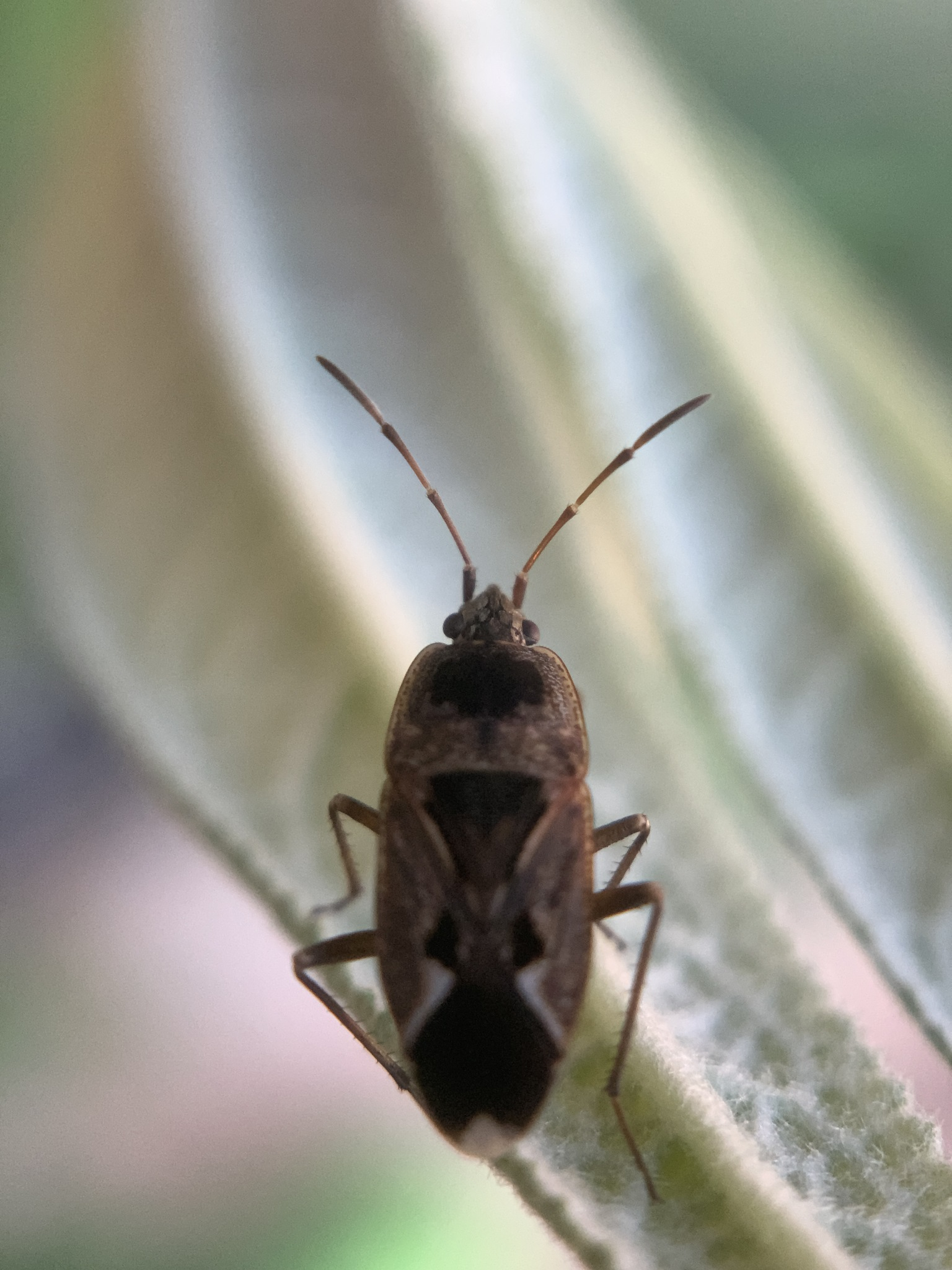
- Naphius apicalis, South Africa

Scientific classification
- Domain: Eukaryota
- Kingdom: Animalia
- Phylum: Arthropoda
- Class: Insecta
- Order: Hemiptera
- Suborder: Heteroptera
- Family: Rhyparochromidae
- Subfamily: Rhyparochrominae
- Tribe: Rhyparochromini
- Genus: Naphius; Stal, 1874

= Naphius =

Genus of insects

Naphius is a genus of dirt-colored seed bugs in the family Rhyparochromidae. There are about seven described species in Naphius.

== Species ==
These seven species belong to the genus Naphius:

- Naphius apicalis (Dallas, 1852)
- Naphius equatorius Scudder, 1969
- Naphius erosus (Distant, 1901)
- Naphius rossi Scudder, 1971
- Naphius schultzei (Breddin, 1913)
- Naphius scorteccii (Mancini, 1964)
- Naphius zavattarii (Mancini, 1948)
