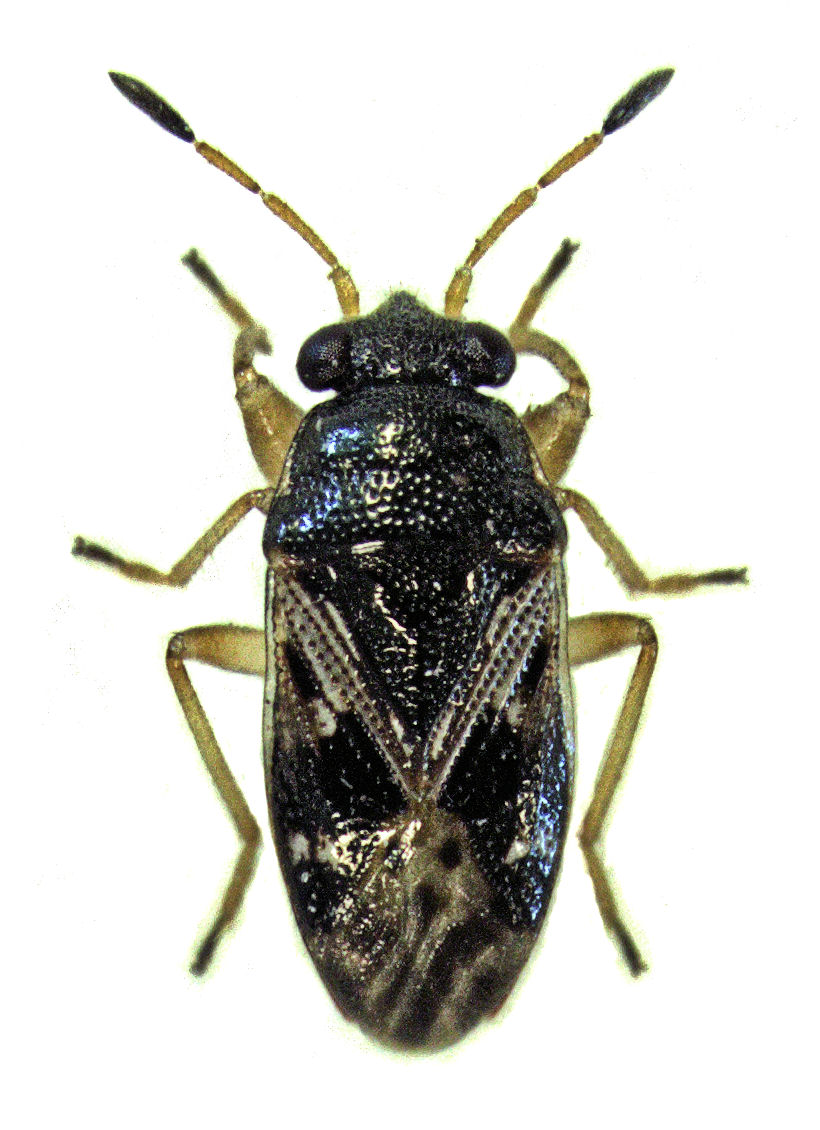
- Stizocephalus brevirostris

Scientific classification
- Domain: Eukaryota
- Kingdom: Animalia
- Phylum: Arthropoda
- Class: Insecta
- Order: Hemiptera
- Suborder: Heteroptera
- Family: Rhyparochromidae
- Subfamily: Rhyparochrominae
- Tribe: Rhyparochromini
- Genus: Stizocephalus; Eyles, 1970

= Stizocephalus =

Genus of insects

Stizocephalus is a genus of dirt-colored seed bugs in the family Rhyparochromidae. There are about seven described species in Stizocephalus.

== Species ==
These seven species belong to the genus Stizocephalus:

- Stizocephalus atratus Scudder, 1975
- Stizocephalus brevirostris Eyles, 1970
- Stizocephalus explanatus Scudder, 1975
- Stizocephalus fuscus Scudder, 1975
- Stizocephalus hirsutus Scudder, 1975
- Stizocephalus pilosus Scudder, 1975
- Stizocephalus tuberculatus Scudder, 1975
