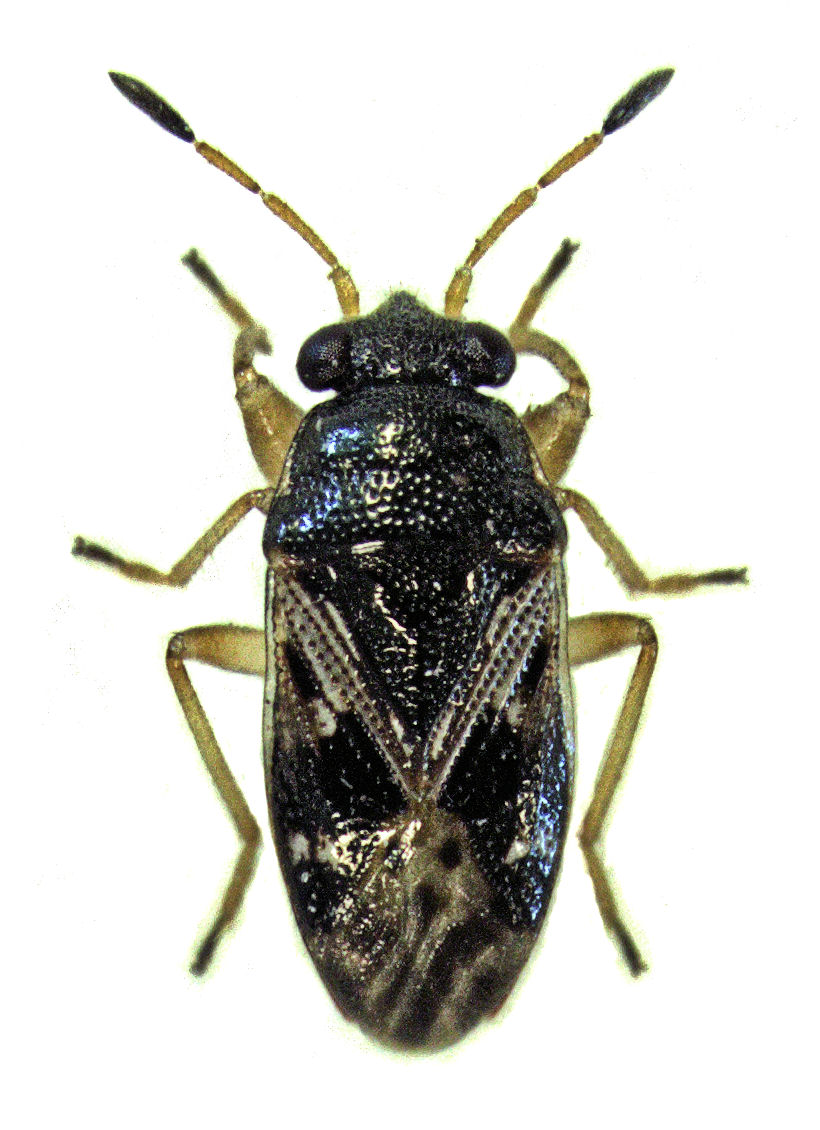
- Stizocephalus brevirostris, New Zealand

Scientific classification
- Kingdom: Animalia
- Phylum: Arthropoda
- Clade: Pancrustacea
- Class: Insecta
- Order: Hemiptera
- Suborder: Heteroptera
- Family: Rhyparochromidae
- Subfamily: Rhyparochrominae
- Tribe: Rhyparochromini
- Genus: Stizocephalus
- Species: S. brevirostris

Binomial name
- Stizocephalus brevirostris Eyles, 1970

= Stizocephalus brevirostris =

Species of dirt-colored seed bug

Stizocephalus brevirostris is a species of dirt-colored seed bug in the family Rhyparochromidae, found in New Zealand.
