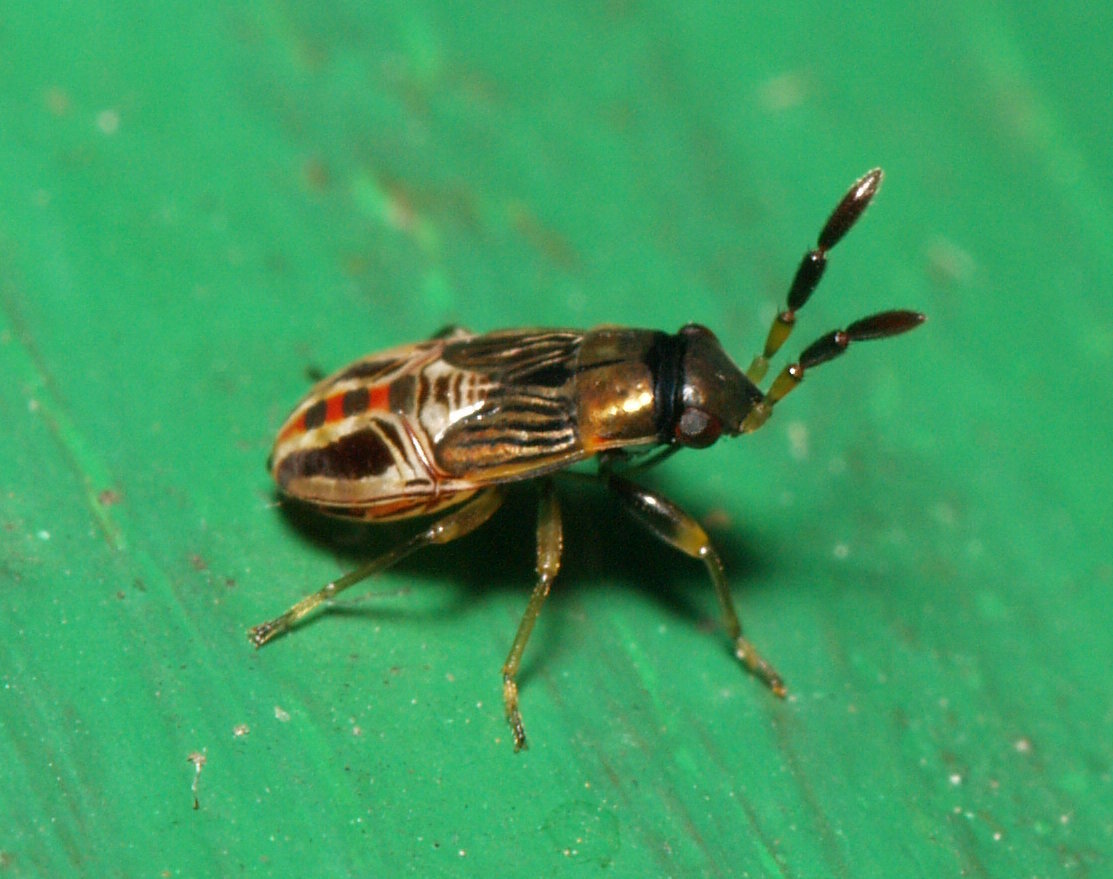
- Appolonius crassus, Hong Kong

Scientific classification
- Domain: Eukaryota
- Kingdom: Animalia
- Phylum: Arthropoda
- Class: Insecta
- Order: Hemiptera
- Suborder: Heteroptera
- Family: Rhyparochromidae
- Subfamily: Rhyparochrominae
- Tribe: Drymini
- Genus: Appolonius
- Species: A. crassus

Binomial name
- Appolonius crassus (Distant, 1906)

= Appolonius crassus =

Species of dirt-colored seed bug

Appolonius crassus is a species of dirt-colored seed bug in the family Rhyparochromidae, found in southern and eastern Asia.

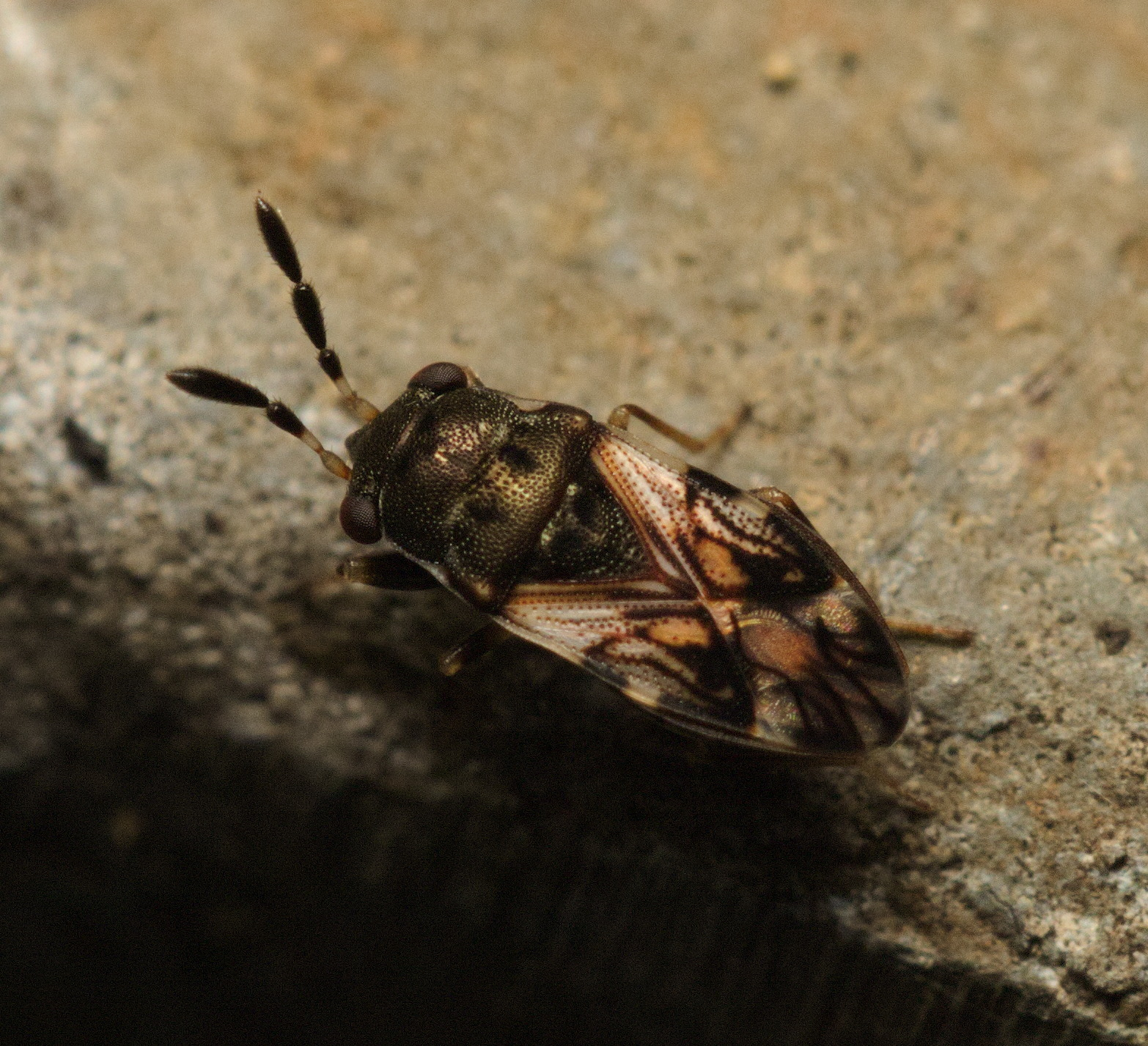
Appolonius crassus, Hong Kong
