= Malezonotus sodalicius =

Scientific classification
- Domain: Eukaryota
- Kingdom: Animalia
- Phylum: Arthropoda
- Class: Insecta
- Order: Hemiptera
- Suborder: Heteroptera
- Family: Rhyparochromidae
- Tribe: Gonianotini
- Genus: Malezonotus
- Species: M. sodalicius

Binomial name
- Malezonotus sodalicius (Uhler, 1876)

Species of true bug

Malezonotus sodalicius is a species of dirt-colored seed bug in the family Rhyparochromidae. It is found in North America.
