= Malezonotus =

Scientific classification
- Domain: Eukaryota
- Kingdom: Animalia
- Phylum: Arthropoda
- Class: Insecta
- Order: Hemiptera
- Suborder: Heteroptera
- Family: Rhyparochromidae
- Subfamily: Rhyparochrominae
- Tribe: Gonianotini
- Genus: Malezonotus; Barber, 1918

Genus of true bugs

Malezonotus is a genus of dirt-colored seed bugs in the family Rhyparochromidae. There are about nine described species in Malezonotus.

== Species ==
These nine species belong to the genus Malezonotus:

- Malezonotus angustatus (Van Duzee, 1910)
- Malezonotus arcuatus Ashlock, 1958
- Malezonotus barberi Ashlock, 1958
- Malezonotus fuscosus Barber, 1918
- Malezonotus grossus Van Duzee, 1935
- Malezonotus mayorgae Brailovsky & Cervantes, 1989
- Malezonotus obrieni Ashlock, 1963
- Malezonotus rufipes (Stal, 1874)
- Malezonotus sodalicius (Uhler, 1876)
