= Malezonotus rufipes =

Scientific classification
- Kingdom: Animalia
- Phylum: Arthropoda
- Clade: Pancrustacea
- Class: Insecta
- Order: Hemiptera
- Suborder: Heteroptera
- Family: Rhyparochromidae
- Tribe: Gonianotini
- Genus: Malezonotus
- Species: M. rufipes

Binomial name
- Malezonotus rufipes (Stal, 1874)

Synonyms
- Trapezonotus rufipes Stål, 1874

Species of true bug

Malezonotus rufipes is a species of dirt-colored seed bug in the family Rhyparochromidae. It is found in North America.
