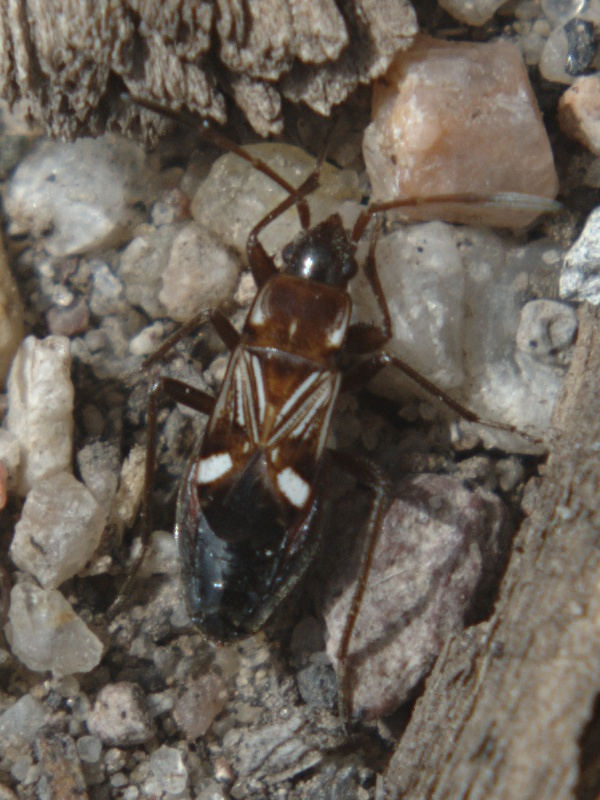
- Uhleriola floralis

Scientific classification
- Domain: Eukaryota
- Kingdom: Animalia
- Phylum: Arthropoda
- Class: Insecta
- Order: Hemiptera
- Suborder: Heteroptera
- Family: Rhyparochromidae
- Tribe: Rhyparochromini
- Genus: Uhleriola; Horvath, 1908
- Species: U. floralis

Binomial name
- Uhleriola floralis (Gillette & Baker, 1895)

= Uhleriola =

Genus of true bugs

Uhleriola is a genus of dirt-colored seed bugs in the family Rhyparochromidae. There is one described species in Uhleriola, U. floralis.
