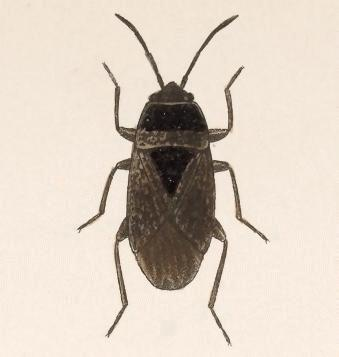

Scientific classification
- Domain: Eukaryota
- Kingdom: Animalia
- Phylum: Arthropoda
- Class: Insecta
- Order: Hemiptera
- Suborder: Heteroptera
- Family: Rhyparochromidae
- Subfamily: Rhyparochrominae
- Tribe: Gonianotini
- Genus: Delochilocoris; Bergroth, 1893

= Delochilocoris =

Genus of true bugs

Delochilocoris is a genus of dirt-colored seed bugs in the family Rhyparochromidae. There are at least three described species in Delochilocoris.

== Species ==
These three species belong to the genus Delochilocoris:

- Delochilocoris caliginosus (Distant, 1893)
- Delochilocoris gracilis Scudder, 2008
- Delochilocoris illuminatus (Distant, 1893)
