= Delochilocoris caliginosus =

Scientific classification
- Domain: Eukaryota
- Kingdom: Animalia
- Phylum: Arthropoda
- Class: Insecta
- Order: Hemiptera
- Suborder: Heteroptera
- Family: Rhyparochromidae
- Genus: Delochilocoris
- Species: D. caliginosus

Binomial name
- Delochilocoris caliginosus (Distant, 1882)

Species of true bug

Delochilocoris caliginosus is a species of dirt-colored seed bug in the family Rhyparochromidae. It is found in Central America and North America.
