= Lenaeus =

Lenaeus (Ancient Greek: Ληναιος, Lēnaios) is a masculine given name related to wine presses and the Maenads, the female attendants of Dionysus and Bacchus in Greco-Roman mythology.

It may refer to:

- Johannes Canuti Lenaeus (1573–1669), a Swedish academic and archbishop
- Lenaeus (fl. 2nd cent. BC), a Greek slave of the Ptolemaic queen Cleopatra the Syrian who served as regent of Egypt
- Pompeius Lenaeus (fl. 1st cent. BC), a Greek slave of the Roman general Pompey who was freed and began a school in Rome

It is also used in various scientific names:

- Lenaeus (bug), a genus of assassin bugs
- Episcepsis lenaeus, a Central American moth
- Papilio menatius lenaeus, a South American butterfly
- H. lenaeus, a South American butterfly of the genus Heliconius
- S. lenaeus, a beetle of the genus Scaraphites

== See also ==
- Lenaia
