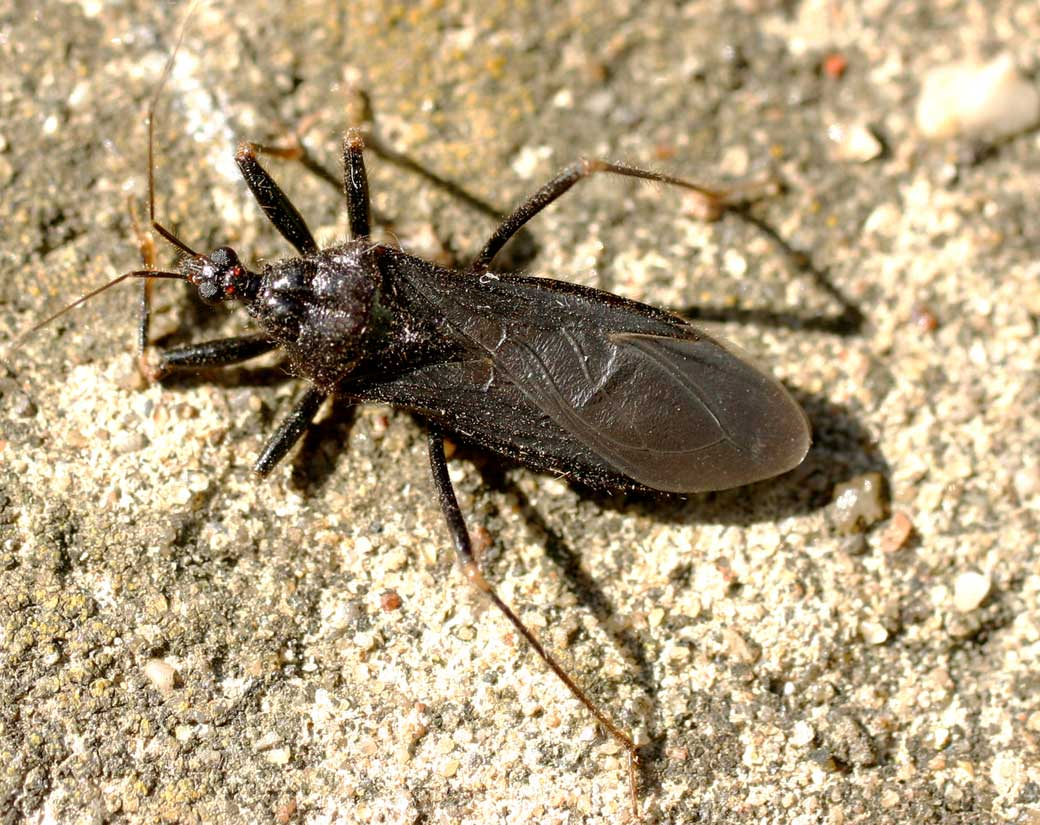
- Reduvius personatus

Scientific classification
- Kingdom: Animalia
- Phylum: Arthropoda
- Class: Insecta
- Order: Hemiptera
- Suborder: Heteroptera
- Family: Reduviidae
- Subfamily: Reduviinae; Latreille, 1807

= Reduviinae =

Subfamily of true bugs

The Reduviinae are a subfamily of the reduviid assassin bugs. Many members of the subfamily are nocturnal and their lifecycles are generally poorly known. This subfamily is suspected not to be monophyletic.

== Genera ==
- Acanthaspis Amyot and Serville, 1843
- Alloeocranum Reuter, 1881
- Durevius Villiers, 1962
- Durganda Amyot and Serville, 1843
- Durgandana Miller, 1957
- Ectrichodiella Fracker & Bruner, 1924
- Edocla Stål, 1857
- Empyrocoris Miller, 1953
- Ganesocoris Miller, 1955
- Gerbelius Distant, 1930
- Hadrokerala Wygodzinsky & Lent, 1980
- Holotrichius Burmeister, 1835
- Isdegardes Distant, 1909
- Lenaeus Stål, 1859
- Mesancanthapsis Livingstone & Murugan, 1993
- Neocanthapsis Livingstone & Murugan, 1991
- Neotiarodes Miller, 1957
- Paralenaeus Reuter, 1881
- Pasira Stål, 1859
- Pasiropsis Reuter, 1881
- Platymeris Laporte in Guérin, 1833
- Psyttala Stål, 1859
- Psophis Stål, 1863
- Platymeris Laporte, 1833
- Pseudozelurus Lent & Wygodzinsky, 1947
- Ripurocoris Miller, 1959
- Reduvius Fabricius, 1775
- Tapeinus Laporte, 1833
- Tiarodes Burmeister, 1875
- Tiarodurganda Breddin, 1903
- Velitra Stål, 1866
- Zeluroides Lent & Wygodzinsky, 1948
- Zelurus Hahn
