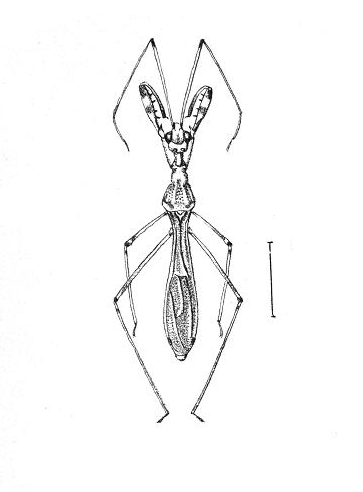
- Bactrodes spinulosus Stål, 1862

Scientific classification
- Kingdom: Animalia
- Phylum: Arthropoda
- Class: Insecta
- Order: Hemiptera
- Suborder: Heteroptera
- Family: Reduviidae
- Subfamily: Bactrodinae
- Genus: Bactrodes; Stål, 1860

Type species
- Zelus femoratus Fabricius, 1803

= Bactrodes =

Genus of true bugs

Bactrodes is a genus of reduviids (assassin bugs). All known species are from South America.

== Species ==
- Bactrodes biannulatus Stål, 1862
- Bactrodes femoratus (Fabricius, 1803)
- Bactrodes misionensis Coscarón & Melo, 2003
- Bactrodes multiannulatus Berg, 1884
- Bactrodes spinulosus Stål, 1862
