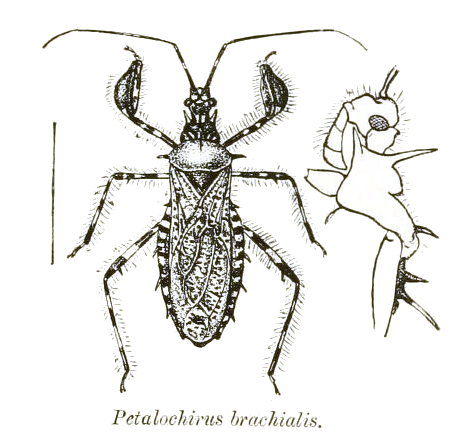
- Petalocheirus brachialis

Scientific classification
- Kingdom: Animalia
- Phylum: Arthropoda
- Clade: Pancrustacea
- Class: Insecta
- Order: Hemiptera
- Suborder: Heteroptera
- Family: Reduviidae
- Subfamily: Salyavatinae
- Genus: Petalocheirus; Palisot de Beauvois, 1805

Type species
- Petalocheirus variegatus Palisot de Beauvois, 1805.

= Petalocheirus =

Genus of true bugs

Petalocheirus is a genus of assassin bugs in the subfamily Salyavatinae. Species in the genus have a leaf-like broadening of the foretibia, and many species are known to be predators of termites. The genus is distributed in the tropics of Africa and Asia and species in apparently closely related genera such as Platychira may need further examination.

The spelling of the genus was incorrectly emended by Burmeister in 1835 as Petalochirus. The genus Platychira was briefly considered as a synonym.

Species in the genus include:

- Petalocheirus bergrothi Schouteden, 1931
- Petalocheirus brachialis Stål, 1858
- Petalocheirus burmanus Distant, 1903
- Petalocheirus gazella Costa, 1864
- Petalocheirus indicus Reuter, 1887
- Petalocheirus inimicus Miller, 1950
- Petalocheirus malayus Stål, 1859
- Petalocheirus perakensis Distant, 1903
- Petalocheirus pugil Bergroth, 1912
- Petalocheirus rapinator Miller, 1950
- Petalocheirus rubiginosus Palisot de Beauvois, 1805
- Petalocheirus schoutedeni Villiers, 1943
- Petalocheirus schroederi Miller, 1954
- Petalocheirus sedulus Miller, 1950
- Petalocheirus variegatus (Palisot de Beauvois, 1805)
- Petalocheirus villiersi Miller, 1950
- Petalocheirus vittiventris Bergroth, 1903
