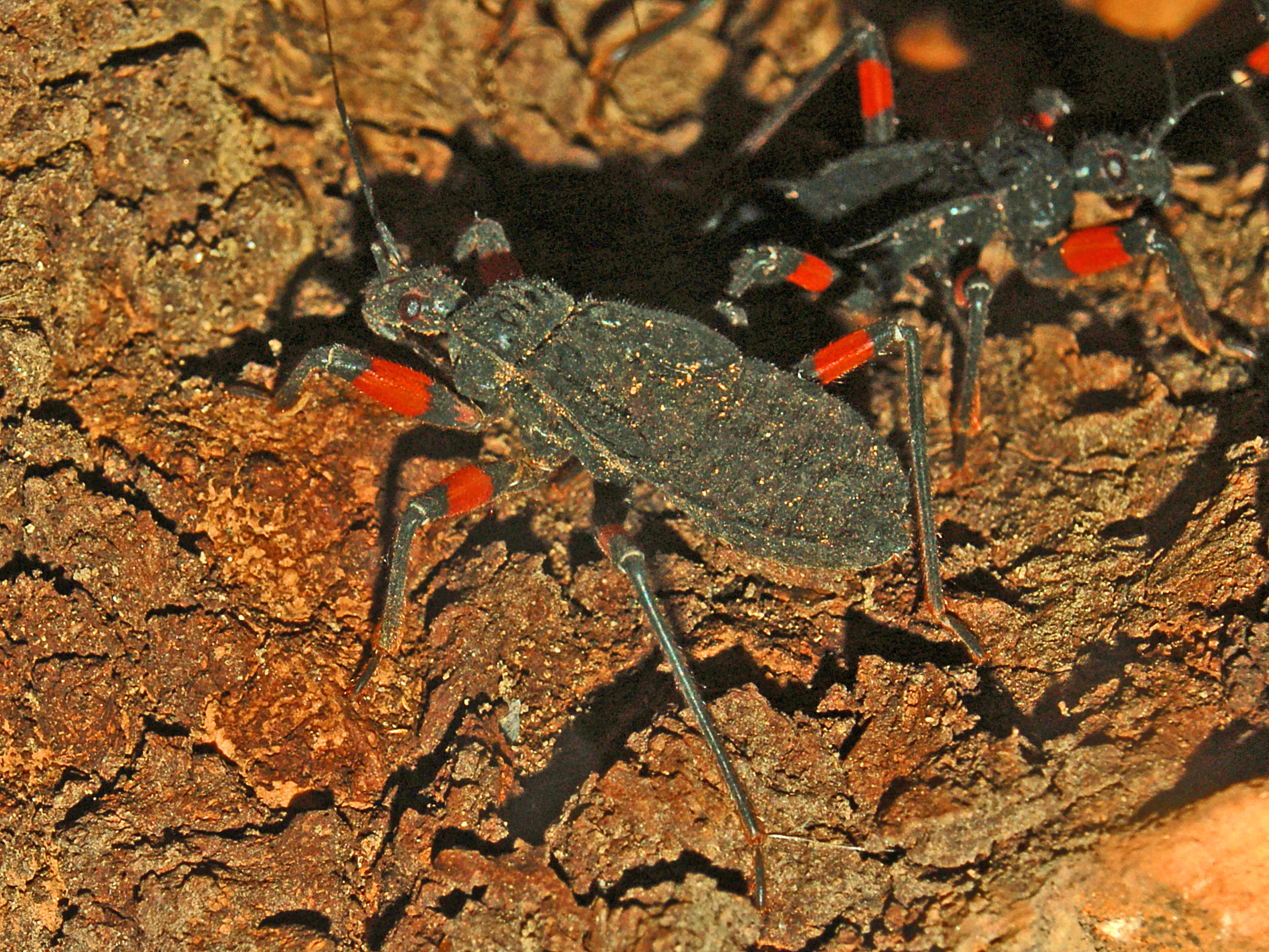

Scientific classification
- Kingdom: Animalia
- Phylum: Arthropoda
- Class: Insecta
- Order: Hemiptera
- Suborder: Heteroptera
- Family: Reduviidae
- Genus: Platymeris
- Species: P. rhadamanthus

Binomial name
- Platymeris rhadamanthus Gerstaecker, 1873

= Platymeris rhadamanthus =

Species of true bug

Platymeris rhadamanthus (also known as the red spot assassin bug) is a species of true bugs belonging to the family Reduviidae.

== Description ==
Platymeris rhadamanthus can reach a length of 3.8–4 centimetres (1.5–1.6 in). The basic color of the body is black, with orange or red spots on the hemelytra. The legs are covered with short hair, and femurs are crossed by a red band. Both the orange-spot and red-spot color forms have the same morphological characters including the morphology of male and female genitalia. This venomous nocturnal predator has needle-like mouth parts designed for sucking juices out other insects. It has a painful sting, comparable to that of a hornet. It feeds on small invertebrates, but mainly on the rhinoceros beetles.

Historically, the orange color form has also been known as Platymeris sp. "Mombo" in the pet trade, however it is now known to be a color form of P. rhadamanthus.

== Distribution and habitat ==
This species can be found in Angola, Burundi, Democratic Republic of the Congo, Gabon, Kenya, Malawi, Mozambique, Republic of South Africa, Tanzania, Zambia and Zanzibar. It prefers open areas with small participation of tree vegetation.
