= Ganesocoris =

Scientific classification
- Kingdom: Animalia
- Phylum: Arthropoda
- Class: Insecta
- Order: Hemiptera
- Suborder: Heteroptera
- Family: Reduviidae
- Subfamily: Reduviinae
- Genus: Ganesocoris; Miller, 1955

Genus of true bugs

Ganesocoris is a genus of assassin bugs.

== Partial list of species ==
- Ganesocoris angiportus (Distant, 1903)
- Ganesocoris serratus Miller, 1955
