= Holotrichius innesi =

Scientific classification
- Kingdom: Animalia
- Phylum: Arthropoda
- Class: Insecta
- Order: Hemiptera
- Suborder: Heteroptera
- Family: Reduviidae
- Genus: Holotrichius
- Species: H. innesi

Binomial name
- Holotrichius innesi Horvath, 1909

Species of true bug

Holotrichius innesi (known as the afrur in part of its range) is an assassin bug found in some Middle Eastern countries. When touched, this insect emits a varying number of stridulating noises in double pulses.

In the deserts of Israel the afrur ("dirt" in colloquial Hebrew, from its habit of covering itself with dirt) is believed to have a powerful venom, and that it is possibly to blame for deaths attributed to snake and scorpion envenomation. However, no deaths have been formally attributed to it.

== Subspecies ==
- H. i innesi
- H. i. rugicollis
