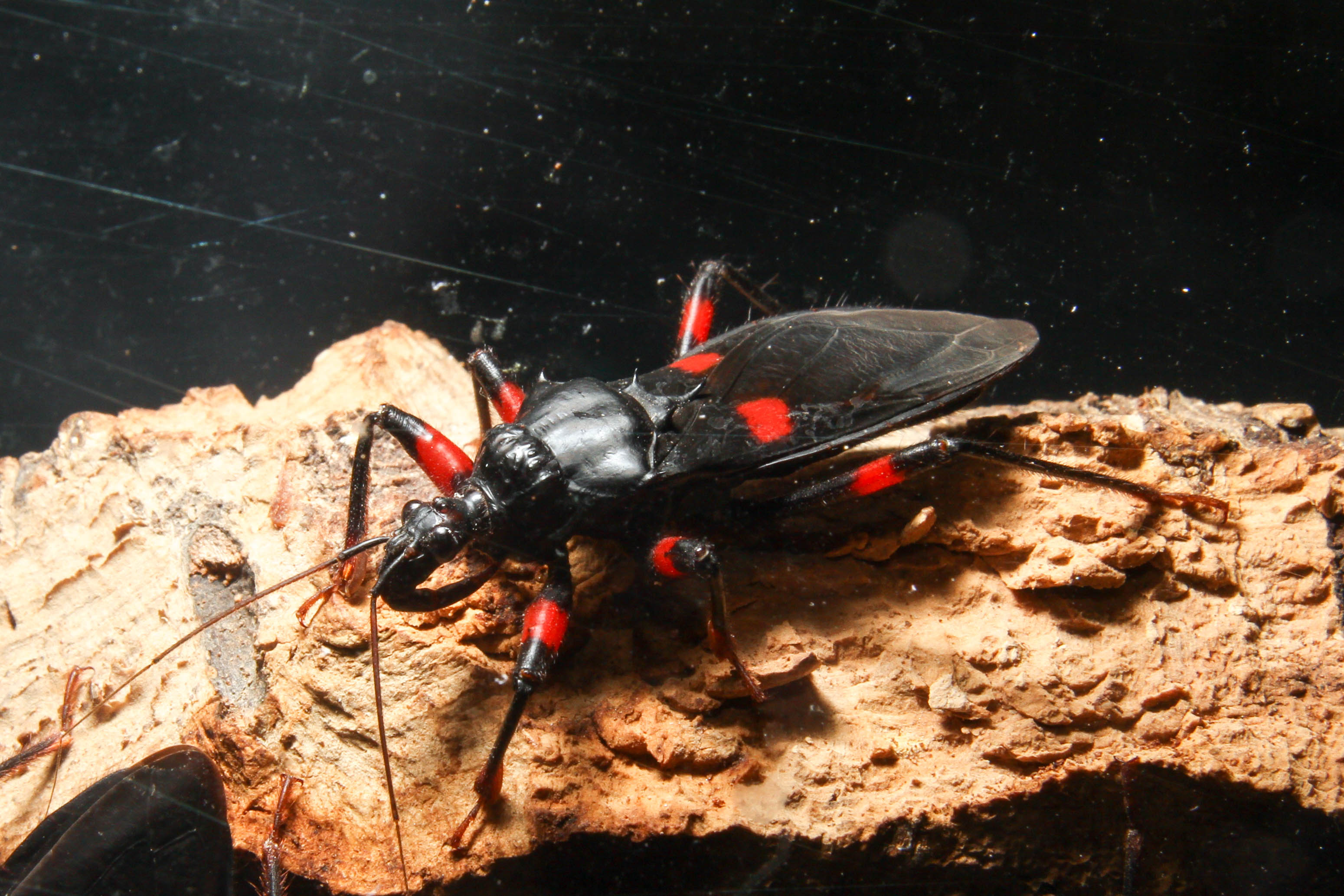

Scientific classification
- Kingdom: Animalia
- Phylum: Arthropoda
- Class: Insecta
- Order: Hemiptera
- Suborder: Heteroptera
- Family: Reduviidae
- Genus: Platymeris
- Species: P. laevicollis

Binomial name
- Platymeris laevicollis Distant, 1919

= Platymeris laevicollis =

Species of true bug

Platymeris laevicollis is a venomous predatory true bug from central Africa that can be found in forests, scrublands, grasslands, and croplands. They are efficient predators and are used by farmers on coconut plantations to control herbivorous pests such as the rhinoceros beetle. As a true bug of the order Hemiptera, it has needle-like mouth parts designed for sucking juices out of plants or other insects instead of chewing. P. laevicollis has sharp stylets in its proboscis or rostrum used to pierce the exoskeleton of its prey. Saliva is then injected into the prey which liquifies its tissues, and the rostrum is then used to suck out the digested fluids. If disturbed, it is capable of a defensive bite considered to be more painful than a bee sting.

The insect is also known as the red-eyed assassin bug.
