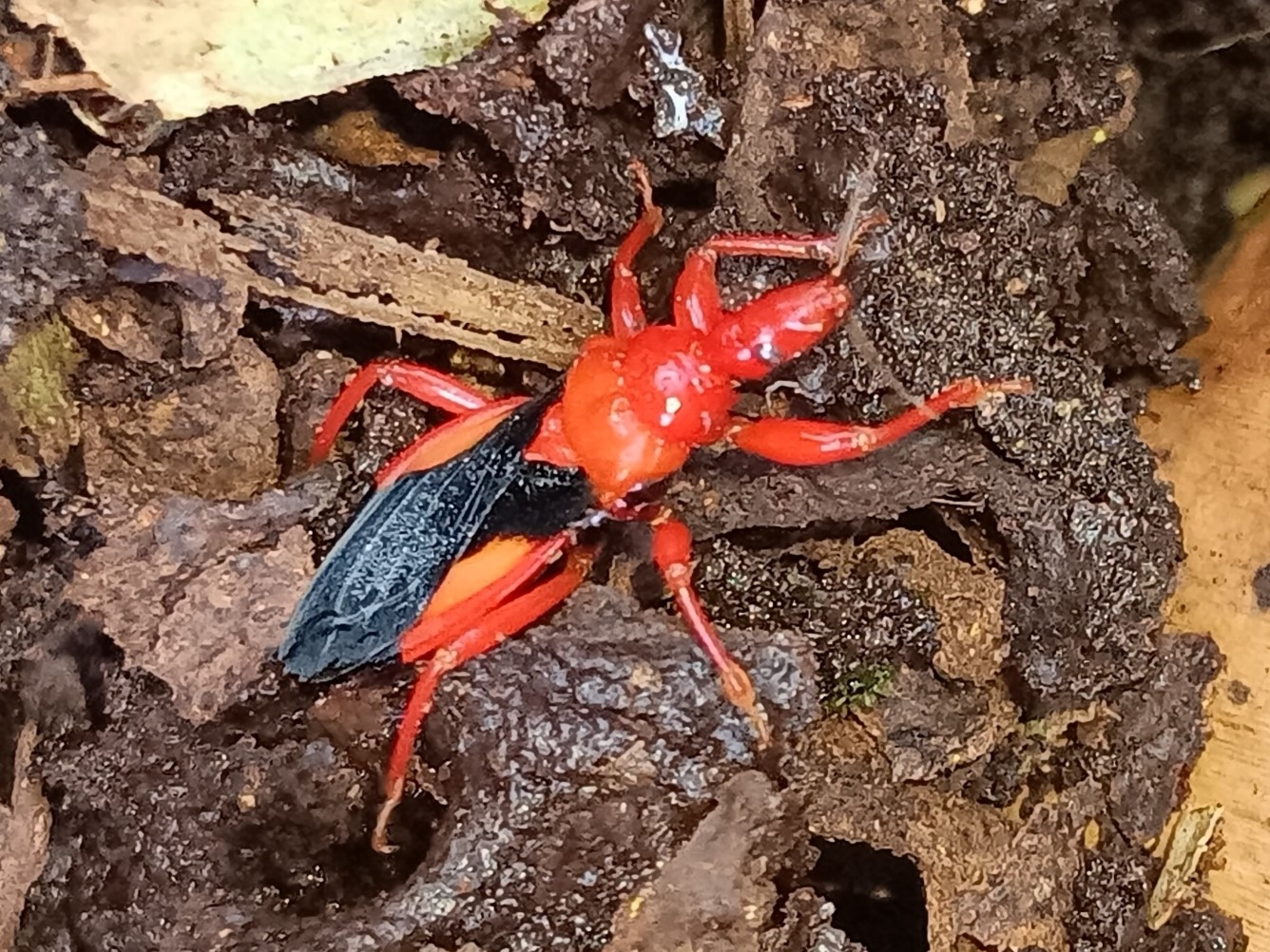
- Tiarodes cruentus

Scientific classification
- Domain: Eukaryota
- Kingdom: Animalia
- Phylum: Arthropoda
- Class: Insecta
- Order: Hemiptera
- Suborder: Heteroptera
- Family: Reduviidae
- Subfamily: Reduviinae
- Genus: Tiarodes; Burmeister, 1835

Type species
- Cimbus versicolor Laporte, 1833

= Tiarodes =

Genus of true bugs

Tiarodes is a genus of assassin bugs. Eighty-five species are known.

== Selected species ==
- Tiarodes acutangulus Miller, 1959
- Tiarodes ambulator Miller, 1959
- Tiarodes obyanus Distant, 1902
- Tiarodes pictus Cai & Tomokuni, 2001
- Tiarodes rufithorax Reuter, 1881
- Tiarodes salvazai Miller, 1959
- Tiarodes varicolor Stål, 1863
- Tiarodes venenatus Cai & Sun, 2001
- Tiarodes versicolor (Laporte, 1833)
- Tiarodes vexillarius Miller, 1959
- Tiarodes vilis Miller, 1959
- Tiarodes vorax Miller, 1940
- Tiarodes waterstradti Breddin, 1903
- Tiarodes xantusi Reuter, 1881
