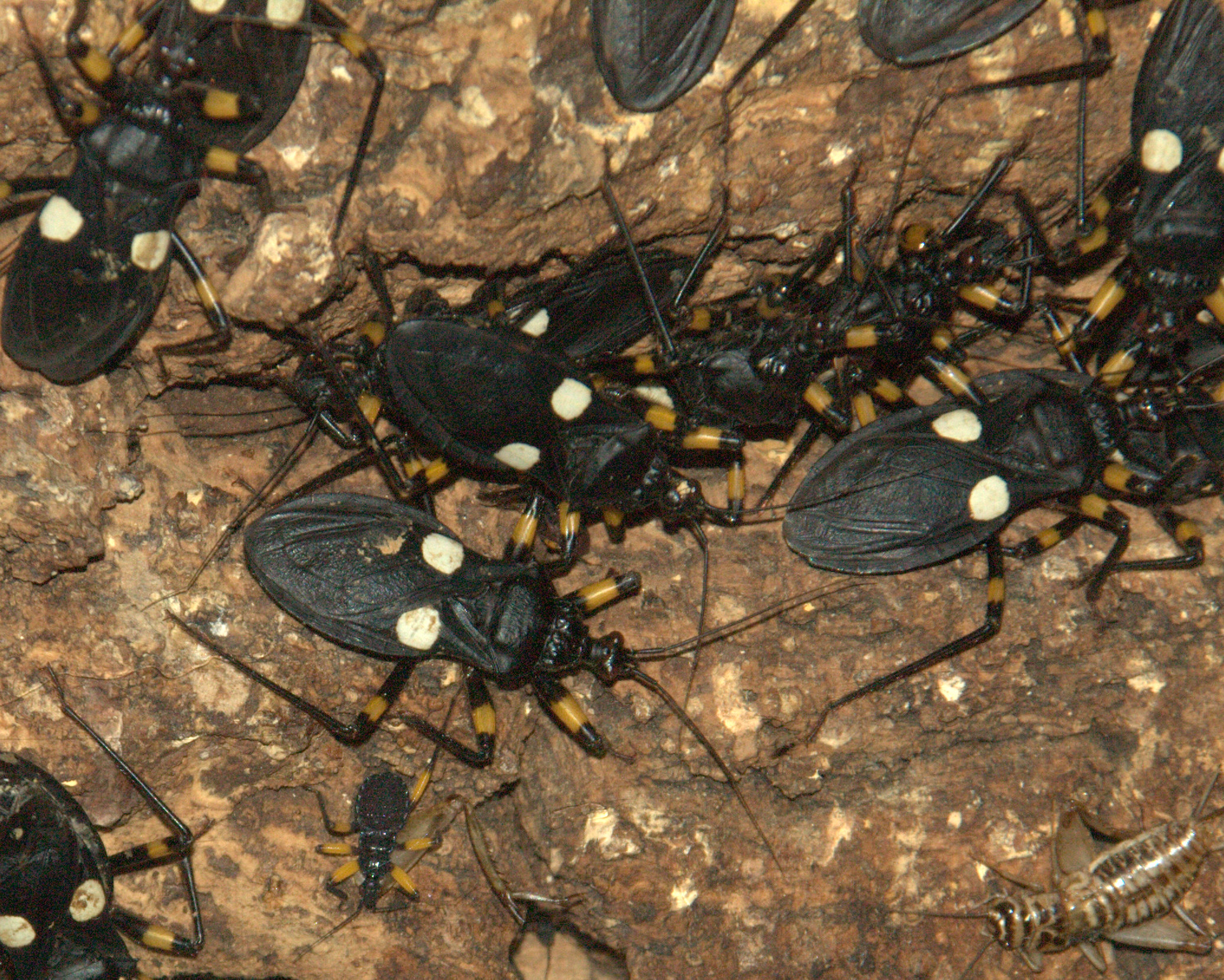
- Dorsal view showing white spots
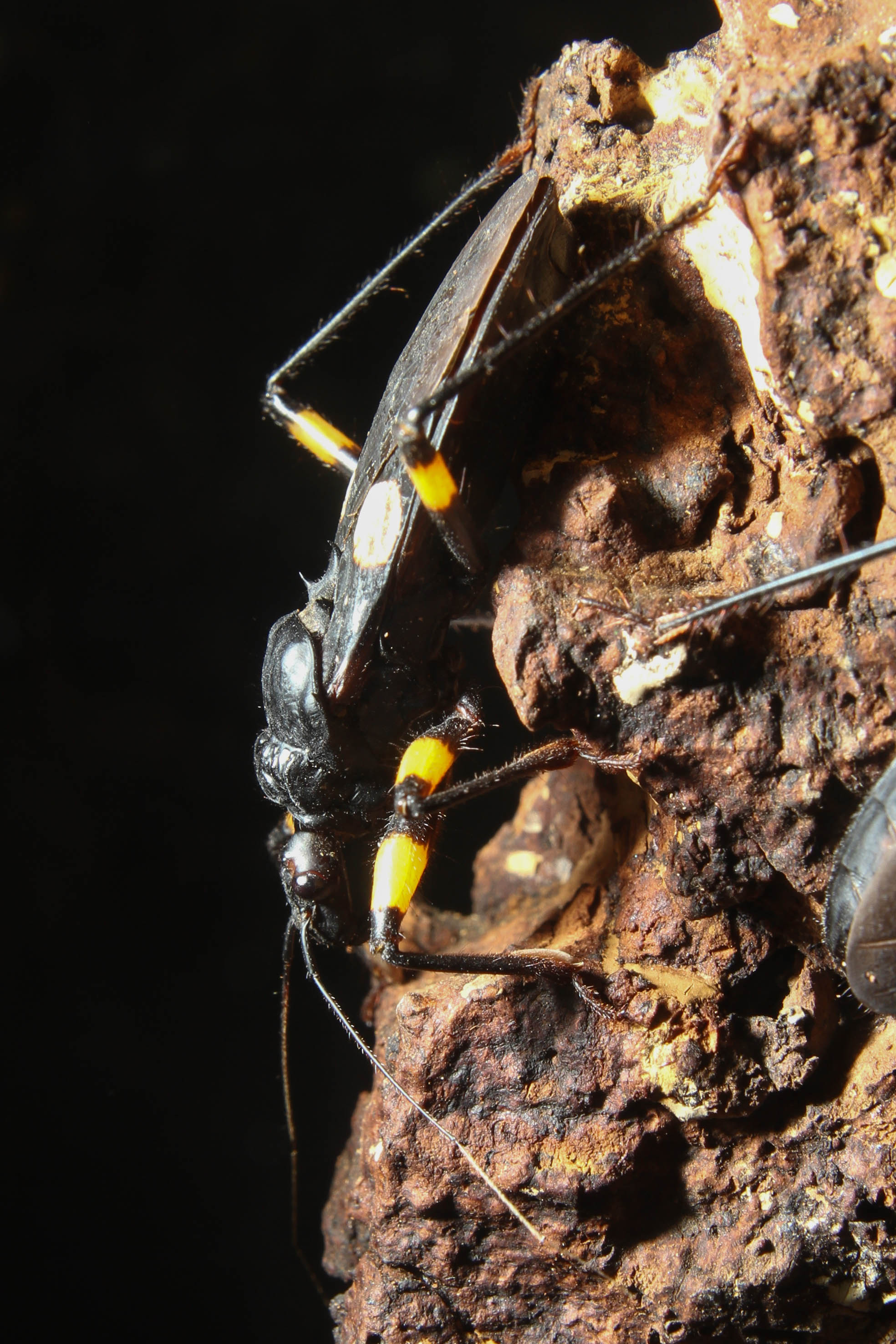
- Detail of side view

Scientific classification
- Kingdom: Animalia
- Phylum: Arthropoda
- Class: Insecta
- Order: Hemiptera
- Suborder: Heteroptera
- Family: Reduviidae
- Genus: Platymeris
- Species: P. biguttatus

Binomial name
- Platymeris biguttatus (Linnaeus, 1767)

= Platymeris biguttatus =

Species of true bug

Platymeris biguttatus, the two-spotted assassin bug, is a venomous predatory true bug of west and southwest African origin ranging in size from 10–40 mm. As a true bug of the order hemiptera, it has needle like mouth parts designed for sucking juices out of plants or other insects instead of chewing. P. biguttatus has sharp stylets in its proboscis or rostrum used to pierce the exoskeleton of its prey. Saliva is then injected into the prey which liquifies its tissues, and the rostrum is then used to suck out the digested fluids. If disturbed, it is capable of a defensive bite considered to be more painful than a bee sting. It is also known to spit venom that can cause temporary blindness in humans.

Prey typically consists of cockroaches, crickets, flies, darkling beetles and caterpillars.

It was thought that they breed both sexually and through parthenogenesis, this however has recently been proved to not be true. Whilst unmated females will lay eggs, they are infertile. Development takes six to nine weeks from egg to adult and life span for the adult is about two years. The first molt occurs at about two weeks Development is hemimetabolous, meaning that there is no metamorphosis between a larval phase and an adult phase. The young are called nymphs, and appear to be small adults.

Common names include white-eyed assassin bug, twin spotted assassin bug and white spot assassin bug referring to the two large white spots on the wings.

Platymeris biguttatus is endemic to tropical Africa; it is found in countries such as Senegal, Gambia, Guinea, Mali, Ivory Coast, Togo, Benin, Niger, Nigeria, Chad, Sudan, Ethiopia, Somalia, the Democratic Republic of Congo, Uganda, Kenya, Tanzania, Zambia, Zimbabwe, and Mozambique in humid tropical forest, particularly hollow tree stumps and decaying logs.
