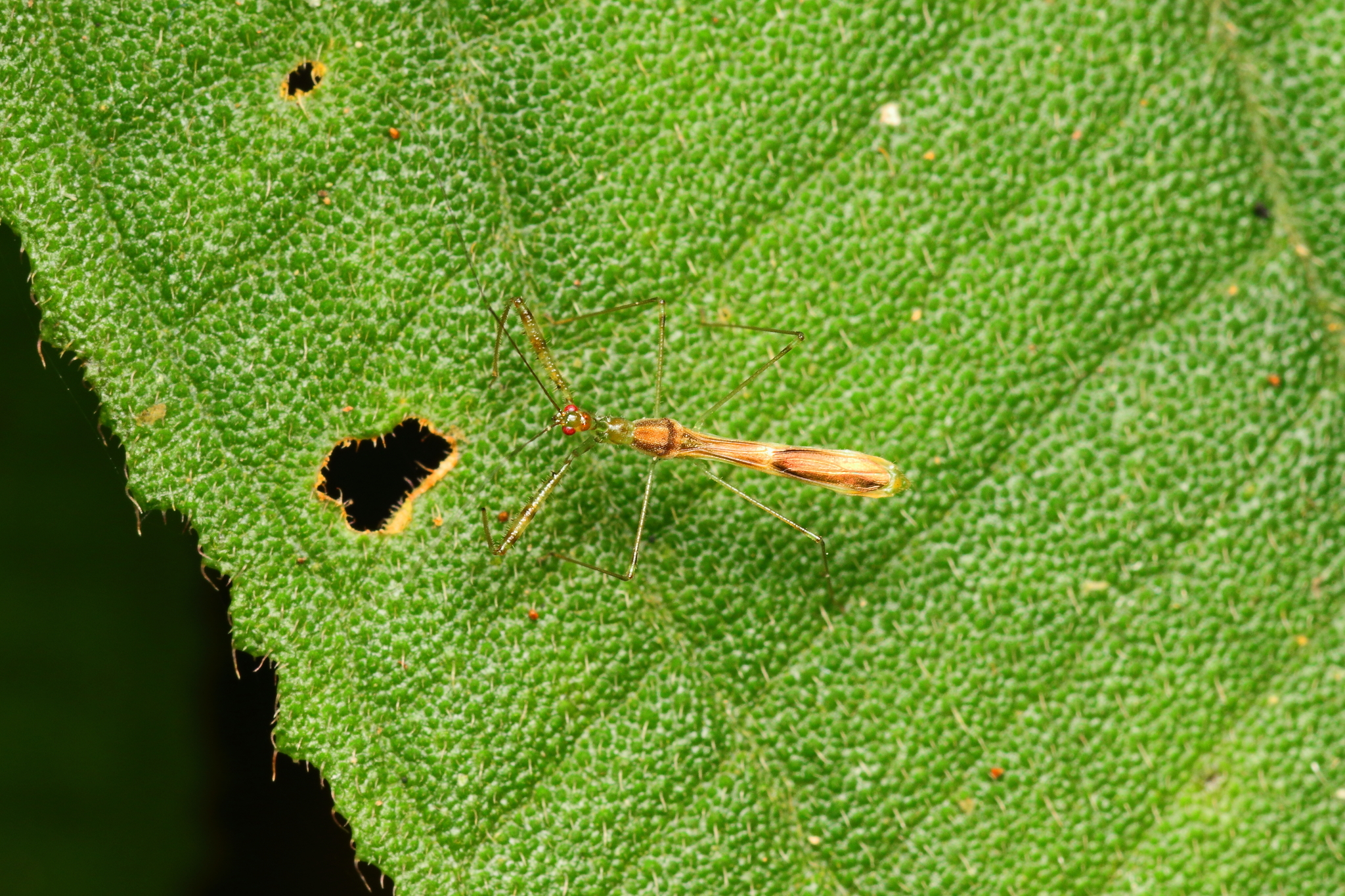

Scientific classification
- Kingdom: Animalia
- Phylum: Arthropoda
- Clade: Pancrustacea
- Class: Insecta
- Order: Hemiptera
- Suborder: Heteroptera
- Family: Reduviidae
- Genus: Bactrodes
- Species: B. biannulatus

Binomial name
- Bactrodes biannulatus Stål, 1860

= Bactrodes biannulatus =

Species of insect

Bactrodes biannulatus is a species of assassin bug found in Mexico and Brazil.
