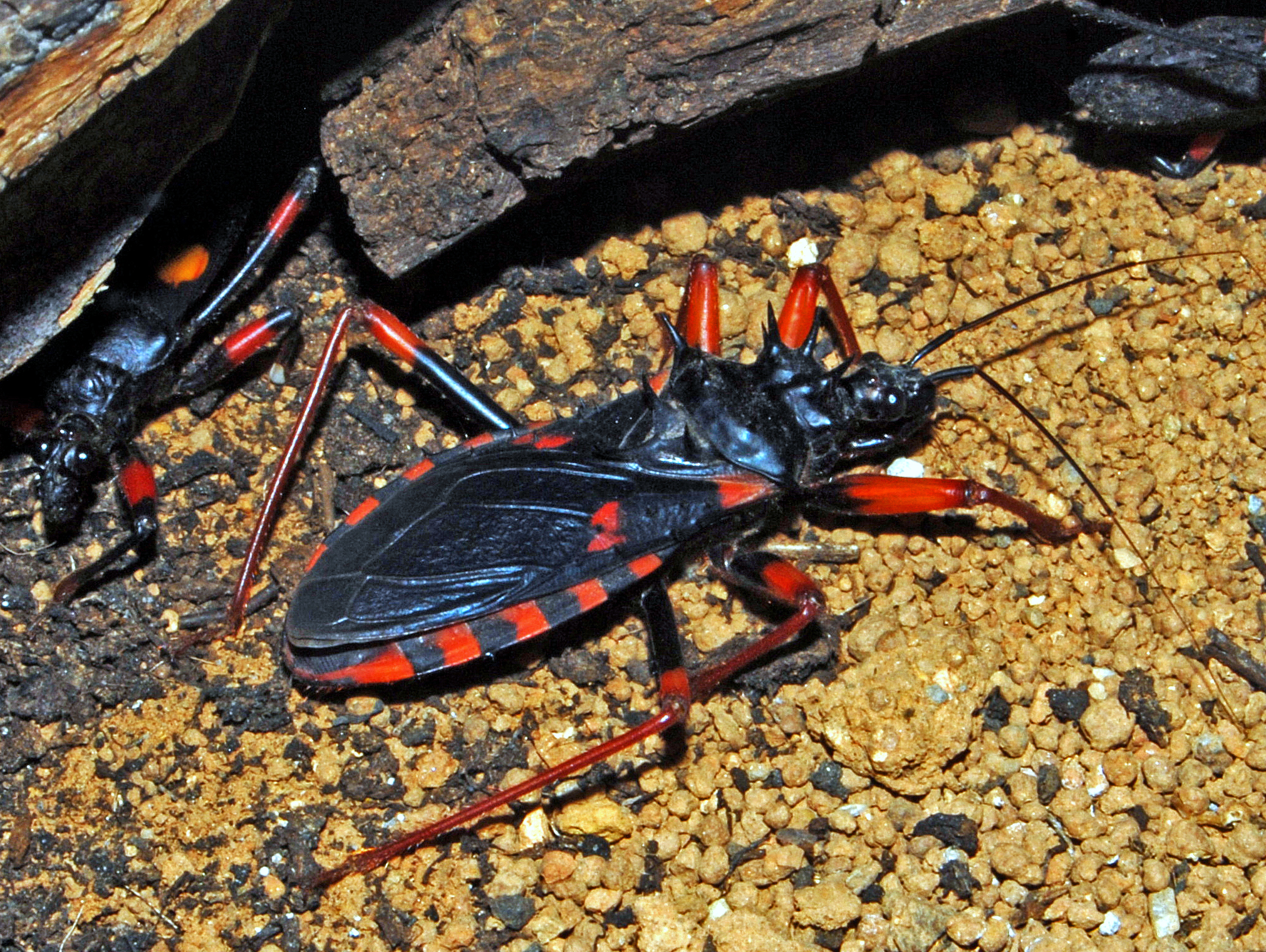
- A live individual of Psyttala horrida

Scientific classification
- Kingdom: Animalia
- Phylum: Arthropoda
- Clade: Pancrustacea
- Class: Insecta
- Order: Hemiptera
- Suborder: Heteroptera
- Family: Reduviidae
- Genus: Psyttala
- Species: P. horrida

Binomial name
- Psyttala horrida (Stål, 1865)

Synonyms
- Platymeris horrida Stål, 1865

= Psyttala horrida =

Species of true bug

Psyttala horrida is an insect in the assassin bug genus Psyttala. It is commonly called the horrid king assassin bug or giant spiny assassin bug. The genus name is sometimes misspelled as Psytalla, but the original author Carl Stål spelt it Psyttala.

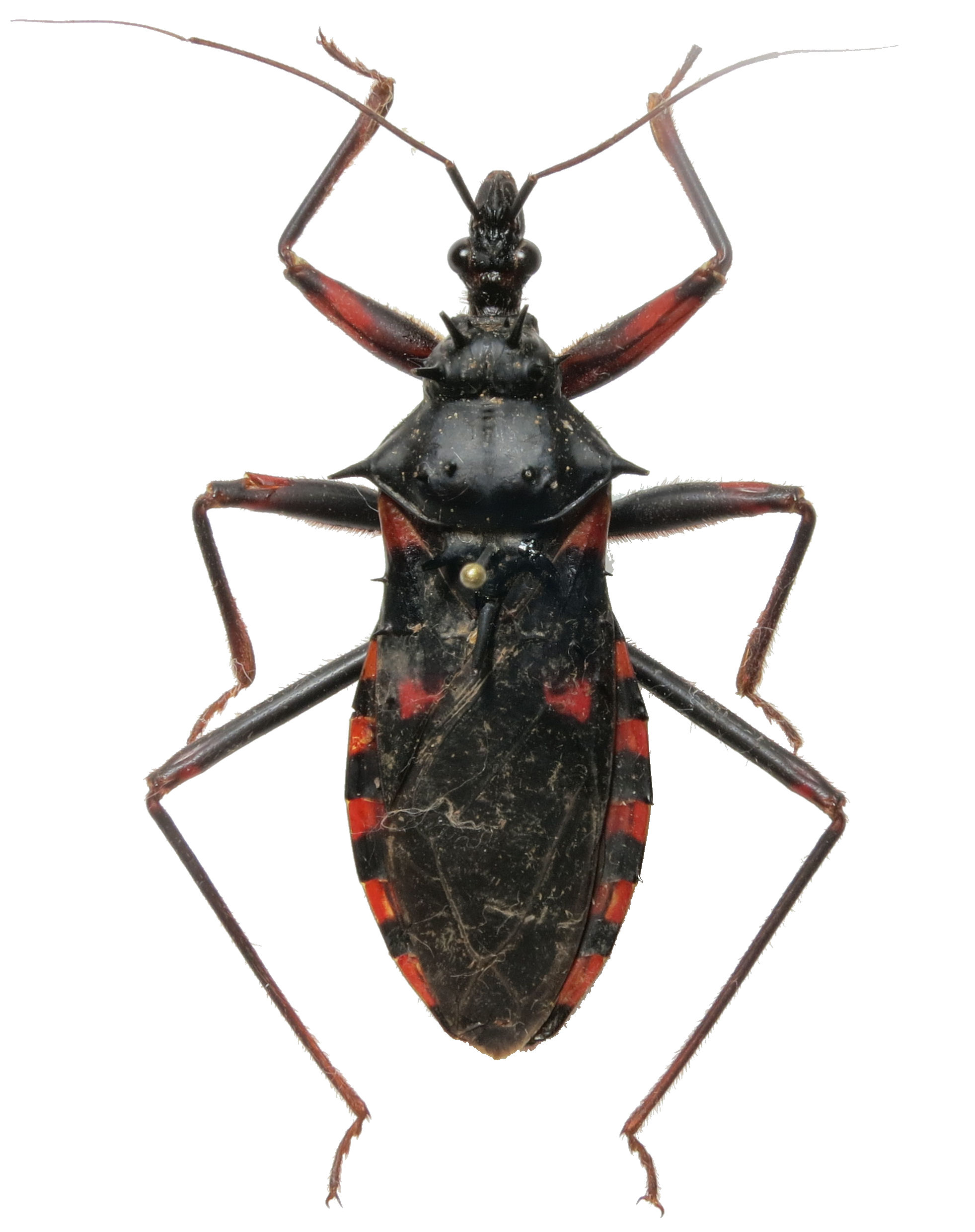
Mounted specimen from Togo

== Taxonomy ==
The species was first described by Carl Stål in 1865 as Platymeris horrida. Stål had previously synonymized his genus Psyttala with Platymeris.

== Distribution ==
This species is endemic to tropical western Africa, from Togo to Cameroon.

== Description ==
Psyttala horrida can reach a body length of 3–4.5 centimetres (1.2–1.8 in). and over 5 centimetres (2.0 in) in private collections. It is the largest species of assassin bug in the world. These large and sturdy built insects are characterized by an elongated head, a relatively narrow neck and a rigid, prominent, segmented, tubular mouthparts or proboscis (also called rostrum). Antennae are long and thin. The basic color of the body is black. They show a very prominent crown of thorns on thorax and red and black warning colors on the edge of the abdomen (laterotergites). On the hemelytra are present a few red markings. Legs are rather long, with red and black femurs and completely red tibiae. This species presents an evident sexual dimorphism. In fact the underside of the female's abdomen is completely smooth, while the males at the end of the abdomen have a round outgrowth.

== Biology and behavior ==
Females lay their eggs in the substrate a few weeks after mating. The incubation may last four to six weeks. The young insects at birth measure about five millimeters. They have a red thorax and abdomen and yellow legs. The chest turns black within a few days. The growth lasts between six and eight months and the young will make six moults to reach the adult stage. Adults live on average one to two years.

These terrestrial ambush predators live hidden in timber or dead trees during the day, coming out at night to feed on their prey, that they kill with the venom injected by their rigid rostrum. They can also spray a noxious fluid.
