= Reduvius sonoraensis =

Scientific classification
- Domain: Eukaryota
- Kingdom: Animalia
- Phylum: Arthropoda
- Class: Insecta
- Order: Hemiptera
- Suborder: Heteroptera
- Family: Reduviidae
- Genus: Reduvius
- Species: R. sonoraensis

Binomial name
- Reduvius sonoraensis Usinger, 1942

Species of true bug

Reduvius sonoraensis is a species of assassin bug in the family Reduviidae. It is found in Central America and North America. It can have two types that are discernably different by the fifth instar: those with short wing pads and those with long wing pads.
