= Durevius =

Scientific classification
- Kingdom: Animalia
- Phylum: Arthropoda
- Class: Insecta
- Order: Hemiptera
- Suborder: Heteroptera
- Family: Reduviidae
- Subfamily: Reduviinae
- Genus: Durevius; Villiers, 1962

Genus of true bugs

Durevius is a small genus of assassin bugs restricted to the island of Madagascar. Five species are known.

== Partial list of species ==
- Durevius piceus Villiers 1962
- Durevius tuberculatus Villiers 1950
- Durevius usingeri Villiers 1960
