= Reduvius senilis =

Scientific classification
- Kingdom: Animalia
- Phylum: Arthropoda
- Class: Insecta
- Order: Hemiptera
- Suborder: Heteroptera
- Family: Reduviidae
- Genus: Reduvius
- Species: R. senilis

Binomial name
- Reduvius senilis Van Duzee, 1906

Species of true bug

Reduvius senilis is a species of assassin bug in the family Reduviidae. It is found in Central America and North America.
