= Reduvius vanduzeei =

Scientific classification
- Domain: Eukaryota
- Kingdom: Animalia
- Phylum: Arthropoda
- Class: Insecta
- Order: Hemiptera
- Suborder: Heteroptera
- Family: Reduviidae
- Genus: Reduvius
- Species: R. vanduzeei

Binomial name
- Reduvius vanduzeei Wygodzinsky & Usinger, 1964

Species of true bug

Reduvius vanduzeei is a species of assassin bug in the family Reduviidae. It is found in North America.
