= Zeluroides americanus =

Scientific classification
- Kingdom: Animalia
- Phylum: Arthropoda
- Class: Insecta
- Order: Hemiptera
- Suborder: Heteroptera
- Family: Reduviidae
- Genus: Zeluroides
- Species: Z. americanus

Binomial name
- Zeluroides americanus Lent & Wygodzinsky, 1948

Species of true bug

Zeluroides americanus is a species of assassin bug in the family Reduviidae. It is found in Central America and North America.

== Subspecies ==
These three subspecies belong to the species Zeluroides americanus:

- Zeluroides americanus americanus
- Zeluroides americanus colima Lent & Wygodzinsky, 1959
- Zeluroides americanus medianus Lent & Wygodzinsky, 1959
