= Pseudozelurus =

Scientific classification
- Kingdom: Animalia
- Phylum: Arthropoda
- Clade: Pancrustacea
- Class: Insecta
- Order: Hemiptera
- Suborder: Heteroptera
- Family: Reduviidae
- Subfamily: Reduviinae
- Genus: Pseudozelurus; Lent & Wygodzinsky, 1947

Genus of true bugs

Pseudozelurus is a genus of assassin bugs in the family Reduviidae. There are at least two described species in Pseudozelurus.

== Species ==
These two species belong to the genus Pseudozelurus:

- Pseudozelurus arizonicus (Banks, 1910)
- Pseudozelurus superbus (Champion, 1899)
