= Zeluroides =

Scientific classification
- Kingdom: Animalia
- Phylum: Arthropoda
- Clade: Pancrustacea
- Class: Insecta
- Order: Hemiptera
- Suborder: Heteroptera
- Family: Reduviidae
- Subfamily: Reduviinae
- Genus: Zeluroides; Lent & Wygodzinsky, 1948

Genus of true bugs

Zeluroides is a genus of assassin bugs in the family Reduviidae. There are at least two described species in Zeluroides.

== Species ==
These two species belong to the genus Zeluroides:

- Zeluroides americanus Lent & Wygodzinsky, 1948
- Zeluroides mexicanus Lent & Wygodzinsky, 1948
