= Lenaeus (bug) =

Scientific classification
- Domain: Eukaryota
- Kingdom: Animalia
- Phylum: Arthropoda
- Class: Insecta
- Order: Hemiptera
- Suborder: Heteroptera
- Family: Reduviidae
- Subfamily: Reduviinae
- Genus: Lenaeus; Stål, 1859

Genus of true bugs

Lenaeus is a genus of assassin bugs.

== Partial list of species ==
- Lenaeus indicus Miller, 1954
- Lenaeus pyrrhus Stål, 1859
