= Centrocnemidinae =

Scientific classification
- Domain: Eukaryota
- Kingdom: Animalia
- Phylum: Arthropoda
- Class: Insecta
- Order: Hemiptera
- Suborder: Heteroptera
- Family: Reduviidae
- Subfamily: Centrocnemidinae; Miller, 1956

Subfamily of true bugs

The Centrocnemidinae are a subfamily of the reduviid (assassin bugs), found exclusively on tree trunks, where their bodies camouflage well. There are four genera with about 34 species described.

== Genera ==
- Centrocnemis Signoret, 1852
- Centrocnemoides Miller, 1956
- Neocentrocnemis Miller, 1956
- Paracentrocnemis Miller, 1956
