= Holotrichius =

Scientific classification
- Kingdom: Animalia
- Phylum: Arthropoda
- Class: Insecta
- Order: Hemiptera
- Suborder: Heteroptera
- Family: Reduviidae
- Genus: Holotrichius; Burmeister, 1835

Species
- See text

Genus of true bugs

Holotrichius is a genus of assassin bugs.

== Species ==
The genus includes the following species:

- Holotrichius apterus Jakovlev, 1879
- Holotrichius bergrothi
- Holotrichius bodenhiemeri Dispons, 1962
- Holotrichius denudatus A. Costa, 1842
- Holotrichius innesi Horvath, 1910
- Holotrichius luctuosus Mulsant & Mayet, 1868
- Holotrichius obtusangulus
- Holotrichius putoni Reuter, 1909
- Holotrichius reuterianus Dispons, 1961
- Holotrichius rotundatus Stål, 1874
- Holotrichius squalidus Douglas & Scott, 1868
- Holotrichius tenebrosus Burmeister, 1835
