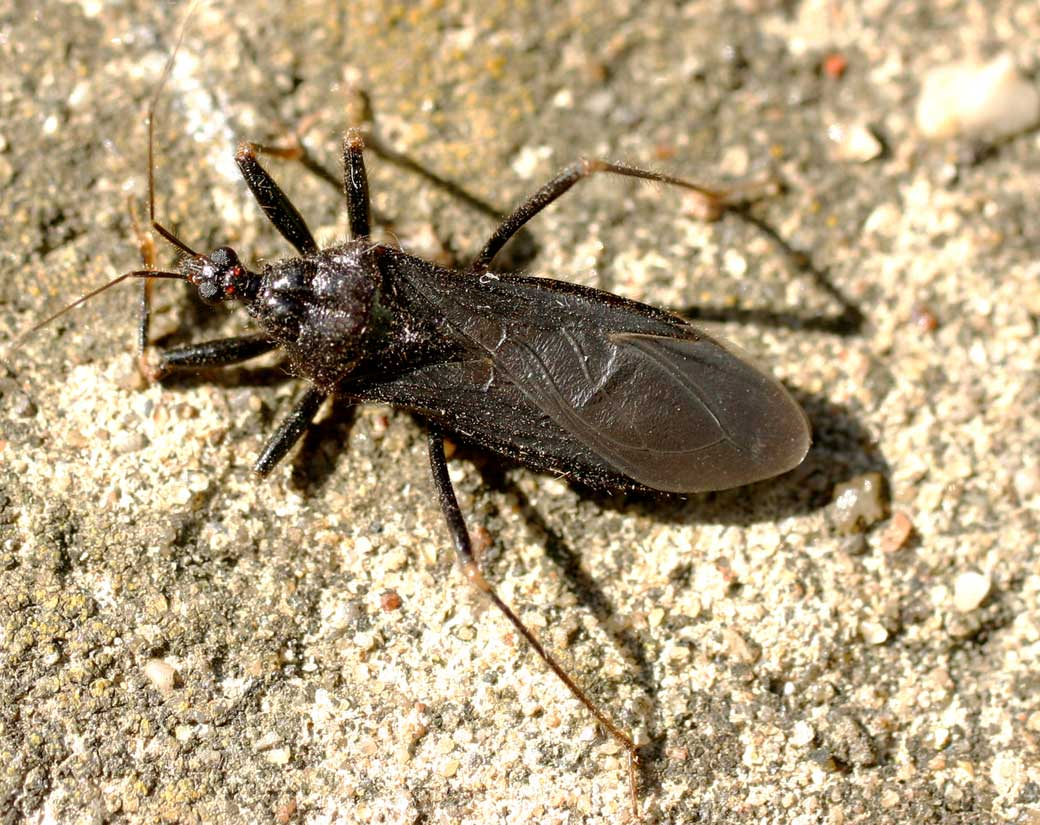
- Reduvius personatus

Scientific classification
- Kingdom: Animalia
- Phylum: Arthropoda
- Class: Insecta
- Order: Hemiptera
- Suborder: Heteroptera
- Family: Reduviidae
- Subfamily: Reduviinae
- Genus: Reduvius; Fabricius, 1775

= Reduvius =

Genus of true bugs

Reduvius is a large genus of reduviids. The masked hunter, Reduvius personatus, is an example of this genus.

They measure 8–22 mm. They are the largest predatory insects and one of the largest clades of predatory insects. They are found in many terrestrial ecosystems and microhabitats, ranging from mammal burrows in the desert to logs in rainforests.

== Partial list of species ==
- Reduvius fedtschenkianus (Oshanin, 1871)
- Reduvius jakovleffi Reuter, 1892
- Reduvius pallipes Klug, 1830
- Reduvius personatus (Linnaeus, 1758) "masked hunter"
- Reduvius senilis Van Duzee, 1906
- Reduvius sonoraensis Usinger, 1942
- Reduvius testaceus Herrich-Schaeffer, 1845
- Reduvius vanduzeei Wygodzinsky & Usinger, 1964
