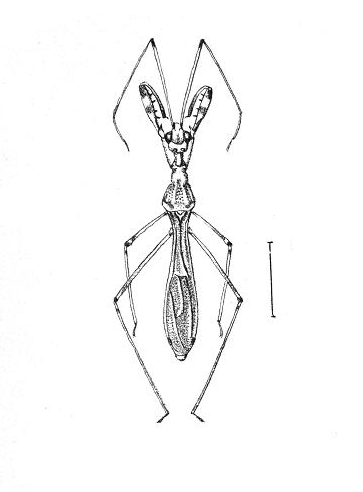
- Bactrodes spinulosus Stål, 1862

Scientific classification
- Kingdom: Animalia
- Phylum: Arthropoda
- Clade: Pancrustacea
- Class: Insecta
- Order: Hemiptera
- Suborder: Heteroptera
- Family: Reduviidae
- Subfamily: Bactrodinae; Stål, 1866

= Bactrodinae =

Subfamily of true bugs

The Bactrodinae are a small subfamily of the reduviid (assassin bugs). Only one genus and five species have been described to date, all from the Neotropical Region (South America). These bugs are slender and long-legged, the first antennal segment is long and the eyes jut out. They also have ocelli placed on raised protrusions.

== List of genera ==
- Bactrodes Stål, 1860
