= Rhynocoris marginatus =

Scientific classification
- Domain: Eukaryota
- Kingdom: Animalia
- Phylum: Arthropoda
- Class: Insecta
- Order: Hemiptera
- Suborder: Heteroptera
- Family: Reduviidae
- Tribe: Harpactorini
- Genus: Rhynocoris
- Species: R. marginatus

Binomial name
- Rhynocoris marginatus (Fabricius, 1794)

Species of assassin bug

Rhynocoris marginatus is a species of assassin bug in the family Reduviidae. It is a predator of other insects and is found in Asia. Crops in India on which it has been found feeding on pests include sugarcane, pigeon pea, cardamom, cotton, tea, and peanuts. The insects are potentially useful in biological control because they are more resistant to pesticides than are the pests on which they feed.

== Morphology ==
From the family Reduviidae, R. marginatus' success as a predator in agricultural systems is due to unique morphological and physiological adaptations for the predation of other insects. Most notably among these adaptations is their extra-oral digestion feeding mechanism, as well as a three-segmented rostrum, or barb, armed with a number of hair-like mechanical and chemical sensors, used not only to sense and determine the suitability of their prey, but also to deliver venomous saliva to paralyse their victims. Unique to R. marginatus is their accessory salivary glands which function as water recapturing organs that recirculate water from the body to keep a steady flow of watery saliva going as they feed, helping the predator to flush out predigested food from the body of its prey.

== Biology ==
Rhynocoris marginatus as one of the largest and most easily recognized assassin bugs found in semi-arid, scrub jungle, tropical forests and agroecosystems. Assassin bugs are hemimetabolous and do not undergo metamorphosis. Instead, the egg hatches into a miniature version of the adult form, and at each growth stage the nymph becomes more and more like the adult form.

== Use in biological control ==
Rhynocoris marginatus reported natural enemies belonging to Coleoptera (6 species), Araneidae (5 species), Hymenoptera (6 species), Reduviidae (3 species) and Odonata (1 species) from both Thoothukudi and Tirunelveli districts of Tamil Nadu. Rhynocoris marginatus is a generalist predator, feeding on at least twenty species of crop pest and occurring naturally in cotton, groundnut and soybean crops. Different life stages have different food preferences, but in general, when offered various choices, the larva of the tobacco cutworm Spodoptera litura (a moth larva) was the first choice, followed by Helicoverpa armigera, Aproaerema modicella and Amsacta albistriga in that order. R. marginatus is one of the most common and widespread predatory insects in Indian agricultural areas. This assassin bug is attracted by the kairomones emitted by its prey; even the shed scales of adult moths provide an odour that attracts the bugs.

Among pests of cotton crops, three species of moth larvae are more attractive to the assassin bug than are the sap-sucking hemipteran Dysdercus cingulatus and two species of beetles in the genus Mylabris. Feeding on the moth larvae results in the assassin bug growing faster than on other diets, and research suggests that the bug may be effective in biological control of moth larvae in cotton.
