= Psyttala =

Scientific classification
- Kingdom: Animalia
- Phylum: Arthropoda
- Class: Insecta
- Order: Hemiptera
- Suborder: Heteroptera
- Family: Reduviidae
- Subfamily: Reduviinae
- Genus: Psyttala; Stål, 1859

Synonyms
- Psytalla Auctt. (Missp.)

Genus of true bugs

Psyttala is a genus of insects belonging to the assassin bugs. The genus name is commonly misspelled as Psytalla (e.g.), but the original author Carl Stål spelt it Psyttala.

== Species ==
- Psyttala ducalis (Westwood, 1845)
- Psyttala dudgeoni Distant, 1919
- Psyttala horrida (Stål, 1865)
- Psyttala incognita Distant, 1919
- Psyttala johnstoni Distant, 1919
- Psyttala samwelli Distant, 1919
