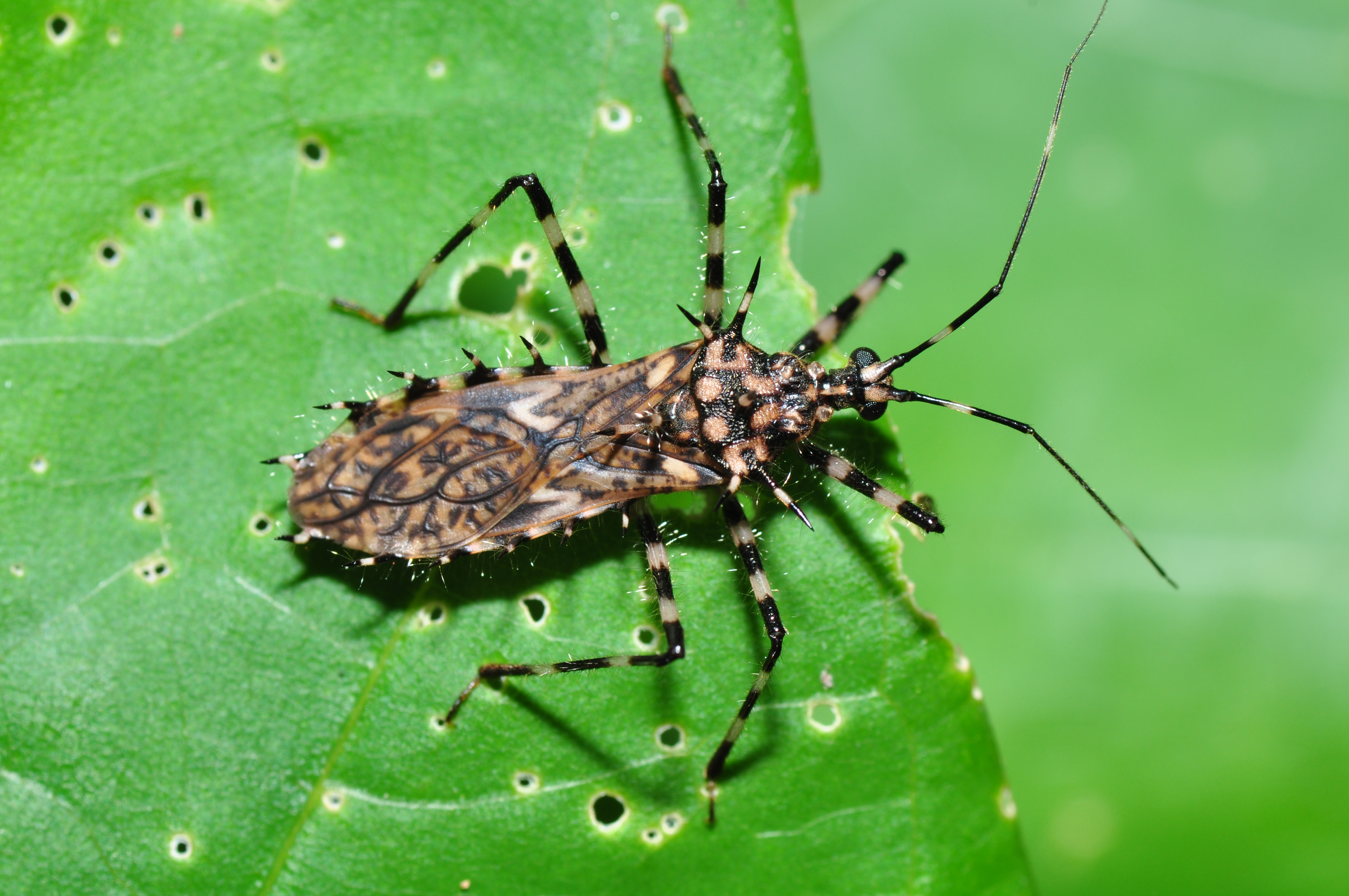
- Salyavata variegata
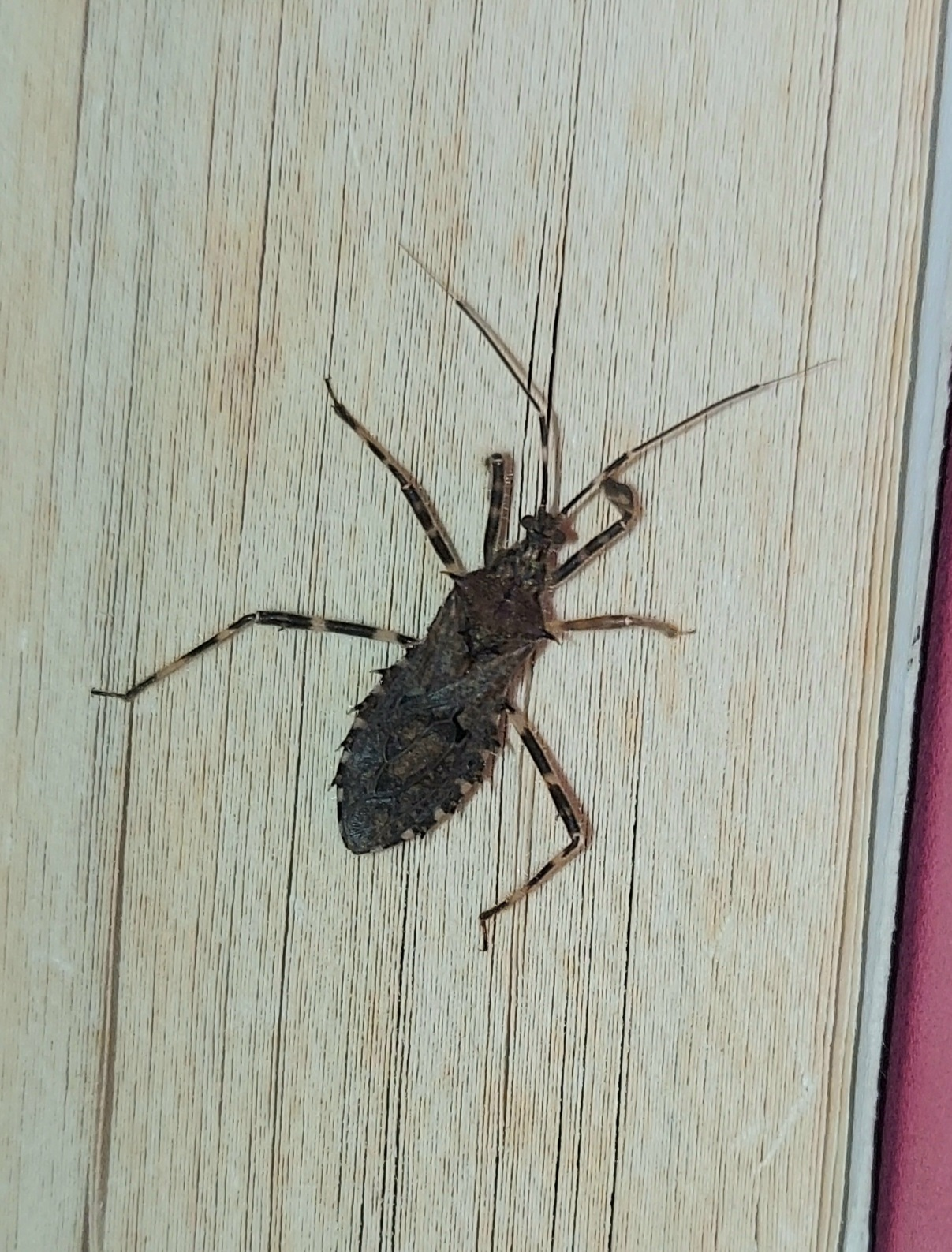
- Rhachicephala sp.

Scientific classification
- Kingdom: Animalia
- Phylum: Arthropoda
- Class: Insecta
- Order: Hemiptera
- Suborder: Heteroptera
- Family: Reduviidae
- Subfamily: Salyavatinae; Amyot & Audinet-Serville, 1843

Type genus
- Salyavata Amyot & Audinet-Serville, 1843

= Salyavatinae =

Subfamily of true bugs

Salyavatinae are a subfamily of the assassin bugs. They have a pan-tropical distribution with about 16 genera. They have two foretarsal segments and have a patch of fine hairs known as the fossula spongiosa on the fore and mid tibia. Many species tend to have spines on the head, pronotum, legs and abdomen. A few species have the foretibia flattened into leaf-like structures.

- Acosmetocoris Miller, 1954
- Alvilla Stål, 1874
- Araneaster Hesse, 1925
- Elaphocranus Bergroth, 1904
- Eudima Schouteden, 1912
- Lisarda Stål, 1859
- Paralisarda Miller, 1957
- Petalocheirus Palisot de Beauvois, 1805
- Platychiria Herrich-Schäffer, 1850
- Rhachicephala Truong, Zhao & Cai, 2007
- Rulandus Distant, 1904
- Salyavata Amyot & Audinet-Serville, 1843
- Syberna Stål, 1874
- Tragelaphodes Bergroth, 1904
- Tritavus Hesse, 1925
- Valentia Stål, 1865
