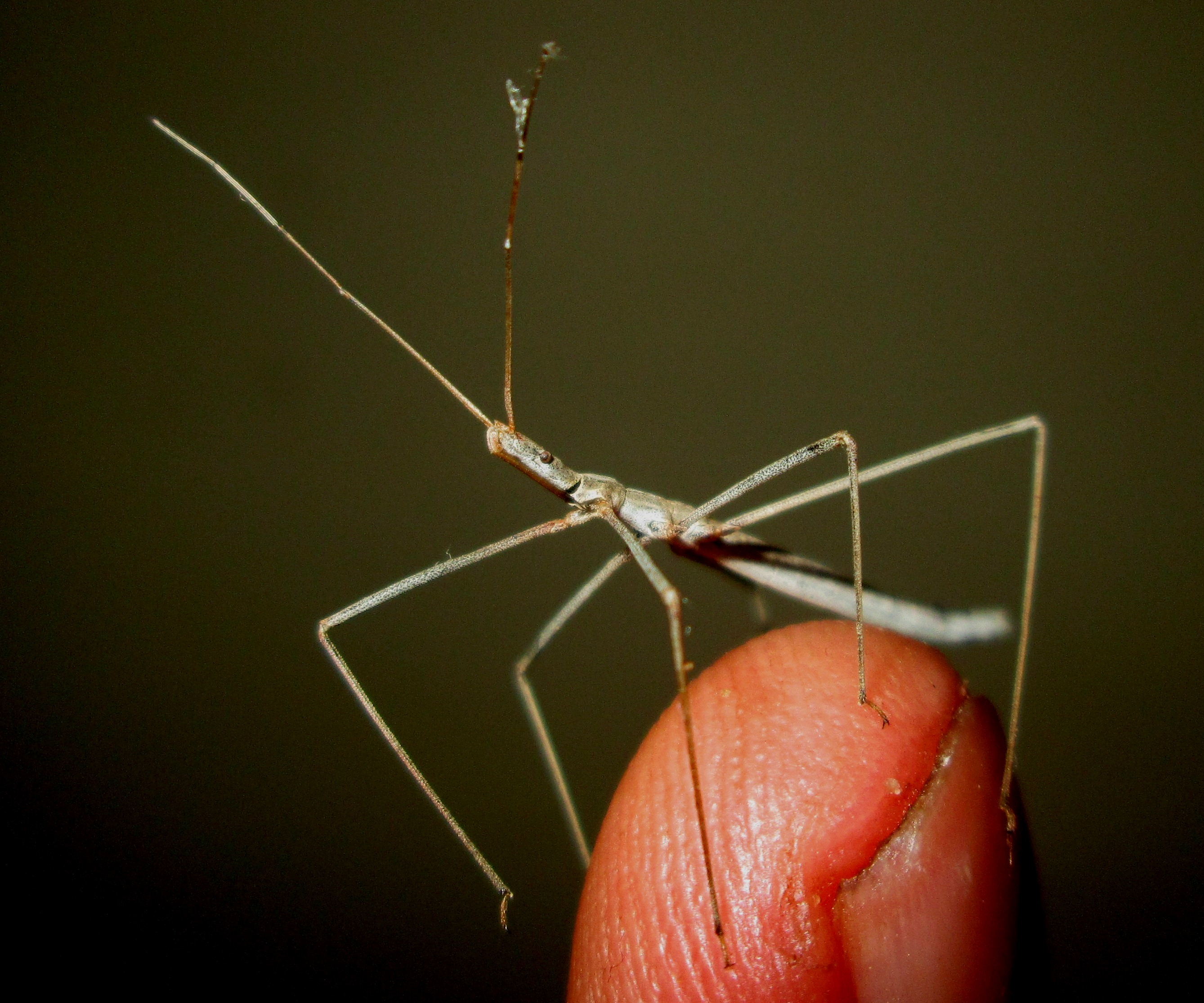
- Lopodytes species

Scientific classification
- Kingdom: Animalia
- Phylum: Arthropoda
- Clade: Pancrustacea
- Class: Insecta
- Order: Hemiptera
- Suborder: Heteroptera
- Family: Reduviidae
- Subfamily: Harpactorinae
- Tribe: Harpactorini
- Genus: Lopodytes; Stål, 1853 Rondani, 1867

Type species
- Lopodytes grassator Stål, 1853

= Lopodytes =

Genus of true bugs

Lopodytes Rondani 1867 is a genus in the family Reduviidae, the assassin bugs. Members of the genus have been unofficially assigned the common name grass assassin bugs, but generally this name remains meaningful only to naturalists, because these insects have been too well camouflaged to raise robust public awareness.

== Description ==
Lopodytes species are small-to-medium-sized bugs, measuring between 10 and 20 mm in length. They are however very gracile and elongate in build, with nearly parallel sides, so they are far less massive than most insects of a similar bodily length. Usually they occur in savanna grass and similar vegetation, but on a level surface they generally adopt a very horizontal posture that emphasizes their resemblance to the thread assassins, the Emesinae. They easily may be confused with the Emesinae, but they are somewhat less gracile, typically 50% to 100% larger in linear measurement, and unlike the Emesinae, they do not have raptorial front legs.

In color Lopodytes species generally are a range of dusty greyish yellows to browns, shades that combine with their shape to make them inconspicuous in the partly dried tussock grasses that they normally inhabit. They probably are noticed far less often in the field than when they come to lights at night in certain seasons.

== Etymology ==
The name Lopodytes could well be a source of confusion. It might refer to the Ancient Greek root λοπος, meaning bark or covering, plus δυτης, a diver, suggesting a creature that hides under coverings, but it might more likely derive from λοποδυτατ, an old word for a robber that stripped the clothing off victims.

Furthermore, there is a genus of ducks, Lophodytes which is sufficiently similar in spelling to cause either confusion in reference or errors in typing.

== Biology ==
The biology of Lopodytes species has not been much studied. They appear to be predators of small insects, typical of Reduviid specialised for life in tussock grasses in savanna-like areas. As a rule both sexes are winged, but wingless forms occur. They have been reported to come to lights, but only occasionally. In those species for which observations have been recorded, the eggs are very elongate and are laid on grass stems either singly or in small clusters.

== Taxonomy and distribution ==
The genus Lopodytes is in the order Hemiptera, suborder Heteroptera, family Reduviidae, subfamily Harpactorinae. Some sources give the genus authority as Rondani, 1867, but others credit Stål, 1853, Ofv. Vet.-Ak. Fork. 10, p. 263.

The genus is native to the savanna and near-savanna regions of Africa, mainly south of the Sahara.

The following species have been described, some within indicated ranges.

- Lopodytes agilis Miller, 1950 Malawi, Botswana, Zimbabwe
- Lopodytes arenicola Schouteden, 1932
- Lopodytes armatus Villiers, 1948
- Lopodytes baoule Villiers, 1965
- Lopodytes bequaerti Schouteden, 1913
- Lopodytes collarti Schouteden, 1932
- Lopodytes dolichomerus Reuter, 1881
- Lopodytes flavoniger
- Lopodytes grassator Stål, 1853 Zimbabwe, Namibia, Transvaal, Cape (Western Cape, Eastern Cape), KwaZulu-Natal
- Lopodytes kasaicus Schouteden, 1932
- Lopodytes katangae Schouteden, 1952
- Lopodytes kivuensis Schouteden, 1952
- Lopodytes longispinus Villiers, 1945
- Lopodytes macellus Villiers, 1952
- Lopodytes mashonae Distant, 1903 Zimbabwe
- Lopodytes nigrescens Miller, 1950 Tanzania, Zimbabwe
- Lopodytes pallida Schouteden, 1932
- Lopodytes palustris Linnavuori, 1974
- Lopodytes punctulatus Villiers, 1983
- Lopodytes quadrispinosus Villiers, 1948
- Lopodytes schoutedeni Maldonado, 1953
- Lopodytes scopsi Schouteden, 1952
- Lopodytes spectabilis Miller, 1941
- Lopodytes spiniger Reuter, 1881 Namibia
- Lopodytes testaceus Villiers, 1960
- Lopodytes transvaalensis Miller, 1956 Northern Transvaal
- Lopodytes tuberculatus Villiers, 1948
- Lopodytes victoriae Miller, 1956 Zimbabwe
