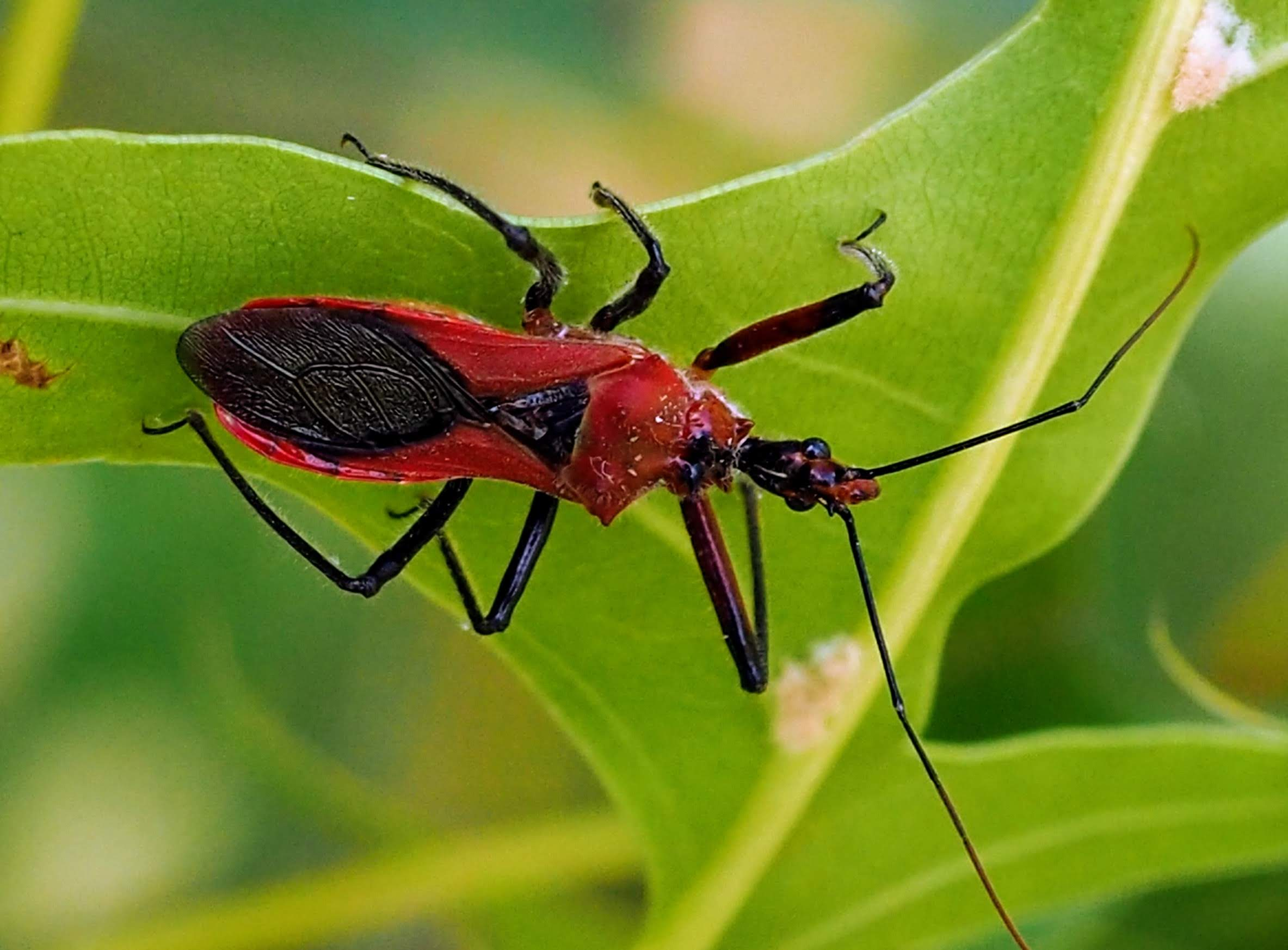
- Gminatus australis (dorsal view)

Scientific classification
- Domain: Eukaryota
- Kingdom: Animalia
- Phylum: Arthropoda
- Class: Insecta
- Order: Hemiptera
- Suborder: Heteroptera
- Family: Reduviidae
- Genus: Gminatus
- Species: G. australis

Binomial name
- Gminatus australis (Erichson, 1842)

Synonyms
- ? australis Erichson, 1842; Leana australis (Erichson, 1842)

= Gminatus australis =

Species of true bug

Gminatus australis is a species of true bug in the family Reduviidae.

== Description ==
Body red and orange, legs and head black. Mouthparts short, thick and curved. Body up to 1 centimetre (0.39 in) long.

== Range ==
South-western and eastern mainland Australia and Tasmania.
