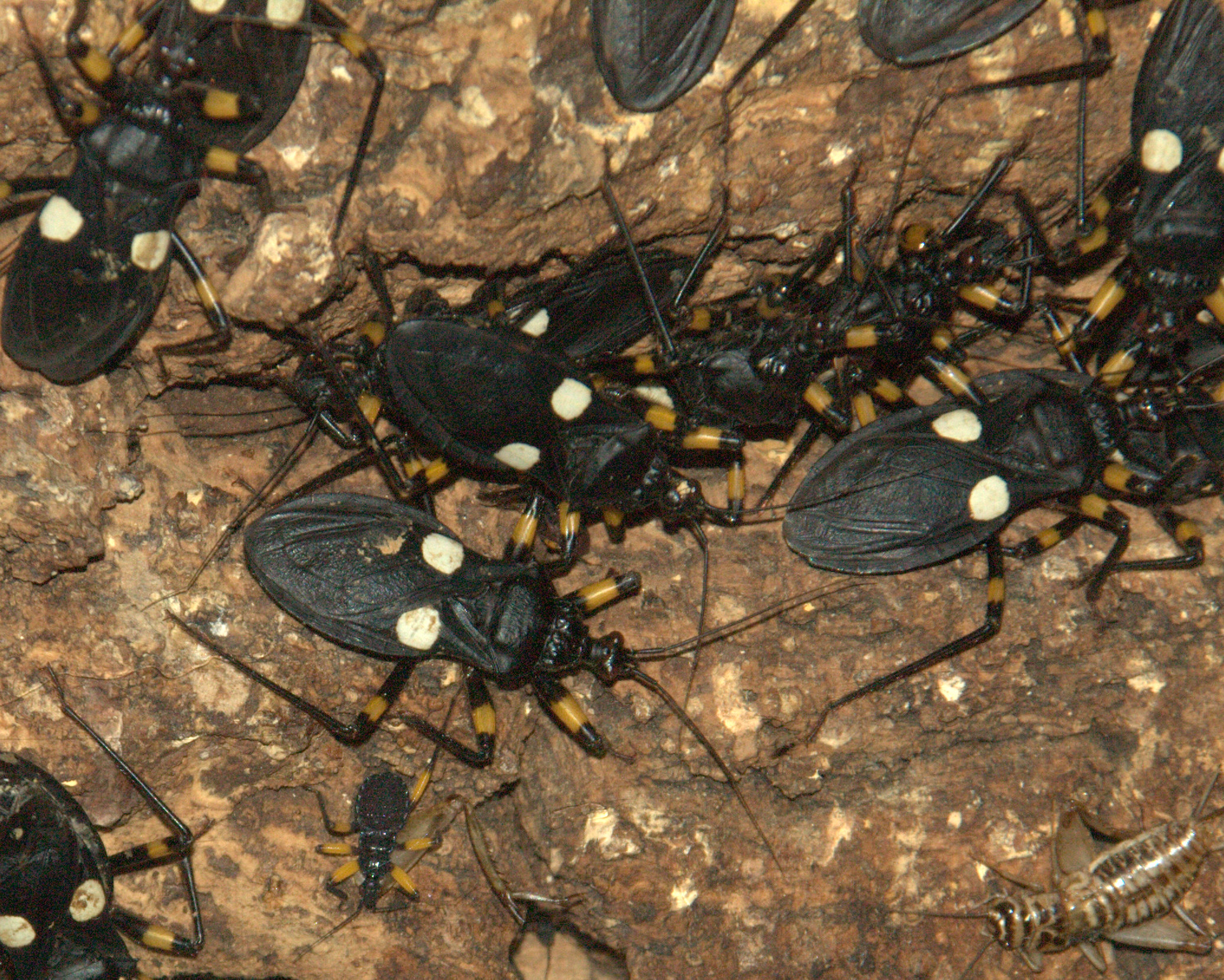
- Platymeris biguttatus

Scientific classification
- Kingdom: Animalia
- Phylum: Arthropoda
- Class: Insecta
- Order: Hemiptera
- Suborder: Heteroptera
- Family: Reduviidae
- Subfamily: Reduviinae
- Genus: Platymeris; Laporte, 1833

= Platymeris =

Genus of true bugs

Platymeris is a genus of assassin bug (Reduviidae). Platymeris species are often used in laboratories and as pets.

The venom of this genus has been studied in a laboratory setting.

== Species ==
- Platymeris biguttatus (Linnaeus, 1767)
- Platymeris charon Jeannel, 1917
- Platymeris erebus Distant, 1902
- Platymeris flavipes Bergroth, 1920
- Platymeris guttatipennis Stål, 1859
- Platymeris insignis Germar & Berendt, 1856
- Platymeris kavirondo Jeannel, 1917
- Platymeris laevicollis Distant, 1919
- Platymeris nigripes Villiers, 1944
- Platymeris pyrrhula Germar, 1837
- Platymeris rhadamanthus Gerstaecker, 1873
- Platymeris rufipes Jeannel, 1917
- Platymeris swirei Distant, 1919
