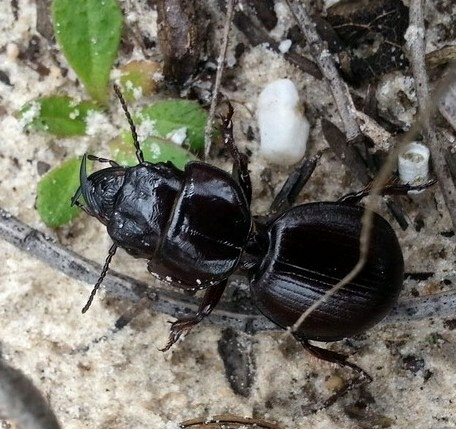
- Scaraphites hirtipes, Australia

Scientific classification
- Kingdom: Animalia
- Phylum: Arthropoda
- Class: Insecta
- Order: Coleoptera
- Suborder: Adephaga
- Family: Carabidae
- Subfamily: Scaritinae
- Tribe: Scaritini
- Subtribe: Carenina
- Genus: Scaraphites; Westwood, 1842

= Scaraphites =

Genus of beetles

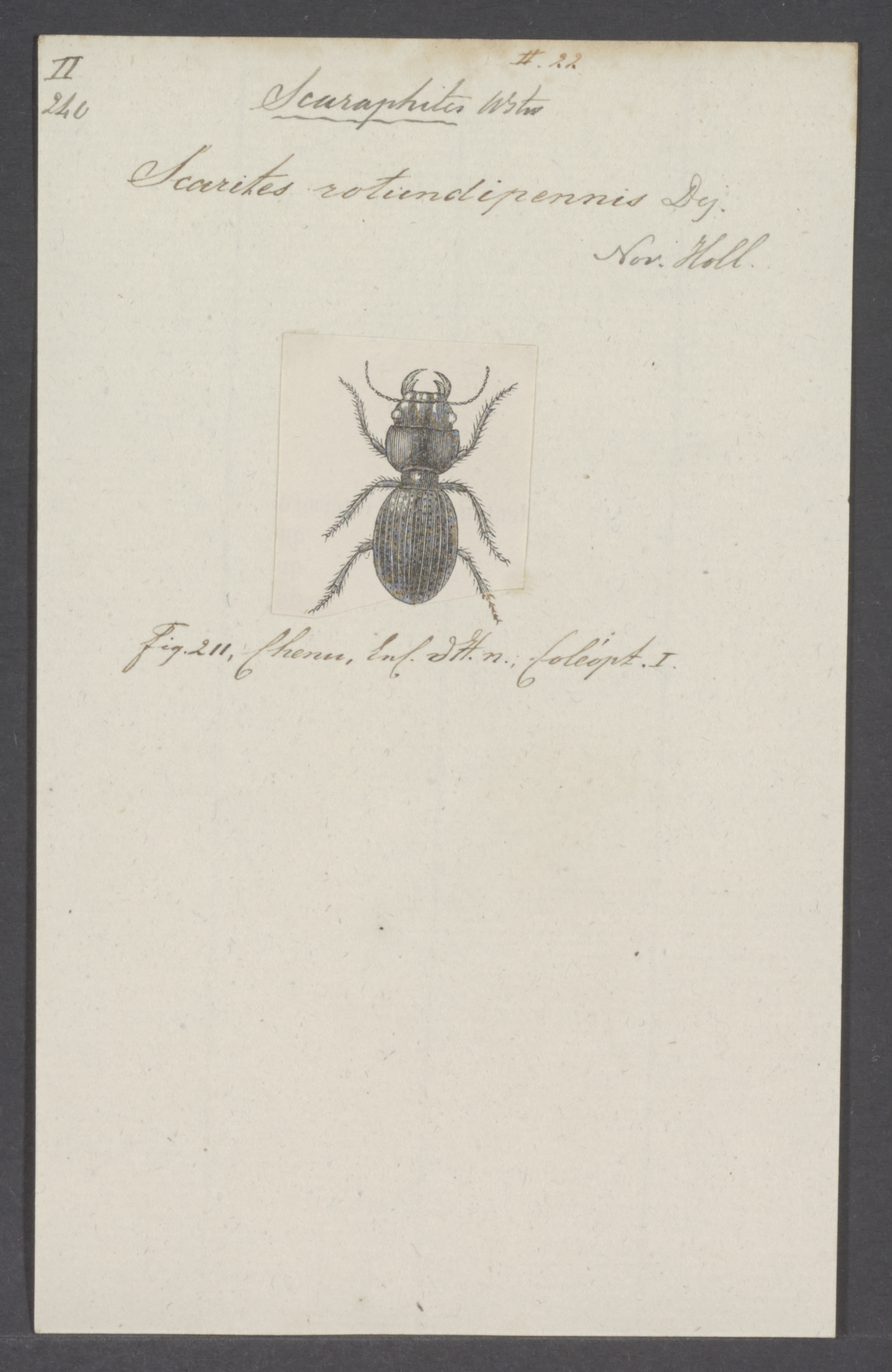

Scaraphites is a genus in the ground beetle family Carabidae. There are about seven described species in Scaraphites, found in Australia.

== Species ==
These seven species belong to the genus Scaraphites:

- Scaraphites hirtipes W. J. Macleay, 1864
- Scaraphites humeralis Laporte, 1867
- Scaraphites laticollis W. J. Macleay, 1866
- Scaraphites lenaeus Westwood, 1842
- Scaraphites lucidus Chaudoir, 1863
- Scaraphites rotundipennis (Dejean, 1825)
- Scaraphites silenus (Westwood, 1842)
