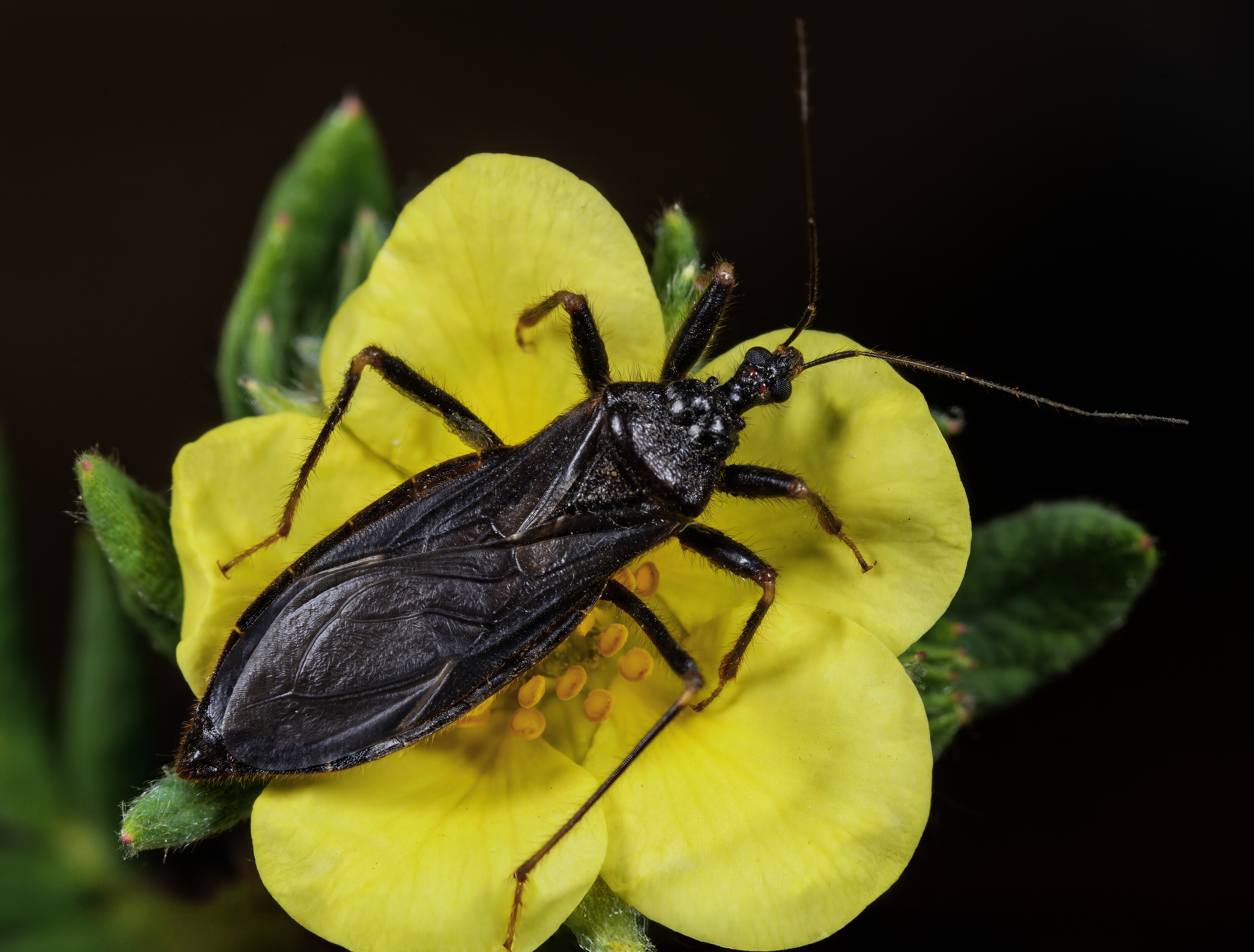

Scientific classification
- Kingdom: Animalia
- Phylum: Arthropoda
- Clade: Pancrustacea
- Class: Insecta
- Order: Hemiptera
- Suborder: Heteroptera
- Family: Reduviidae
- Genus: Reduvius
- Species: R. personatus

Binomial name
- Reduvius personatus (Linnaeus, 1758)

= Reduvius personatus =

Species of true bug

Reduvius personatus or the masked hunter is an insect belonging to the assassin bug (Reduviidae) family. The name is because its nymphs camouflage themselves with dust. The masked hunter is a predator of small arthropods, including woodlice, lacewings, earwigs, bed bugs and termites. Masked hunters do not feed on human blood, but can deliver a rostral stab to humans in self-defense when mishandled. The stab can be painful, but masked hunters do not carry Chagas disease, unlike the kissing bug for which they are sometimes mistaken.

== Identification ==
Adult masked hunters are uniformly dark brown to black in color and vary in length from 17–22 mm. They have an elongated head that includes a short, three-segmented beak, as well as long, slender antennae. Their abdomen is wide, extending in the middle beyond the wings to reveal the lateral margins of their abdominal segments. Nymphs of this species resemble the adult form and are naturally dark-colored, but often appear gray or light-colored due to a camouflage layer of debris covering them. Nymphs exude a sticky substance that covers their entire body, including the antennae and all six legs, which causes dust, lint, and other small particles to adhere to the surface of their body.

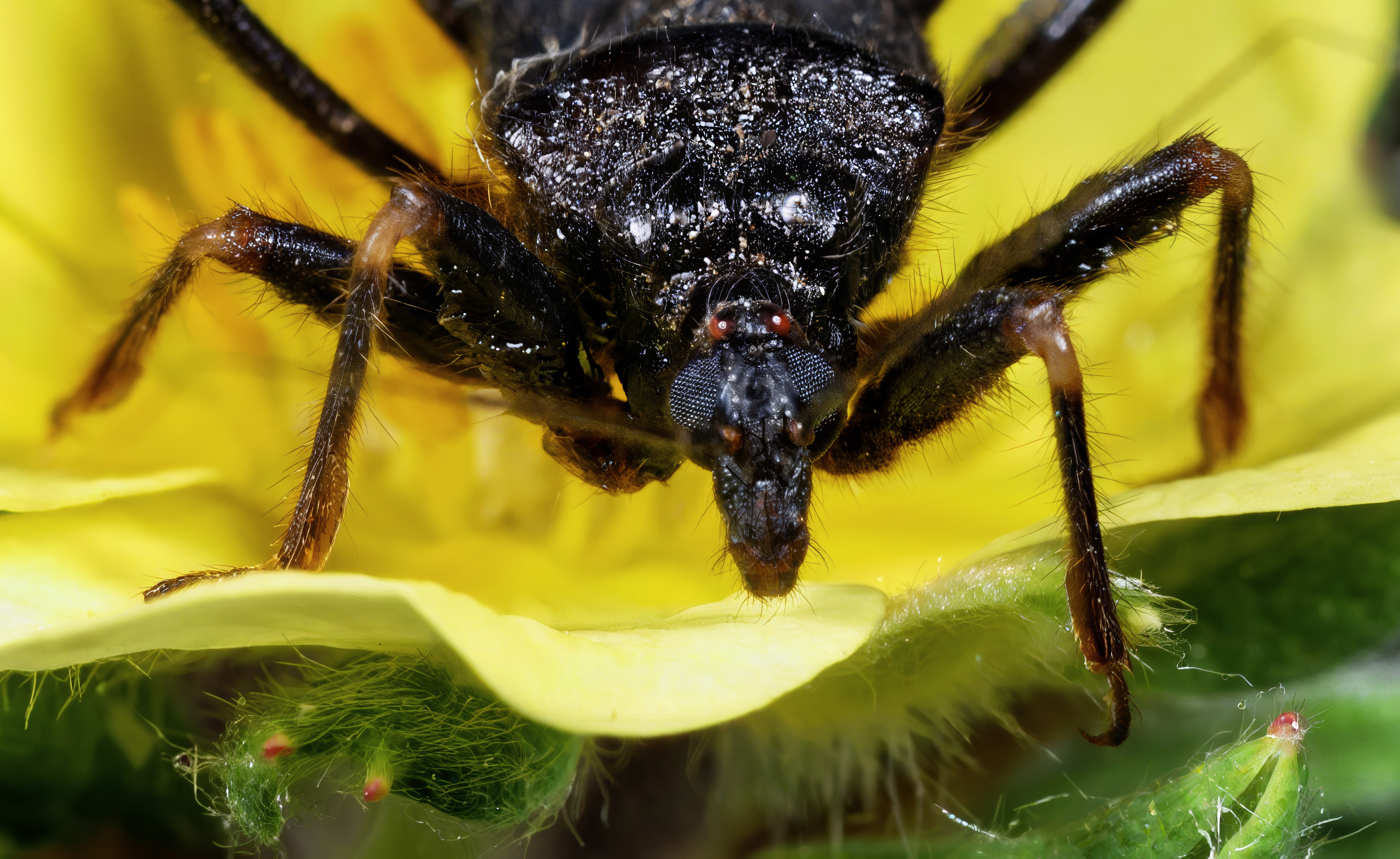
Portrait

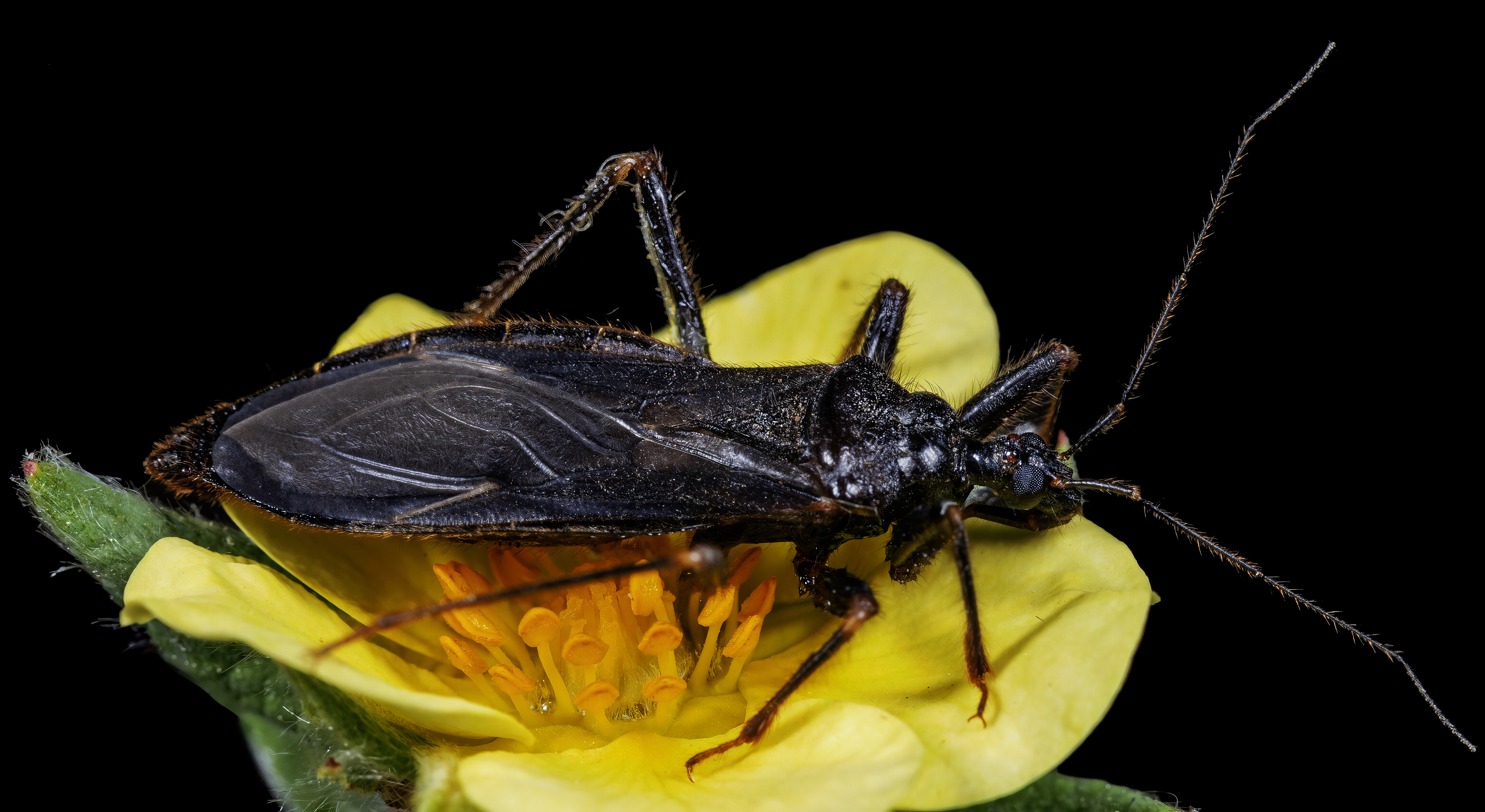
Profile view

== Natural history ==
=== Distribution ===
The masked hunter has a Holarctic distribution. It is native to Europe and western Asia, but has since been introduced to Australia, India, Africa, and North America. Masked hunters were likely introduced into North America accidentally in the late 1800s to early 1900s; they were first found in Canada in 1905 and in the United States in 1917, and are now common in the Central and Eastern United States.

=== Life cycle ===
Masked hunters, like other Hemiptera, undergo incomplete metamorphosis. Early stages of the lifecycle look like small adults and are called nymphs. Normally, one generation of masked hunter bugs occurs per year. Adults are common during midsummer, but can also be found in the winter.

=== Behavior ===
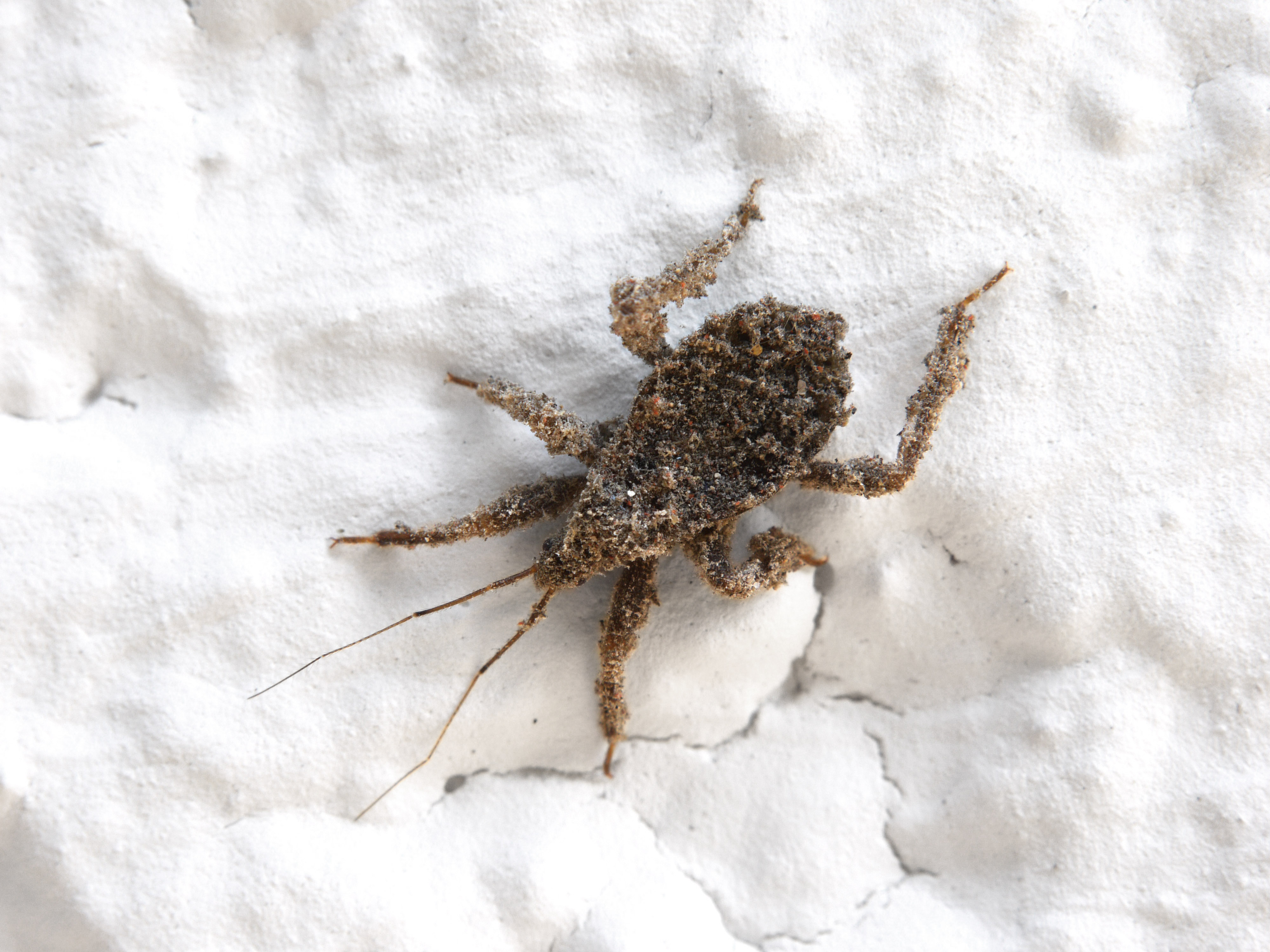
Nymph covered with sand

Nymphs of R. personatus use their hind legs and a tarsal fan to construct a camouflaging layer of substrate on their bodies. Two layers are formed, an inner layer of fine particles and an outer layer of coarser particles. The formation of these two layers may be the reason for the presence of long and short trichomes on the nymphs. Nymphs may use the serrated setae present on their abdomens to assist in loosening substrate for use in camouflage. The camouflage may assist the nymph in avoiding detection by both predators and prey. They hunt bed bugs at night, as well as other prey.

Both the nymphs and adults are predatory, feeding on various arthropods by piercing their bodies with sucking mouthparts.

Masked hunters prefer dry habitats and are usually only found in small numbers when they infest houses.

== Effects on humans ==
Masked hunters deliver a rostral stab comparable to a bee's sting when handled or trapped. The stab can cause swelling that lasts for about a week. Because they feed on a wide variety of arthropods, they sometimes are found in homes with bed bug infestations. They can generally be controlled by dealing with the bed bug infestation.
