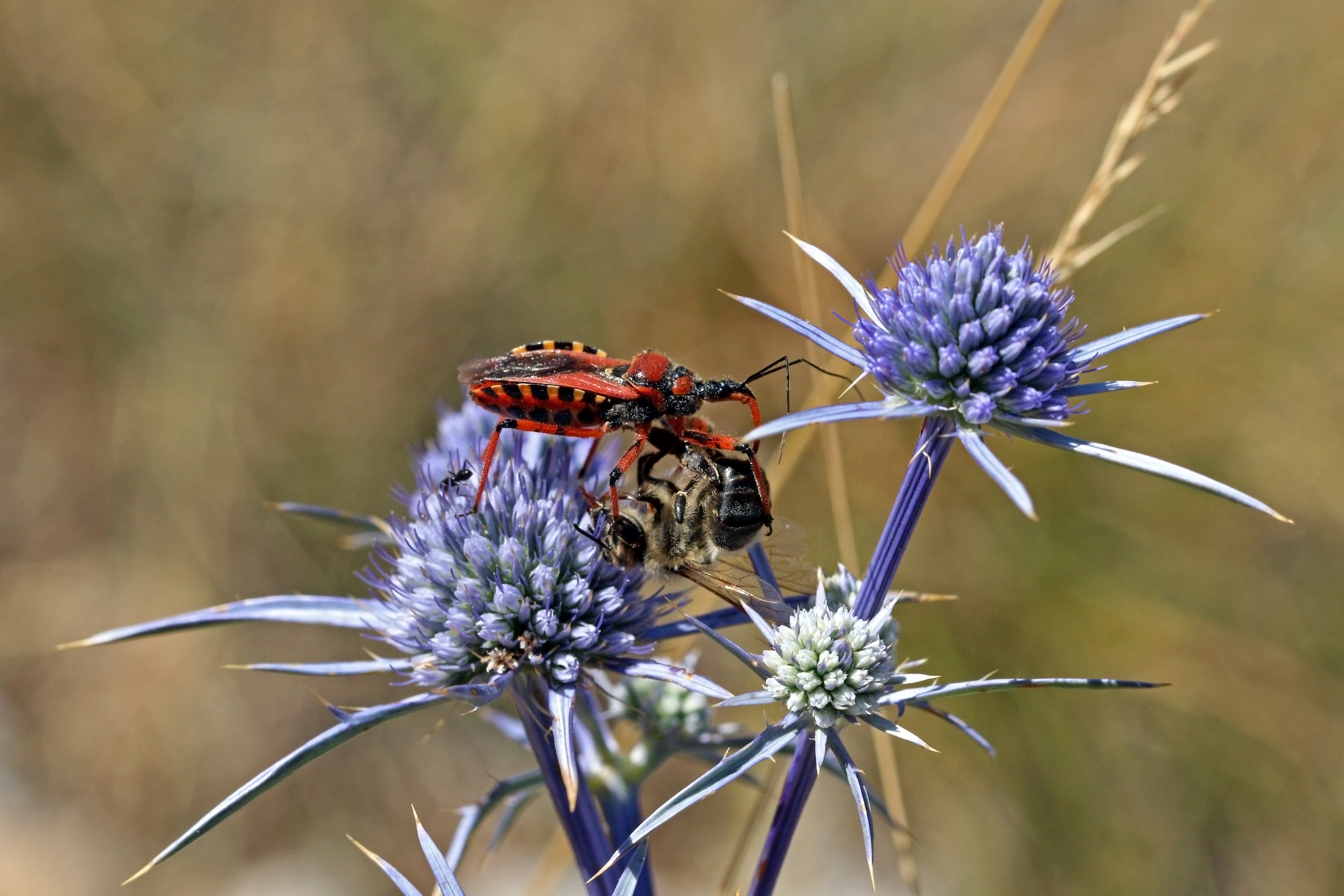
- Assassin bug (Rhynocoris iracundus) with bee prey

Scientific classification
- Kingdom: Animalia
- Phylum: Arthropoda
- Clade: Pancrustacea
- Class: Insecta
- Order: Hemiptera
- Suborder: Heteroptera
- Infraorder: Cimicomorpha
- Superfamily: Reduvioidea
- Family: Reduviidae; Latreille, 1807

Subfamilies
- Bactrodinae; Centrocnemidinae; Cetherinae; Chryxinae; Ectrichodiinae; Elasmodeminae; Emesinae; Microtominae (=Hammacerinae); Harpactorinae; Holoptilinae; Manangocorinae; Peiratinae; Phimophorinae; Phymatinae; Physoderinae; Pseudocetherinae; Reduviinae; Saicinae; Salyavatinae; Sphaeridopinae; Stenopodainae; Triatominae; Tribelocephalinae; Vesciinae; Visayanocorinae

= Reduviidae =

Reduviidae Temporal range: Barremian–Recent

Family of insects

The Reduviidae is a large cosmopolitan family of the suborder Heteroptera of the order Hemiptera (true bugs), commonly known as assassin bugs. Among the Hemiptera and together with the Nabidae almost all species are terrestrial ambush predators; most other predatory Hemiptera are aquatic. The main examples of non-predatory Reduviidae are some blood-sucking ectoparasites in the subfamily Triatominae, with a few species from South America noted for their ability to transmit Chagas disease. Though spectacular exceptions are known, most members of the family are fairly easily recognizable: they have a relatively narrow neck, sturdy build, and formidable curved proboscis (sometimes called a rostrum). Large specimens should be handled with caution, if at all, because they sometimes defend themselves with a very painful stab from the proboscis.

== Taxonomy ==
The family members are almost all predatory, except for a few blood-sucking species, some of which are important as disease vectors. About 7000 species have been described, in more than 20 recognized subfamilies, making it one of the largest families in the Hemiptera.

The name Reduviidae is derived from the type genus, Reduvius. That name, in turn, comes from the Latin reduvia, meaning "hangnail" or "remnant". Possibly this name was inspired by the lateral flanges on the abdomen of many species.

Common genera include:

- Lopodytes
- Melanolestes
- Platymeris
- Pselliopus
- Psyttala
- Rasahus
- Reduvius
- Rhiginia
- Sinea
- Zelus

While members of most subfamilies have no common names other than assassin bugs, some subfamilies have their own common names such as:

- Ambush bugs – subfamily Phymatinae
- Thread-legged bugs – subfamily Emesinae, including the genus Emesaya
- Kissing bugs (or cone-headed bugs) – subfamily Triatominae, unusual in that most species are blood-suckers and several are important disease vectors
- Wheel bugs – genus Arilus, including the common North American species Arilus cristatus
- Grass assassin bugs – genus Lopodytes

== Morphology ==
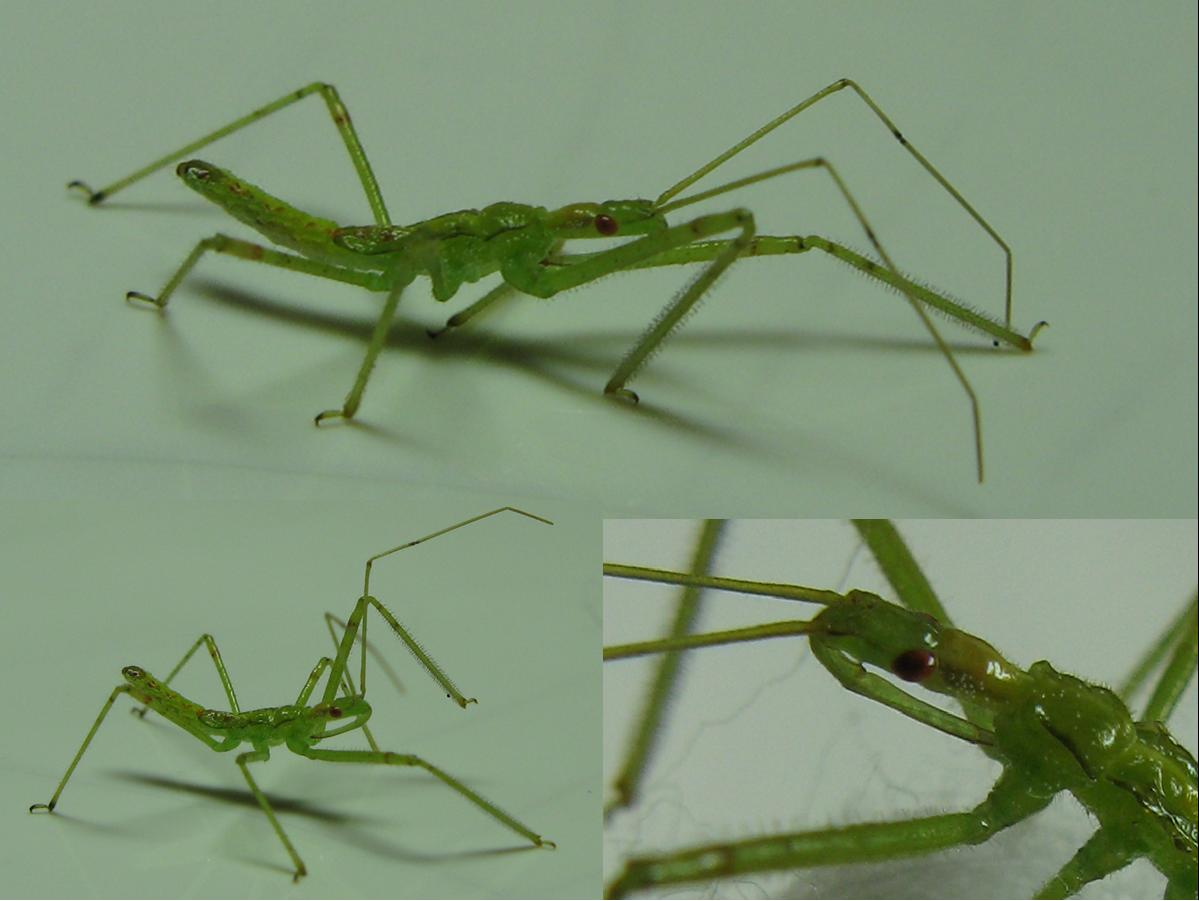
A Zelus nymph from the Southeastern United States

Adult insects range from roughly 12 to 36 mm (0.47 to 1.42 in), depending on the species. They most commonly have an elongated head with a distinct narrowed 'neck', long legs, and prominent, segmented, tubular mouthparts, most commonly called the proboscis, but termed by some authors the "rostrum". Most species are bright in colour with hues of brown, black, red, or orange.

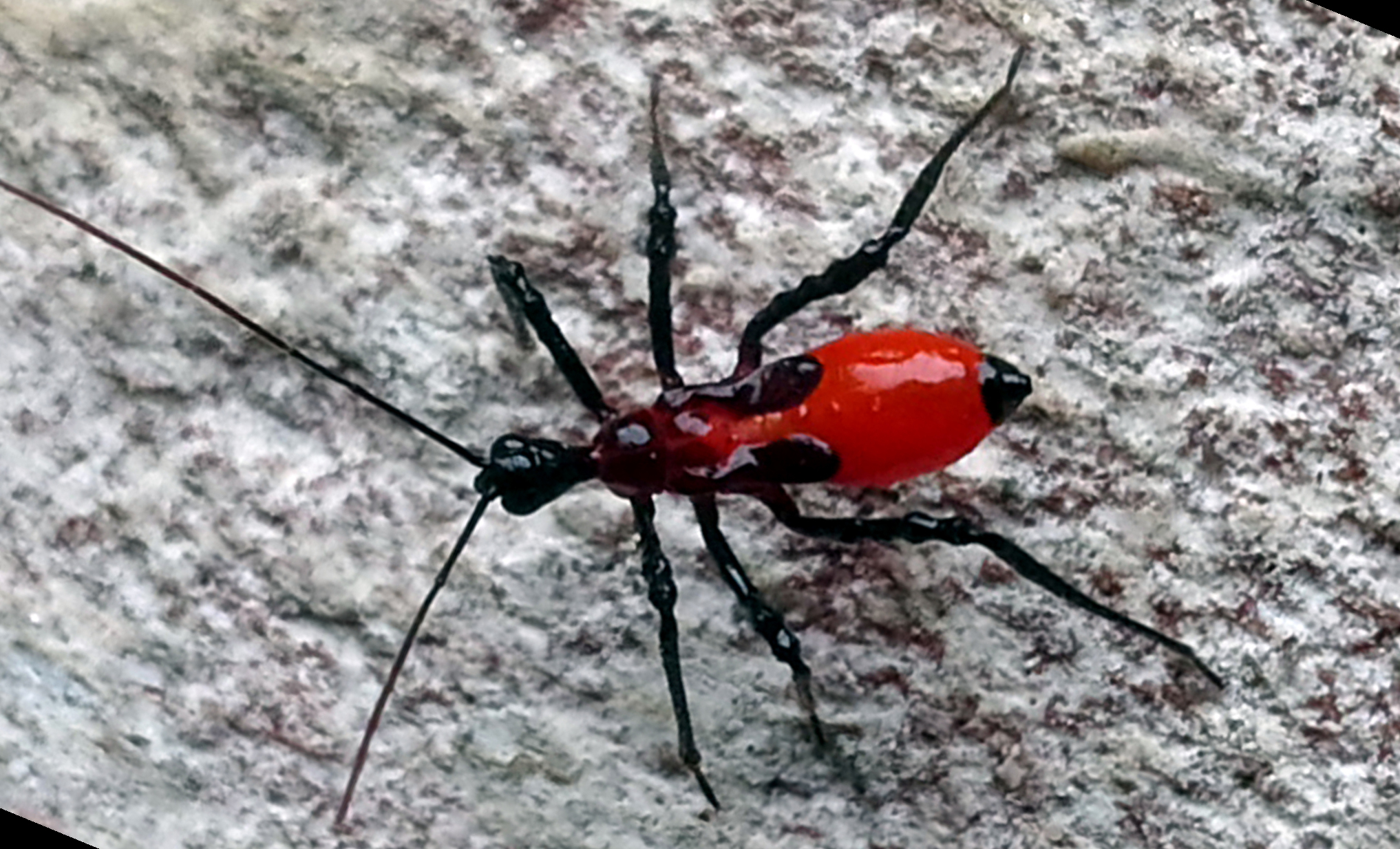
Nymph, found in Nepal

The most distinctive feature of the family is that the tip of the proboscis fits into a ridged groove in the prosternum, where it can be used to produce sound by stridulation. Sound is made by rasping the proboscis against ridges in this groove or stridulitrum (stridulatory organ). These sounds are often used to discourage predators. When harassed, many species can deliver a painful stab with the proboscis, injecting venom or digestive juices. The effects can be intensely painful and the injection from some species may be medically significant.

== Feeding ==
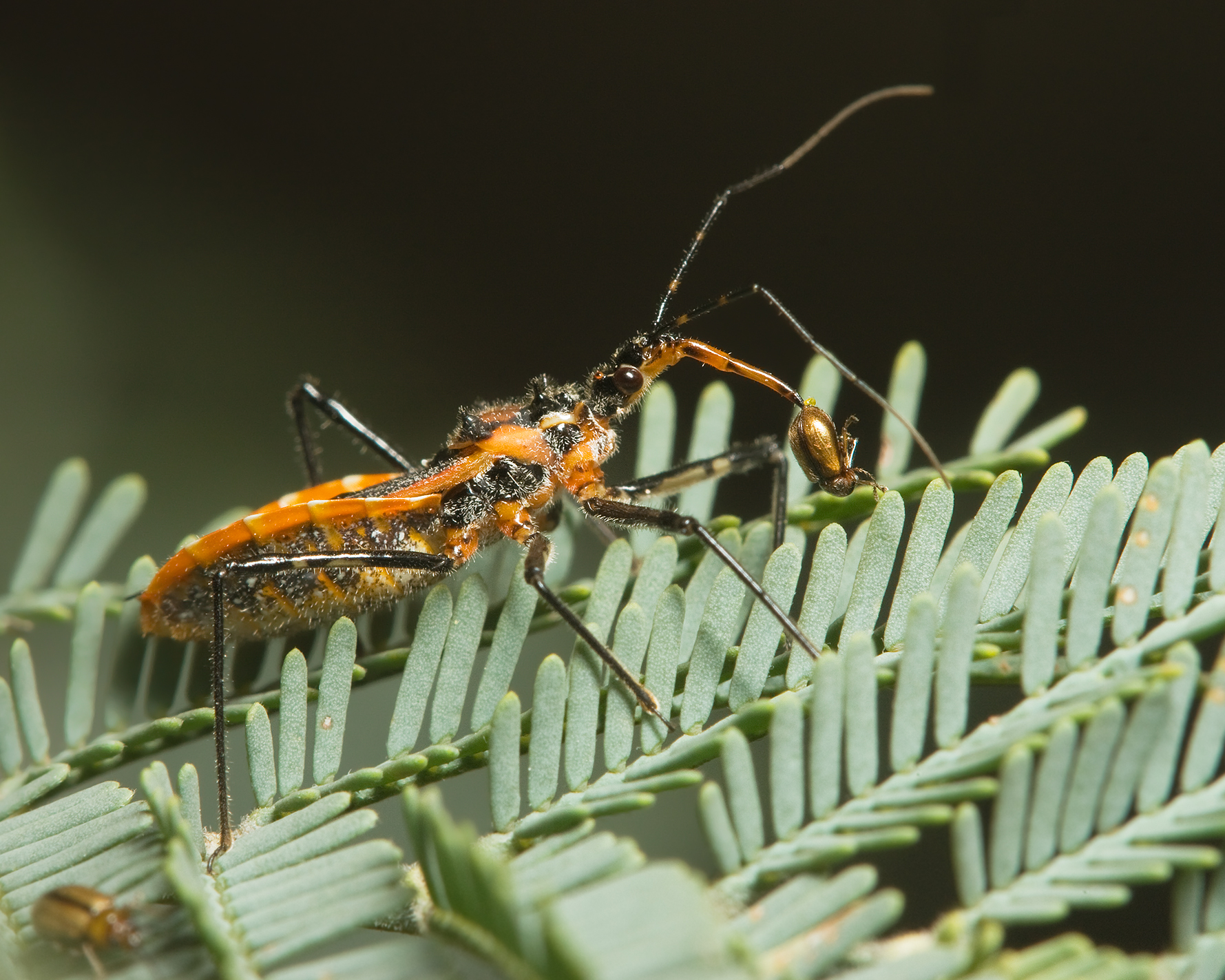
Orange assassin bug (Gminatus australis) feeding on a beetle

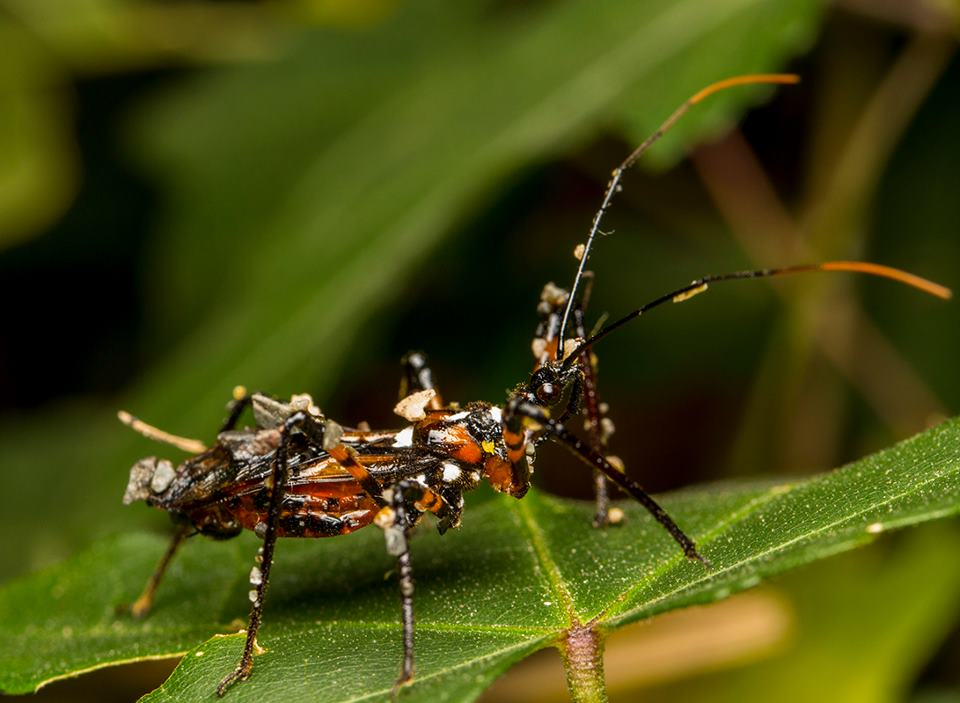
A reduviid camouflaged with debris, Australia

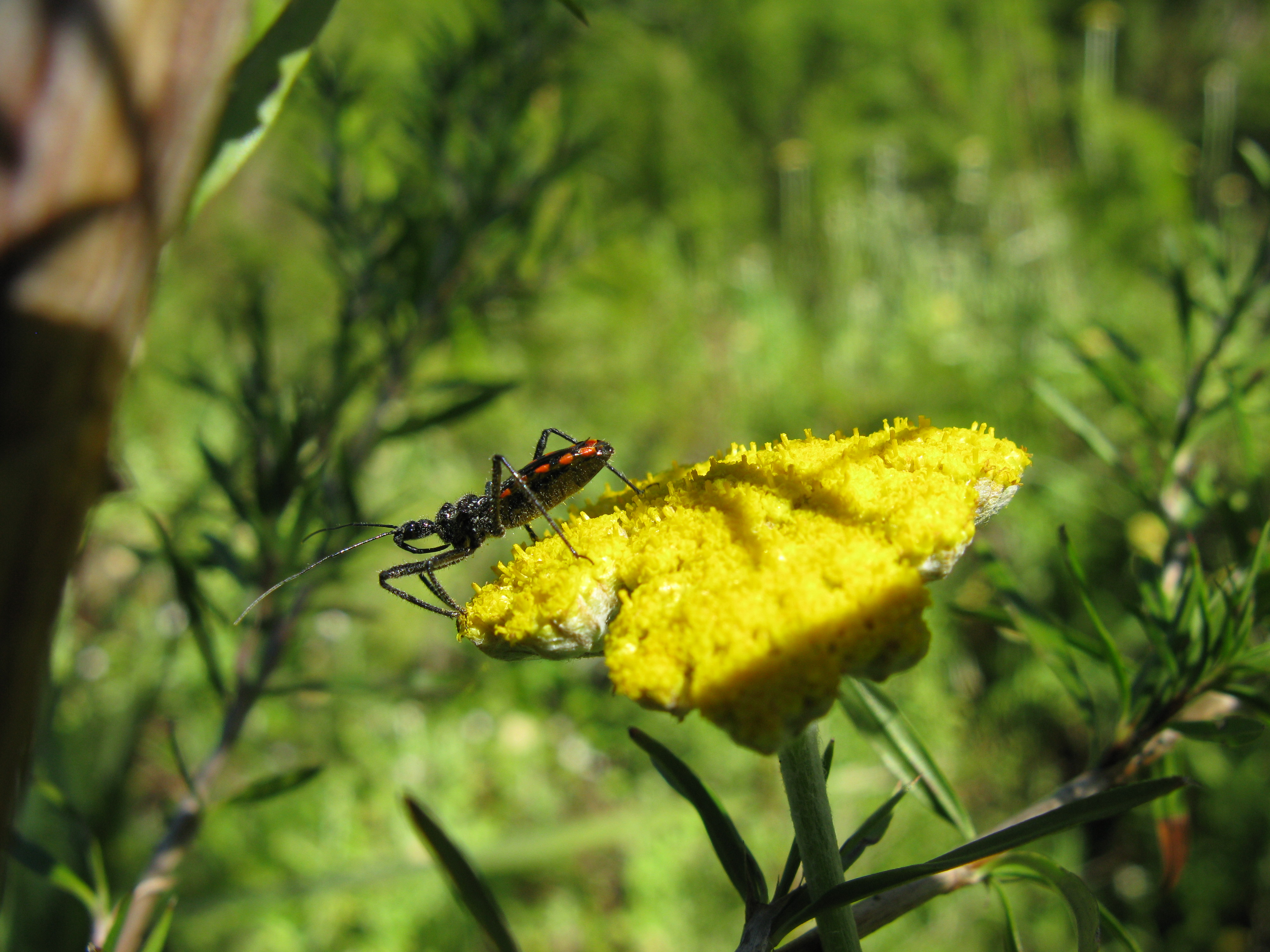
Rhynocoris – a predatory flower assassin bug from South Africa, it may bite when carelessly handled, and painful aftereffects often persist for months.

Predatory Reduviidae use the long rostrum to inject a lethal saliva that liquefies the insides of the prey, which are then sucked out. The saliva contains enzymes that digest the tissues they swallow. This process is generally referred to as extraoral digestion. The saliva is commonly effective at killing prey substantially larger than the bug itself.

The legs of some Reduviidae have areas covered in tiny hairs that aid in holding onto their prey while they feed. Others, members of the subfamily Phymatinae in particular, have forelegs that resemble those of the praying mantis, and they catch and hold their prey in a similar way to mantises.

As nymphs, some species cover and camouflage themselves effectively with debris or the remains of dead prey insects. The nymphal instars of the species Acanthaspis pedestris present one good example of this behaviour where they occur in Tamil Nadu in India. Another well-known species is Reduvius personatus, known as the masked hunter because of its habit of camouflaging itself with dust. Some species tend to feed on pests such as cockroaches or bedbugs and are accordingly popular in regions where people regard their hunting as beneficial. Reduvius personatus is an example, and some people breed them as pets and for pest control. Some assassin bug subfamilies are adapted to hunting certain types of prey; for example, the Ectrichodiinae eat millipedes, and feather-legged bugs eat ants. A spectacular example of the latter is Ptilocnemus lemur, an Australian species in which the adult attacks and eats ants, but the nymph waits until the ant bites the feathery tufts on its hind legs, upon which it whips around and pierces the ant's head with its proboscis, and proceeds to feed.

Some research on the nature of the venom from certain Reduviidae is under way. The saliva of Rhynocoris marginatus showed some insecticidal activity in vitro, in tests on lepidopteran pests. The effects included reduction of food consumption, assimilation, and use. Its antiaggregation factors also affected the aggregation and mobility of haemocytes.

The saliva of the species Rhynocoris marginatus (Fab.) and Catamirus brevipennis (Servile) have been studied because of their activity against human pathogenic Gram-negative bacteria (including strains of Escherichia coli, Pseudomonas aeruginosa, Proteus vulgaris, and Salmonella typhimurium) and the Gram-positive Streptococcus pyogenes.

Some species are bloodsuckers rather than predators, and they are accordingly far less welcome to humans. The blood-feeding habit is thought to have evolved from species that lived in the nests of mammalian hosts. Several species are known to live among bat roosts, including Cavernicola pilosa, Triatoma dimidiata and Eratyrus mucronatus. Triatoma species and other members of the subfamily Triatominae, such as Rhodnius species, Panstrongylus megistus, and Paratriatoma hirsuta, are known as kissing bugs, because they tend to bite sleeping humans in the soft tissue around the lips and eyes. A more serious problem than their bites is the fact that several of these haematophagous Central and South American species transmit the potentially fatal trypanosomal Chagas disease, sometimes called American trypanosomiasis. This results in the death of 12,000 people a year.

The Emesinae live among spider webs.

== Phylogeny and evolutionary history ==
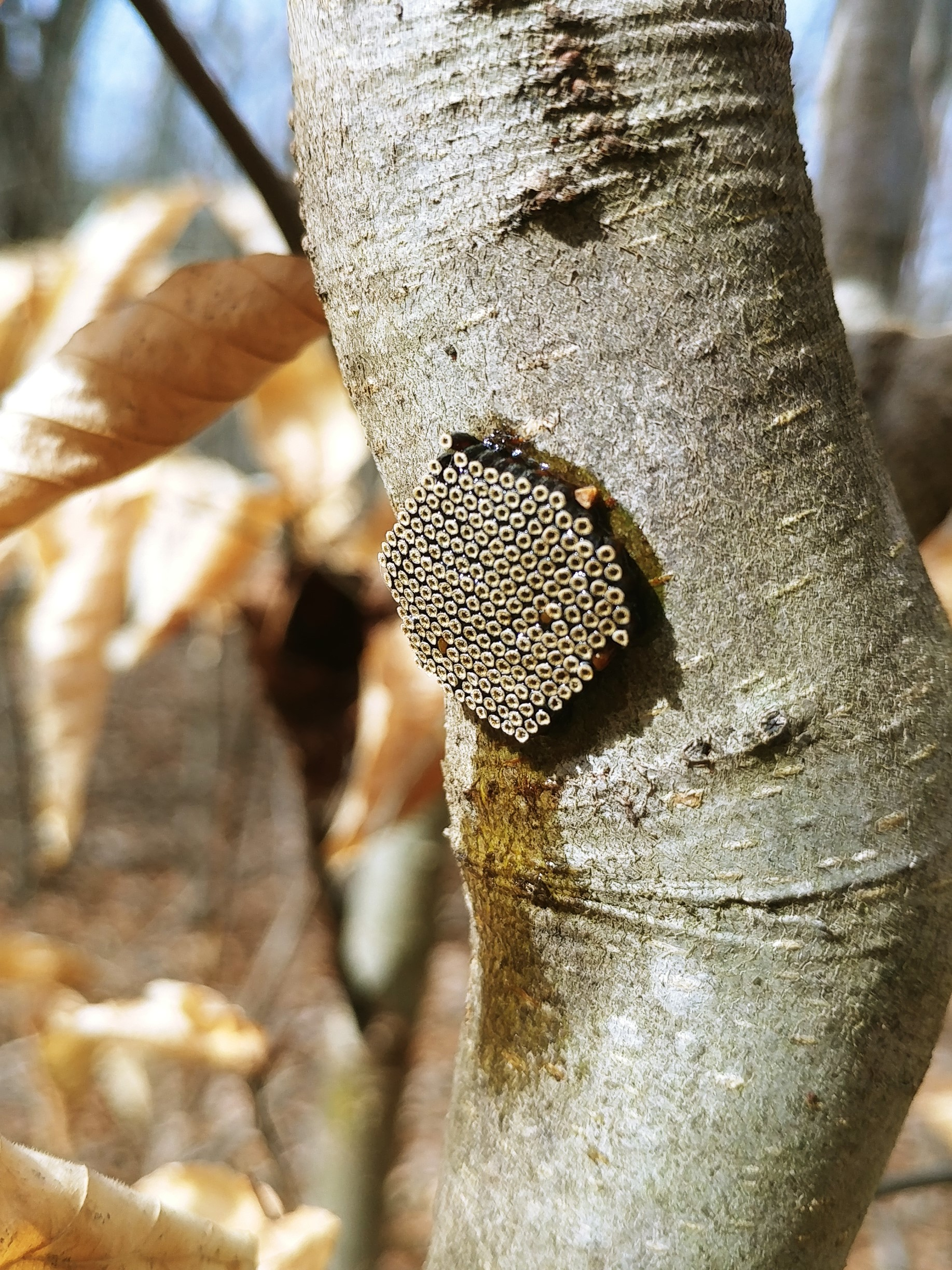
Arilus cristatus egg mass

Current taxonomy is based on morphological characteristics. The first cladistic analysis based on molecular data (mitochondrial and nuclear ribosomal DNA) was published in 2009 and called into question the monophyly of some current groups, such as the Emesinae. Reduviidae are monophyletic, and the "Phymatine Complex" is consistently recovered as the sister to the higher Reduviidae, which includes 90 percent of the reduviid species diversity. Reduviidae is suggested to have split from other Cimicomorphs during the Jurassic, based on molecular clock. The oldest fossils of the family are from the Lower Cretaceous (Barremian) aged Yixian Formation, represented by the genus Simplicivenius, belonging to the subfamily Reduviinae.
