= Bagauda (disambiguation) =

Bagauda may refer to the following.

- Bagauda, the first monarch of the Kingdom of Kano
- Bagauda Dynasty of Kano
- Bagauda, a genus of thread-legged bugs
- Bagauda, Nepal, a village development committee (VDC) in Nepal
- Bagaudae, rural resistance fighters in the late western Roman Empire
