= Emesopsis streiti =

Scientific classification
- Domain: Eukaryota
- Kingdom: Animalia
- Phylum: Arthropoda
- Class: Insecta
- Order: Hemiptera
- Suborder: Heteroptera
- Family: Reduviidae
- Subfamily: Emesinae
- Tribe: Ploiariolini
- Genus: Emesopsis
- Species: E. streiti

Binomial name
- Emesopsis streiti Kovac and Yang, 1995.

Species of true bug

Emesopsis streiti is a species of Emesinae described from Malaysia.

Emesopsis streiti was found of decaying bamboo culms of Gigantochloa scortechinii. The species preyed upon a wide variety of insect and arthropod groups. E. streiti is apparently preyed upon by theridiid spiders.

== Etymology ==
This species is named in honour of the Swiss ecologist Prof. Bruno Streit.
