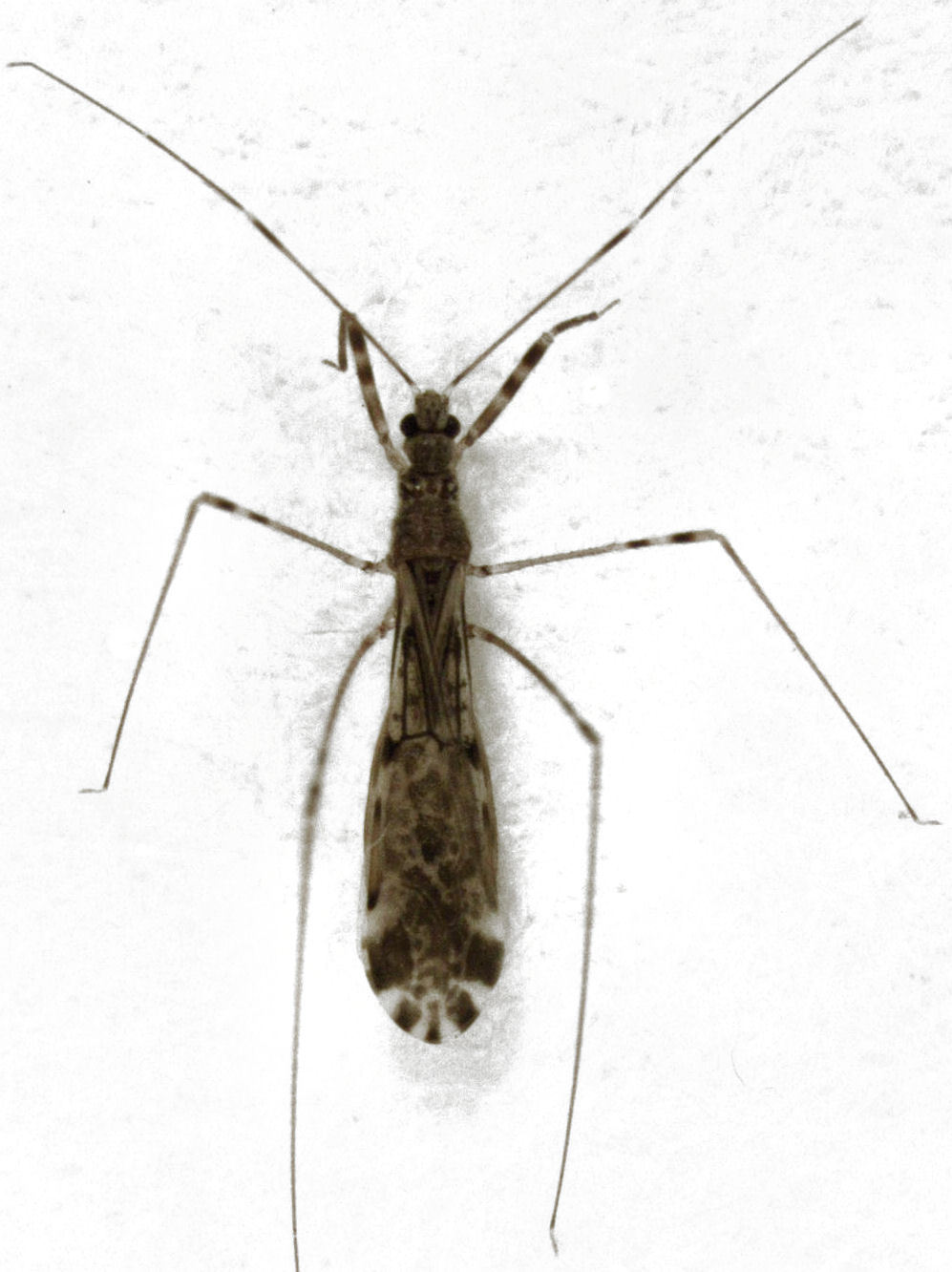
- Emesopsis infenestra

Scientific classification
- Domain: Eukaryota
- Kingdom: Animalia
- Phylum: Arthropoda
- Class: Insecta
- Order: Hemiptera
- Suborder: Heteroptera
- Family: Reduviidae
- Subfamily: Emesinae
- Tribe: Ploiariolini
- Genus: Emesopsis
- Species: E. infenestra

Binomial name
- Emesopsis infenestra Tatarnic, Wall & Cassis, 2011

= Emesopsis infenestra =

Species of insect

Emesopsis infenestra is a species of assassin bug.

== Distribution ==
The species has been found in Australia, the Loyalty Islands and New Zealand.
