= Ploiaria aptera =

Scientific classification
- Domain: Eukaryota
- Kingdom: Animalia
- Phylum: Arthropoda
- Class: Insecta
- Order: Hemiptera
- Suborder: Heteroptera
- Family: Reduviidae
- Tribe: Leistarchini
- Genus: Ploiaria
- Species: P. aptera

Binomial name
- Ploiaria aptera McAtee & Malloch, 1925

Species of true bug

Ploiaria aptera is a species of thread-legged bug in the family Reduviidae. It is found in North America.
