= Bagauda zigzag =

Scientific classification
- Domain: Eukaryota
- Kingdom: Animalia
- Phylum: Arthropoda
- Class: Insecta
- Order: Hemiptera
- Suborder: Heteroptera
- Family: Reduviidae
- Genus: Bagauda
- Species: B. zigzag

Binomial name
- Bagauda zigzag Rédei & Tsai, 2010

Species of true bug

Bagauda zigzag is a species of assassin bug discovered in Taiwan in 2007 in an area of uplifted coral reef forest. One individual was observed to prey upon a spider. The species is nocturnal and individuals were most commonly found on Chinese banyan (Ficus microcarpa L.) and King fig (Ficus ampelos Burm.f.) (Moraceae).
