= Empicoris winnemana =

Scientific classification
- Domain: Eukaryota
- Kingdom: Animalia
- Phylum: Arthropoda
- Class: Insecta
- Order: Hemiptera
- Suborder: Heteroptera
- Family: Reduviidae
- Genus: Empicoris
- Species: E. winnemana

Binomial name
- Empicoris winnemana Mcatee & Malloch, 1925

Species of true bug

Empicoris winnemana is a species of thread-legged bug in the family Reduviidae. It is found in North America.
