= Empicoris subparallelus =

Scientific classification
- Domain: Eukaryota
- Kingdom: Animalia
- Phylum: Arthropoda
- Class: Insecta
- Order: Hemiptera
- Suborder: Heteroptera
- Family: Reduviidae
- Genus: Empicoris
- Species: E. subparallelus

Binomial name
- Empicoris subparallelus McAtee & Malloch, 1925

Species of true bug

Empicoris subparallelus is a species of thread-legged bug found in Cuba and from two Southern US States (Florida and Texas).

== Florida record ==
Empicoris subparallelus was first reported in Florida from light traps set to monitor for mosquitoes in the Florida Keys in 2007. E. subparallelus may prey upon mosquito adults or larvae, although it has never been reported to do so. One Tunisian species of Ploiaria has been proposed as a biocontrol agent for Phlebotomus sand flies and mosquitoes.
