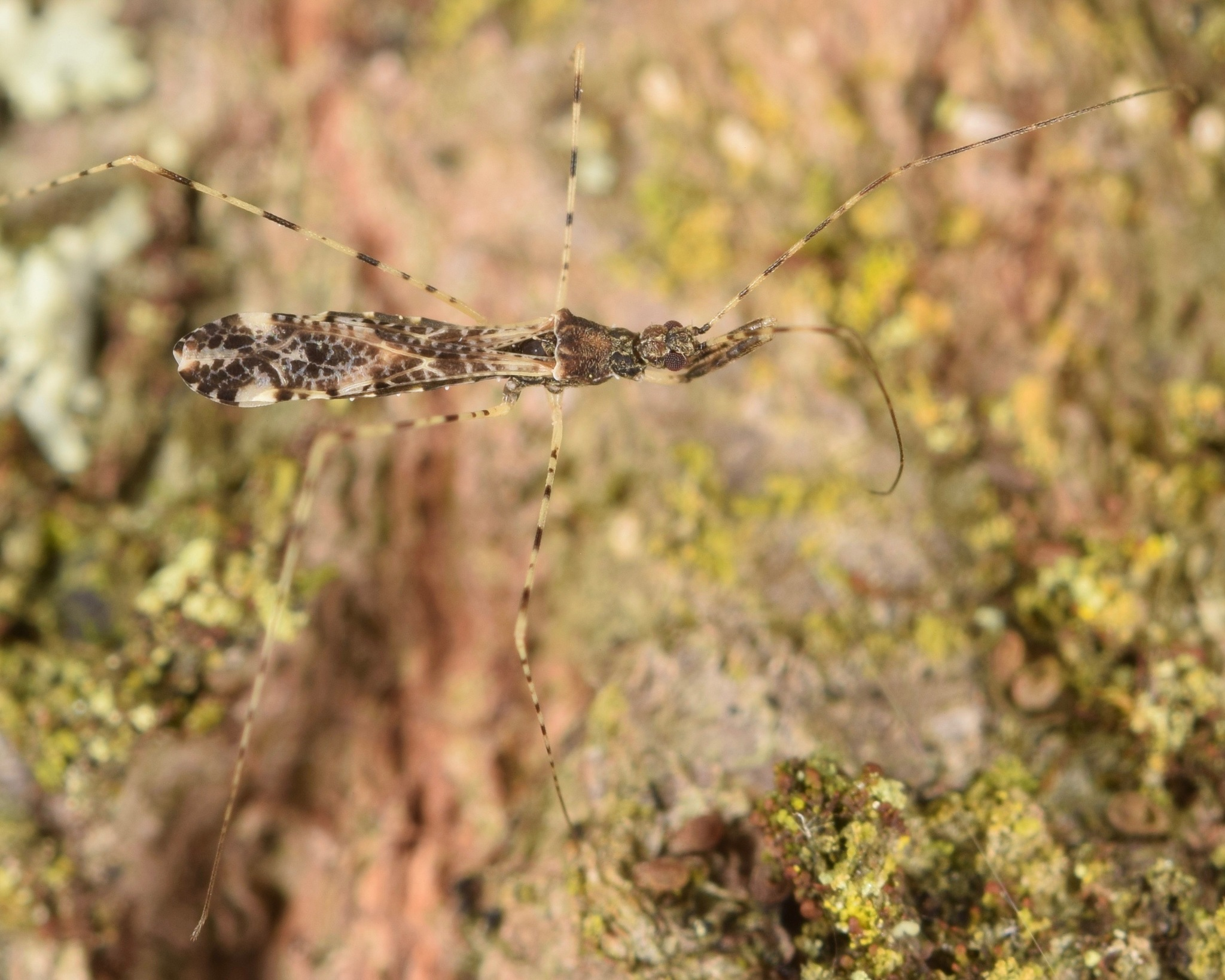
- Empicoris errabundus, Georgia, USA

Scientific classification
- Domain: Eukaryota
- Kingdom: Animalia
- Phylum: Arthropoda
- Class: Insecta
- Order: Hemiptera
- Suborder: Heteroptera
- Family: Reduviidae
- Genus: Empicoris
- Species: E. errabundus

Binomial name
- Empicoris errabundus (Say, 1832)

= Empicoris errabundus =

Species of true bug

Empicoris errabundus is a species of thread-legged bug in the family Reduviidae. It is found in the Caribbean, Central America, and North America.
