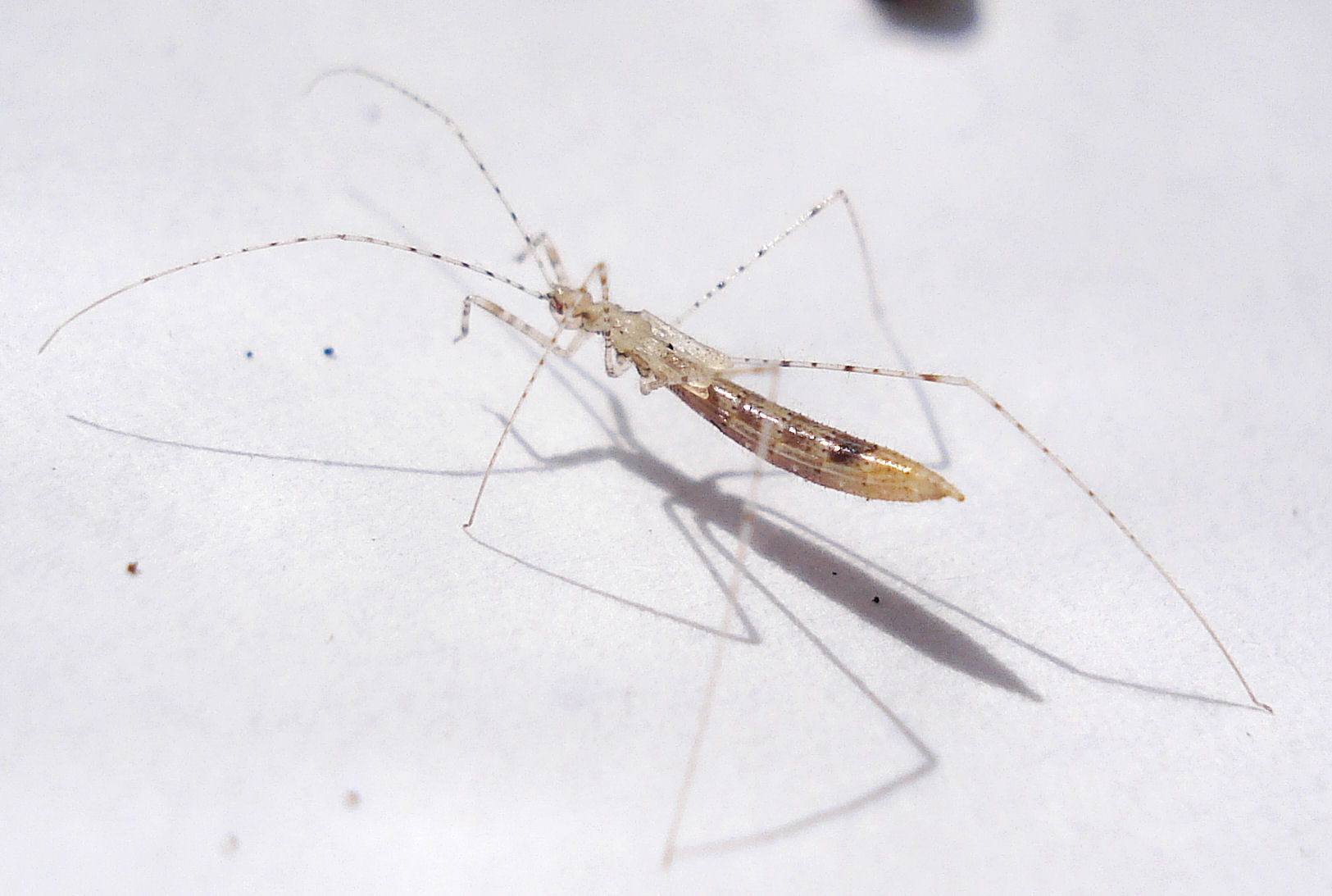
- Empicoris vagabundus nymph

Scientific classification
- Kingdom: Animalia
- Phylum: Arthropoda
- Class: Insecta
- Order: Hemiptera
- Suborder: Heteroptera
- Family: Reduviidae
- Genus: Empicoris
- Species: E. vagabundus

Binomial name
- Empicoris vagabundus (Linnaeus, 1758)

Synonyms
- Cimex vagabundus Linnaeus, 1758

= Empicoris vagabundus =

Species of true bug

Empicoris vagabundus is a species of thread-legged bug in the family Reduviidae. It occurs in Europe, much of Asia, and the Americas.

Empicoris vagabundus measure 6–7 mm (0.24–0.28 in). It inhabits deciduous trees, where it hunts for prey such as barklice.
