= Proguithera =

Scientific classification
- Domain: Eukaryota
- Kingdom: Animalia
- Phylum: Arthropoda
- Class: Insecta
- Order: Hemiptera
- Suborder: Heteroptera
- Family: Reduviidae
- Tribe: Leistarchini
- Genus: Proguithera; Wygodzinsky, 1966

Species
- See text

Synonyms
- Guithera (Proguithera) Wygodzinsky, 1966

Genus of true bugs

Proguithera is a genus of thread-legged bug in the Emesinae. This genus forms a group with two other genera, Guithera and Lutevula. The relationship between the group is unclear at the moment.

== Species list ==
- Proguithera caspersi Chen, Li & Cai, 2021
- Proguithera drescheri (Wygodzinsky, 1966)
- Proguithera inexpectata Rédei, 2004
- Proguithera kiinugama Ishikawa & Naka, 2016
