= Bagauda zetteli =

Scientific classification
- Domain: Eukaryota
- Kingdom: Animalia
- Phylum: Arthropoda
- Class: Insecta
- Order: Hemiptera
- Suborder: Heteroptera
- Family: Reduviidae
- Genus: Bagauda
- Species: B. zetteli

Binomial name
- Bagauda zetteli Redei, 2005

Species of true bug

Bagauda zetteli is a species of assassin bug in the subfamily Emesinae found in Borneo. The species was described in 2005 and was found near the entrance to a cave.
