= SAICA =

SAICA may refer to:

- South African Institute of Chartered Accountants, a non-profit association
- Sociedades anónimas inscrito de capital abierto, a type of company in Argentina
- Succinylaminoimidazolecarboxamide riboside (SAICA riboside), a molecule whose appearance is characteristic of the disease adenylosuccinate lyase deficiency

Saica may refer to:

- Saica (bug), a genus of bugs in the family Reduviidae
