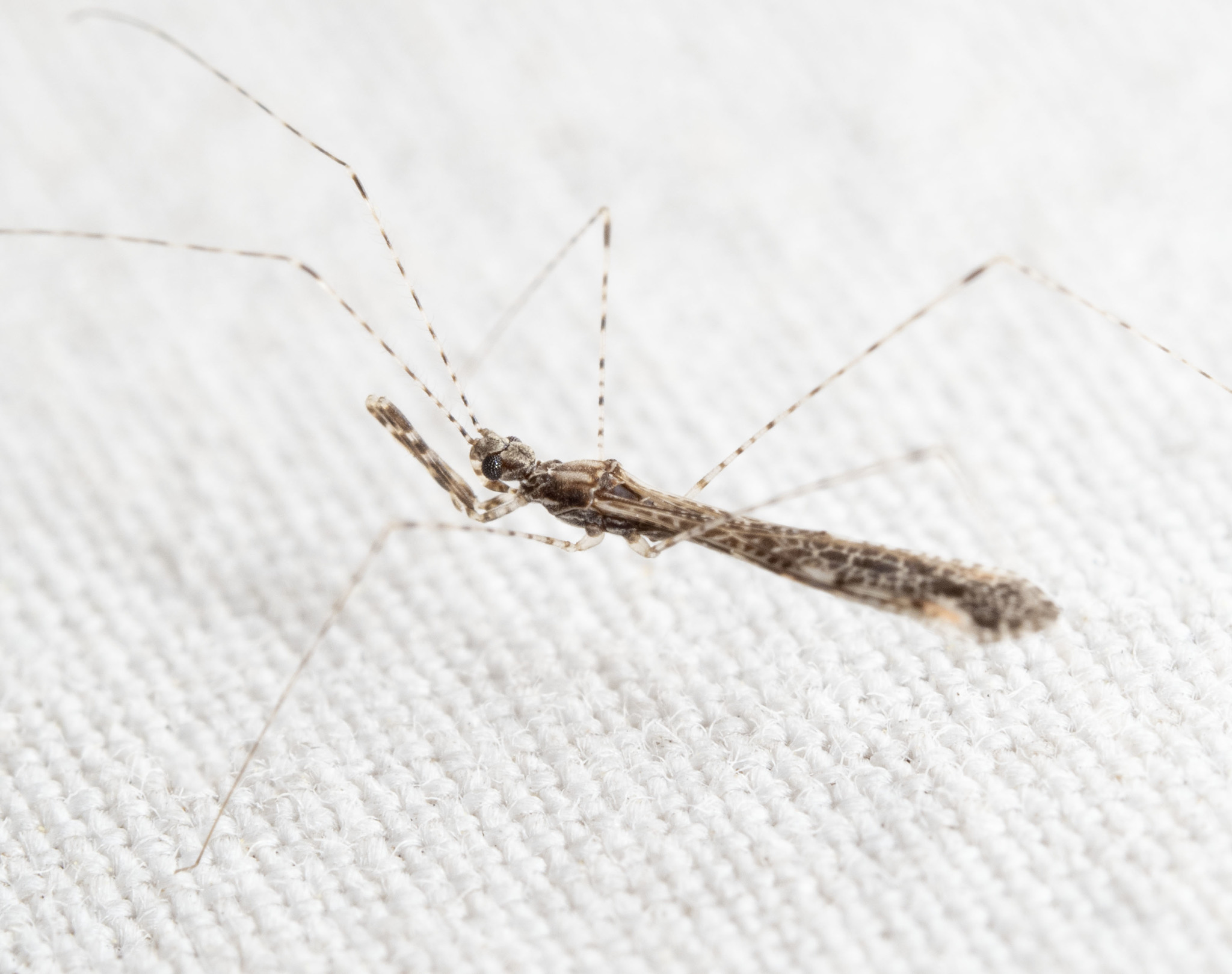

Scientific classification
- Kingdom: Animalia
- Phylum: Arthropoda
- Clade: Pancrustacea
- Class: Insecta
- Order: Hemiptera
- Suborder: Heteroptera
- Family: Reduviidae
- Genus: Empicoris
- Species: E. orthoneuron

Binomial name
- Empicoris orthoneuron Mcatee & Malloch, 1925

= Empicoris orthoneuron =

Species of true bug

Empicoris orthoneuron is a species of thread-legged bug in the family Reduviidae. It is found in Central America, North America, and South America.
