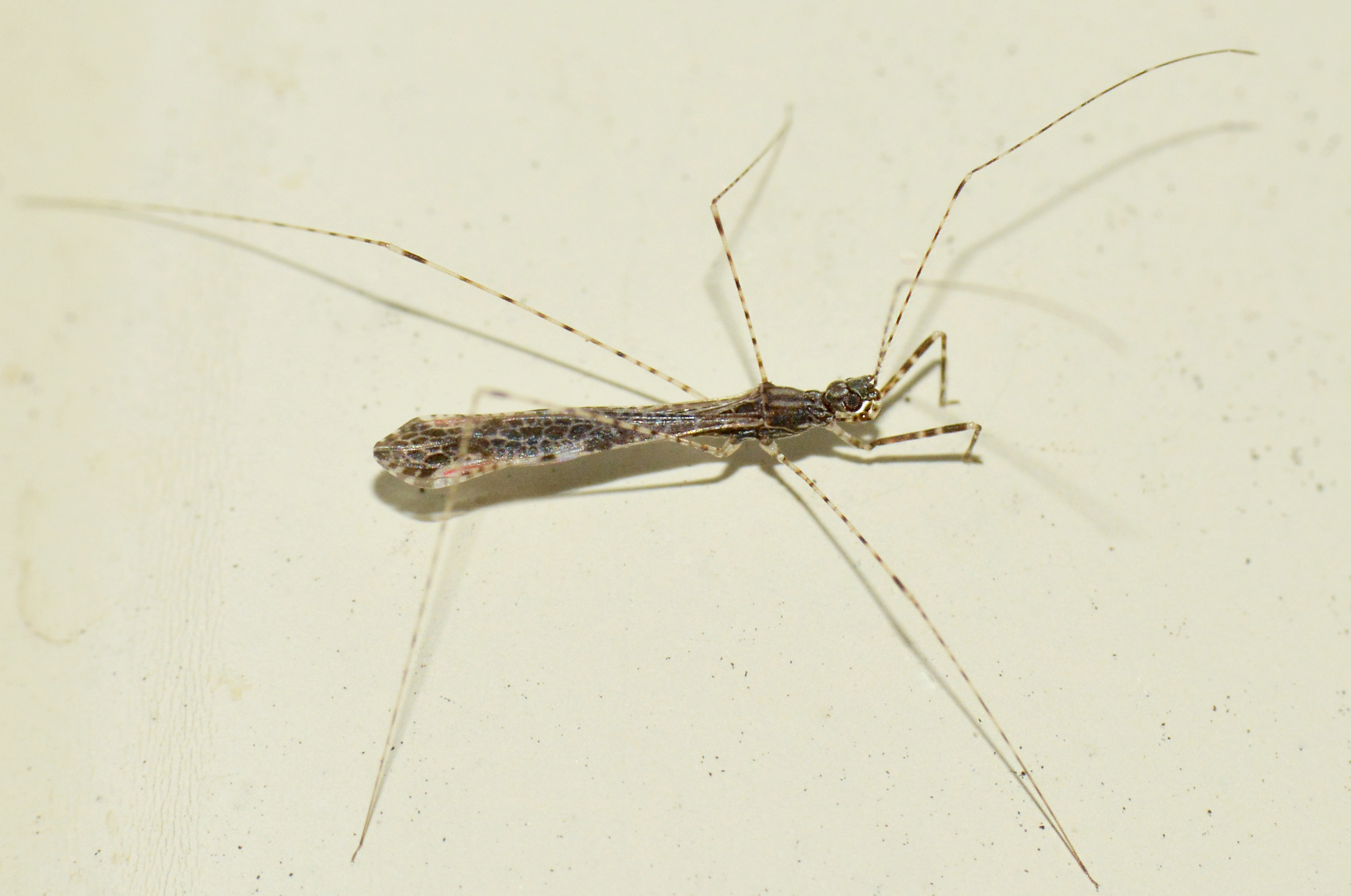
- Empicoris rubromaculatus

Scientific classification
- Kingdom: Animalia
- Phylum: Arthropoda
- Class: Insecta
- Order: Hemiptera
- Suborder: Heteroptera
- Family: Reduviidae
- Subfamily: Emesinae
- Tribe: Ploiariolini
- Genus: Empicoris; Wolff, 1811

= Empicoris =

Genus of true bugs

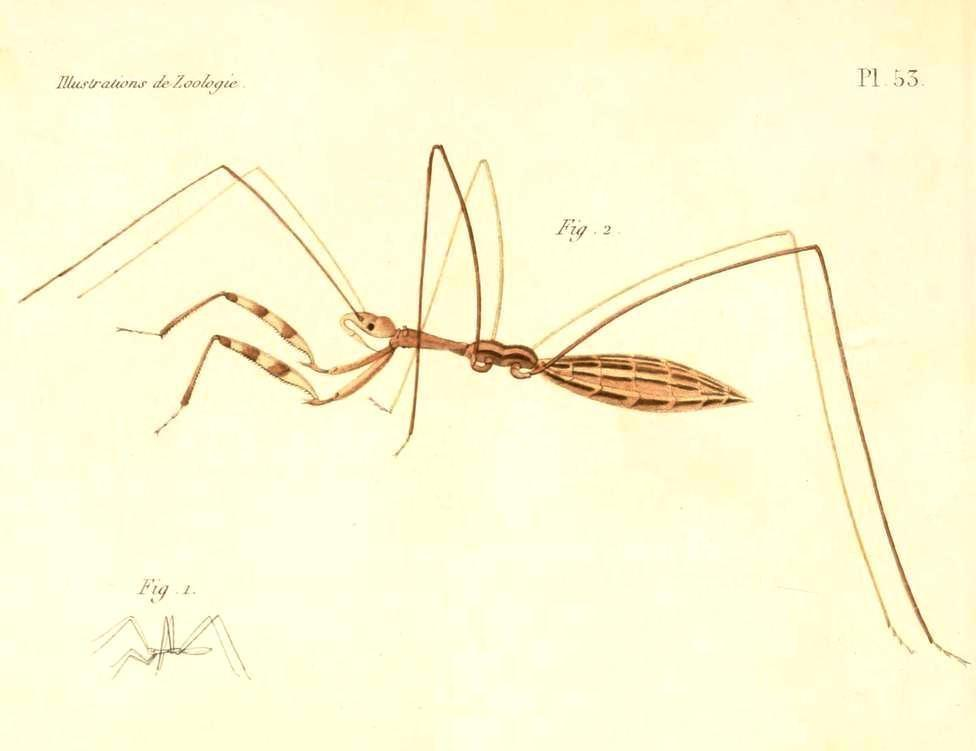
Empicoris vagabundus

Empicoris is a cosmopolitan genus of thread-legged bug (Emesinae). Numerous species have been described.

== Species ==
These 18 species belong to the genus Empicoris:

- Empicoris armatus (Champion, 1898)
- Empicoris barberi (McAtee and Malloch, 1923)
- Empicoris culiciformis (De Geer, 1773)
- Empicoris errabundus (Say, 1832)
- Empicoris incredibilis Wygodzinsky, 1966
- Empicoris minutus Usinger, 1946
- Empicoris nudus McAtee and Malloch, 1925
- Empicoris orthoneuron Mcatee & Malloch, 1925
- Empicoris palmensis Blatchley, 1926
- Empicoris parshleyi (Bergroth, 1922)
- Empicoris pilosus (Fieber, 1861)
- Empicoris pulcher (Blackburn, 1888)
- Empicoris rubromaculatus (Blackburn, 1888) (thread bug)
- Empicoris seorsus Bergroth, 1926
- Empicoris subparallelus McAtee and Malloch, 1925
- Empicoris vagabundus (Linnaeus, 1758)
- Empicoris whitei (Blackburn, 1881)
- Empicoris winnemana Mcatee & Malloch, 1925
