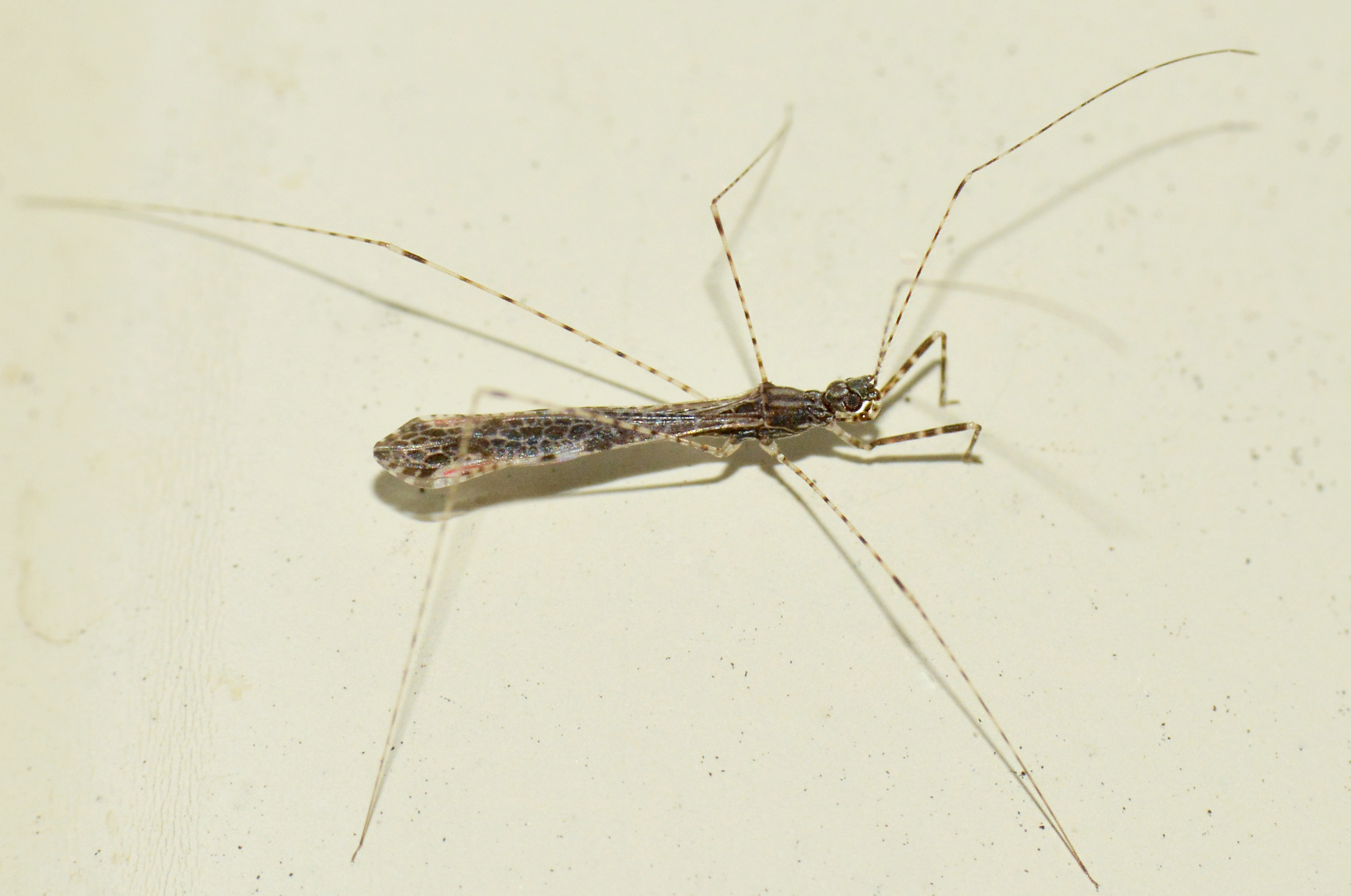

Scientific classification
- Domain: Eukaryota
- Kingdom: Animalia
- Phylum: Arthropoda
- Class: Insecta
- Order: Hemiptera
- Suborder: Heteroptera
- Family: Reduviidae
- Genus: Empicoris
- Species: E. rubromaculatus

Binomial name
- Empicoris rubromaculatus (Blackburn, 1888)

= Empicoris rubromaculatus =

Species of true bug

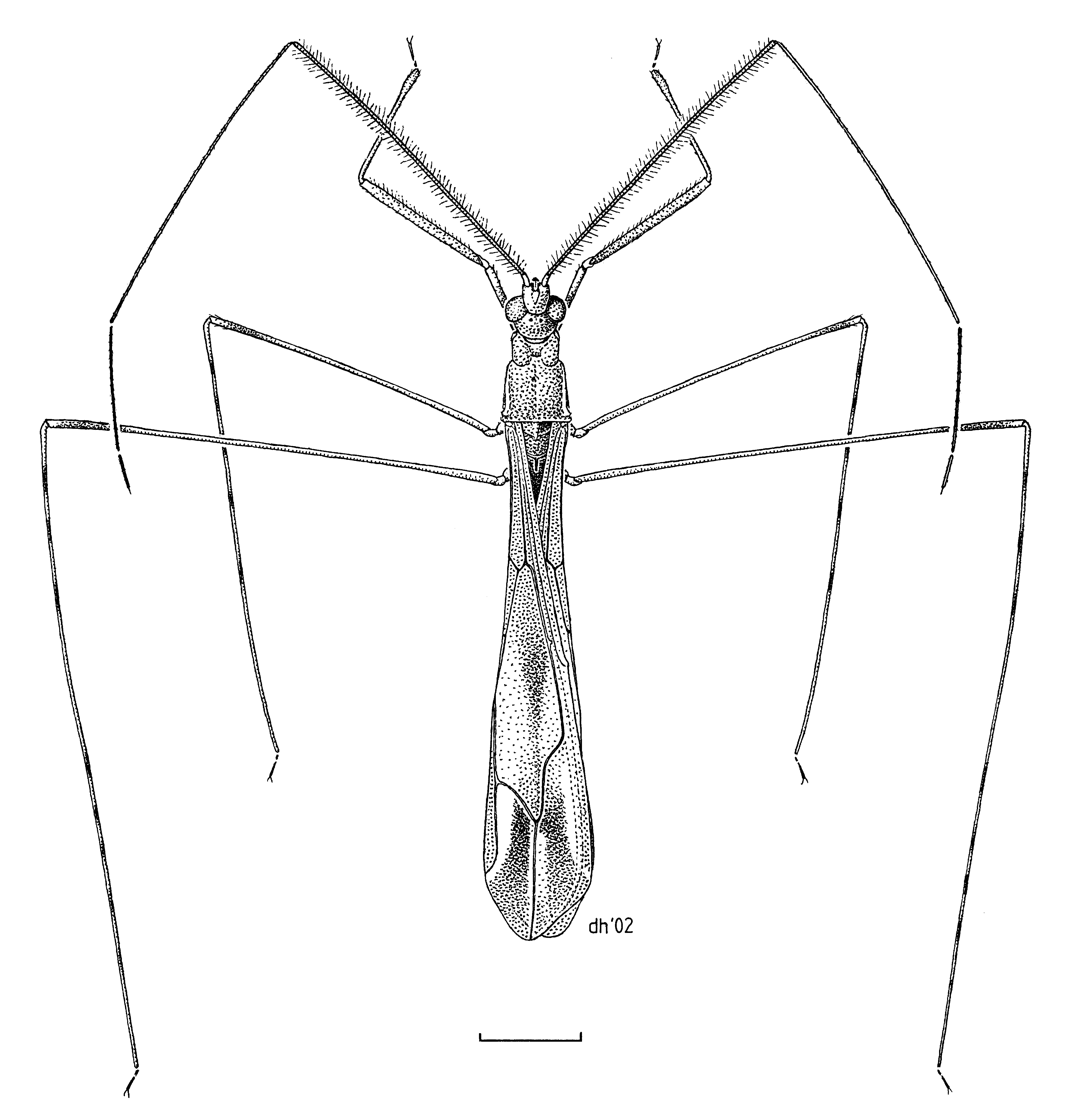
Empicoris rubromaculatus illustrated by Des Helmore

Empicoris rubromaculatus, the thread bug, is a species of thread-legged bug in the family Reduviidae. It is found in North America and Oceania.
