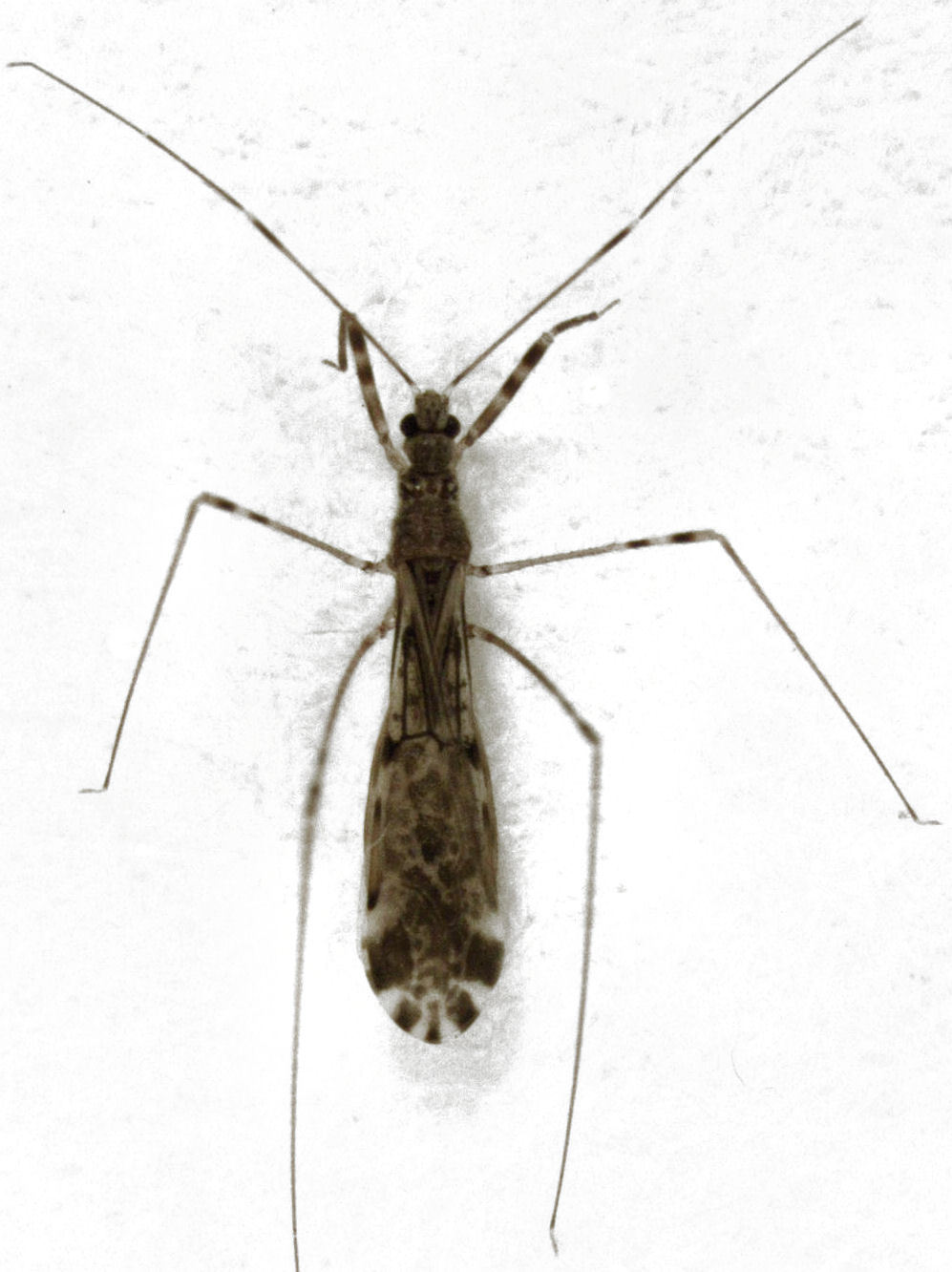
- Emesopsis infenestra

Scientific classification
- Kingdom: Animalia
- Phylum: Arthropoda
- Class: Insecta
- Order: Hemiptera
- Suborder: Heteroptera
- Family: Reduviidae
- Subfamily: Emesinae
- Tribe: Ploiariolini
- Genus: Emesopsis; Uhler, 1893

= Emesopsis =

Genus of true bugs

Emesopsis is a genus of tropical bugs (Heteroptera) from the family Reduviidae. There are at least 22 described species, of which one, E. nubila, also occurs in southern Europe.

The representatives of this genus are mostly relatively small, and measure a few millimeters to about one centimeter.

They move, as is common for the bugs of the subfamily Emesinae, with their back and middle legs. The raptorial front legs serve to capture prey. With them, the prey is captured, then bitten through with the mandibles and carried away. Then it is drained, which can sometimes take half an hour. Emesopsis prey on a variety of insect groups, ranging from beetles, bugs, flies, to springtails.

== Habitat and distribution ==
The species of the genus Emesopsis be found both in agricultural and forest ecosystems.

They occur primarily in tropical Asia (e.g. India, Thailand, Malaysia, Vietnam, Japan, New Guinea) and Australia (e.g. E. bunda in Queensland). Only E. nubila is pantropical, probably a consequence of the spread of global trade.

== partial species list ==
- Emesopsis aberrans (Distant, 1909)
- Emesopsis aemula (Horvath, 1914)
- Emesopsis albispinosa Ishikawa & Okajima, 2004
- Emesopsis amoenus Wygodzinsky & Usinger, 1960
- Emesopsis bellulus Wygodzinsky & Usinger, 1960
- Emesopsis bunda Wygodzinsky, 1956
- Emesopsis decoris Wygodzinsky & Usinger, 1960
- Emesopsis gaius McAtee & Malloch, 1926
- Emesopsis gallienus McAtee & Malloch, 1926
- Emesopsis habros Wygodzinsky & Usinger, 1960
- Emesopsis hadrian McAtee & Malloch, 1926 Hadrian
- Emesopsis imbellis (Horvath, 1914)
- Emesopsis infenestra Tatarnic, Wall & Cassis, 2011
- Emesopsis longipilosa Ishikawa & Okajima, 2004
- Emesopsis medusa (Kirkaldy, 1908)
- Emesopsis nero McAtee & Malloch, 1926
- Emesopsis nubila Uhler, 1893
- Emesopsis obsoletus McAtee & Malloch, 1926
- Emesopsis pallidicoxa (Usinger, 1946)
- Emesopsis plagiatus Miller, 1941
- Emesopsis scitulus Wygodzinsky & Usinger, 1960
- Emesopsis spicatus McAtee & Malloch, 1926
- Emesopsis streiti Kovac & Yang, 1995
