= Pseudosaica =

Scientific classification
- Kingdom: Animalia
- Phylum: Arthropoda
- Clade: Pancrustacea
- Class: Insecta
- Order: Hemiptera
- Suborder: Heteroptera
- Family: Reduviidae
- Subfamily: Saicinae
- Genus: Pseudosaica; Blinn, 1990

Genus of true bugs

Pseudosaica is a genus of assassin bugs in the family Reduviidae. There are at least two described species in Pseudosaica.

== Species ==
These two species belong to the genus Pseudosaica:

- Pseudosaica florida (Barber, 1914)
- Pseudosaica panamaensis Blinn, 1990
