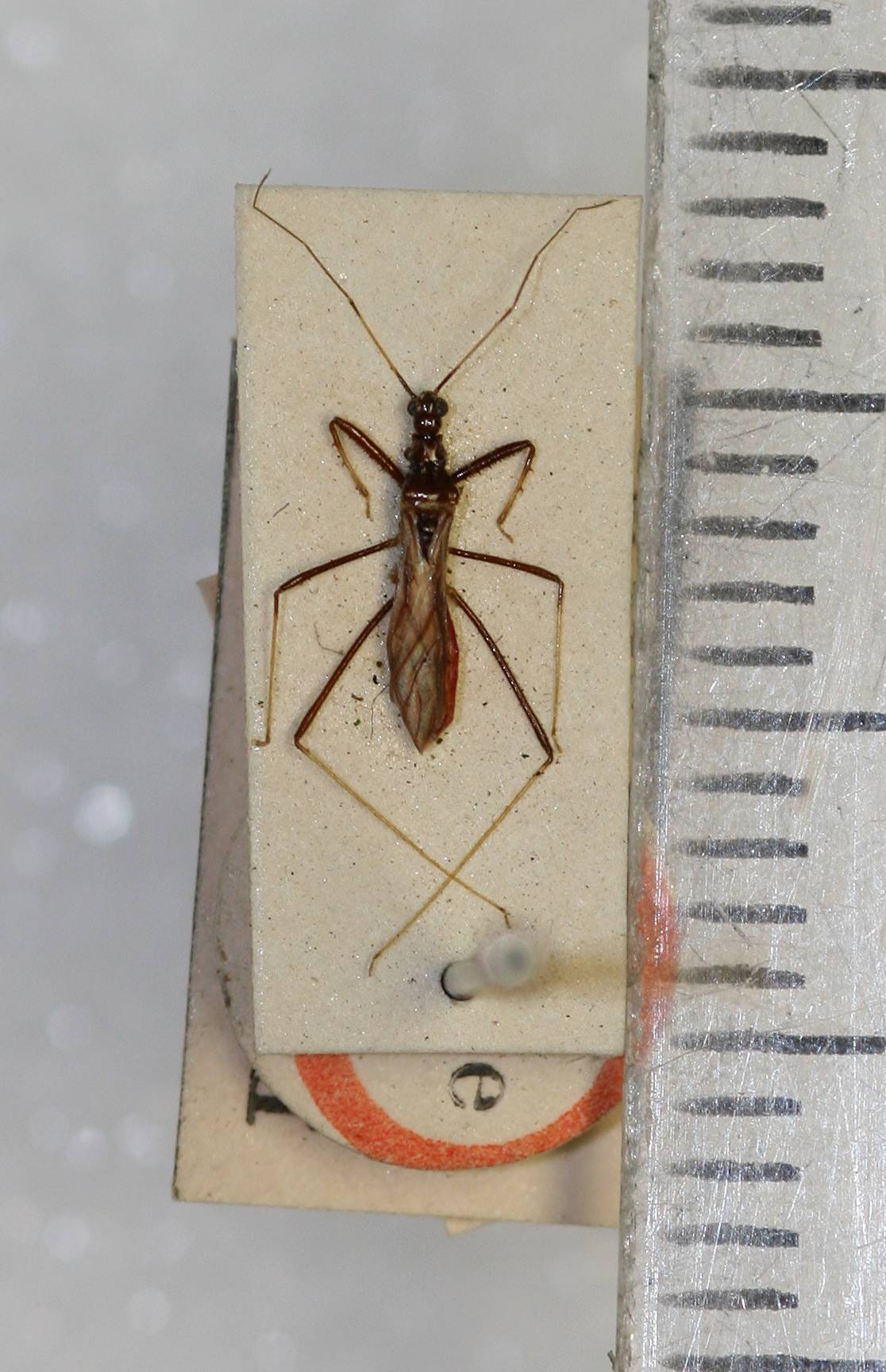
- Tagalis seminigra

Scientific classification
- Kingdom: Animalia
- Phylum: Arthropoda
- Clade: Pancrustacea
- Class: Insecta
- Order: Hemiptera
- Suborder: Heteroptera
- Family: Reduviidae
- Subfamily: Saicinae
- Genus: Tagalis; Stål, 1860

= Tagalis =

Genus of true bugs

Tagalis is a genus of assassin bugs in the family Reduviidae.

== Species ==
- Tagalis evavilmae Gil-Santana, Gouveia & Zeraik, 2010
- Tagalis seminigra Champion, 1899
