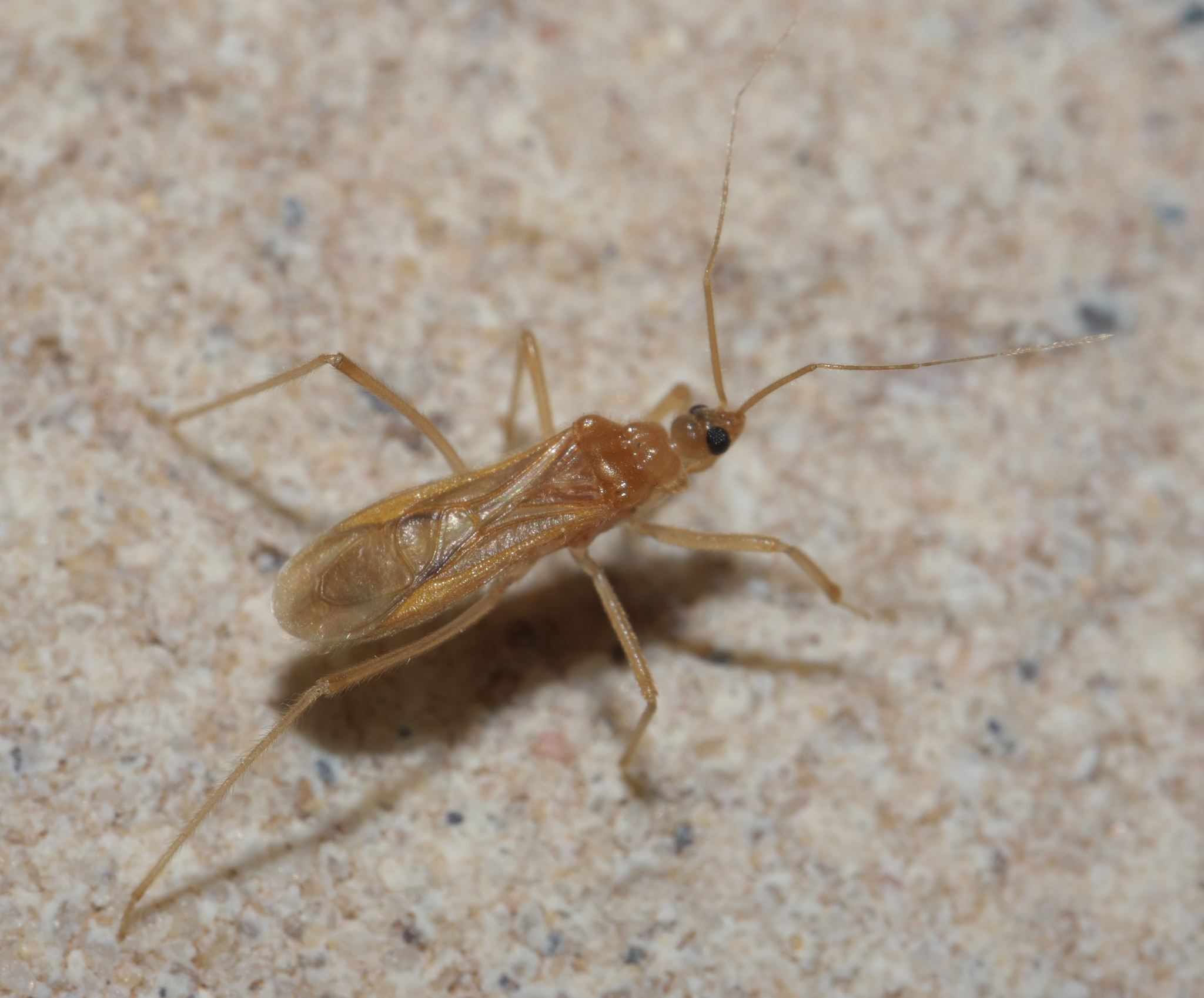
- Oncerotrachelus pallidus, Texas

Scientific classification
- Domain: Eukaryota
- Kingdom: Animalia
- Phylum: Arthropoda
- Class: Insecta
- Order: Hemiptera
- Suborder: Heteroptera
- Family: Reduviidae
- Genus: Oncerotrachelus
- Species: O. pallidus

Binomial name
- Oncerotrachelus pallidus Barber, 1922

= Oncerotrachelus pallidus =

Species of true bug

Oncerotrachelus pallidus is a species of assassin bug in the family Reduviidae. It is found in North America.
