= Bagauda (bug) =

Scientific classification
- Kingdom: Animalia
- Phylum: Arthropoda
- Class: Insecta
- Order: Hemiptera
- Suborder: Heteroptera
- Family: Reduviidae
- Tribe: Leistarchini
- Genus: Bagauda; Bergroth, 1903

Synonyms
- Pleias Kirkaldy, 1901

Genus of true bugs

Bagauda is a genus of thread-legged bug within the subfamily Emesinae, consisting of about 20 known species. Many species in this genus are associated with caves, with some being exclusively cave-dwelling. Bagauda is synonymous with the genus Pleias Kirkaldy, 1901, but Bagauda has become more commonly used. The genus is restricted to the Old World tropics.

== Species list ==
- Bagauda aelleni Villiers, 1970
- Bagauda atypicus Ghate, Boyane & Joshi, 2019
- Bagauda avidus Bergroth, 1903
- Bagauda brunneus McAtee and Malloch, 1926
- Bagauda cavernicola Paiva, 1919
- Bagauda creppei Lhoste, 1939
- Bagauda eriksoni Miller, 1954
- Bagauda ernstmayri Kulkarni and Ghate, 2016
- Bagauda furcosus Ribes, 1987
- Bagauda giganteus Lhoste, 1939
- Bagauda gilletti Miller, 1956
- Bagauda lucifugus McAtee and Malloch, 1926
- Bagauda monodi Villiers, 1972
- Bagauda ritsemae (Kirkaldy, 1901)
- Bagauda similis Wygodzinsky, 1966
- Bagauda smithersi Wygodzinsky, 1966
- Bagauda splendens Distant, 1906
- Bagauda strinattii Villiers, 1970
- Bagauda tenebricola Horváth, 1910
- Bagauda wagneri Villiers, 1949
- Bagauda zetteli Rédei, 2005
- Bagauda zigzag Rédei and Tsai, 2010
