= Ploiaria metapterina =

Scientific classification
- Domain: Eukaryota
- Kingdom: Animalia
- Phylum: Arthropoda
- Class: Insecta
- Order: Hemiptera
- Suborder: Heteroptera
- Family: Reduviidae
- Genus: Ploiaria
- Species: P. metapterina

Binomial name
- Ploiaria metapterina Redei, 2007

Species of true bug

Ploiaria metapterina is a species of true bug found in SE Australia.
