= Collartida =

Scientific classification
- Kingdom: Animalia
- Phylum: Arthropoda
- Class: Insecta
- Order: Hemiptera
- Suborder: Heteroptera
- Family: Reduviidae
- Tribe: Collartidini
- Genus: Collartida; Villiers, 1949

Genus of true bugs

Collartida is a genus of assassin bugs. The genus was thought to be restricted to Africa, Israel and the Canary Islands, but a newly discovered species was recently reported from Taiwan (in 2010). The genus currently consists of 11 species.

== List of species ==
- Collartida anophthalma Español & Ribes, 1983
- Collartida eowilsoni Davranoglou, Baňař, Malenovský & Kment, 2022
- Collartida microphthalma Villiers, 1961
- Collartida nigella Linnavuori, 1974
- Collartida oculata Villiers, 1949
- Collartida peregrina Rédei & Tsai, 2010
- Collartida pericarti Villiers, 1968
- Collartida phryne Linnavuori, 1973
- Collartida serapis Linnavuori, 1974
- Collartida tanausu Ribes, Oromi, & Ribes, 1998
- Collartida zephyrus Linnavuori, 1974
