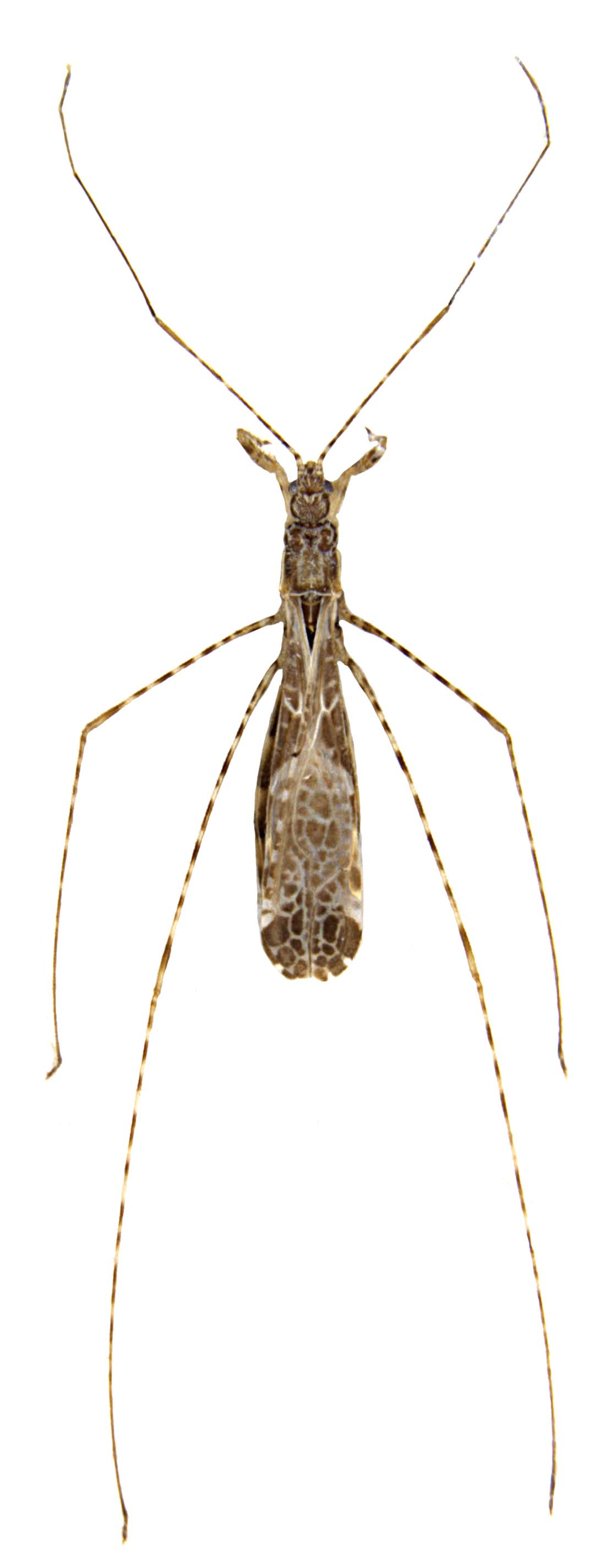

Scientific classification
- Domain: Eukaryota
- Kingdom: Animalia
- Phylum: Arthropoda
- Class: Insecta
- Order: Hemiptera
- Suborder: Heteroptera
- Family: Reduviidae
- Genus: Empicoris
- Species: E. culiciformis

Binomial name
- Empicoris culiciformis (De Geer, 1773)

= Empicoris culiciformis =

Species of true bug

Empicoris culiciformis is a species of predatory true bugs with a Holarctic distribution.

The species is found in Europe, across the Palearctic to the Russian Far East and temperate China and the range includes North Africa, and North America. Empicoris are delicate-looking insects with raptorial forelegs. They feed on barklice. Empicoris are not so often observed because of their hidden way of life. They live in hollow and mouldering trees, barns, chicken coops and cracks in old walls.
