= Saicella =

Scientific classification
- Domain: Eukaryota
- Kingdom: Animalia
- Phylum: Arthropoda
- Class: Insecta
- Order: Hemiptera
- Suborder: Heteroptera
- Family: Reduviidae
- Genus: Saicella; Usinger, 1958

Genus of true bugs

Saicella is a genus of assassin bugs endemic to Hawaii. There are currently six species in the genus. Saicella's taxonomic position is uncertain, with characters similar to both the Saicinae and Emesinae subfamilies.

== List of species ==
- Saicella kipahulu Polhemus, 2000
- Saicella lilinoe Polhemus, 2000
- Saicella mulli Polhemus, 2000
- Saicella perkinsi Polhemus, 2000
- Saicella smithi Usinger, 1958
- Saicella usingeri Wygodzinsky, 1966
