= Proguithera inexpectata =

Scientific classification
- Domain: Eukaryota
- Kingdom: Animalia
- Phylum: Arthropoda
- Class: Insecta
- Order: Hemiptera
- Suborder: Heteroptera
- Family: Reduviidae
- Genus: Proguithera
- Species: P. inexpectata

Binomial name
- Proguithera inexpectata Redei, 2004

Species of true bug

Proguithera inexpectata is thread-legged bug known from Afghanistan. The holotype was collected in Nuristan in 1963. It is the only known species of the Guithera–Lutevula group in the Palaearctic Region.
