= Pseudosaica florida =

Scientific classification
- Domain: Eukaryota
- Kingdom: Animalia
- Phylum: Arthropoda
- Class: Insecta
- Order: Hemiptera
- Suborder: Heteroptera
- Family: Reduviidae
- Genus: Pseudosaica
- Species: P. florida

Binomial name
- Pseudosaica florida (Barber, 1914)

Synonyms
- Saica florida Barber, 1914

Species of true bug

Pseudosaica florida is a species of assassin bug in the family Reduviidae. It is found in North America.
