= Saica elkinsi =

Scientific classification
- Domain: Eukaryota
- Kingdom: Animalia
- Phylum: Arthropoda
- Class: Insecta
- Order: Hemiptera
- Suborder: Heteroptera
- Family: Reduviidae
- Genus: Saica
- Species: S. elkinsi

Binomial name
- Saica elkinsi Blinn, 1994

Species of true bug

Saica elkinsi is a species of assassin bug in the family Reduviidae. It is found in North America.
