= Collartidini =

Scientific classification
- Domain: Eukaryota
- Kingdom: Animalia
- Phylum: Arthropoda
- Class: Insecta
- Order: Hemiptera
- Suborder: Heteroptera
- Family: Reduviidae
- Subfamily: Emesinae
- Tribe: Collartidini; Wygodzinski, 1966

Tribe of true bugs

The Collartidini is a tribe of thread-legged bugs restricted to Africa, Sri Lanka and Taiwan. Wygodzinsky (1966) proposed that this group is the sister group of the remaining Emesinae.

== List of genera ==
- Collartida Villiers, 1949
- Mangabea Villiers, 1970
- Stenorhamphus Elkins, 1962
