= Empicoris seorsus =

Conservation status
- Data Deficit (NZ TCS)

Scientific classification
- Kingdom: Animalia
- Phylum: Arthropoda
- Class: Insecta
- Order: Hemiptera
- Suborder: Heteroptera
- Family: Reduviidae
- Genus: Empicoris
- Species: E. seorsus

Binomial name
- Empicoris seorsus Bergroth, 1926

Species of true bug

Empicoris seorsus is a species of thread-legged bug endemic to New Zealand. It is one of four species of Empicoris present in New Zealand. Under the New Zealand Threat Classification System, it is listed as "Data Deficient" as of 2012.
