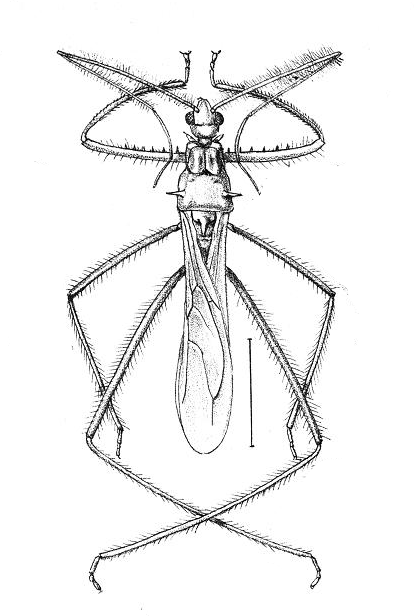
- Saica rubripes Champion, 1899

Scientific classification
- Kingdom: Animalia
- Phylum: Arthropoda
- Clade: Pancrustacea
- Class: Insecta
- Order: Hemiptera
- Suborder: Heteroptera
- Family: Reduviidae
- Subfamily: Saicinae; Stål, 1859

Genera
- See text

= Saicinae =

Subfamily of true bugs

Saicinae is a subfamily of the family Reduviidae, or the assassin bugs.

== Genera ==
- Bagriella McAtee & Malloch, 1923
- Buninotus Maldonado & Capriles, 1981
- Caprilesia Gil-Santana, Marques & Costa, 2006
- Gallobelgicus Distant, 1906
- Kiskeyana Weiruach & Forero, 2007
- Oncerotrachelus Stål, 1860
- Paratagalis Monte, 1943
- Polytoxus Spinola, 1840
- Pseudosaica Blinn, 1990
- Saica Amyot and Serville, 1843
- Saicireta Melo & Coscarón, 2005
- Tagalis Stål, 1860

The taxonomic position of the genus Saicella Usinger, 1958 is uncertain, with characters similar to both the subfamilies Saicinae and Emesinae.
