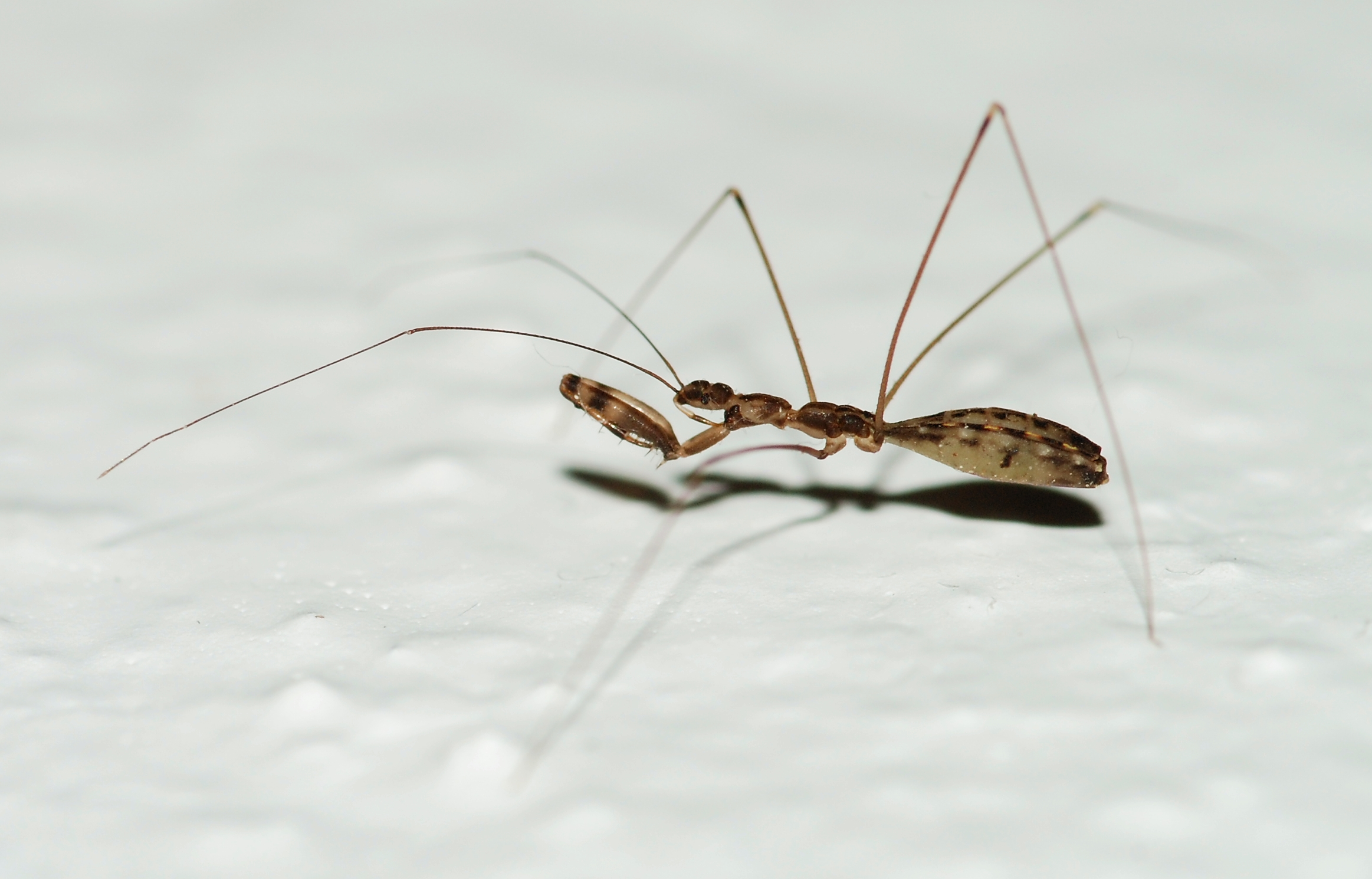
- Adult Ploiaria domestica

Scientific classification
- Domain: Eukaryota
- Kingdom: Animalia
- Phylum: Arthropoda
- Class: Insecta
- Order: Hemiptera
- Suborder: Heteroptera
- Family: Reduviidae
- Tribe: Leistarchini
- Genus: Ploiaria; Scopoli, 1786

Diversity
- About 130 species

= Ploiaria =

Genus of true bugs

Ploiaria is a cosmopolitan genus of thread-legged bugs (Emesinae). There are presently about 130 described species.

== Description ==
Ploiaria can be recognised by the head without ventral spine-like setae, the medially emarginated posterior margin of the prosternum, the posterior pronotal lobe covering only the extreme base of the mesonotum, the scutellum and metanotum lacking spines, the profemora lacking a process with several spine-like setae, and three-segmented protarsi. There is great variation in wing development between different species and within species, with macroptery (developed wings), brachyptery (reduced wings) and aptery (winglessness) all occurring in the genus.

== Habitat ==
These bugs live in various habitats ranging from tropical forests to deserts and even oceanic islands (presumably reached by rafting on tree trunks). Their microhabitat range includes trees, epiphytes, leaf litter, under bark and under stones. The species P. chilensis and P. domestica are synanthropes, meaning they are associated with human habitats.

== Diet ==
Ploiaria, like other emesines, are predators. They have been recorded feeding on prey such as Phlebotomus flies, mosquitoes and planthoppers.

== Selected species ==
This list contains all species of Ploiaria currently considered valid, except for a few that have been described very recently:

- Ploiaria abrupta Noualhier, 1895
- Ploiaria albipennis McAtee & Malloch, 1925
- Ploiaria alexanderi Wygodzinsky, 1954
- Ploiaria anak Distant, 1909
- Ploiaria antipoda Bergroth, 1927
- Ploiaria apicata McAtee & Malloch, 1926
- Ploiaria aptera McAtee & Malloch, 1925
- Ploiaria armstrongi Wygodzinsky, 1956
- Ploiaria assimilata Van Duzee, 1935
- Ploiaria bakeri McAtee & Malloch, 1926
- Ploiaria basilewskyi Villiers, 1961
- Ploiaria bequaerti Wygodzinsky, 1953
- Ploiaria berlandi Villiers, 1943
- Ploiaria biroi Wygodzinsky, 1966
- Ploiaria borbonica Villiers, 1971
- Ploiaria brincki Wygodzinsky, 1958
- Ploiaria brunnea McAtee & Malloch, 1925
- Ploiaria buscki Wygodzinsky, 1925
- Ploiaria californiensis Baker, 1910
- Ploiaria capeneri Wygodzinsky, 1952
- Ploiaria capensis Villiers, 1949
- Ploiaria carolina (Herrich-Schaeffer, 1850)
- Ploiaria carvalhoi Wygodzinsky, 1966
- Ploiaria chilensis (Philippi, 1862)
- Ploiaria circe (Kirkaldy, 1908)
- Ploiaria concolor (Dohrn, 1860)
- Ploiaria congoana (Villiers, 1949)
- Ploiaria cunnamulla Wygodzinsky, 1956
- Ploiaria darlingtoni Wygodzinsky, 1954
- Ploiaria decorata Villiers, 1950
- Ploiaria denieri Wygodzinsky, 1954
- Ploiaria denticauda McAtee & Malloch, 1925
- Ploiaria disponsi Linnavuori, 1965
- Ploiaria djurdjurana Dispons, 1951
- Ploiaria domestica Scopoli, 1786
- Ploiaria elegantula Villiers, 1952
- Ploiaria ellenbergeri Villiers, 1948
- Ploiaria fairmairei (Dohrn, 1860)
- Ploiaria floridana (Bergroth, 1922)
- Ploiaria funebris (Bergroth, 1906)
- Ploiaria gabonensis (Villiers, 1948)
- Ploiaria geijskesi Wygodzinsky, 1945
- Ploiaria geniculata (Stål, 1874)
- Ploiaria glabella Wygodzinsky, 1966
- Ploiaria gracilipes Villiers, 1973
- Ploiaria granulata McAtee & Malloch, 1925
- Ploiaria greeni Distant, 1903
- Ploiaria guadeloupensis Villiers, 1978
- Ploiaria gundlachi (Dohrn, 1860)
- Ploiaria guttata Wygodzinsky, 1956
- Ploiaria gutturalis Noualhier, 1895
- Ploiaria hainana Hsiao, 1965
- Ploiaria halosydne Wygodzinsky & Usinger, 1960
- Ploiaria hewitti China, 1925
- Ploiaria hirticornis (N.Banks, 1909)
- Ploiaria icela Wygodzinsky, 1958
- Ploiaria insolida White, 1877
- Ploiaria isadas (Kirkaldy, 1901)
- Ploiaria jimmiwum Wygodzinsky, 1966
- Ploiaria katznelsoni (Dispons, 1964)
- Ploiaria kocheri Dispons, 1963
- Ploiaria lestoni (Villiers, 1967)
- Ploiaria longa Maldonado, 1972
- Ploiaria longiventris (Dohrn, 1863)
- Ploiaria maai Wygodzinsky, 1966
- Ploiaria macrophthalma (Dohrn, 1860)
- Ploiaria maria Maldonado, 1948
- Ploiaria matilei Dispons & Villiers, 1967
- Ploiaria maya Wygodzinsky, 1966
- Ploiaria media McAtee & Malloch, 1926
- Ploiaria megalops (Champion, 1898)
- Ploiaria mellea McAtee & Malloch, 1926
- Ploiaria metapterina
- Ploiaria mimeuri Villiers, 1943
- Ploiaria modesta Montrouzier, 1865
- Ploiaria montivaga Dispons, 1963
- Ploiaria mosconai Wygodzinsky, 1952
- Ploiaria moshesh Wygodzinsky, 1958
- Ploiaria musgravei Wygodzinsky, 1956
- Ploiaria nilotica Villiers, 1973
- Ploiaria nitida McAtee & Malloch, 1925
- Ploiaria noualhieri Villiers, 1943
- Ploiaria obscura Wygodzinsky, 1956
- Ploiaria oculata (Villiers, 1949)
- Ploiaria pallida Montrouzier, 1855
- Ploiaria palmarum Maldonado, 1974
- Ploiaria paveli
- Ploiaria penai Wygodzinsky, 1954
- Ploiaria phyllodoce Wygodzinsky & Usinger, 1960
- Ploiaria pilicornis McAtee & Malloch, 1925
- Ploiaria plaumanni Wygodzinsky, 1966
- Ploiaria poncei Maldonado, 1948
- Ploiaria praedator (Champion, 1898)
- Ploiaria praesentans (Distant, 1909)
- Ploiaria punctipes McAtee & Malloch, 1925
- Ploiaria putoni Noualhier, 1895
- Ploiaria recta McAtee & Malloch, 1926
- Ploiaria regina Wygodzinsky, 1956
- Ploiaria reticulata (Baker, 1910)
- Ploiaria rufoannulata (Bergroth, 1911)
- Ploiaria sachtlebeni Villiers, 1948
- Ploiaria sefrana Dispons, 1960
- Ploiaria setulifera McAtee & Malloch, 1925
- Ploiaria sexdentata Lindberg, 1932
- Ploiaria sicaria McAtee & Malloch, 1925
- Ploiaria similis McAtee & Malloch, 1925
- Ploiaria sonoraensis (Van Duzee, 1923)
- Ploiaria soudanica Dispons, 1960
- Ploiaria speluncaria Villiers, 1979
- Ploiaria stysi
- Ploiaria texana N.Banks, 1909
- Ploiaria thetis Wygodzinsky & Usinger, 1960
- Ploiaria tibestina Villiers, 1982
- Ploiaria tillandsiacola Maldonado & Brailovsky, 1983
- Ploiaria tuberculata Villiers, 1949
- Ploiaria turkestanica Putshkov, 1984
- Ploiaria ultima McAtee & Malloch, 1966
- Ploiaria umbrarum McAtee & Malloch, 1925
- Ploiaria uniseriata McAtee & Malloch, 1925
- Ploiaria vandoesburgi Redei, 2008
- Ploiaria varipennis McAtee & Malloch, 1925
- Ploiaria villiersi Maldonado, 1978
- Ploiaria vincenti (Villiers, 1966)
- Ploiaria wahrmani Wygodzinsky, 1952
- Ploiaria woodwardi Wygodzinsky, 1956
- Ploiaria yunquensis Maldonado, 1948
