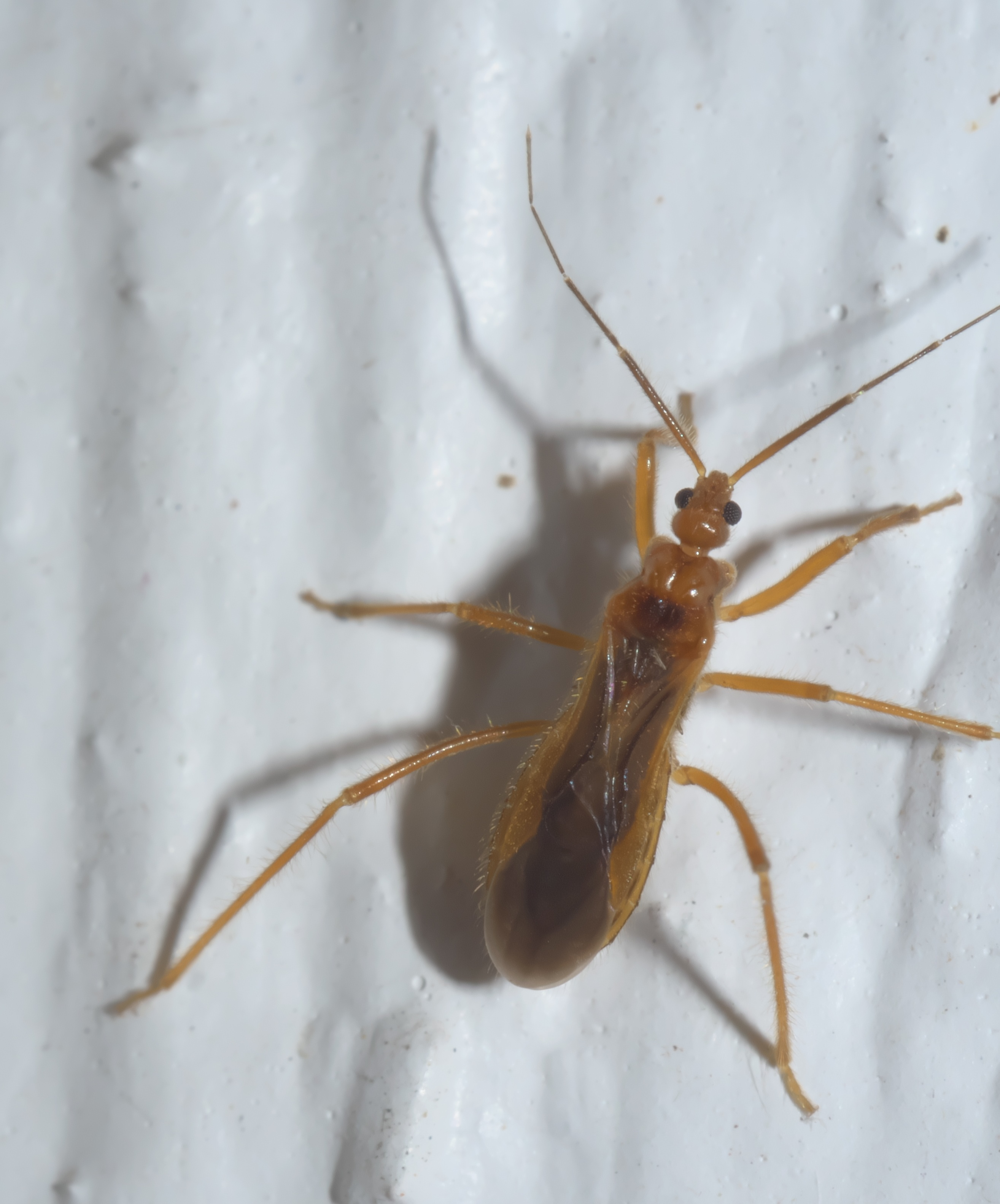

Scientific classification
- Domain: Eukaryota
- Kingdom: Animalia
- Phylum: Arthropoda
- Class: Insecta
- Order: Hemiptera
- Suborder: Heteroptera
- Family: Reduviidae
- Genus: Oncerotrachelus
- Species: O. acuminatus

Binomial name
- Oncerotrachelus acuminatus (Say, 1832)

Synonyms
- Reduvius acuminatus Say, 1832

= Oncerotrachelus acuminatus =

Species of true bug

Oncerotrachelus acuminatus is a species of assassin bug in the family Reduviidae. It is found in the Caribbean Sea, Central America, and North America.

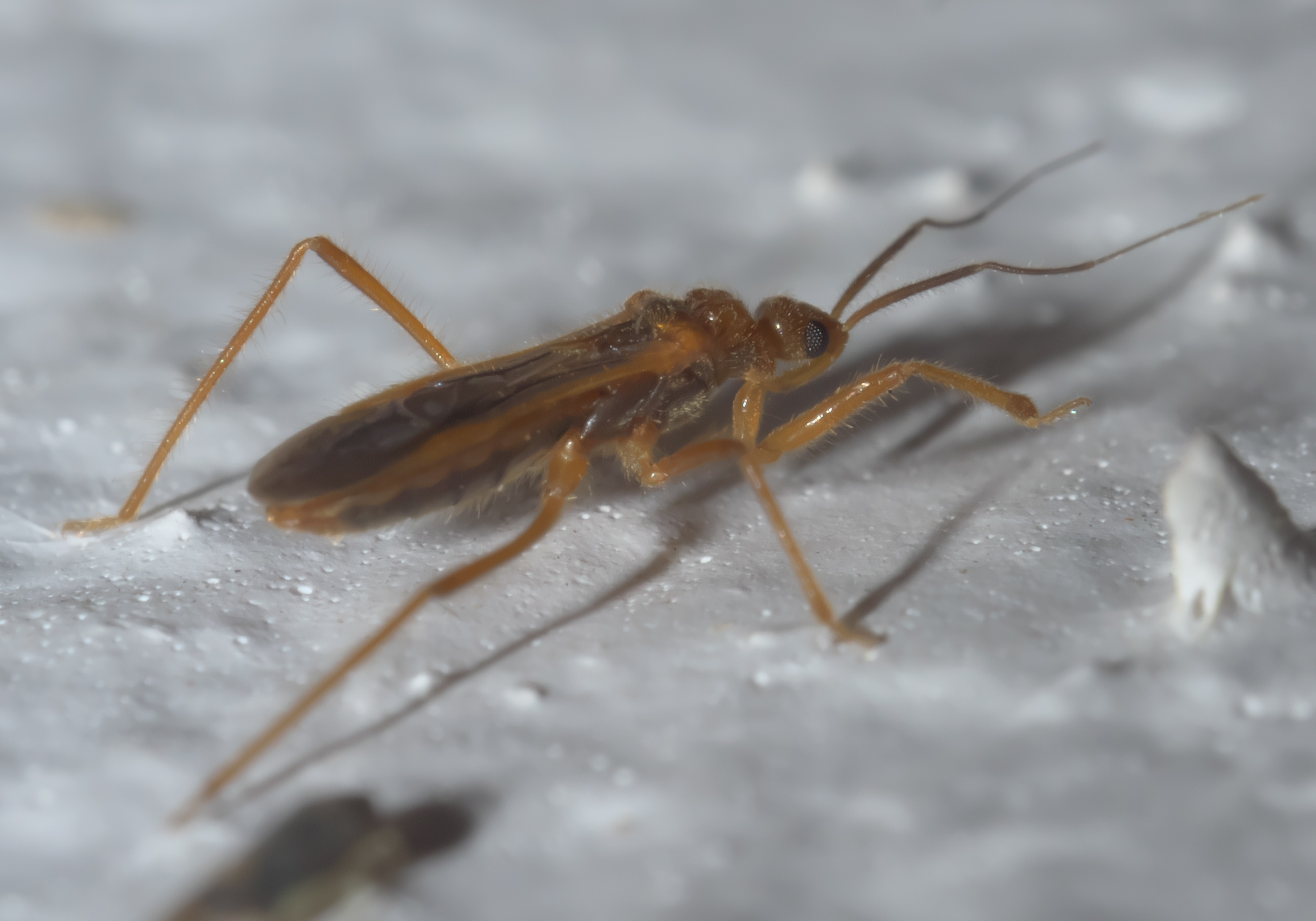
