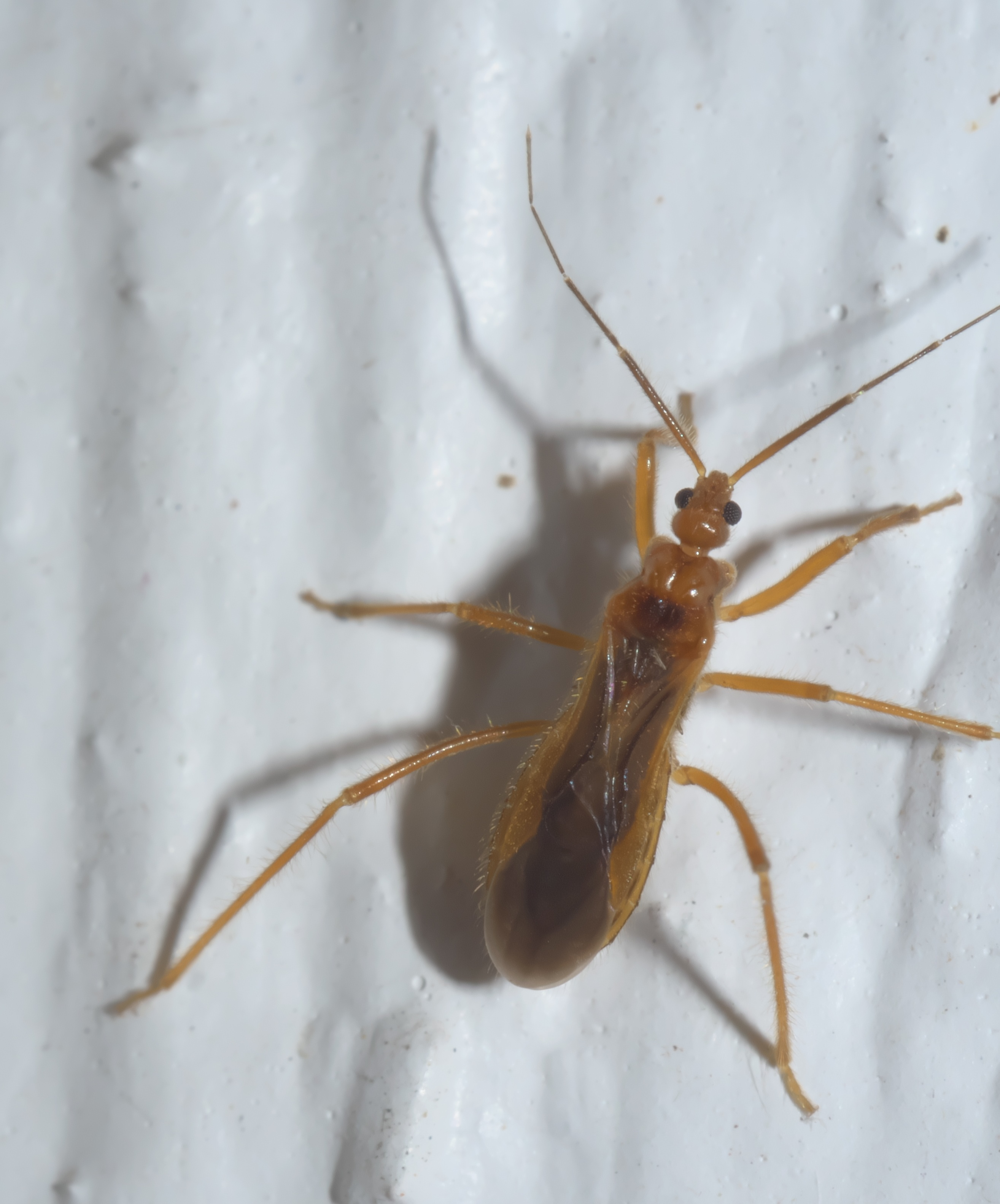
- Oncerotrachelus acuminatus

Scientific classification
- Kingdom: Animalia
- Phylum: Arthropoda
- Clade: Pancrustacea
- Class: Insecta
- Order: Hemiptera
- Suborder: Heteroptera
- Family: Reduviidae
- Subfamily: Saicinae
- Genus: Oncerotrachelus; Stål, 1868

= Oncerotrachelus =

Genus of true bugs

Oncerotrachelus is a genus of assassin bugs in the family Reduviidae. There are about 14 described species in Oncerotrachelus.

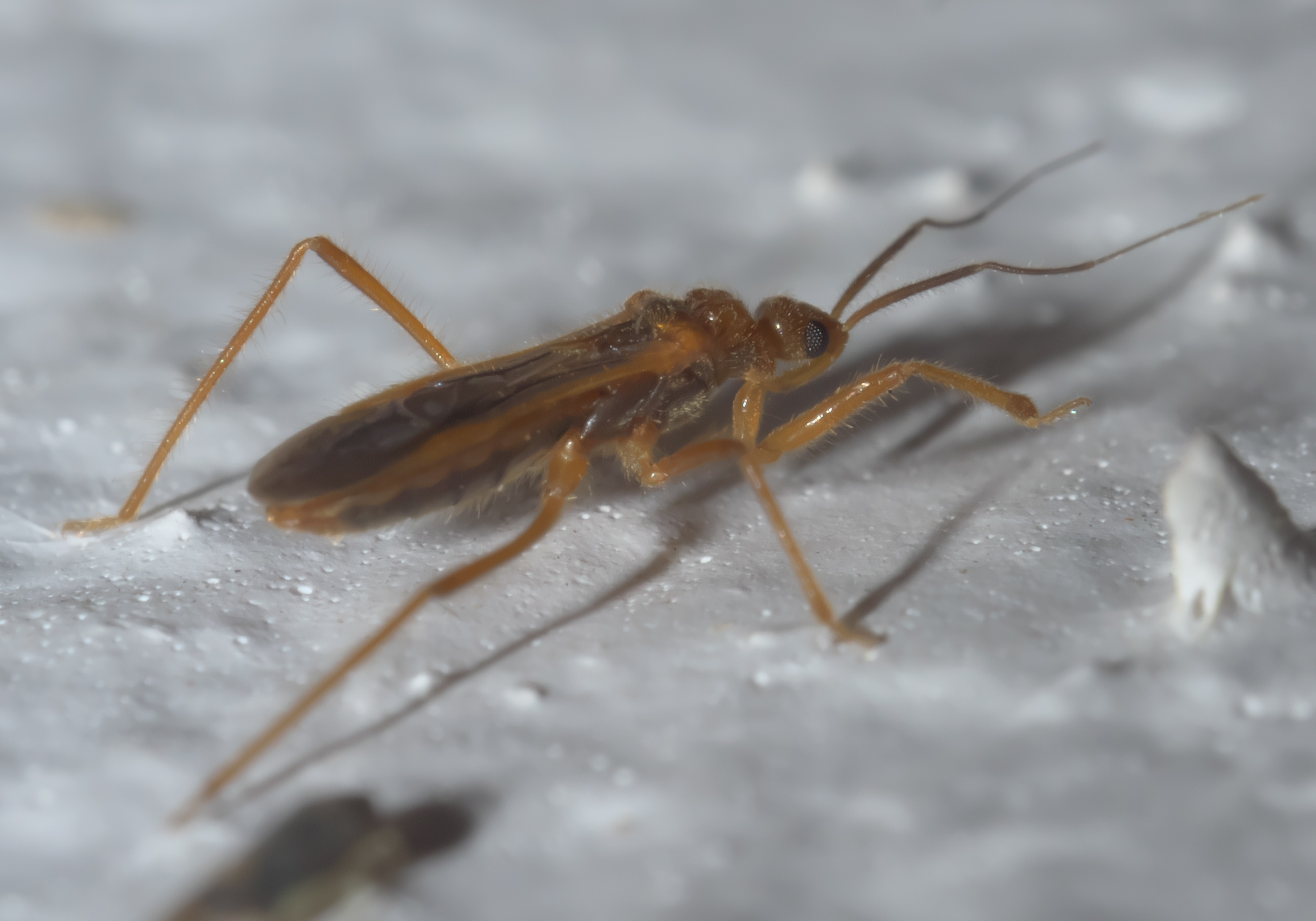
Oncerotrachelus acuminatus

== Species ==
These 14 species belong to the genus Oncerotrachelus:

- Oncerotrachelus acuminatus (Say, 1832)
- Oncerotrachelus amazonensis Gil-Santana, 2013-13
- Oncerotrachelus conformis Uhler, 1894
- Oncerotrachelus coxatus McAtee & Malloch, 1923
- Oncerotrachelus cubanus Bruner & Barber, 1937
- Oncerotrachelus fuscus Monte, 1943
- Oncerotrachelus geayi Villiers, 1943
- Oncerotrachelus lynchii (Berg, 1879)
- Oncerotrachelus magnitylus Barber, 1931
- Oncerotrachelus nasutus (Bergroth, 1913)
- Oncerotrachelus pallidus Barber, 1922
- Oncerotrachelus paraconformis Gil-Santana, 2013-13
- Oncerotrachelus sabensis Cobben & Wygodzinsky, 1975
- Oncerotrachelus spiniventris Hussey, 1953
