= Bagauda, Nepal =

Bagauda बगौडा
- Village development committee
- Location in Nepal
- Coordinates: 27.44°N 84.31°E
- Country: Nepal
- Province: Bagmati Province
- District: Chitwan District

Population (2011)
  - Total: 10,913
- Time zone: UTC+5:45 (Nepal Time)

Bagauda is a former village development committee and now a part of nMadi Municipality in Chitwan District in Bagmati Province of southern Nepal. At the time of the 2011 Nepal census it had a population of 10,913 people (4,856 male; 6,057 female) living in 2,532 individual households.
