= Saica (bug) =

Scientific classification
- Kingdom: Animalia
- Phylum: Arthropoda
- Clade: Pancrustacea
- Class: Insecta
- Order: Hemiptera
- Suborder: Heteroptera
- Family: Reduviidae
- Subfamily: Saicinae
- Genus: Saica; Amyot & Serville, 1843

Genus of true bugs

Saica is a genus of assassin bugs in the family Reduviidae. There are at least three described species in Saica.

== Species ==
These three species belong to the genus Saica:

- Saica apicalis Osborn and Drake, 1915^{i c g}
- Saica elkinsi Blinn, 1994^{i c g b}
- Saica recurvata (Fabricius, 1803)^{i c g}

Data sources: i = ITIS, c = Catalogue of Life, g = GBIF, b = Bugguide.net
