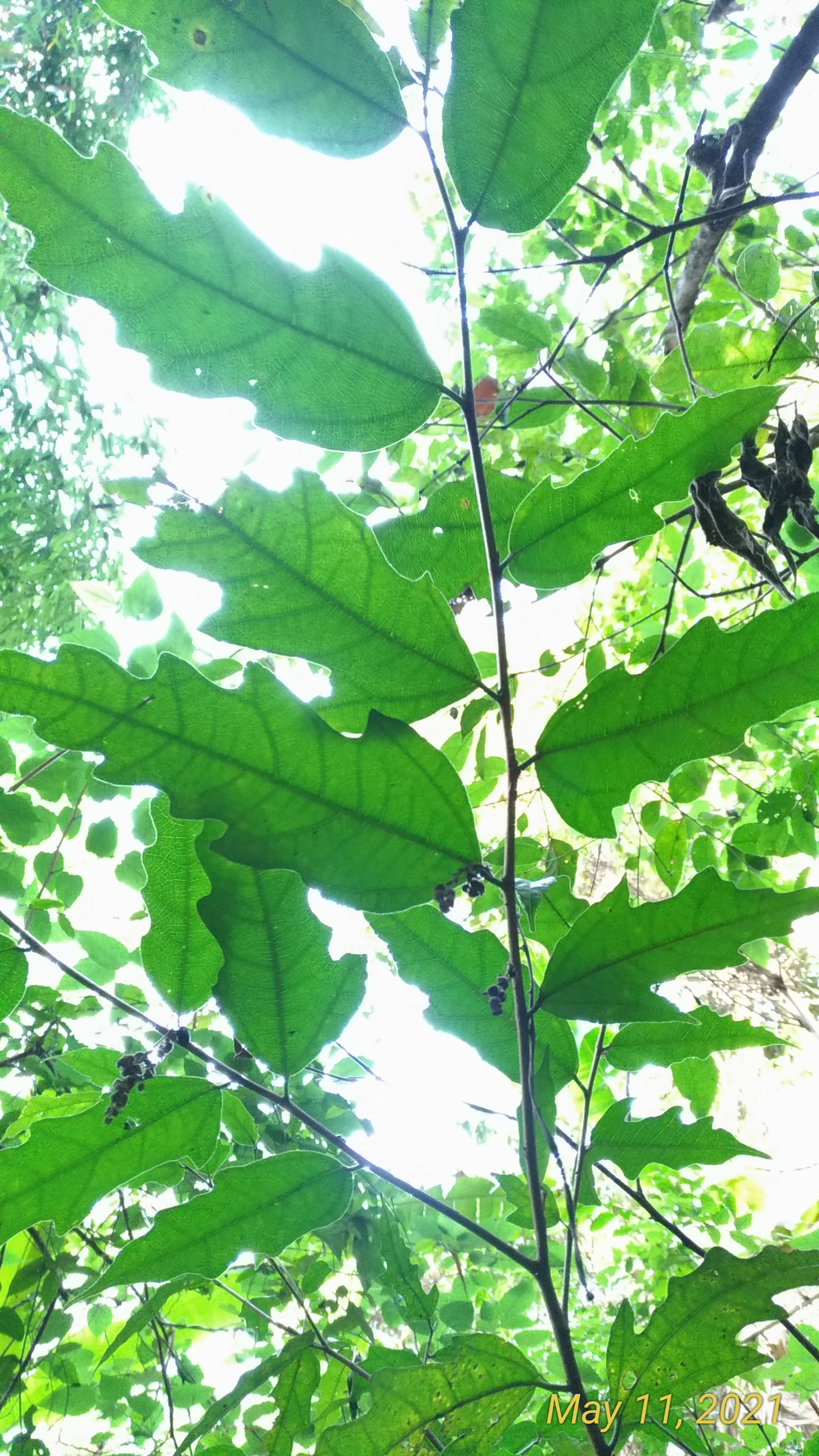
- Some individuals have scalloped or notched leaves

Conservation status
- Least Concern (IUCN 3.1)

Scientific classification
- Kingdom: Plantae
- Clade: Tracheophytes
- Clade: Angiosperms
- Clade: Eudicots
- Clade: Rosids
- Order: Rosales
- Family: Moraceae
- Genus: Ficus
- Species: F. ampelos

Binomial name
- Ficus ampelos Burm.f.

Synonyms
- List: Ficus ampelos var. bandana (Miq.) Miq.; Ficus ampelos var. bogoriensis (Koord. & Valeton) Hochr.; Ficus ampelos f. bogoriensis Koord. & Valeton; Ficus ampelos f. incrassata Hochr.; Ficus ampelos var. laevior Miq.; Ficus ampelos var. rugosa Miq.; Ficus ampelos var. soronensis (King) Corner; Ficus ampelos var. sublanceolata Miq.; Ficus asperior Miq.; Ficus bandana Miq.; Ficus biglandulosa Wall. ex Miq.; Ficus blepharosepala Warb.; Ficus blumei Wall. ex Voigt; Ficus exasperata Roxb.; Ficus fachikoogi Koidz.; Ficus fastigiata Elmer; Ficus guyeri Elmer; Ficus guyeri var. minimifolia Sata; Ficus guyeri var. sibuyanensis (Elmer) Corner; Ficus guyeri var. validicaudata (Merr.) Sata; Ficus hayatae Sata; Ficus irisana Elmer; Ficus irisana var. validicaudata (Merr.) Corner; Ficus javensis Miq.; Ficus javensis var. subcrenata Miq.; Ficus kingiana Hemsl.; Ficus rubricaulis Decne.; Ficus rudis Pers.; Ficus sibuyanensis Elmer; Ficus soronensis King; Ficus tashiroi Maxim.; Ficus tenuicuspidata var. major Corner; Ficus todayensis Elmer; Ficus validicaudata Merr.

= Ficus ampelos =

Species of plant

Ficus ampelos is a species of fig in the family Moraceae, native to Bangladesh, the Nicobar Islands, Malesia, Papuasia, Taiwan, and the Ryukyu Islands. A small evergreen tree, it is usually found in broad-leafed evergreen forests at around 600 m (2,000 ft) in elevation.
