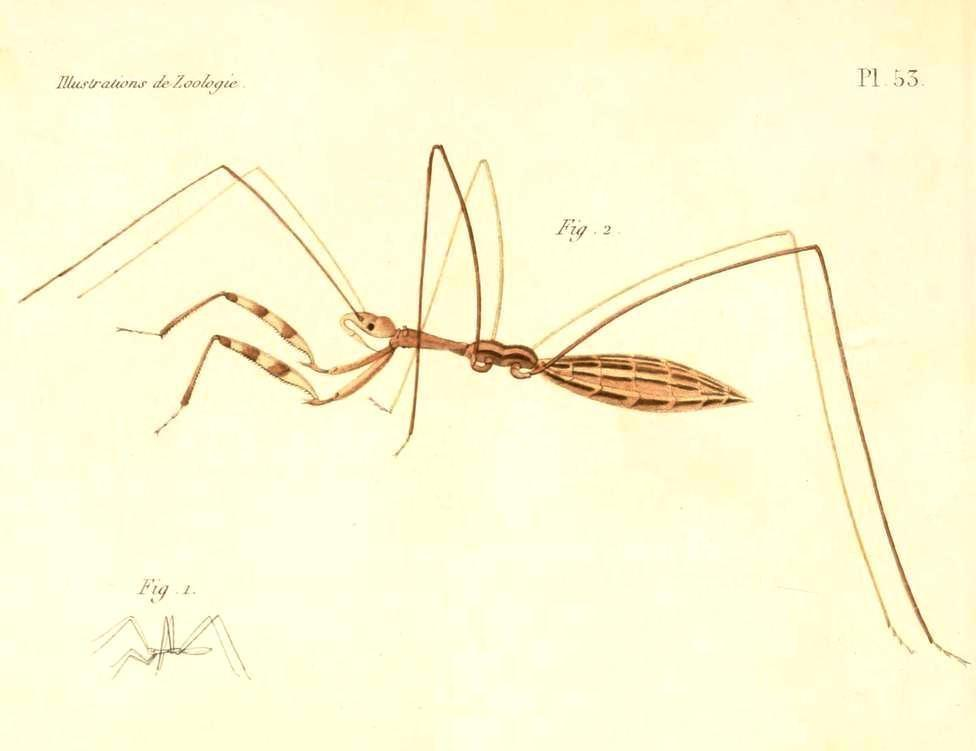
- Empicoris vagabundus

Scientific classification
- Domain: Eukaryota
- Kingdom: Animalia
- Phylum: Arthropoda
- Class: Insecta
- Order: Hemiptera
- Suborder: Heteroptera
- Family: Reduviidae
- Subfamily: Emesinae
- Tribe: Ploiariolini; Van Duzee, 1916

= Ploiariolini =

Tribe of true bugs

Ploiariolini is a tribe of thread-legged bugs, comprising 16 genera and 142 described species. Ploiariolini has a worldwide distribution.

== Partial list of genera ==
- Ademula McAtee & Malloch, 1926
- Bironiola Horváth, 1914
- Calphurniella Wygodzinsky, 1966
- Calphurnioides Distant, 1913
- Ctydinna Wygodzinsky, 1966
- Diabolicoris Wall & Cassis, 2003
- Emesopsis Uhler, 1983
- Empicoris Wolff, 1811
- Hybomatocoris Wygodzinsky, 1966
- Malacopus Stål, 1858
- Mesosepis Wygodzinsky, 1966
- Nesidiolestes Kirkaldy, 1902
- Panamia Kirkaldy, 1907
- Saicella Usinger, 1958
- Sepimesos Wygodzinsky, 1966
- Tridemula Horváth, 1914
