= Leistarchini =

Scientific classification
- Kingdom: Animalia
- Phylum: Arthropoda
- Clade: Pancrustacea
- Class: Insecta
- Order: Hemiptera
- Suborder: Heteroptera
- Family: Reduviidae
- Subfamily: Emesinae
- Tribe: Leistarchini; Van Duzee, 1916

Tribe of true bugs

The Leistarchini is a tribe of thread-legged bugs.

== Genera ==
The following are included in BioLib.cz:

1. Ambilobea Villiers, 1971
2. Ambrinemesa Villiers, 1971
3. Armstrongula Wygodzinsky, 1950
4. Atisne Wygodzinsky, 1966
5. Bagauda Bergroth, 1903
6. Bagaudella Miller, 1952
7. Bagaudina Wygodzinsky, 1966
8. Bettyella Wygodzinsky, 1966
9. Gnomocoris McAtee & Malloch, 1926
10. Gomesius Distant, 1903
11. Guithera Distant, 1906
12. Laurenticoris Villiers, 1975
13. Leistarches Dohrn, 1860
14. Lethierrya Puton, 1876
15. Lhostella Villiers, 1948
16. Lutevula Breddin, 1909
17. Mafulemesa Wygodzinsky, 1966
18. Millotina Villiers, 1953
19. Monicacoris Putshkov, 1985
20. Nesita Bergroth, 1906
21. Orianocoris Villiers, 1964
22. Orthunga Dohrn, 1859
23. Paraluteva Villiers, 1961
24. Paranesita Wygodzinsky, 1966
25. Phryxobotrys McAtee & Malloch, 1926
26. Ploiaria Scopoli, 1786
27. Proguithera Wygodzinsky, 1966
28. Pseudobagauda Wygodzinsky, 1966
29. Pseudoghiliana Maldonado, 1992
30. Tinna Dohrn, 1859
31. Tinnatunga Wygodzinsky, 1966
32. Tinnunga Wygodzinsky, 1966
33. Voloina Villiers, 1971
