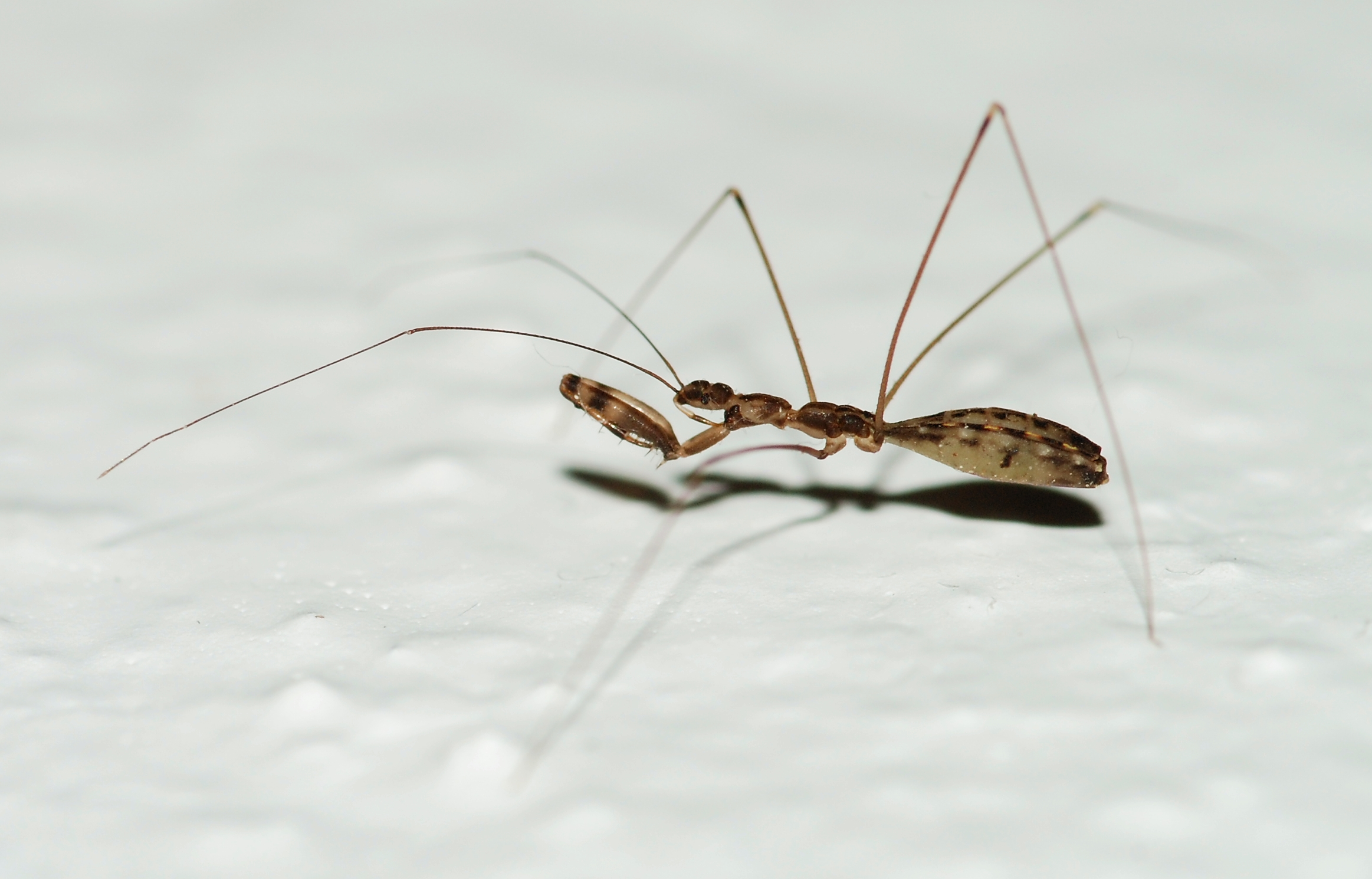
- Ploiaria domestica

Scientific classification
- Domain: Eukaryota
- Kingdom: Animalia
- Phylum: Arthropoda
- Class: Insecta
- Order: Hemiptera
- Suborder: Heteroptera
- Family: Reduviidae
- Subfamily: Emesinae; Amyot and Serville, 1843

Tribes
- Collartidini; Leistarchini; Emesini; Ploiariolini; Deliastini; Metapterini

= Emesinae =

Thread-legged bugs

Subfamily of true bugs

The Emesinae, or thread-legged bugs, are a subfamily of the Reduviidae (i.e., assassin bugs). They are conspicuously different from the other reduviids by their very slender body form. They are stalking, predatory insects that can be collected on palm fronds, cliffs, spider webbing, or near lights at night (many can be collected by blacklight). They walk on their mid and hind legs; the front pair is raptorial. Some groups specialize on spiders. Very little is known about emesines except that many species are found in the tropics. Pedro Wygodzinsky wrote the most recent revision of this group.

== Biogeography ==
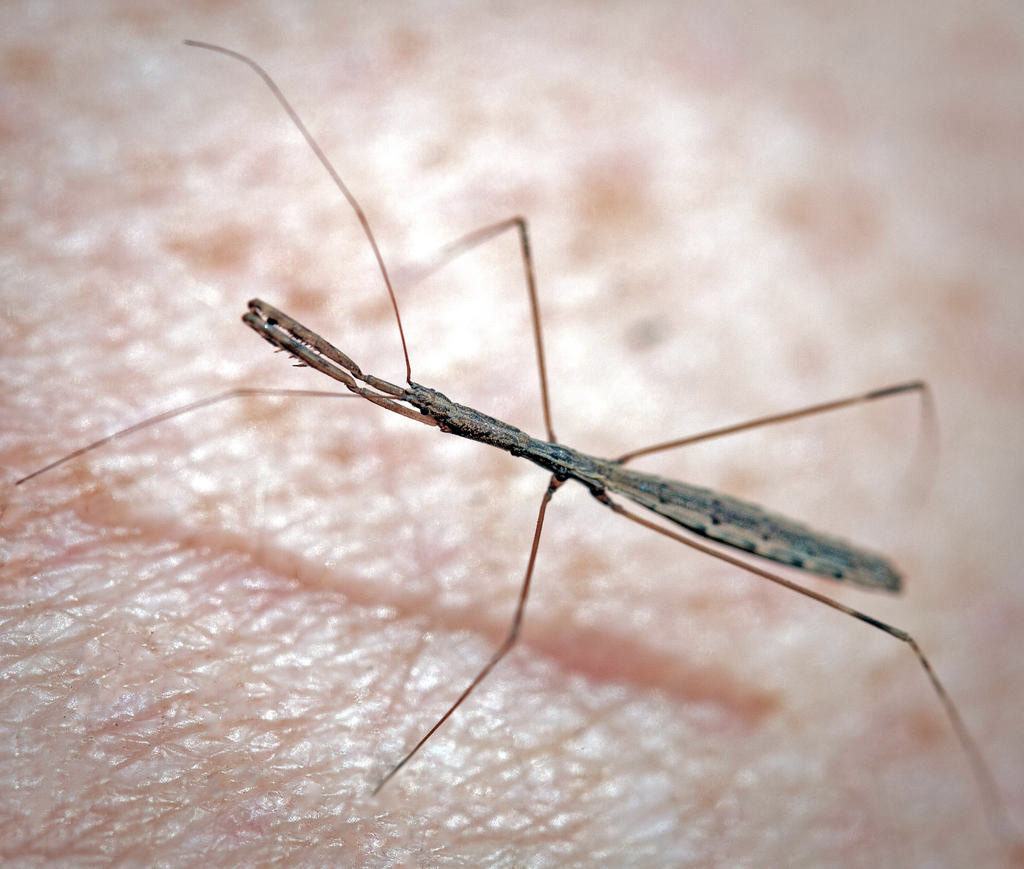
Thread Legged bug in Pennsylvania

The Emesinae are cosmopolitan in distribution; however, they are most abundant in the tropics. For example, the tribe Metapterini, while having a worldwide distribution, has the majority of its diversity confined to tropical islands. The center of emesine diversity is apparently Africa. This continent contains the only species of the most plesiomorphic tribe, the Collartidini, while a more derived tribe, the Deliastini, is restricted to South America. About 90 genera and 900 species have been described in the Emesinae.

== Systematics ==
The first cladistic analysis of the Reduviidae (assassin bugs) based on molecular data (mitochondrial and nuclear ribosomal DNA) was published in 2009. This analysis suggested that the Emesinae are not monophyletic. The analysis sampled only seven specimens of Emesinae, though five of the six currently recognized tribes were included. The analysis suggested that the Emesinae are polyphyletic with respect to the Saicinae and Visayanocorinae. Additionally, the Emesini and Ploiariolini were not supported as monophyletic groups. The taxonomy of the group is thus in doubt.
