= List of Oncocephalus species =

These 209 species belong to Oncocephalus, a genus of assassin bugs in the family Reduviidae.

== Oncocephalus species ==
- Oncocephalus acutangulus Reuter, 1882 (Africa and Europe & Northern Asia)
- Oncocephalus afghanus Hoberlandt, 1961 (Europe & Northern Asia)
- Oncocephalus alberti Schouteden, 1931 (Africa)
- Oncocephalus albicostatus Kiritshenko, 1914 (Europe & Northern Asia)
- Oncocephalus albosetosus Villiers, 1971 (Africa)
- Oncocephalus amen Kirkaldy, 1905 (Australia)
- Oncocephalus angolensis Villiers, 1960 (Africa)
- Oncocephalus angulatus Reuter, 1882 (Africa)
- Oncocephalus angustatus Horváth, 1892 (Africa)
- Oncocephalus anniei Ambrose & Vennison, 1989 (Southern Asia)
- Oncocephalus annulipes Stål, 1855 (Africa and Southern Asia)
- Oncocephalus annulirostris Reuter, 1882 (Africa)
- Oncocephalus antipodus Reuter, 1882 (the Caribbean Sea and South America)
- Oncocephalus apiculatus Reuter, 1882 (North America)
- Oncocephalus armipes Herrich-Schaeffer, 1850 (Africa)
- Oncocephalus asiranus Miller, 1954 (Europe & Northern Asia)
- Oncocephalus asper Miller, 1957 (Southern Asia)
- Oncocephalus aspericollis Reuter, 1882 (Europe & Northern Asia)
- Oncocephalus assimilis Reuter, 1882 (Southern Asia and temperate Asia)
- Oncocephalus astridae Schouteden, 1929 (Africa)
- Oncocephalus astutus Zhang et al., 1994
- Oncocephalus aterrimus Distant, 1909 (Southern Asia)
- Oncocephalus aurivillii Reuter, 1882 (Africa)
- Oncocephalus baghdadus Linnavuori, 1986 (Europe & Northern Asia)
- Oncocephalus baramensis Miller, 1940 (Southern Asia)
- Oncocephalus bastardi Villiers, 1948 (Africa)
- Oncocephalus bengalensis Y. C. Gupta & Kauntey, 2005 (Southern Asia)
- Oncocephalus beylensis Villiers, 1965 (Africa)
- Oncocephalus biclavatus Dispons, 1972 (Africa)
- Oncocephalus biguttula Horváth, 1901 (Europe & Northern Asia)
- Oncocephalus bipartitus Horváth, 1911 (Europe & Northern Asia)
- Oncocephalus bipunctatus Villiers, 1952 (Africa)
- Oncocephalus borneensis Miller, 1940 (Southern Asia)
- Oncocephalus bos Miller, 1940 (Southern Asia)
- Oncocephalus brachymerus Reuter, 1882 (Europe & Northern Asia)
- Oncocephalus breddini Miller, 1957 (Southern Asia)
- Oncocephalus breviscutum Reuter, 1882 (Southern Asia)
- Oncocephalus buruensis Miller, 1954 (Southern Asia)
- Oncocephalus calcaratus Dispons, 1972 (Africa)
- Oncocephalus celator Miller, 1948 (Southern Asia)
- Oncocephalus chamundcus Livingstone & Ravichandran, 1989 (Southern Asia)
- Oncocephalus cincticrus Reuter, 1882 (Africa)
- Oncocephalus cingalensis Walker, 1873 (Southern Asia)
- Oncocephalus clairi Schouteden, 1951 (Africa)
- Oncocephalus clavipes Hesse, 1925 (Africa)
- Oncocephalus cliens Miller, 1956 (Africa)
- Oncocephalus coartatus Dispons, 1972 (Africa)
- Oncocephalus collarti Schouteden, 1931 (Africa)
- Oncocephalus confusus Reuter, 1882 (Australia)
- Oncocephalus crassus Dispons, 1972 (Africa)
- Oncocephalus curvirostris Moulet, 2003 (Europe & Northern Asia)
- Oncocephalus curvispina Reuter, 1882 (Australia)
- Oncocephalus dasycnemis Reuter, 1882 (Africa)
- Oncocephalus demangei Villiers, 1968 (Africa)
- Oncocephalus dilatatus Reuter, 1882 (Africa)
- Oncocephalus disparilis Miller, 1948 (Southern Asia)
- Oncocephalus dubius Miller, 1957 (Southern Asia)
- Oncocephalus duvivieri Schouteden, 1913 (Africa)
- Oncocephalus electissimus Dispons, 1972 (Africa)
- Oncocephalus elegans Villiers, 1948 (Africa)
- Oncocephalus emmerizi Villiers, 1961 (Africa)
- Oncocephalus enallus Swanson, 2017 (Southern Asia)
- Oncocephalus erectus Van Duzee, 1923 (Central America)
- Oncocephalus felix Miller, 1956 (Africa)
- Oncocephalus femoratus Reuter, 1882 (Southern Asia)
- Oncocephalus fleutiauxi Villiers, 1948 (Africa)
- Oncocephalus fokkeri Horváth, 1896 (Africa and Europe & Northern Asia)
- Oncocephalus funeralis Distant, 1919 (Southern Asia)
- Oncocephalus fuscescens Reuter, 1882 (Africa)
- Oncocephalus fuscicornis Reuter, 1882 (Australia)
- Oncocephalus fuscinotum Reuter, 1882 (Southern Asia)
- Oncocephalus fuscipes Reuter, 1882 (Australia)
- Oncocephalus fuscirostris Stål, 1874 (Australia)
- Oncocephalus ganalensis Schouteden, 1906 (Australia)
- Oncocephalus gedrosiae Dispons, 1964 (Europe & Northern Asia)
- Oncocephalus geniculatus (Stål, 1872) (Central America and North America)
- Oncocephalus germari Reuter, 1882 (Southern Asia)
- Oncocephalus gillonae Villiers, 1965 (Africa)
- Oncocephalus gilvostriatus Moulet, 2005 (Europe & Northern Asia)
- Oncocephalus gryps Miller, 1948 (Southern Asia)
- Oncocephalus gularis Reuter, 1882 (Europe & Northern Asia)
- Oncocephalus gutturosus Dispons, 1965 (Europe & Northern Asia)
- Oncocephalus heissi Ishikawa, Cai & Tomokuni, 2006 (Southern Asia)
- Oncocephalus herzi (Jakovlev, 1893) (Europe & Northern Asia)
- Oncocephalus hierosolymensis Moulet, 2001 (Europe & Northern Asia)
- Oncocephalus hirsutus Giacchi, 1984 (South America)
- Oncocephalus ifanus Villiers, 1963 (Africa)
- Oncocephalus iguchii Iguchi, 1908 (Southern Asia)
- Oncocephalus impavidus Miller, 1948 (Southern Asia)
- Oncocephalus impexus Miller, 1948 (Southern Asia)
- Oncocephalus impictipes Jakovlev, 1885 (Europe & Northern Asia)
- Oncocephalus impudicus Reuter, 1882 (Southern Asia)
- Oncocephalus impurus Hsiao, 1977 (Southern Asia)
- Oncocephalus infuscatus Giacchi, 1984 (South America)
- Oncocephalus insignis Gerstaecker, 1892 (Africa)
- Oncocephalus internuntius Giacchi, 1984 (Central America)
- Oncocephalus israelensis Moulet, 2001 (Europe & Northern Asia)
- Oncocephalus jakowleffi Bergroth, 1890 (Europe & Northern Asia)
- Oncocephalus kerkvoordeae Schouteden, 1951 (Africa)
- Oncocephalus klugi Distant, 1904 (Southern Asia)
- Oncocephalus lagaei Schouteden, 1951 (Africa)
- Oncocephalus langkawiensis Miller, 1940 (Southern Asia)
- Oncocephalus larvaeformis Villiers, 1964 (Africa)
- Oncocephalus leopoldi Schouteden, 1929 (Africa)
- Oncocephalus lineosus Distant, 1904 (Southern Asia)
- Oncocephalus linnavuorii Moulet, 2001 (Europe & Northern Asia)
- Oncocephalus luluae Schouteden, 1951 (Africa)
- Oncocephalus lutulentus Miller, 1956 (Africa)
- Oncocephalus magnus Moulet, 2003 (Europe & Northern Asia)
- Oncocephalus maiusculus Giacchi, 1984 (South America)
- Oncocephalus maroccanus Wagner, 1961 (Africa)
- Oncocephalus mesopotamicus Dispons, 1970 (Europe & Northern Asia)
- Oncocephalus micropterus Horváth, 1889 (Southern Asia)
- Oncocephalus milleri Lindberg, 1953 (Africa)
- Oncocephalus milloti Villiers, 1948 (Africa)
- Oncocephalus minimus Miller, 1950 (Africa)
- Oncocephalus mirei Villiers, 1960 (Africa and Europe & Northern Asia)
- Oncocephalus misellus Dispons, 1968 (Southern Asia)
- Oncocephalus mitis Ren, 1985 (Southern Asia)
- Oncocephalus mochis Maldonado, 1995 (Central America)
- Oncocephalus modestus Reuter, 1882 (Southern Asia)
- Oncocephalus montalbanus Miller, 1948 (Southern Asia)
- Oncocephalus morosus Distant, 1904 (Southern Asia)
- Oncocephalus muelleri Mancini, 1946 (Africa)
- Oncocephalus mygdonius Dispons, 1968 (Europe & Northern Asia)
- Oncocephalus naboides Walker, 1873 (Southern Asia)
- Oncocephalus nigricollis Horváth, 1911 (Africa)
- Oncocephalus nigricornis Linnavuori, 1986 (Europe & Northern Asia)
- Oncocephalus nigrispinus Stål, 1870 (Southern Asia)
- Oncocephalus nimbensis Villiers, 1948 (Africa)
- Oncocephalus notatus (Klug, 1830) (Africa, Europe & Asia)
- Oncocephalus nubilus Van Duzee, 1914 (Central America and North America)
- Oncocephalus obscurus Reuter, 1882 (Africa)
- Oncocephalus obsoletus (Klug, 1830) (Africa and Europe & Northern Asia)
- Oncocephalus ocularis Horváth, 1898 (Europe & Northern Asia)
- Oncocephalus ovatus Villiers, 1961 (Africa)
- Oncocephalus pacificus Kirkaldy, 1908 (Assassin bug) (Oceania)
- Oncocephalus paganus Miller, 1957 (Southern Asia)
- Oncocephalus painei Miller, 1940 (Southern Asia)
- Oncocephalus parvulus Reuter, 1882 (Africa)
- Oncocephalus paternus P. Putshkov, 1984 (Europe & Northern Asia)
- Oncocephalus pauliani Villiers, 1961 (Africa)
- Oncocephalus pauper Schouteden, 1913 (Africa)
- Oncocephalus peninsularis Maldonado, 1995 (Central America)
- Oncocephalus pennatulus Dispons, 1962 (Europe & Northern Asia)
- Oncocephalus pericarti Moulet, 2001 (Europe & Northern Asia)
- Oncocephalus philippinus Lethierry, 1877 (Southern Asia and temperate Asia)
- Oncocephalus picturatus Distant, 1904 (Southern Asia)
- Oncocephalus pilicornis Reuter, 1882 (Africa and Europe & Northern Asia)
- Oncocephalus pilosulus Reuter, 1882 (Southern Asia)
- Oncocephalus plumicornis (Germar, 1822) (Europe & Northern Asia)
- Oncocephalus plumipes Puton, 1884 (Africa)
- Oncocephalus posthi Villiers, 1948 (Africa)
- Oncocephalus pubiventris Miller, 1950 (Africa)
- Oncocephalus pudicus Hsiao, 1977 (Southern Asia)
- Oncocephalus purus Hsiao, 1977 (Southern Asia)
- Oncocephalus pusillus Miller, 1956 (Africa)
- Oncocephalus putoni Reuter, 1882 (Africa and Europe & Northern Asia)
- Oncocephalus quadrivittatus Giacchi & Maldonado, 1983 (Central America)
- Oncocephalus quinquedecimspinulosus Reuter, 1882 (Africa)
- Oncocephalus quotidianus Bergroth, 1916 (Australia)
- Oncocephalus regulus Miller, 1956 (Africa)
- Oncocephalus remaudierei Villiers, 1954 (Africa)
- Oncocephalus ribesi Moulet, 2011 (Europe & Northern Asia)
- Oncocephalus rodhaini Schouteden, 1931 (Africa)
- Oncocephalus rutshuricus Schouteden, 1944 (Africa)
- Oncocephalus sahelensis Villiers, 1948 (Africa)
- Oncocephalus sarawakensis Miller, 1940 (Southern Asia)
- Oncocephalus scaber Miller, 1948 (Southern Asia)
- Oncocephalus schioedtei Reuter, 1882 (Southern Asia)
- Oncocephalus schmitzi Villiers, 1972 (Africa)
- Oncocephalus schoutedeni Villiers, 1960 (Africa)
- Oncocephalus scutellaris Reuter, 1882 (Southern Asia)
- Oncocephalus semiramidae Kirkaldy, 1910 (Southern Asia)
- Oncocephalus signoreti Reuter, 1882 (Africa)
- Oncocephalus simillimus Reuter, 1888 (Europe & Northern Asia and Southern Asia)
- Oncocephalus sordidus Stål, 1855 (Africa)
- Oncocephalus spec Horvath, 1893
- Oncocephalus squalidus (Rossi, 1790) (Africa and Europe & Northern Asia)
- Oncocephalus stalii Wallengren, 1875 (Africa)
- Oncocephalus straeleni Villiers, 1954 (Africa)
- Oncocephalus striaticollis Villiers, 1964 (Africa)
- Oncocephalus striatus Villiers, 1960 (Africa)
- Oncocephalus stysi Moulet, 2008 (Europe & Northern Asia)
- Oncocephalus subangulatus Villiers, 1961 (Africa)
- Oncocephalus subspinosus (Amyot & Serville, 1843) (Africa)
- Oncocephalus sufflavus Villiers, 1952 (Africa)
- Oncocephalus taurus Miller, 1940 (Southern Asia)
- Oncocephalus termezanus Kiritshenko, 1914 (Europe & Northern Asia)
- Oncocephalus thoracatus Dispons, 1972 (Africa)
- Oncocephalus thoracicus Fieber, 1861 (Europe & Northern Asia)
- Oncocephalus tibialis Reuter, 1882 (Australia)
- Oncocephalus trichocnemis Horváth, 1911 (Europe & Northern Asia)
- Oncocephalus trochantericus Bergroth, 1914 (Africa)
- Oncocephalus validispinis Reuter, 1882 (the Caribbean Sea, North America, and South America)
- Oncocephalus vaneyeni Schouteden, 1951 (Africa)
- Oncocephalus variabilis Maldonado, 1995 (North America)
- Oncocephalus variegatus Reuter, 1882 (Africa)
- Oncocephalus vaulogeri Montandon, 1892 (Africa and Europe & Northern Asia)
- Oncocephalus velutinus (Montandon, 1865) (Australia)
- Oncocephalus ventralis Walker, 1873 (the Caribbean Sea)
- Oncocephalus vescerae Dispons, 1965 (Africa and Europe & Northern Asia)
- Oncocephalus viator Miller, 1950 (Africa)
- Oncocephalus vicinalis Dispons, 1968 (Africa)
- Oncocephalus wangi (Ren, 1992) (Southern Asia)
- Oncocephalus wittei Schouteden, 1944 (Africa)
- Oncocephalus yashpali Livingstone & Ravichandran, 1989 (Southern Asia)
- Oncocephalus zavattarii Mancini, 1939 (Africa)
- Oncocephalus zumpti Schouteden, 1943 (Africa)
