= Diaditus =

Scientific classification
- Kingdom: Animalia
- Phylum: Arthropoda
- Clade: Pancrustacea
- Class: Insecta
- Order: Hemiptera
- Suborder: Heteroptera
- Family: Reduviidae
- Subfamily: Stenopodainae
- Genus: Diaditus; Stål, 1859

Genus of true bugs

Diaditus is a genus of assassin bugs in the family Reduviidae. There are about six described species in Diaditus.

== Species ==
These six species belong to the genus Diaditus:

- Diaditus latulus Barber, 1930
- Diaditus nocturnus Hussey, 1954
- Diaditus pictipes Champion, 1898
- Diaditus pilosicornis Bergroth, 1907
- Diaditus semicolon Stål, 1859
- Diaditus tejanus Giacchi, 1980
