= Duriocoris =

Scientific classification
- Kingdom: Animalia
- Phylum: Arthropoda
- Class: Insecta
- Order: Hemiptera
- Suborder: Heteroptera
- Family: Reduviidae
- Subfamily: Stenopodainae
- Genus: Duriocoris; Miller

Genus of true bugs

Duriocoris is a genus within the subfamily Stenopodainae of Reduviidae. 3 species are known from China.

== Partial list of species ==
- Duriocoris geniculatus 2005
