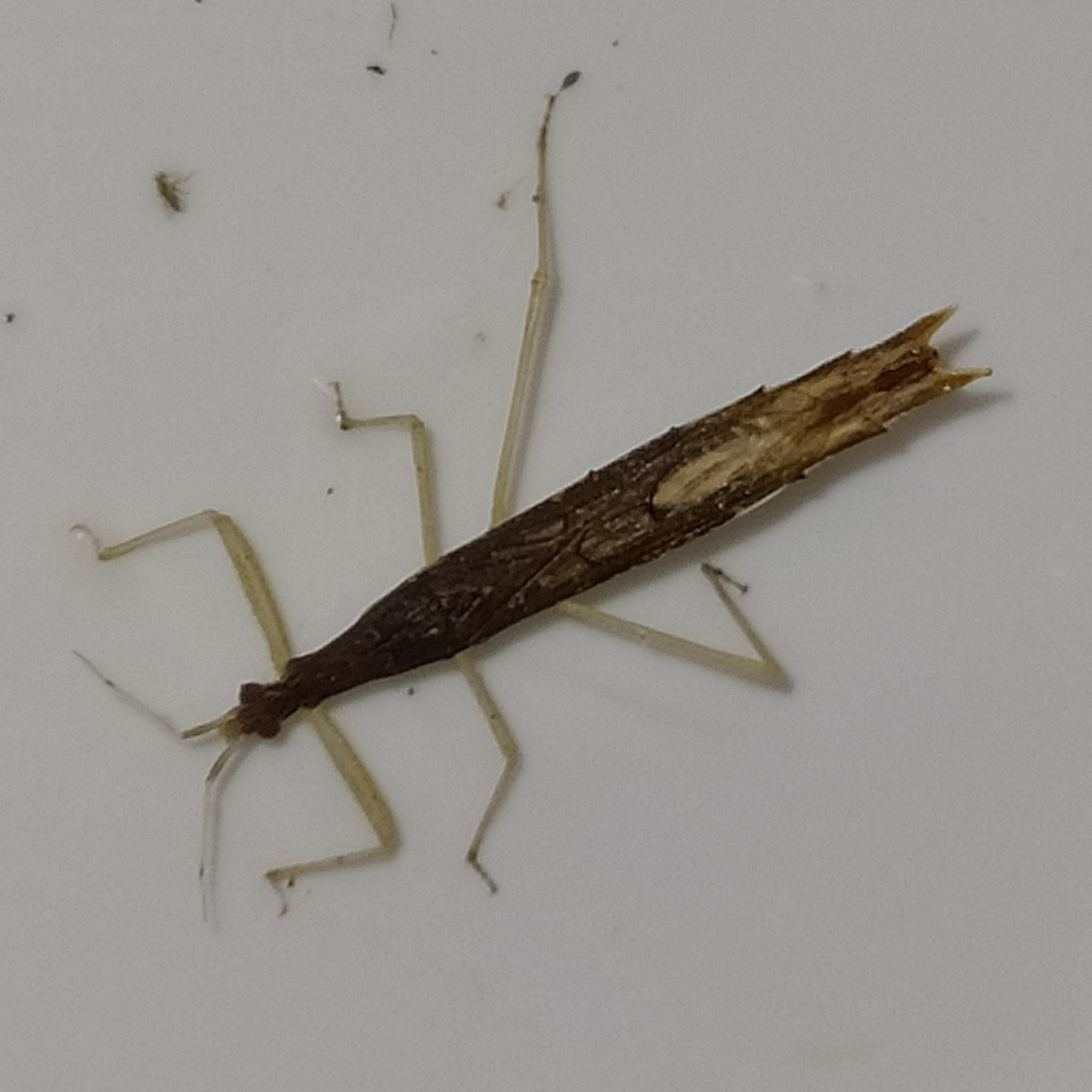
- Ctenotrachelus kwataensis

Scientific classification
- Kingdom: Animalia
- Phylum: Arthropoda
- Clade: Pancrustacea
- Class: Insecta
- Order: Hemiptera
- Suborder: Heteroptera
- Family: Reduviidae
- Subfamily: Stenopodainae
- Genus: Ctenotrachelus; Stål, 1868

= Ctenotrachelus =

Genus of true bugs

Ctenotrachelus is a genus of assassin bugs in the family Reduviidae. There are more than 20 described species in the genus Ctenotrachelus.

== Species ==
These 21 species belong to the genus Ctenotrachelus:

- Ctenotrachelus acarinatus Maldonado, 1995-01
- Ctenotrachelus achilloides Bérenger, 2001-01
- Ctenotrachelus acutus Barber, 1930
- Ctenotrachelus elongatus Barber, 1930
- Ctenotrachelus esuriens Hussey, 1954
- Ctenotrachelus infuscatus Barber, 1930
- Ctenotrachelus kwataensis Bérenger, 2001-01
- Ctenotrachelus lobatus Barber, 1930
- Ctenotrachelus longicollis (Walker, 1873)
- Ctenotrachelus macilentus Stål, 1872
- Ctenotrachelus mexicanus (Champion, 1898)
- Ctenotrachelus minor Barber, 1929
- Ctenotrachelus moraguesi Bérenger, 2001-01
- Ctenotrachelus orbiculatus Bérenger, 2001-01
- Ctenotrachelus pallidopodus Maldonado, 1955
- Ctenotrachelus ranchoensis Maldonado, 1974
- Ctenotrachelus setulosus Barber, 1930
- Ctenotrachelus shermani Barber, 1930
- Ctenotrachelus striatus Barber, 1930
- Ctenotrachelus testaceus Barber, 1929
- Ctenotrachelus vescoi Bérenger, 2001-01
