= Pnirontis infirma =

Scientific classification
- Kingdom: Animalia
- Phylum: Arthropoda
- Clade: Pancrustacea
- Class: Insecta
- Order: Hemiptera
- Suborder: Heteroptera
- Family: Reduviidae
- Genus: Pnirontis
- Species: P. infirma

Binomial name
- Pnirontis infirma Stål, 1859

Species of true bug

Pnirontis infirma is a species of assassin bug in the family Reduviidae. It is found in the Caribbean Sea, Central America, North America, and South America.
