= Diaditus pictipes =

Scientific classification
- Domain: Eukaryota
- Kingdom: Animalia
- Phylum: Arthropoda
- Class: Insecta
- Order: Hemiptera
- Suborder: Heteroptera
- Family: Reduviidae
- Genus: Diaditus
- Species: D. pictipes

Binomial name
- Diaditus pictipes Champion, 1898

Species of true bug

Diaditus pictipes is a species of assassin bug in the family Reduviidae. It is found in the Caribbean Sea, Central America, and North America.
