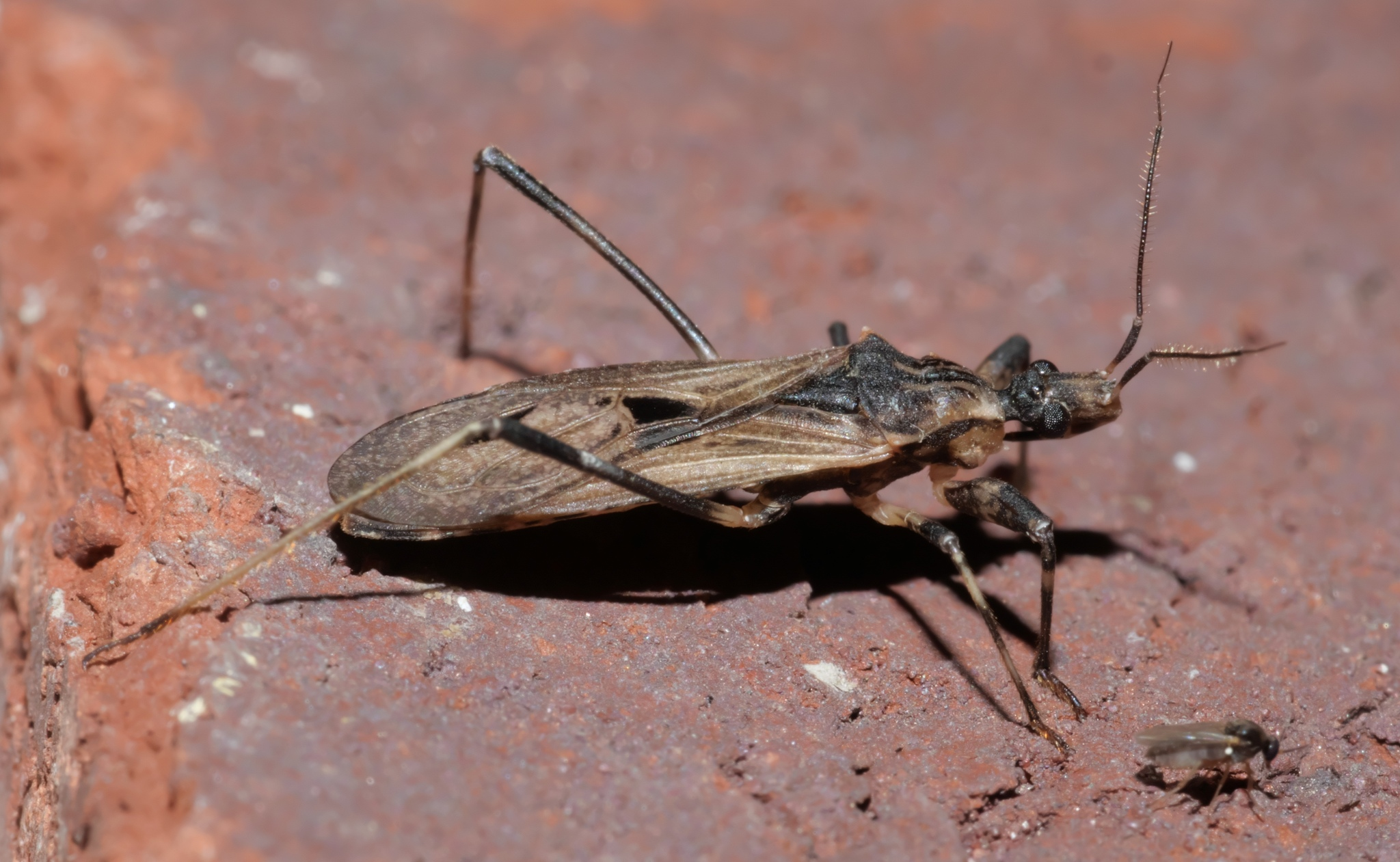
- Oncocephalus geniculatus, Oklahoma

Scientific classification
- Kingdom: Animalia
- Phylum: Arthropoda
- Clade: Pancrustacea
- Class: Insecta
- Order: Hemiptera
- Suborder: Heteroptera
- Family: Reduviidae
- Genus: Oncocephalus
- Species: O. geniculatus

Binomial name
- Oncocephalus geniculatus (Stål, 1872)

= Oncocephalus geniculatus =

Species of true bug

Oncocephalus geniculatus is a species of assassin bug in the family Reduviidae. It is found in Central America and North America.
