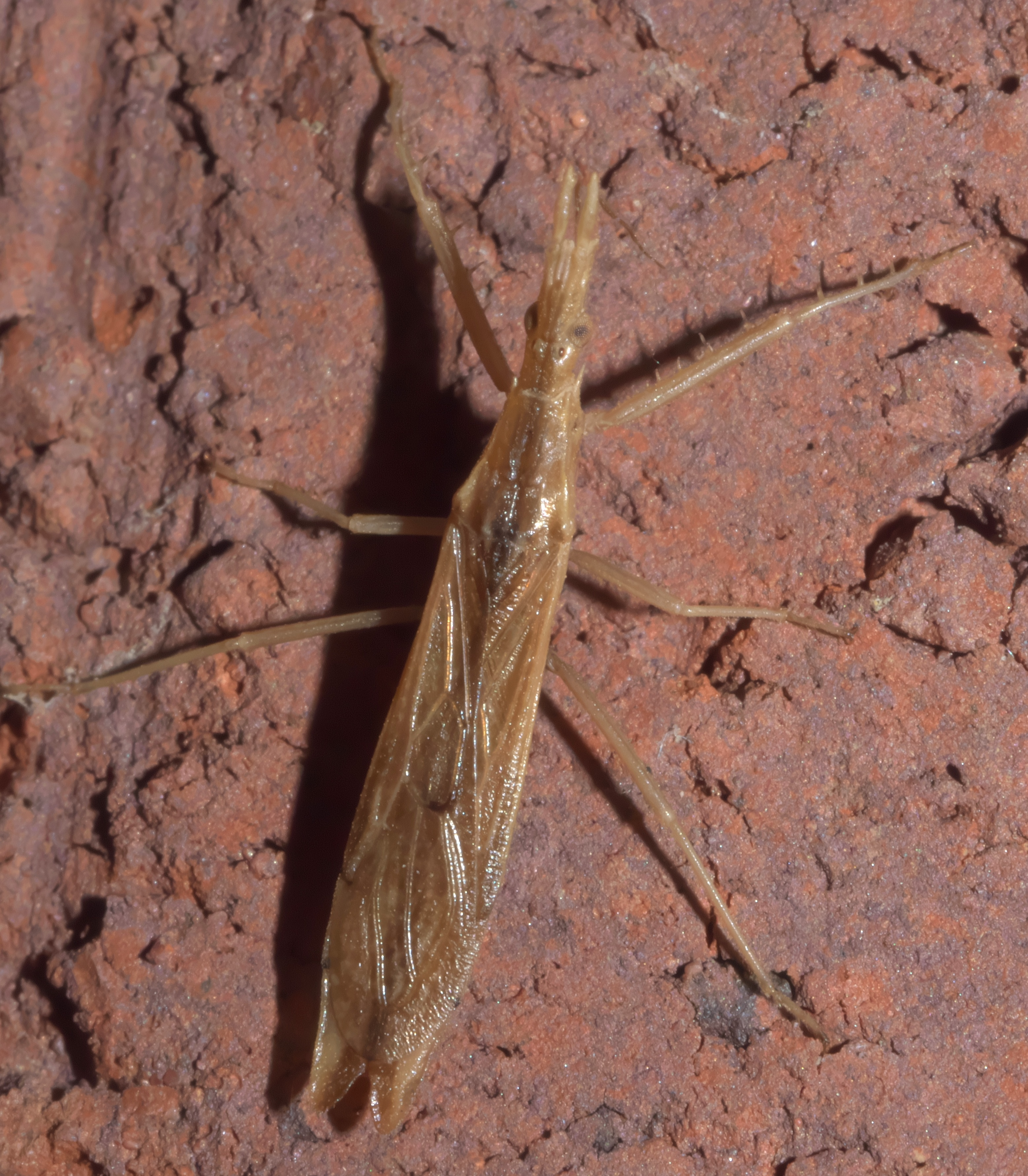
- Pnirontis modesta

Scientific classification
- Kingdom: Animalia
- Phylum: Arthropoda
- Clade: Pancrustacea
- Class: Insecta
- Order: Hemiptera
- Suborder: Heteroptera
- Family: Reduviidae
- Subfamily: Stenopodainae
- Genus: Pnirontis; Stål, 1859

= Pnirontis =

Genus of true bugs

Pnirontis is a genus of assassin bugs in the family Reduviidae. There are more than 30 described species in Pnirontis.

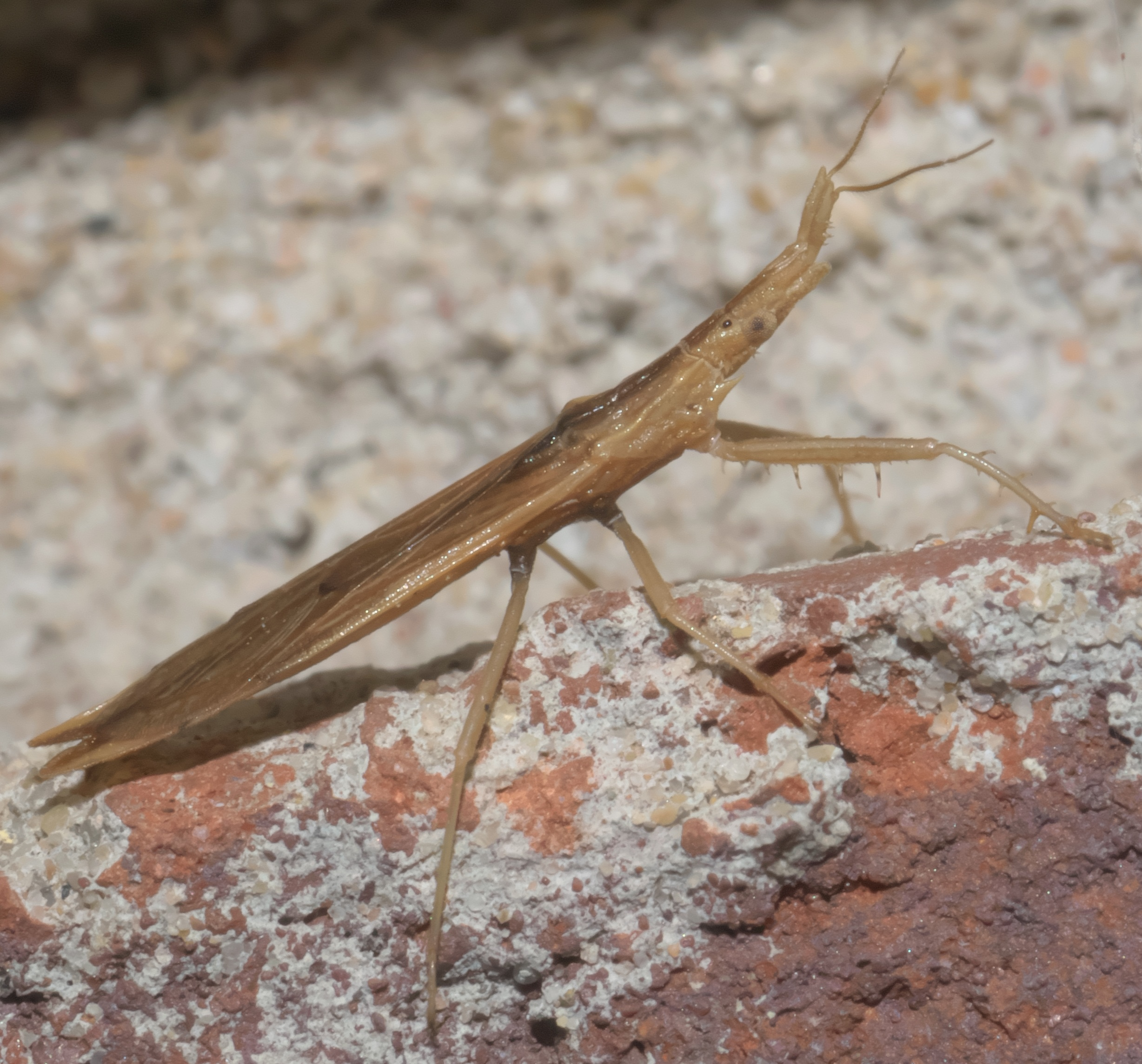
Pnirontis modesta

== Species ==
These 37 species belong to the genus Pnirontis:

- Pnirontis acuminata Barber, 1929
- Pnirontis barberi Hussey, 1954
- Pnirontis beieri Wygodzinsky, 1948
- Pnirontis bellatrix Hussey, 1954
- Pnirontis brevispina Barber, 1929
- Pnirontis brimleyi Blatchley, 1926
- Pnirontis buenoi (Lima & Seabra, 1945)
- Pnirontis demerarae Haviland, 1931
- Pnirontis edentula (Berg, 1879)
- Pnirontis elongata Barber, 1929
- Pnirontis filiformis (Walker, 1873)
- Pnirontis grandis Maldonado, 1994-01
- Pnirontis granulosa Barber, 1930
- Pnirontis grisea Barber, 1929
- Pnirontis guggiarii Hussey, 1954
- Pnirontis heminigra Maldonado, 1986
- Pnirontis incerta Reuter, 1887
- Pnirontis infirma Stål, 1859
- Pnirontis inobtrusa Barber, 1929
- Pnirontis languida Stål, 1859
- Pnirontis lissa Maldonado, 1986
- Pnirontis modesta Banks, 1910
- Pnirontis pallescens Stål, 1859
- Pnirontis perpugnax (Torre Bueno, 1914)
- Pnirontis scorpiona Berg
- Pnirontis scorpionia (Berg, 1879)
- Pnirontis scutellaris Stål, 1859
- Pnirontis selecta Barber, 1929
- Pnirontis serripes (Fabricius, 1803)
- Pnirontis sicki Wygodzinsky, 1947
- Pnirontis similis Barber, 1929
- Pnirontis spinimanus Champion, 1898
- Pnirontis spinosissima (Kolenati, 1857)
- Pnirontis stali (Mayr, 1865)
- Pnirontis subinermis Barber, 1929
- Pnirontis uroquadratus Giacchi, 1996-01
- Pnirontis zikani (Lima & Seabra, 1945)
