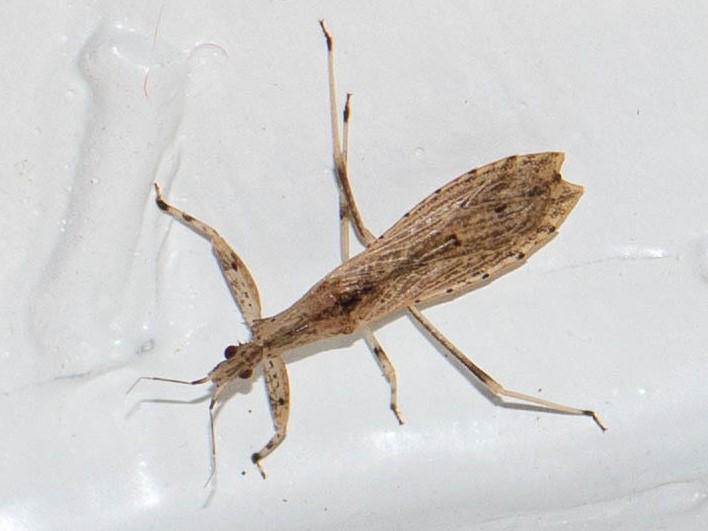

Scientific classification
- Kingdom: Animalia
- Phylum: Arthropoda
- Class: Insecta
- Order: Hemiptera
- Suborder: Heteroptera
- Family: Reduviidae
- Genus: Ctenotrachelus
- Species: C. shermani

Binomial name
- Ctenotrachelus shermani Barber, 1930

= Ctenotrachelus shermani =

Species of true bug

Ctenotrachelus shermani is a species of assassin bug in the family Reduviidae. It is found in the Caribbean, North America, and South America.
