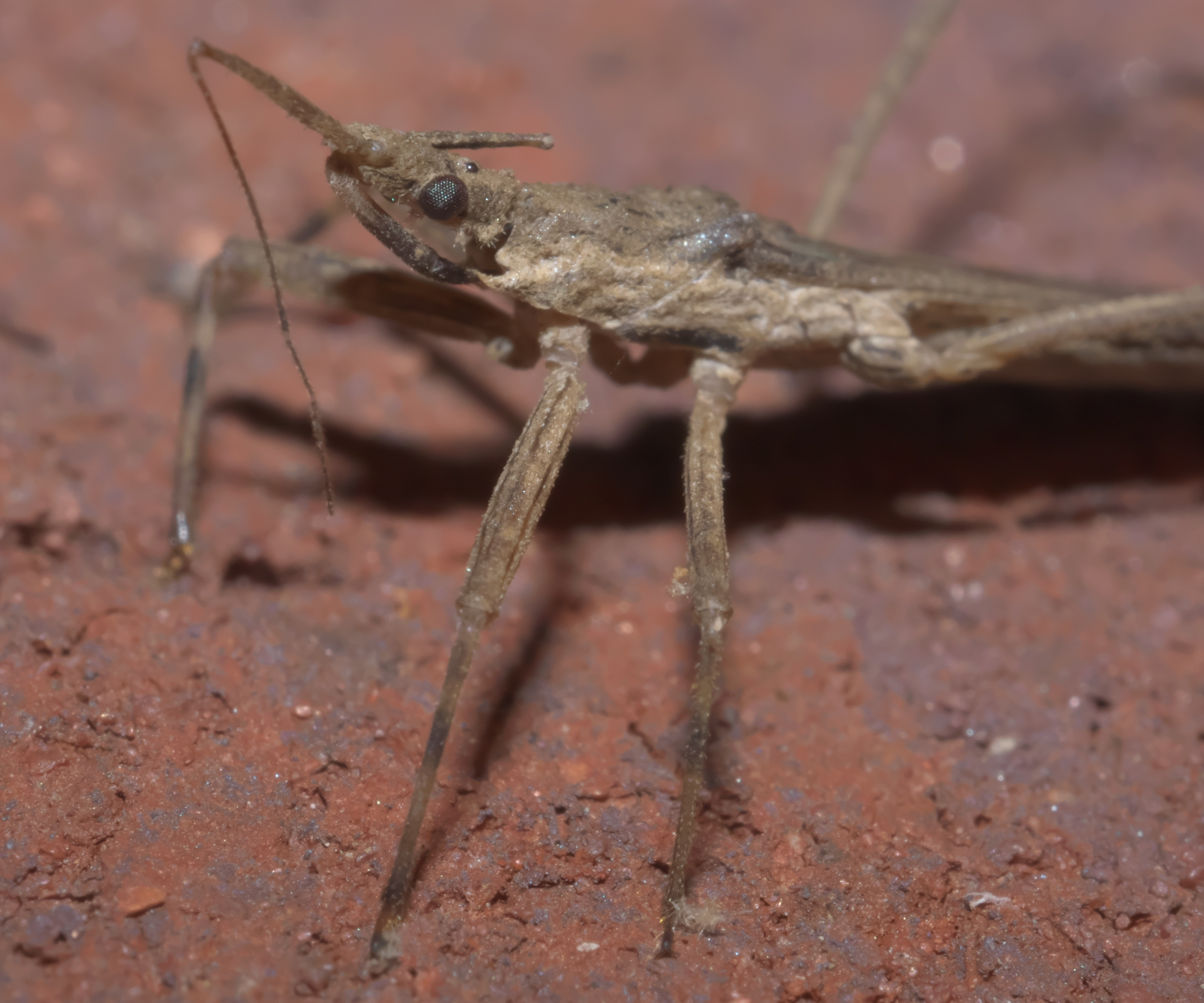

Scientific classification
- Domain: Eukaryota
- Kingdom: Animalia
- Phylum: Arthropoda
- Class: Insecta
- Order: Hemiptera
- Suborder: Heteroptera
- Family: Reduviidae
- Genus: Pygolampis
- Species: P. pectoralis

Binomial name
- Pygolampis pectoralis (Say, 1832)

= Pygolampis pectoralis =

Species of true bug

Pygolampis pectoralis is a species of assassin bug in the family Reduviidae. It is found in the Caribbean Sea and North America.

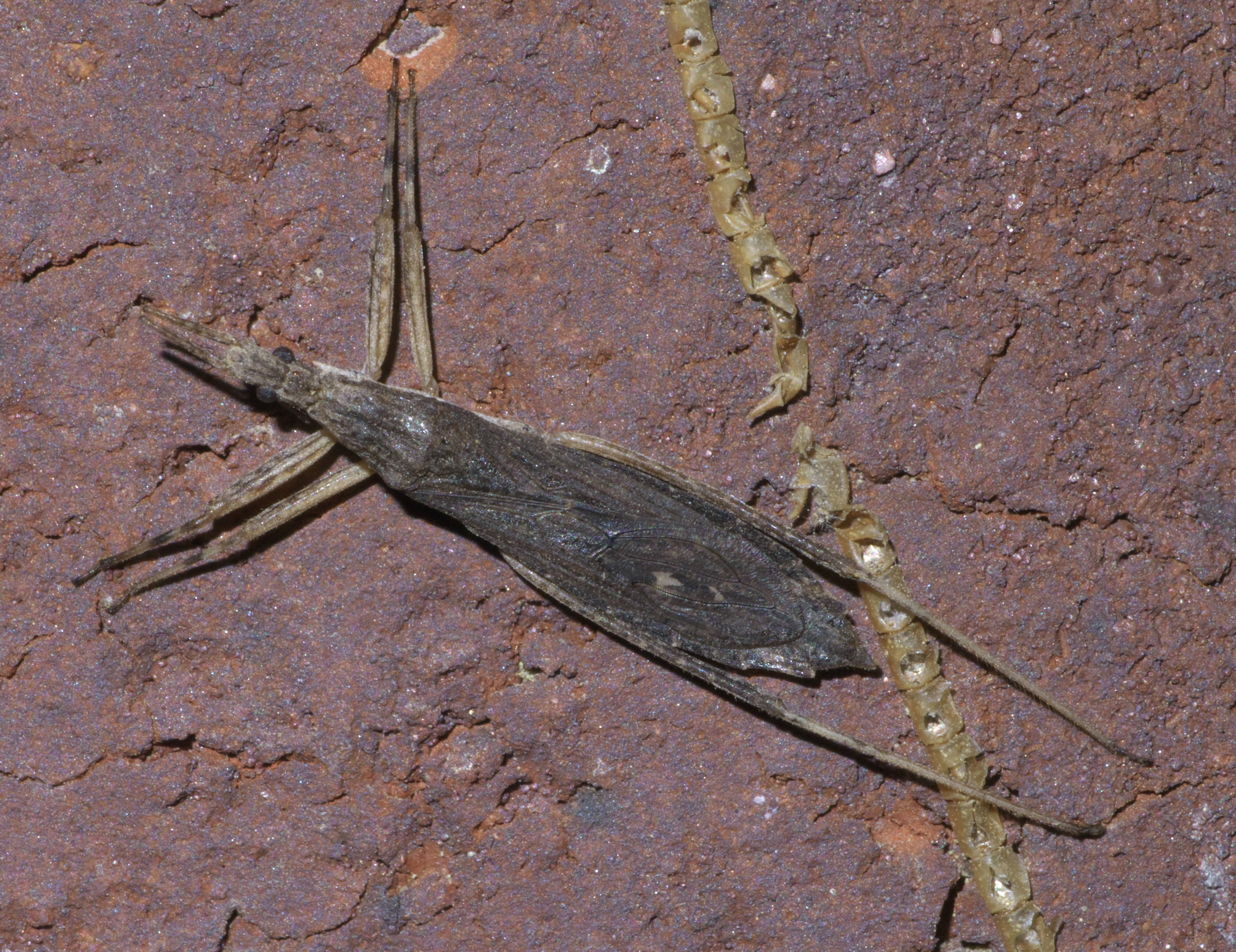
