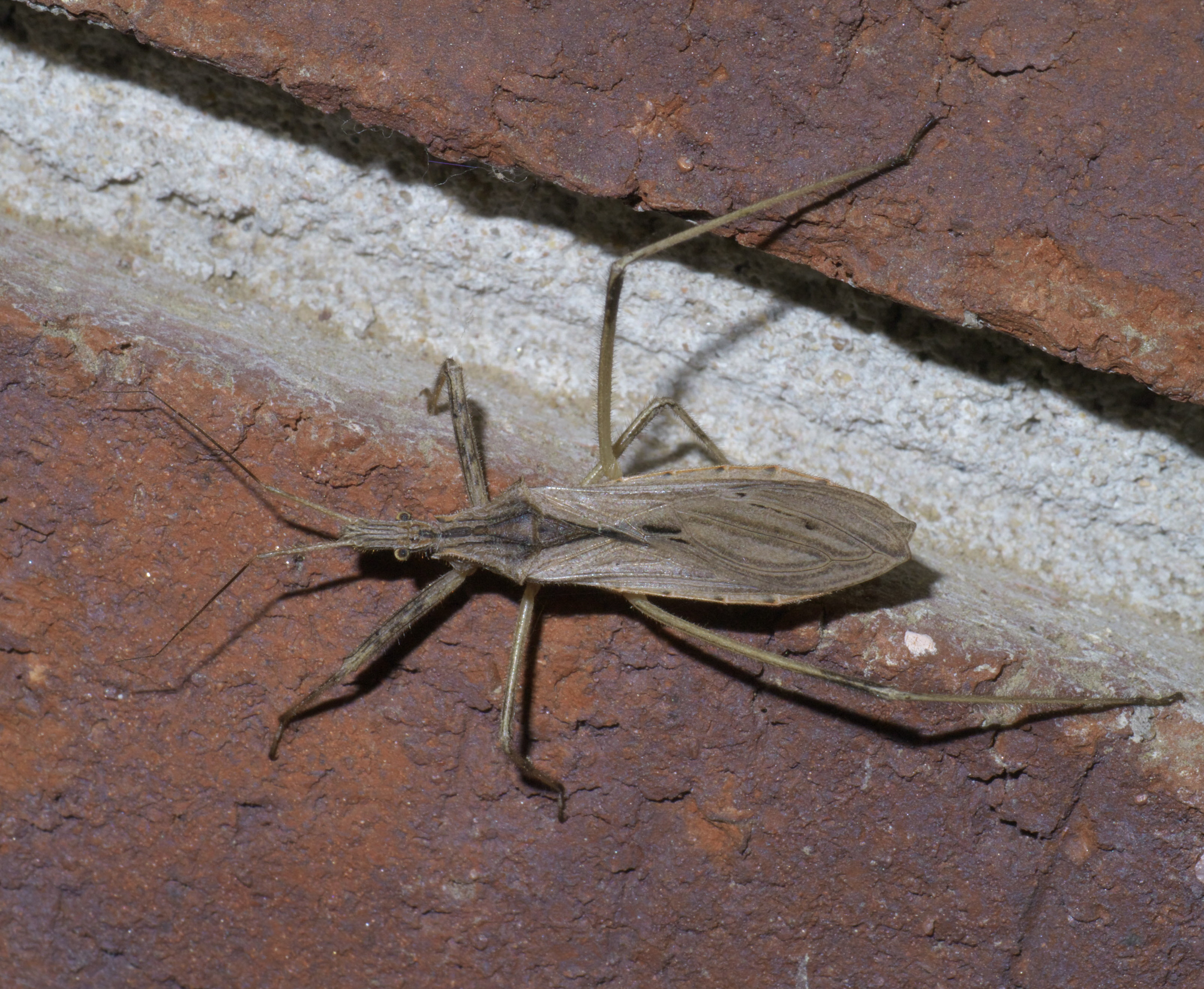
- Stenopoda spinulosa

Scientific classification
- Kingdom: Animalia
- Phylum: Arthropoda
- Class: Insecta
- Order: Hemiptera
- Suborder: Heteroptera
- Family: Reduviidae
- Subfamily: Stenopodainae
- Genus: Stenopoda; Laporte, 1832

Synonyms
- Stenopoda gracilis Heer, 1861; Stenopoda oeningensis Heer, 1861

= Stenopoda =

Genus of insects

Stenopoda is a genus of assassin bugs in the family Reduviidae. There are about 15 described species in Stenopoda, found in the Americas and Africa.

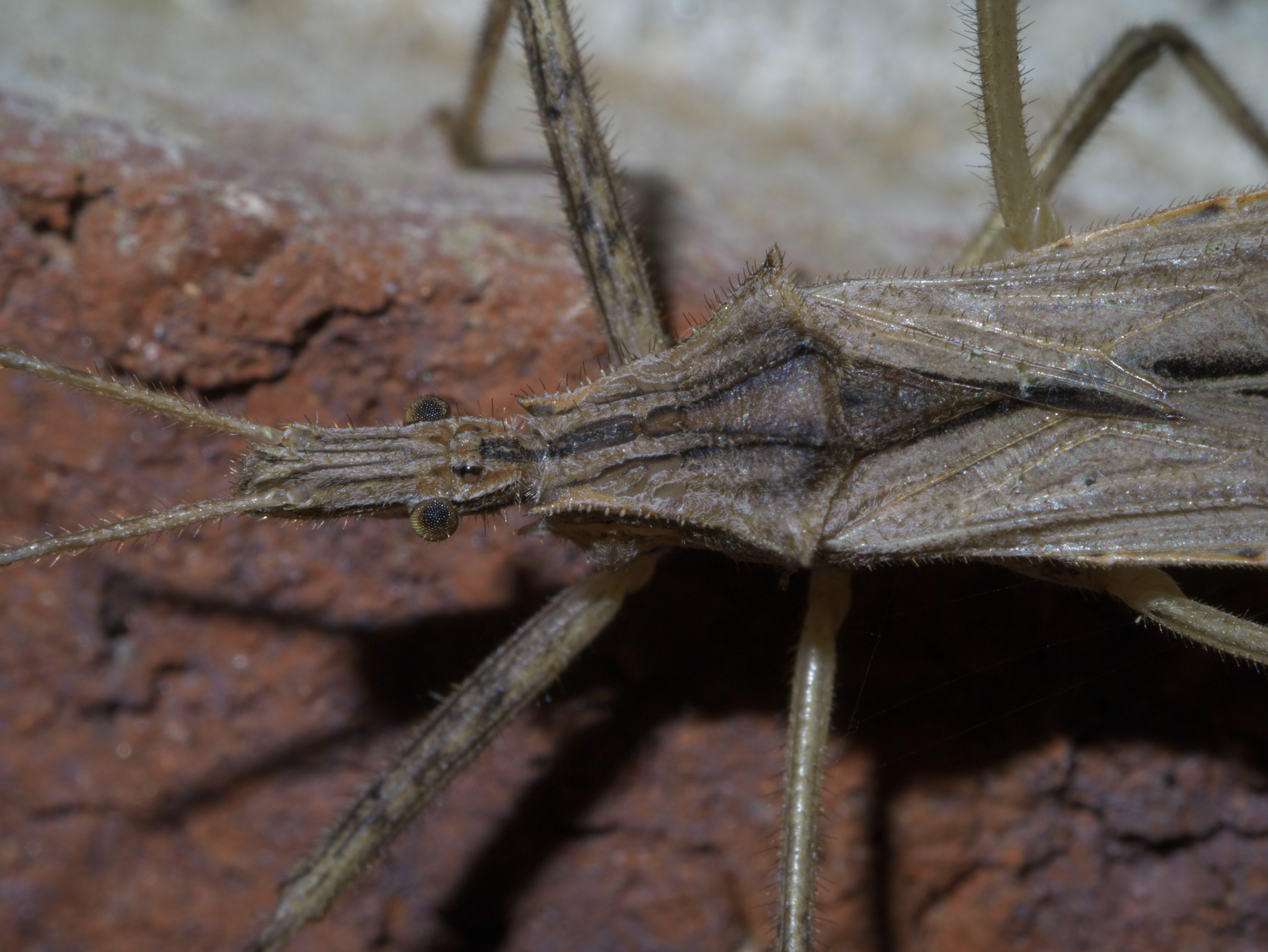
Stenopoda spinulosa

== Species ==
These 15 species belong to the genus Stenopoda:

- Stenopoda azteca Giacchi, 1969
- Stenopoda cana Stål, 1859
- Stenopoda cinerea Laporte, 1833
- Stenopoda flavida Giacchi, 1969
- Stenopoda fusca Germar, 1837
- Stenopoda guaranitica Giacchi, 1969
- Stenopoda lativentris Giacchi, 1969
- Stenopoda notoexpansa Giacchi, 1990
- Stenopoda pallida Giacchi, 1969
- Stenopoda scutellata Distant, 1891
- Stenopoda spec Laporte, 1775
- Stenopoda spinimarginata Maldonado, 1976
- Stenopoda spinulosa Giacchi, 1969
- Stenopoda subinermis Stål, 1859
- Stenopoda wygodzinskyi Giacchi, 1969
