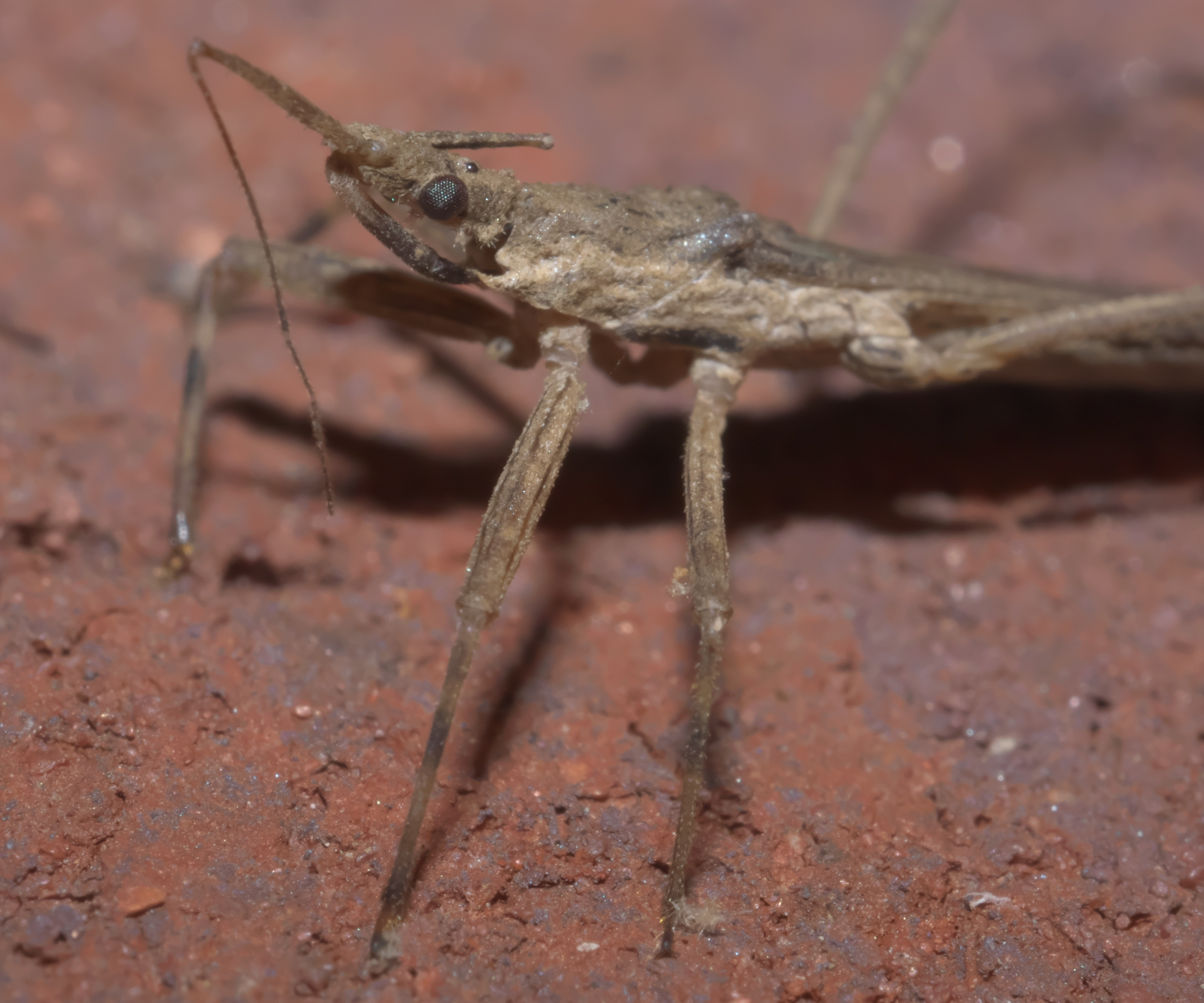
- Pygolampis pectoralis

Scientific classification
- Kingdom: Animalia
- Phylum: Arthropoda
- Class: Insecta
- Order: Hemiptera
- Suborder: Heteroptera
- Family: Reduviidae
- Subfamily: Stenopodainae
- Genus: Pygolampis; Germar, 1825

= Pygolampis =

Genus of true bugs

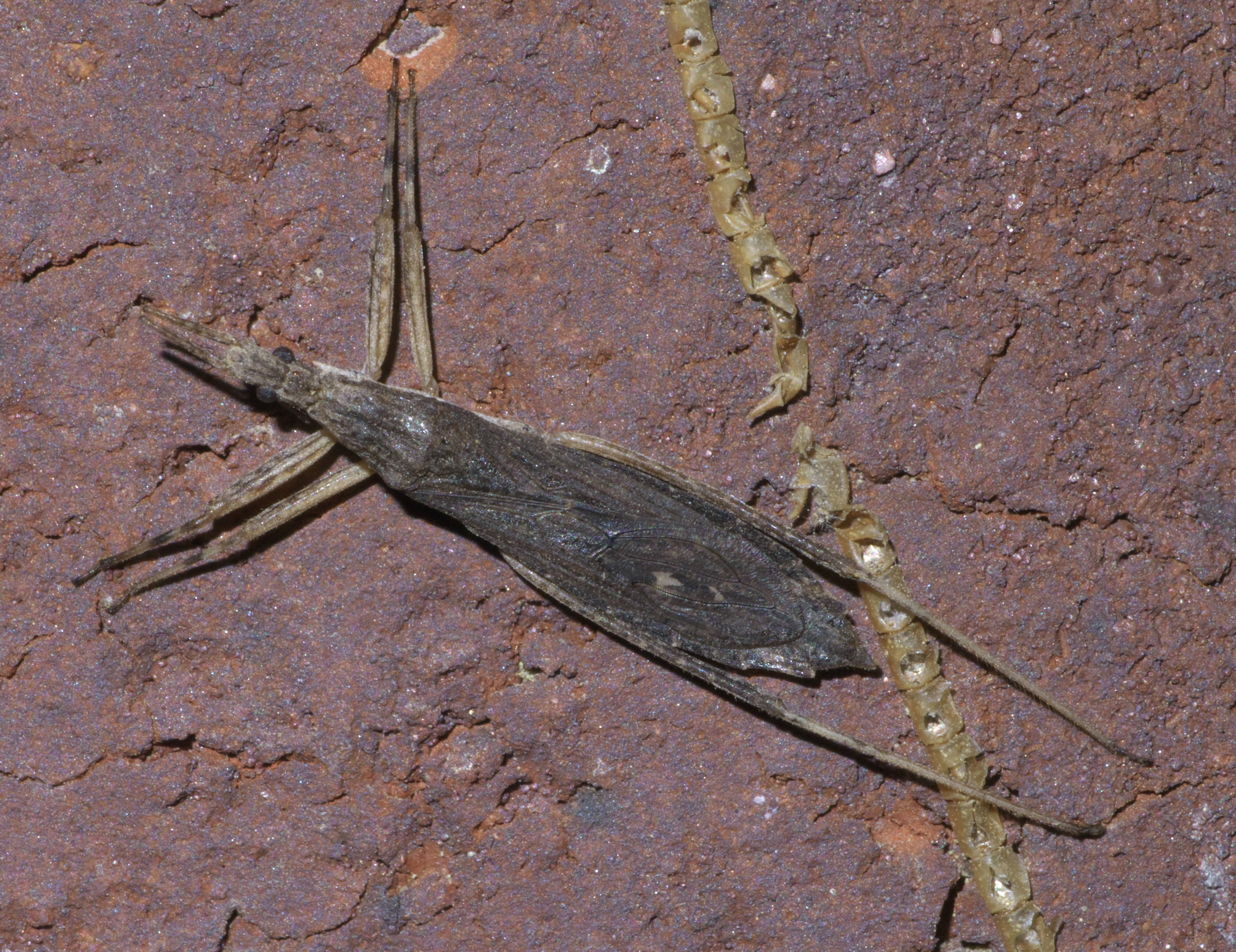
Pygolampis pectoralis

Pygolampis is a genus of assassin bugs in the family Reduviidae. More than 90 species have been described worldwide

== Species ==
These 91 species belong to the genus Pygolampis:

- Pygolampis acanthopus Kolenati, 1857 (Palearctic)
- Pygolampis aethiops Distant, 1902 (Africa)
- Pygolampis albomaculata Villiers, 1961 (Africa)
- Pygolampis angusta Hsiao, 1977 (Southern Asia)
- Pygolampis annulipes Villiers, 1963 (Africa)
- Pygolampis aptena Swanson, 2018
- Pygolampis atrolineata Barber, 1929 (South America)
- Pygolampis australis Walker, 1873 (Australia)
- Pygolampis bastardi Villiers, 1948 (Africa)
- Pygolampis bidentata (Goeze, 1778) (Africa, Europe, Asia)
- Pygolampis biguttata Reuter, 1887 (Southern Asia)
- Pygolampis breviptera Ren, 1981 (Southern Asia)
- Pygolampis brevis Villiers, 1948 (Africa)
- Pygolampis buaya Miller, 1940 (Southern Asia)
- Pygolampis buitenzorgenis Miller, 1940 (Southern Asia)
- Pygolampis carvalhoi Villiers, 1960 (Africa)
- Pygolampis comorensis Villiers, 1968 (Africa)
- Pygolampis concolor Walker, 1873 (Southern Asia)
- Pygolampis dartevelleii Schouteden, 1951 (Africa)
- Pygolampis duckei Lima & Seabra, 1945 (South America)
- Pygolampis fairmairei Bergroth, 1893 (Africa)
- Pygolampis foeda Stål, 1859 (Australia, Oceania, Southern Asia)
- Pygolampis frenchi Bergroth, 1895 (Australia)
- Pygolampis gerardi Schouteden, 1931 (Africa)
- Pygolampis gordoni Villiers, 1944 (Africa)
- Pygolampis gracilicornis Villiers, 1948 (Africa)
- Pygolampis griaulei Villiers, 1957 (Africa)
- Pygolampis griveaudi Villiers, 1961 (Africa)
- Pygolampis hulstaerti Villiers, 1964 (Africa)
- Pygolampis incerta Miller, 1940 (Southern Asia)
- Pygolampis inculta Miller, 1958 (Australia)
- Pygolampis jaegeri Villiers, 1971 (Africa)
- Pygolampis jor Miller, 1940 (Southern Asia)
- Pygolampis kabayuana Miller, 1940 (Southern Asia)
- Pygolampis kiauana Miller, 1940 (Southern Asia)
- Pygolampis kinchassae Bergroth, 1905 (Africa)
- Pygolampis kindiana Villiers, 1948 (Africa)
- Pygolampis langkawiensis Miller, 1940 (Southern Asia)
- Pygolampis laticaput Benedek, 1968 (Palearctic)
- Pygolampis leontovitchi Schouteden, 1951 (Africa)
- Pygolampis livingstoni Y. C. Gupta & Kauntey, 2007 (Southern Asia)
- Pygolampis lobata Villiers, 1948 (Africa)
- Pygolampis longipes Hsiao, 1977 (Southern Asia)
- Pygolampis macera Walker, 1873 (Southern Asia)
- Pygolampis machadoi Villiers, 1960 (Africa)
- Pygolampis macilenta Miller, 1940 (Southern Asia)
- Pygolampis madecassa Villiers, 1961 (Africa)
- Pygolampis mangenoti Villiers, 1959 (Africa)
- Pygolampis marginata Miller, 1950 (Africa)
- Pygolampis matogrossensis Lima & Seabra, 1945 (South America)
- Pygolampis microcephala Villiers, 1968 (Africa)
- Pygolampis montana Miller, 1940 (Southern Asia)
- Pygolampis moorei Miller, 1940 (Southern Asia)
- Pygolampis nigerrima Villiers, 1963 (Africa)
- Pygolampis noctivaga Miller, 1940 (Southern Asia)
- Pygolampis notabilis Miller, 1940 (Southern Asia)
- Pygolampis nyassae Distant, 1902 (Africa)
- Pygolampis pahangensis Miller, 1940 (Southern Asia)
- Pygolampis painei Miller, 1940 (Southern Asia)
- Pygolampis pectinata Bergroth, 1893 (Africa)
- Pygolampis pectoralis (Say, 1832) (North America)
- Pygolampis perinetensis Villiers, 1961 (Africa)
- Pygolampis piceipennis Villiers, 1961 (Africa)
- Pygolampis prolixa Stål, 1859 (Palearctic)
- Pygolampis richardi Schouteden, 1951 (Africa)
- Pygolampis ridleyi Miller, 1940 (Southern Asia)
- Pygolampis robinsoni Villiers, 1961 (Africa)
- Pygolampis rufescens Hsiao, 1977 (Southern Asia)
- Pygolampis satanas Villiers, 1952 (Africa)
- Pygolampis secreta Villiers, 1961 (Africa)
- Pygolampis sericea Stål, 1859 (North America)
- Pygolampis sigwalti Villiers, 1959 (Africa)
- Pygolampis simulipes Hsiao, 1977 (Southern Asia)
- Pygolampis spurca Stål, 1859 (South America)
- Pygolampis striata Miller, 1940 (Southern Asia)
- Pygolampis stricticephala Villiers, 1961 (Southern Asia)
- Pygolampis styx Miller, 1940 (Southern Asia)
- Pygolampis tigridis Dispons, 1970 (Palearctic)
- Pygolampis togoana Villiers, 1948 (Africa)
- Pygolampis torpida Miller, 1940 (Southern Asia)
- Pygolampis trepida Miller, 1940 (Southern Asia)
- Pygolampis tuberosa Tomokuni & Cai, 2003 (Southern Asia)
- Pygolampis ubangiensis Schouteden, 1951 (Africa)
- Pygolampis uelensis Villiers, 1964 (Africa)
- Pygolampis ugandensis Villiers, 1962 (Africa)
- Pygolampis unicolor Walker, 1873 (Southern Asia)
- Pygolampis vadoni Villiers, 1961 (Africa)
- Pygolampis vanderysti Schouteden, 1931 (Africa)
- Pygolampis vicinus Schouteden, 1931 (Africa)
- Pygolampis vilhenai Villiers, 1960 (Africa)
- Pygolampis wellmanni Schouteden, 1931 (Africa)

Five of these species have been observed in Vietnam: Pygolampis angusta, Pygolampis foeda, Pygolampis rufescens, Pygolampis simulipes, and Pygolampis tuberosa.
