= Narvesus =

Scientific classification
- Kingdom: Animalia
- Phylum: Arthropoda
- Clade: Pancrustacea
- Class: Insecta
- Order: Hemiptera
- Suborder: Heteroptera
- Family: Reduviidae
- Subfamily: Stenopodainae
- Genus: Narvesus; Stål, 1859

Genus of true bugs

Narvesus is a genus of assassin bugs in the family Reduviidae. There are at least two described species in Narvesus.

== Species ==
These two species belong to the genus Narvesus:

- Narvesus carolinensis Stål, 1859
- Narvesus minor Barber, 1930
