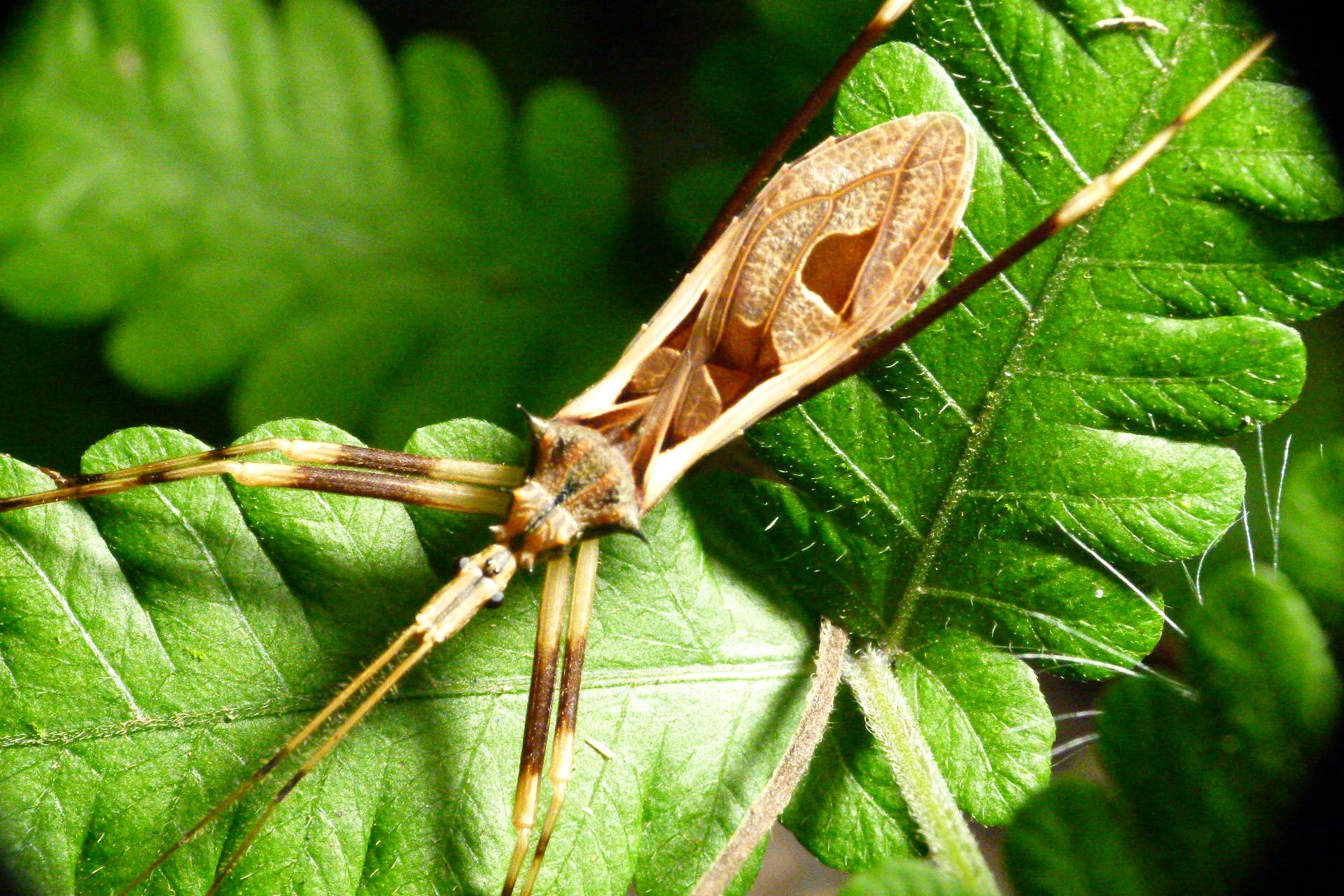
- Canthesancus sp. (India)

Scientific classification
- Domain: Eukaryota
- Kingdom: Animalia
- Phylum: Arthropoda
- Class: Insecta
- Order: Hemiptera
- Suborder: Heteroptera
- Family: Reduviidae
- Subfamily: Stenopodainae; Amyot and Serville, 1843

= Stenopodainae =

Subfamily of true bugs

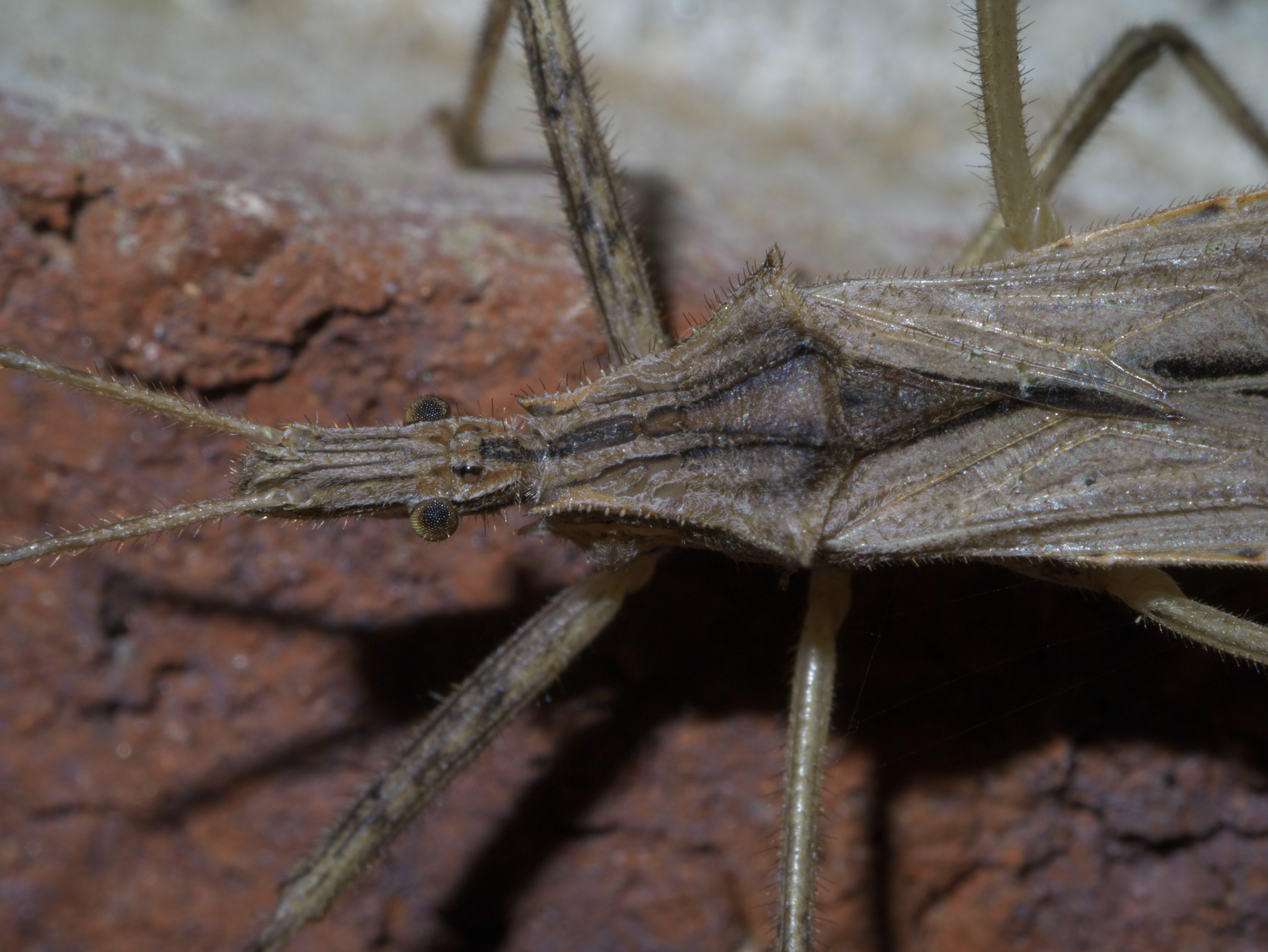
Stenopoda spinulosa

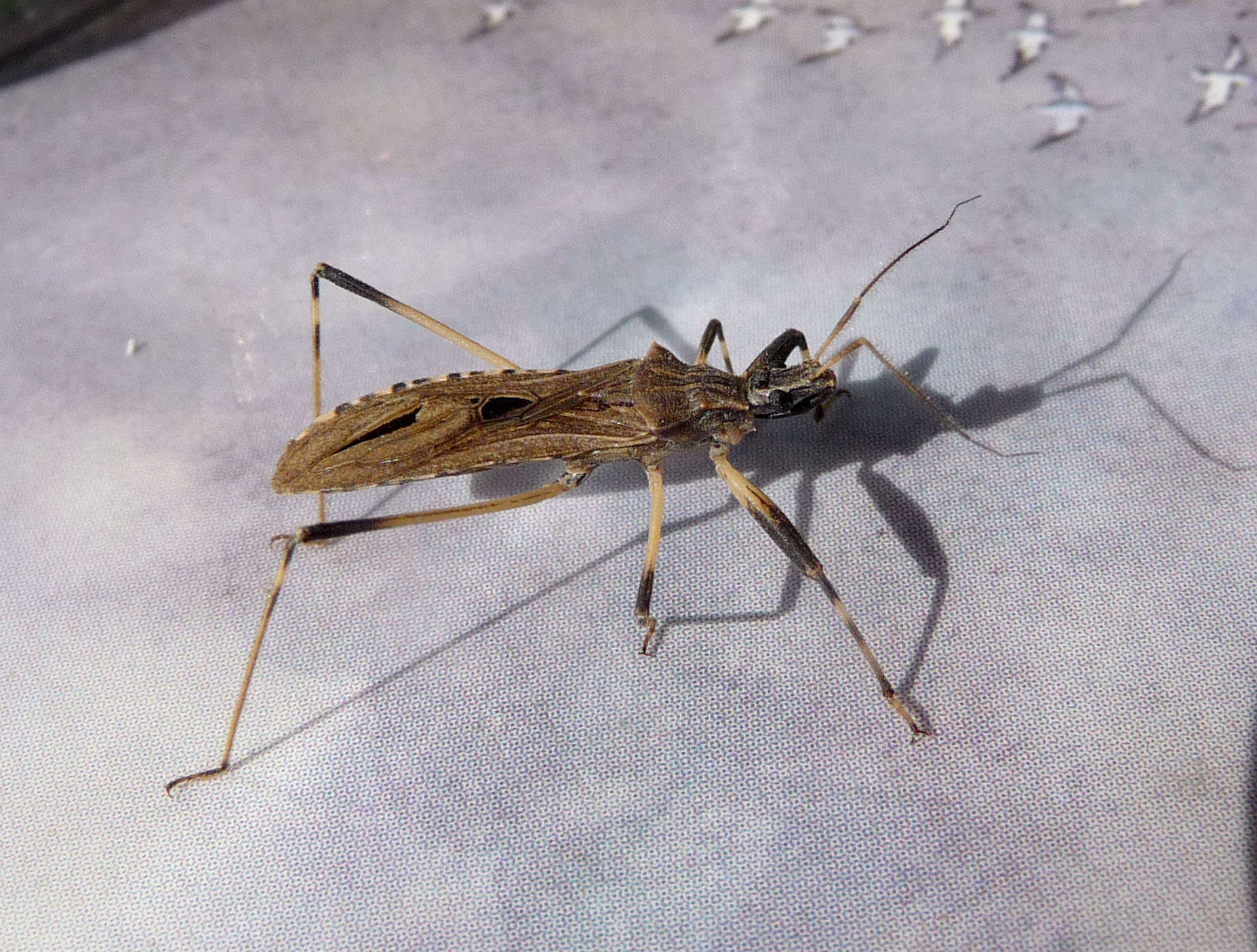
Oncocephalus

The Stenopodainae are a subfamily of Reduviidae (assassin bugs). Often cryptically coloured, with prominent mandibular plates, antennal segment 1 generally strongly developed, remaining segments slender and often folded back under the first; hemelytron typically with large pentagonal or hexagonal cell in the corium. Approximately 113 genera are described, with most species found in the tropics. Many species are associated with soil or sand, and many are apterous.

== Genera ==
These 22 genera belong to the subfamily Stenopodainae:

- Apronius Stål
- Aulacogenia Stål, 1870^{a}
- Bardesanes Distant, 1909^{a}
- Canthesancus Amyot and Serville, 1843^{a}
- Caunus Stål, 1865^{a}
- Ctenotrachelus Stål, 1868^{i c g b}
- Diaditus Stål, 1859^{i c g b}
- Duriocoris Miller, 1940
- Gnathobleda Stål, 1859^{i c g b}
- Hemisastrapada Livingstone and Ravichandran, 1988^{a}
- Kumaonocoris Miller 1952^{a}
- Narvesus Stål, 1859^{i c g b}
- Neoklugia Distant 1919^{a}
- Neothodelmus Distant 1919^{a}
- Oncocephalus Klug, 1830^{i c g b a}
- Pnirontis Stål, 1859^{i c g b}
- Pygolampis Germar, 1825^{i c g b a}
- Sastrapada Amyot and Serville, 1843^{a}
- Staccia Stål, 1865^{a}
- Stenopoda Laporte, 1832^{i c g b}
- Streptophorocoris Miller 1957^{a}
- Thodelmus Stål, 1859^{a}

Data sources: i = ITIS, c = Catalogue of Life, g = GBIF, b = Bugguide.net a = Ambrose 2006
