= Aulacogenia =

Scientific classification
- Kingdom: Animalia
- Phylum: Arthropoda
- Clade: Pancrustacea
- Class: Insecta
- Order: Hemiptera
- Suborder: Heteroptera
- Family: Reduviidae
- Subfamily: Stenopodainae
- Genus: Aulacogenia; Stål

Genus of true bugs

Aulacogenia is a genus within the subfamily Stenopodainae of Reduviidae. 19 species have been described, including 5 from China.

== Partial list of species ==
- Aulacogenia corniculata Stål
- Aulacogenia darjeelingensis - 2015, found in India
- Aulacogenia zhangi Wang, 2008
