= Pygolampis sericea =

Scientific classification
- Kingdom: Animalia
- Phylum: Arthropoda
- Clade: Pancrustacea
- Class: Insecta
- Order: Hemiptera
- Suborder: Heteroptera
- Family: Reduviidae
- Genus: Pygolampis
- Species: P. sericea

Binomial name
- Pygolampis sericea Stål, 1859

Species of true bug

Pygolampis sericea is a species of assassin bug in the family Reduviidae. It is found in North America.
