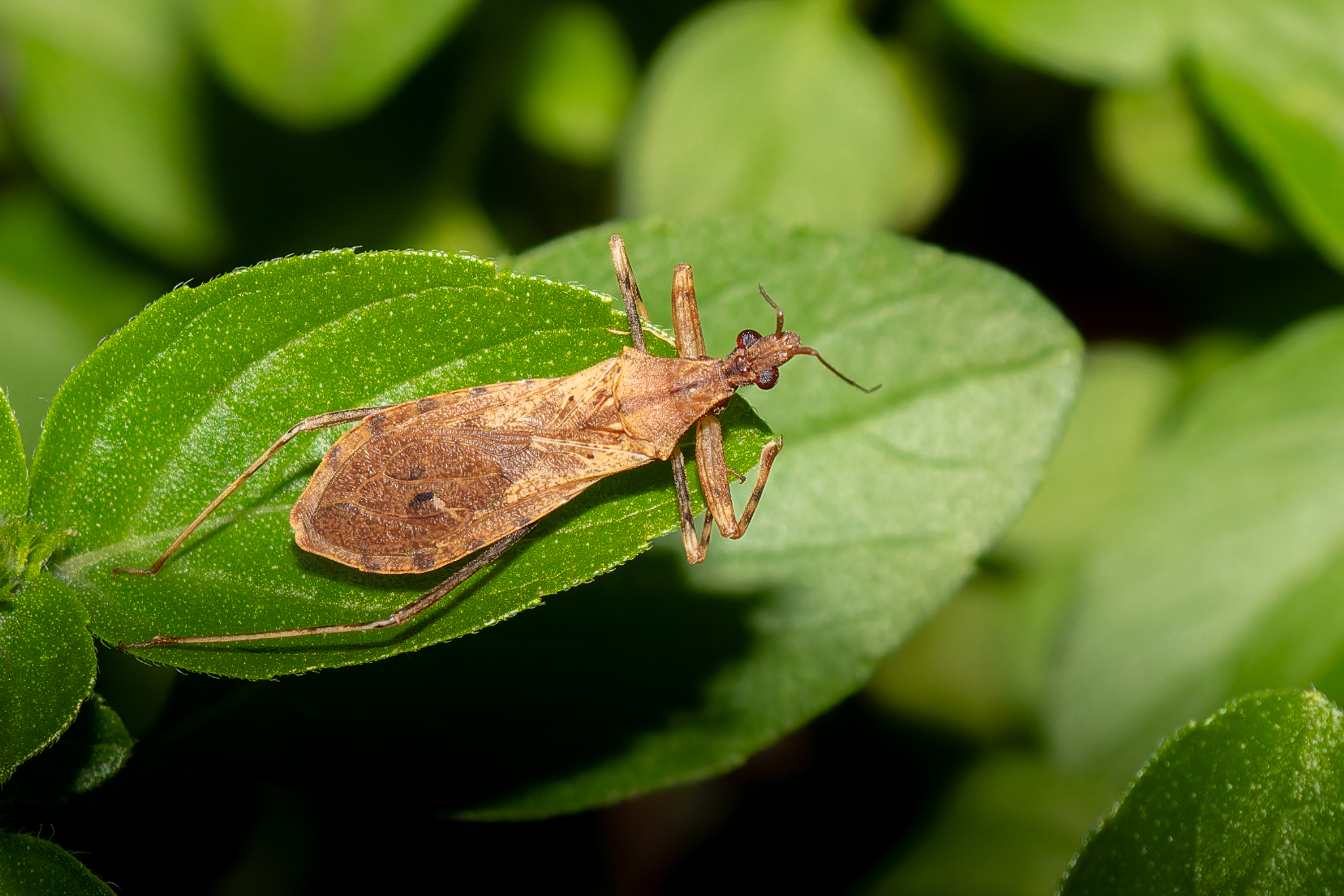

Scientific classification
- Kingdom: Animalia
- Phylum: Arthropoda
- Clade: Pancrustacea
- Class: Insecta
- Order: Hemiptera
- Suborder: Heteroptera
- Family: Reduviidae
- Subfamily: Stenopodainae
- Genus: Apronius; Stål

= Apronius =

Genus of true bugs

Apronius is a genus within the subfamily Stenopodainae of Reduviidae. Five species are known, most from South America.

== Selected species ==
- Apronius froeschneri
- Apronius granulosus
