= Gnathobleda litigiosa =

Scientific classification
- Kingdom: Animalia
- Phylum: Arthropoda
- Clade: Pancrustacea
- Class: Insecta
- Order: Hemiptera
- Suborder: Heteroptera
- Family: Reduviidae
- Genus: Gnathobleda
- Species: G. litigiosa

Binomial name
- Gnathobleda litigiosa Stål, 1859

Species of true bug

Gnathobleda litigiosa is a species of assassin bug in the family Reduviidae. It is found in the Caribbean Sea, Central America, and North America.
