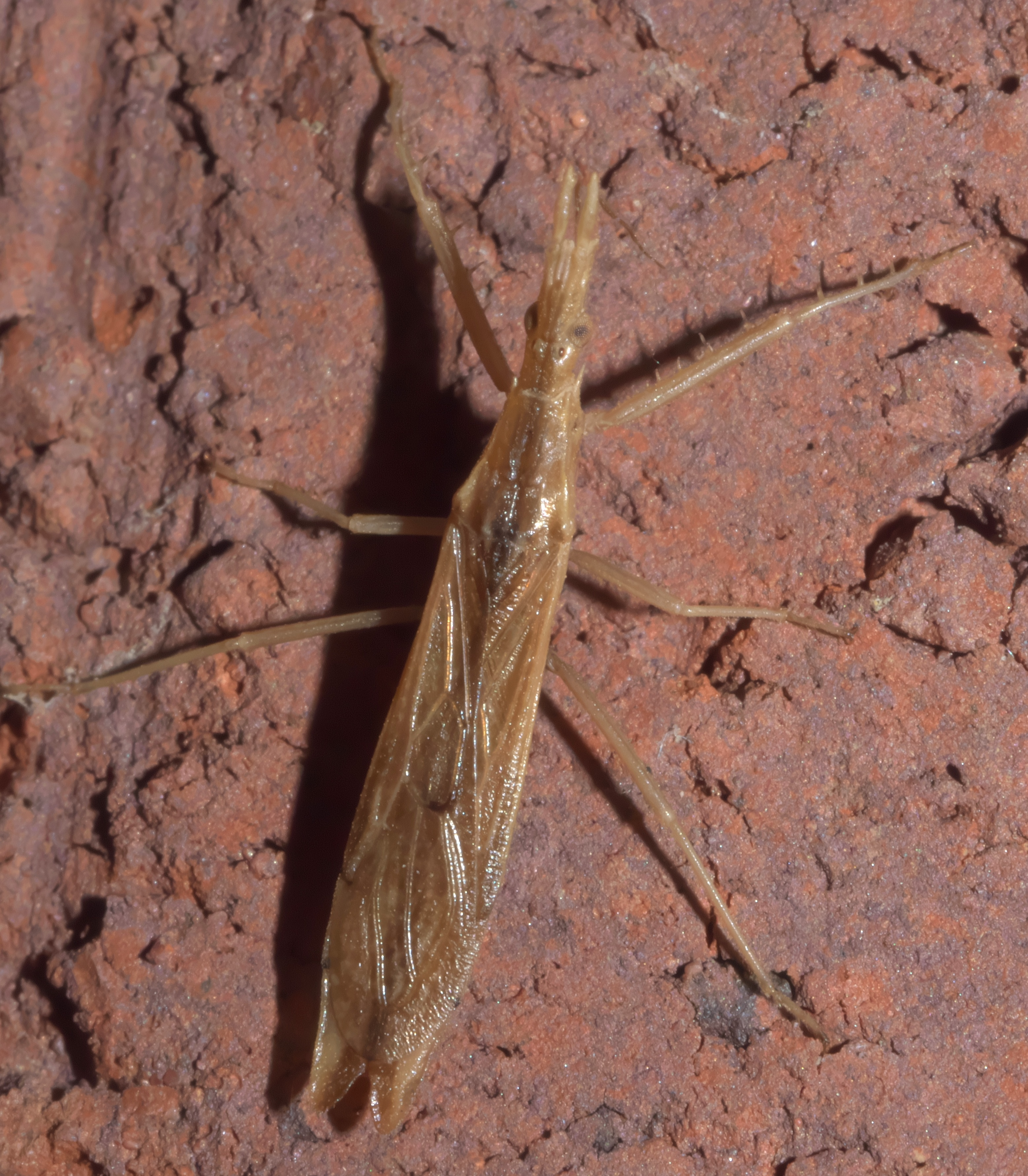

Scientific classification
- Kingdom: Animalia
- Phylum: Arthropoda
- Class: Insecta
- Order: Hemiptera
- Suborder: Heteroptera
- Family: Reduviidae
- Genus: Pnirontis
- Species: P. modesta

Binomial name
- Pnirontis modesta Banks, 1910

= Pnirontis modesta =

Species of true bug

Pnirontis modesta is a species of assassin bug in the family Reduviidae. It is found in the Caribbean and North America.

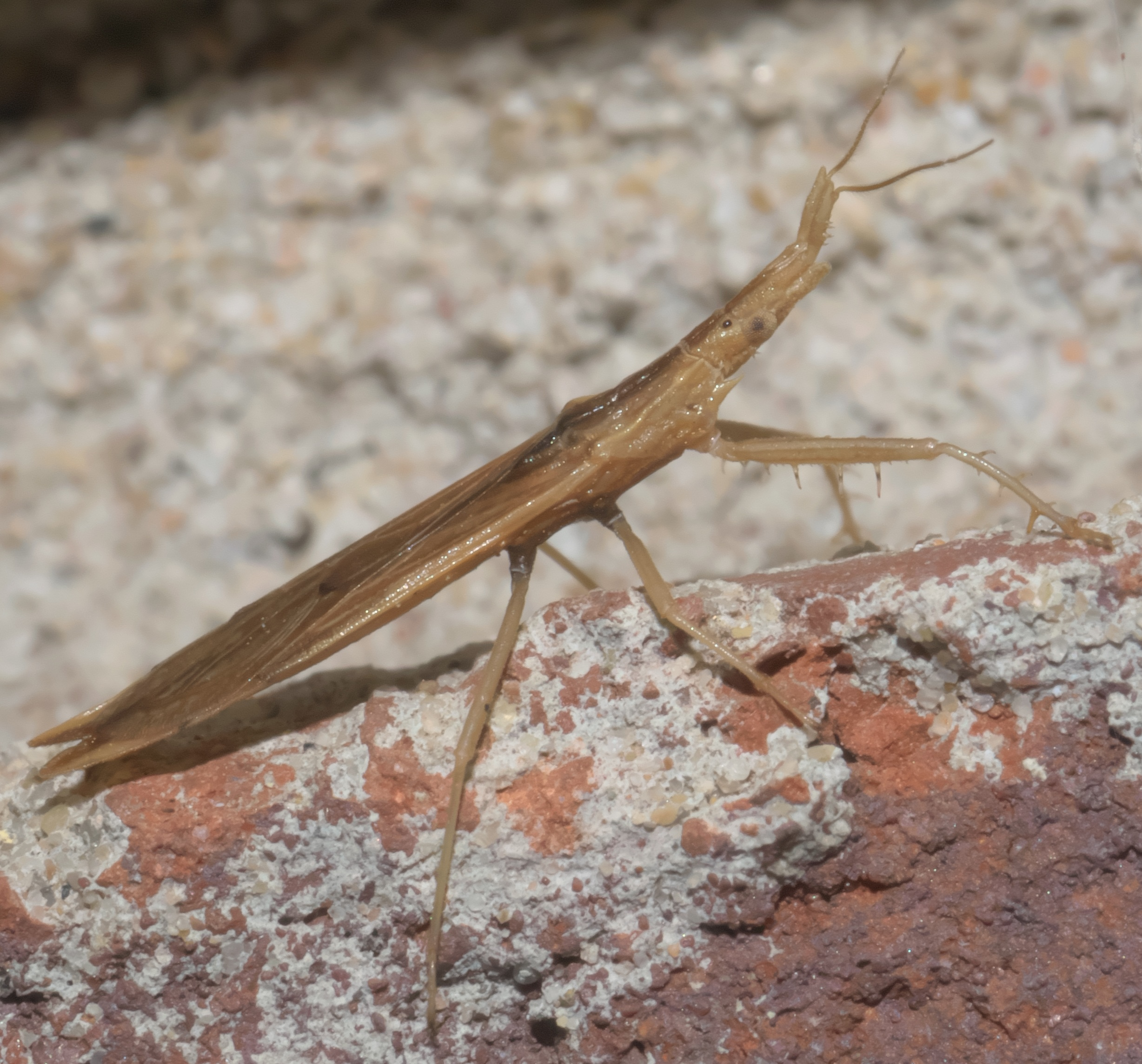
