= Gnathobleda =

Scientific classification
- Kingdom: Animalia
- Phylum: Arthropoda
- Clade: Pancrustacea
- Class: Insecta
- Order: Hemiptera
- Suborder: Heteroptera
- Family: Reduviidae
- Subfamily: Stenopodainae
- Genus: Gnathobleda; Stål, 1859

Genus of true bugs

Gnathobleda is a genus of assassin bugs in the family Reduviidae. There are at least four described species in Gnathobleda.

== Species ==
These four species belong to the genus Gnathobleda:

- Gnathobleda fraudulenta Stål, 1859
- Gnathobleda litigiosa Stål, 1859
- Gnathobleda toba Giacchi, 1970
- Gnathobleda violenta Stal
