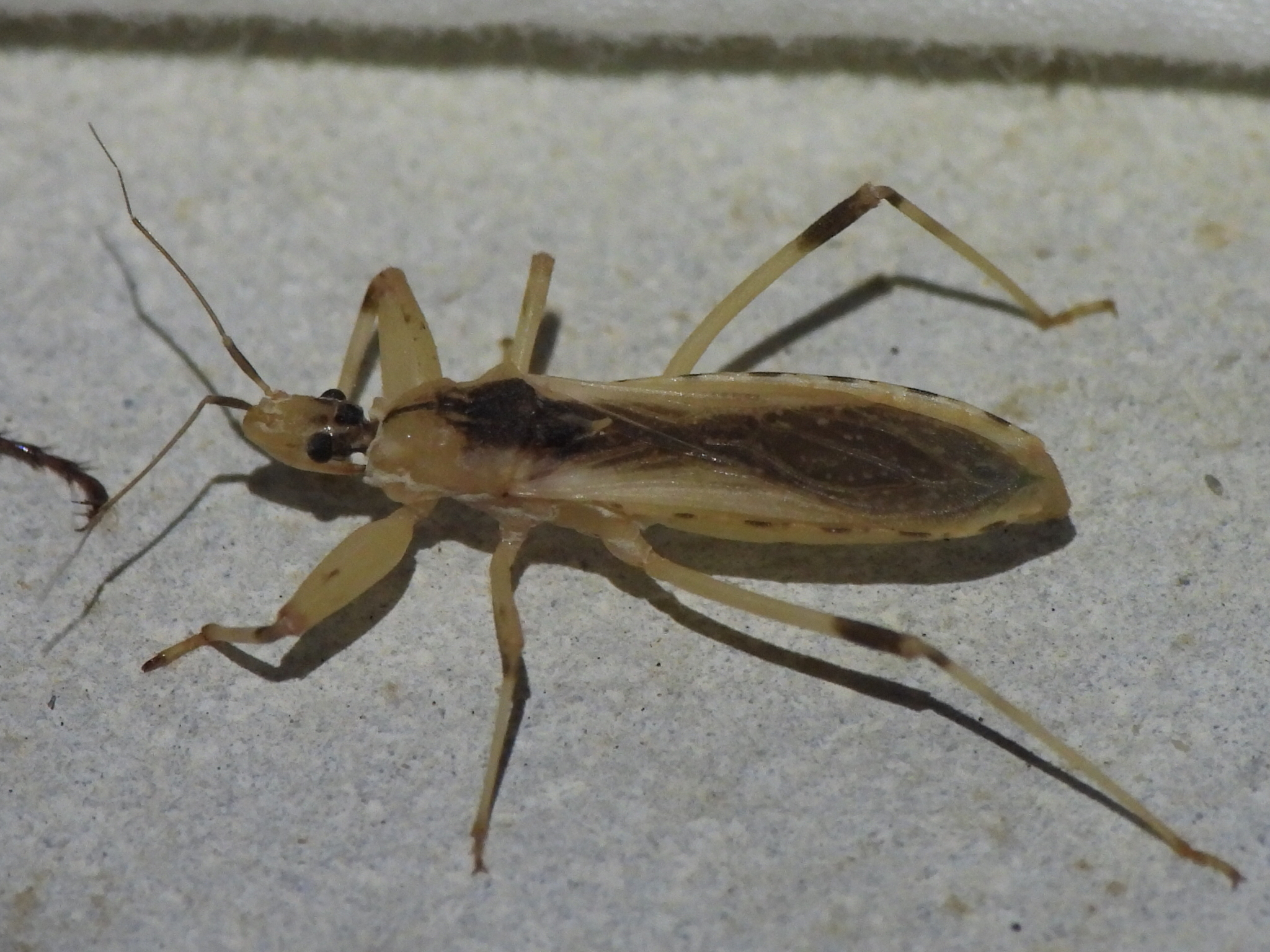
- Oncocephalus nubilus, Texas

Scientific classification
- Domain: Eukaryota
- Kingdom: Animalia
- Phylum: Arthropoda
- Class: Insecta
- Order: Hemiptera
- Suborder: Heteroptera
- Family: Reduviidae
- Genus: Oncocephalus
- Species: O. nubilus

Binomial name
- Oncocephalus nubilus Van Duzee, 1914

= Oncocephalus nubilus =

Species of true bug

Oncocephalus nubilus is a species of assassin bug in the family Reduviidae. It is found in Central America and North America.
