= Diaditus tejanus =

Scientific classification
- Domain: Eukaryota
- Kingdom: Animalia
- Phylum: Arthropoda
- Class: Insecta
- Order: Hemiptera
- Suborder: Heteroptera
- Family: Reduviidae
- Genus: Diaditus
- Species: D. tejanus

Binomial name
- Diaditus tejanus Giacchi, 1980

Species of true bug

Diaditus tejanus is a species of assassin bug in the family Reduviidae. It is found in Central America and North America.
