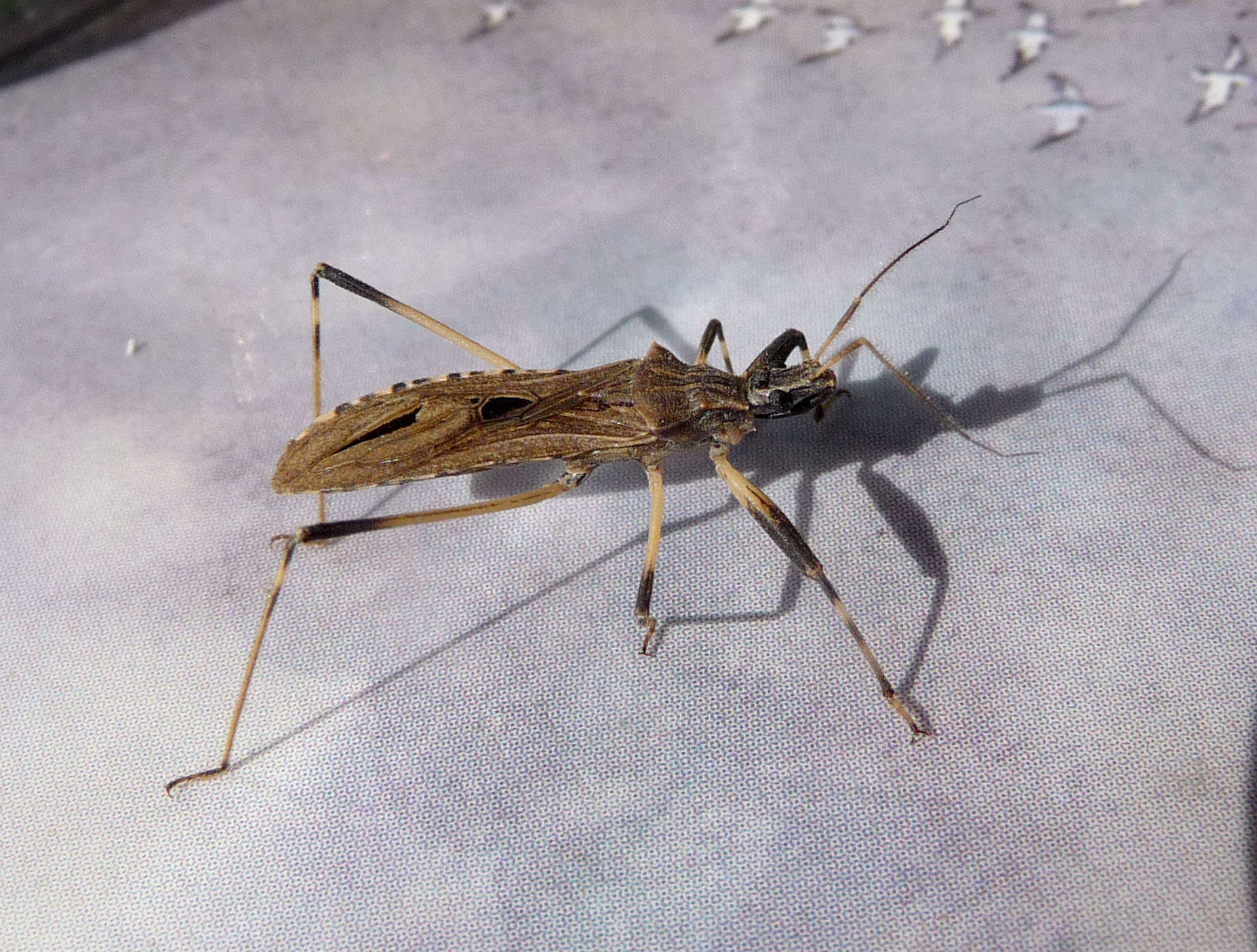

Scientific classification
- Kingdom: Animalia
- Phylum: Arthropoda
- Clade: Pancrustacea
- Class: Insecta
- Order: Hemiptera
- Suborder: Heteroptera
- Family: Reduviidae
- Subfamily: Stenopodainae
- Genus: Oncocephalus; Klug, 1830

Diversity
- at least 210 species

= Oncocephalus =

Genus of insects

Oncocephalus is a genus of assassin bugs in the family Reduviidae. There are at least 210 described species in Oncocephalus.

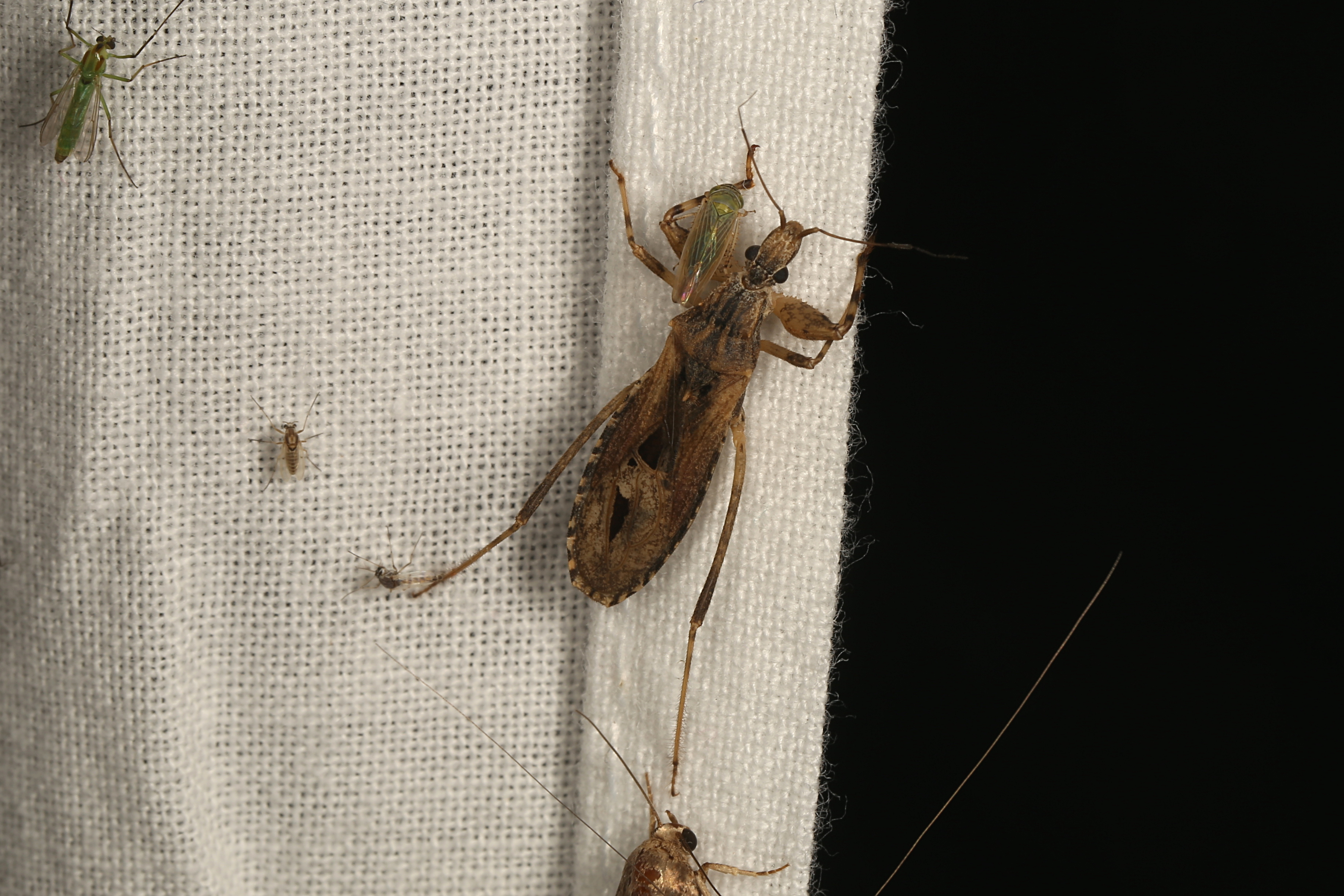

== See also ==
- List of Oncocephalus species
