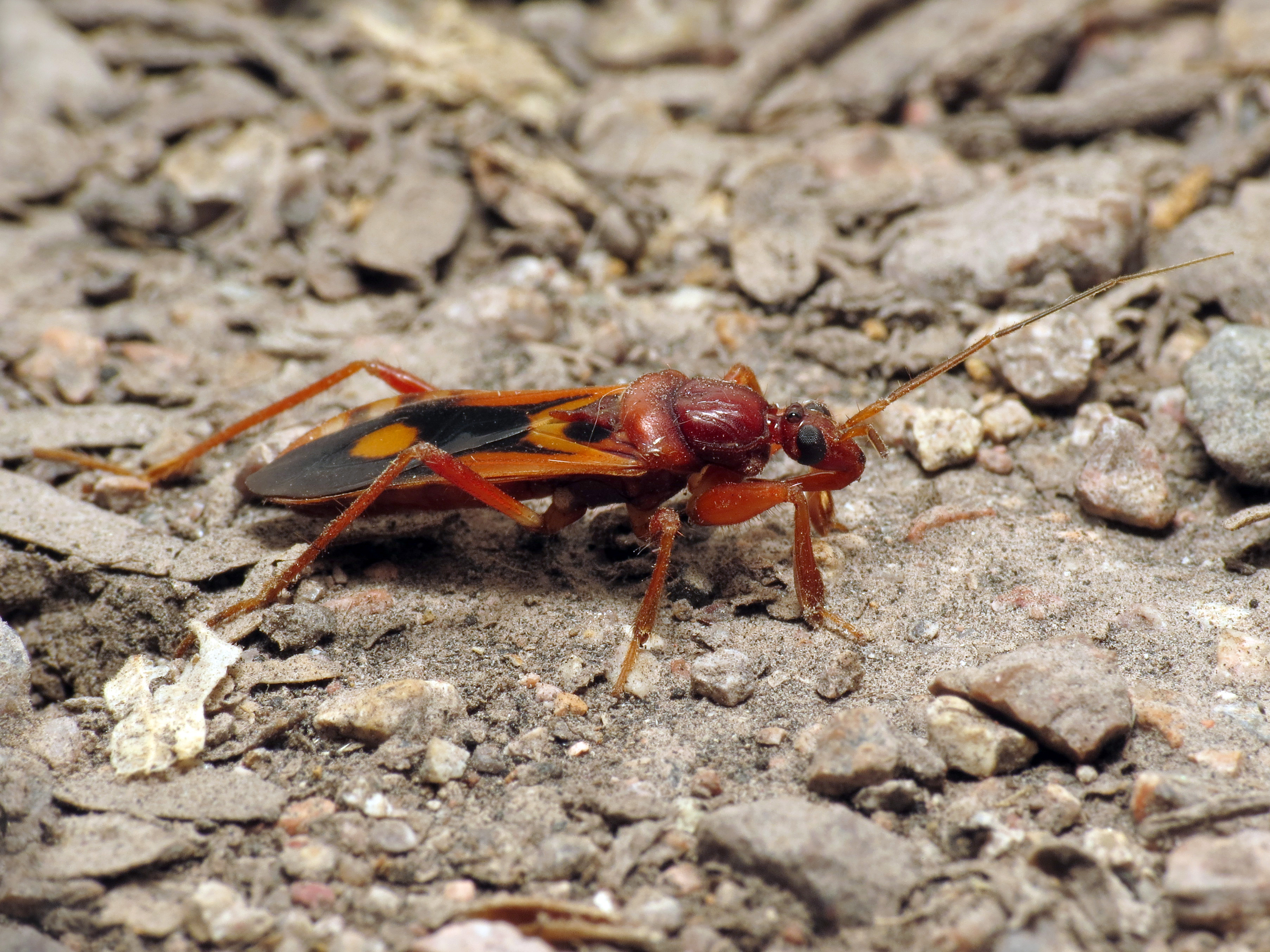

Scientific classification
- Kingdom: Animalia
- Phylum: Arthropoda
- Clade: Pancrustacea
- Class: Insecta
- Order: Hemiptera
- Suborder: Heteroptera
- Family: Reduviidae
- Genus: Rasahus
- Species: R. thoracicus

Binomial name
- Rasahus thoracicus Stål, 1872

= Western corsair =

Species of true bug

The western corsair (Rasahus thoracicus) is a species of assassin bug and is one of the two species of "two spotted corsairs", the other being Rasahus biguttatus. The adults have an orange and black body and an orange spot on each wing. They feed primarily on other insects and after dark are attracted to bright lights (where prey are ample). The bite of the western corsair can be extremely painful.

== Description and range ==
The adults have a body length of 18–23 mm. The black and amber thorax and long legs are smooth and shiny, and the front pair of legs is noticeably larger than the others. The fully functional wings each have a single large tan, orange, or red spot at its center. When at rest, the wings are folded on top of each other along the insect's back, making the wing spots appear as one larger spot. The side of the abdomen has a black and yellow checkered pattern. Their range includes the American Pacific Northwest and most of the warmer areas of the state of California, including the Sierra foothills, coastal valleys, Central Valley, and the state's desert areas. They are voracious nocturnal ground insect-hunters, but only bite humans if handled roughly. The bites, however, can be severe enough to induce headaches that last for a week or more. They are most frequently encountered on evenings between July and October.

== Diet ==
Western corsairs feed on other smaller insects, and have adaptations to suck fluid from prey. Their diet includes caterpillars, larvae of leaf beetles and sawflies. They also feed on other true bugs, including other assassin bugs. Other prey items include bees, lacewings, and lady beetles.

== Bite ==
The bite of a western corsair is painful, but the individual bitten is not at risk of Chagas disease, which is instead spread by related triatomine bugs.

== Life stages ==
Western corsairs go through three life stages. They typically have one to two generations yearly.

=== Nymphal stages ===
These assassin bugs go through five different nymphal stages. These five stages conclude in about just a year. In the last stage, they grow into adults with wings, without having to go through any intermediate pupal stages. Their adulthood typically arrives in the warmer summer months.
