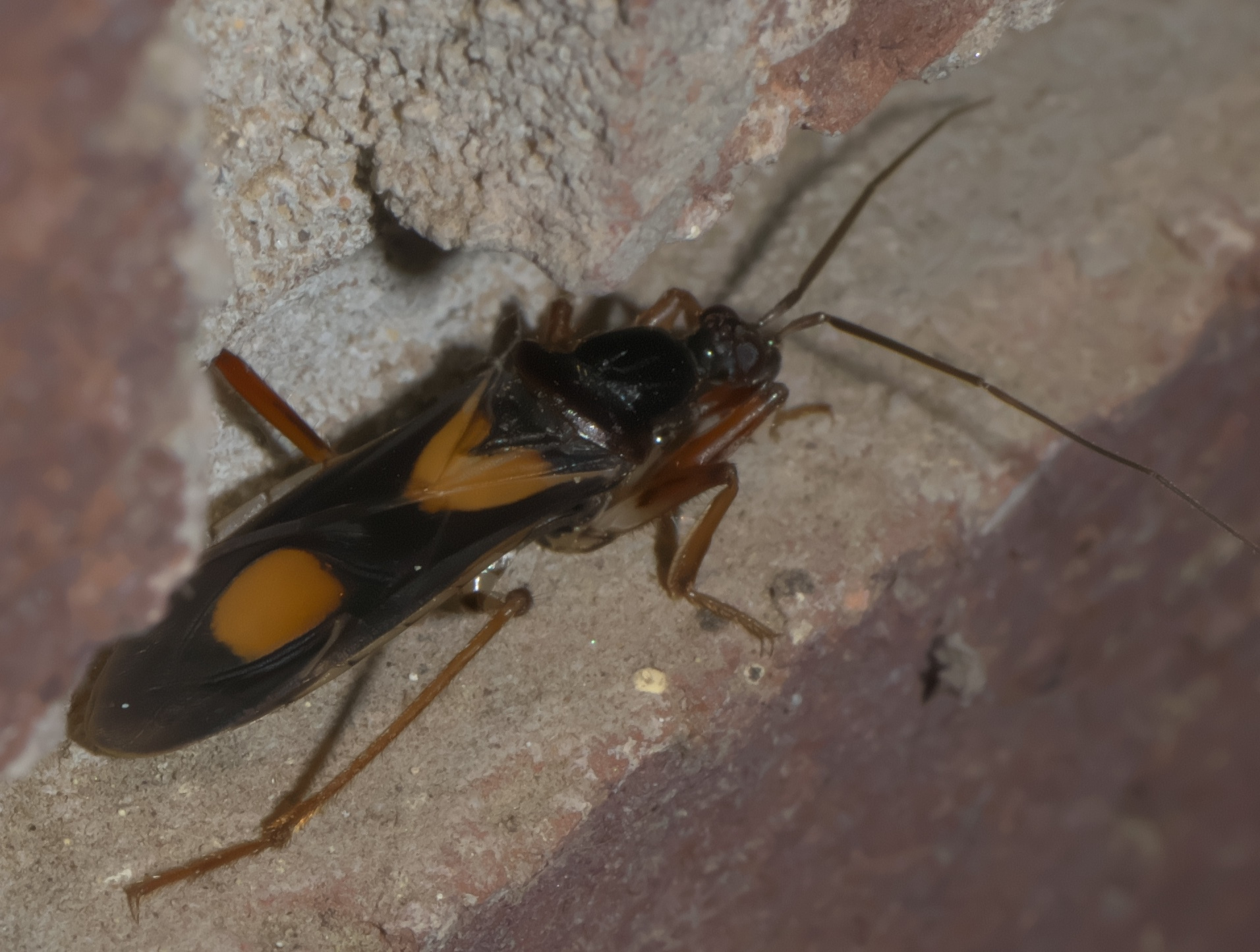

Scientific classification
- Kingdom: Animalia
- Phylum: Arthropoda
- Class: Insecta
- Order: Hemiptera
- Suborder: Heteroptera
- Family: Reduviidae
- Genus: Rasahus
- Species: R. hamatus

Binomial name
- Rasahus hamatus (Fabricius, 1781)

= Rasahus hamatus =

Species of true bug

Rasahus hamatus, the corsair, is a species of corsair (or assassin bug) in the family Reduviidae. It is found in the Caribbean, Central America, North America, and South America.
