= Peirates =

- Peirates hybridus

Scientific classification
- Kingdom: Animalia
- Phylum: Arthropoda
- Clade: Pancrustacea
- Class: Insecta
- Order: Hemiptera
- Suborder: Heteroptera
- Family: Reduviidae
- Subfamily: Peiratinae
- Genus: Peirates; Audinet-Serville, 1831

Synonyms
- Cleptocoris Stål, 1866; Pirates Burmeister, 1835; Spilodermus Stål, 1868

Genus of true bugs

Peirates is the type genus of assassin bugs in the subfamily Peiratinae; it was erected by Jean Guillaume Audinet-Serville in 1831. Species have been recorded from most of the Palaearctic realm, southern Africa, South, NE and SE Asia through to Australia.

== Species ==
As of November 2026, Biolib includes:

P. atromaculatus from Borneo

subgenus Cleptocoris Stål, 1866

1. Peirates atromaculatus (Stål, 1870)
2. Peirates aurigans (Distant, 1902)
3. Peirates balteatus (Germar, 1837)
4. Peirates cinctiventris Horváth, 1879
5. Peirates macilentus (Miller, 1950)
6. Peirates maurus (Stål, 1855)
7. Peirates perinetensis (Villiers, 1960)
8. Peirates strepitans Rambur, 1839

subgenus Peirates Audinet-Serville, 1831

1. Peirates hybridus (Scopoli, 1763)
2. Peirates stridulus (Fabricius, 1787)

Unplaced and fossil species

1. Peirates alutaceus (Reuter, 1881)
2. Peirates arcuatus (Stål, 1871)
3. Peirates argenteopilosus Schouteden, 1931
4. Peirates barbarus Miller, 1940
5. Peirates basuto Miller, 1956
6. Peirates bicolor Distant, 1903
7. Peirates bicoloripes Breddin, 1901
8. Peirates buruanus Miller, 1954
9. Peirates castaneipennis Reuter, 1887
10. Peirates collarti Schouteden, 1931
11. Peirates concinnus Walker, 1873
12. Peirates confusus Schouteden, 1931
13. Peirates consobrinus Miller, 1948
14. Peirates crassifemur (Reuter, 1881)
15. Peirates crudelis Coscarón, 1997
16. Peirates cyaneonitens Breddin, 1900
17. Peirates dimidiatus Walker, 1873
18. Peirates diola (Villiers, 1963)
19. Peirates ephippiger (White, 1843)
20. Peirates erebus Distant, 1903
21. Peirates excelsus Miller, 1948
22. Peirates flavipes (Walker, 1873)
23. Peirates formicarius (Walker, 1873)
24. Peirates frater Reuter, 1881
25. Peirates fuliginosus (Erichson, 1842)
26. Peirates fulvescens Lindberg, 1938
27. Peirates helluo (Stål, 1866)
28. Peirates immaculatus Miller, 1954
29. Peirates lepturoides (Wolff, 1804)
30. Peirates limbatus (Reuter, 1881)
31. Peirates lurco (Stål, 1866)
32. Peirates marginiventris Distant, 1902
33. Peirates mimulus Miller, 1948
34. Peirates monodi Villiers, 1948
35. Peirates mundulus Stål, 1874
36. Peirates musculus Miller, 1948
37. Peirates nanus Miller, 1954
38. Peirates nigerrimus Coscarón, 1997
39. Peirates nitidicollis Reuter, 1881
40. Peirates ochripennis Jeannel, 1916
41. Peirates pallens Miller, 1940
42. Peirates parvulus (Signoret, 1881)
43. Peirates patricius Miller, 1948
44. Peirates picturatus Miller, 1948
45. Peirates punctorius (Stål, 1866)
46. Peirates punctum (Fabricius, 1794)
47. Peirates quadrinotatus (Fabricius, 1798)
48. Peirates semifasciatus (Walker, 1873)
49. Peirates sepulchralis Distant, 1902
50. Peirates setosus (Stål, 1874)
51. Peirates sin Linnavuori, 1984
52. Peirates sinicus Walker, 1873
53. Peirates sordidus Miller, 1948
54. Peirates sparsus Miller, 1948
55. Peirates stallii Wallengren, 1875
56. Peirates tellini Schouteden, 1906
57. Peirates turpis Walker, 1873
58. Peirates unipunctatus Livingstone & Murugan, 1989
59. Peirates vittatus Reuter, 1881
60. †Peirates oeningensis Heer, 1853
