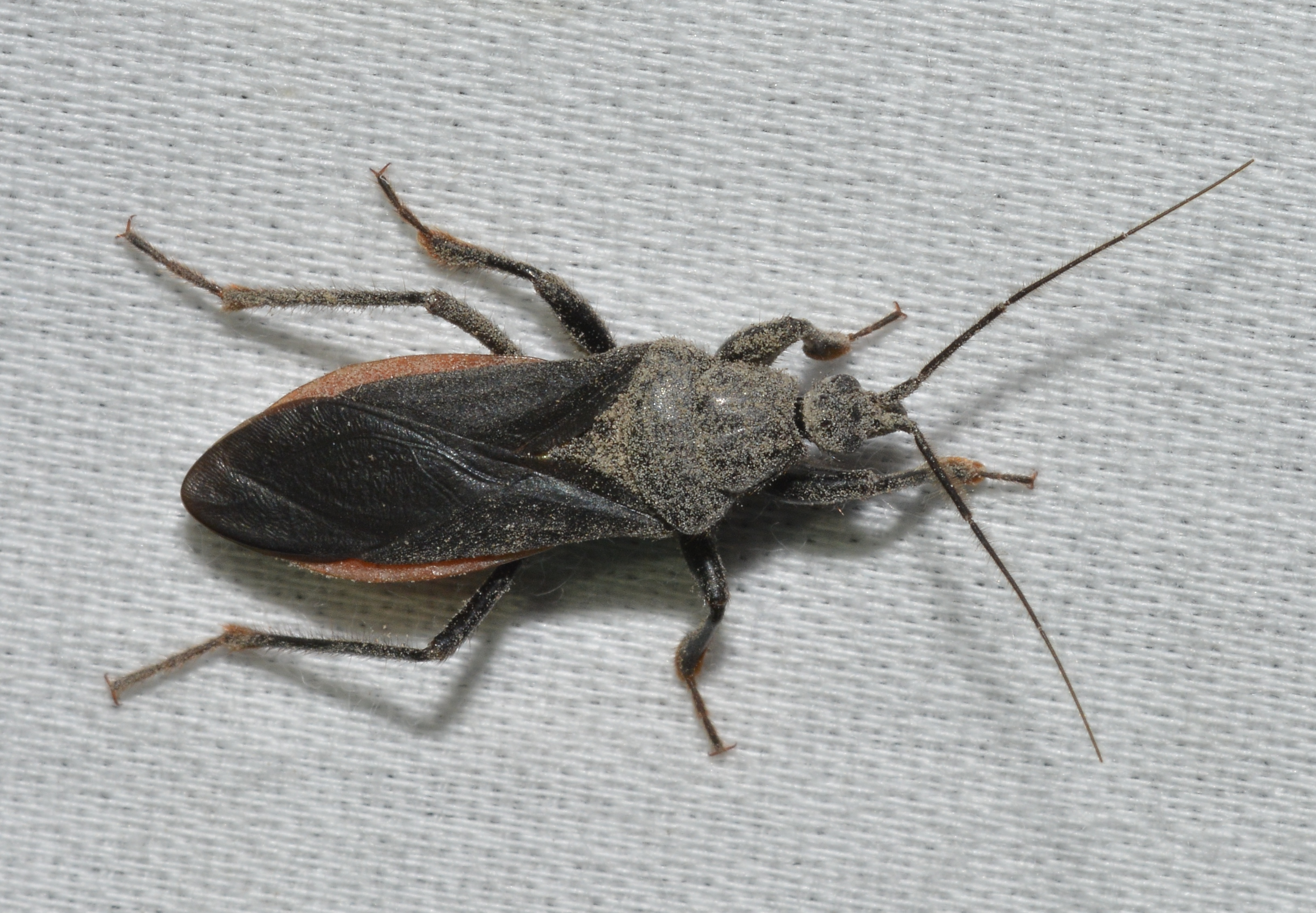
- Melanolestes picipes

Scientific classification
- Kingdom: Animalia
- Phylum: Arthropoda
- Clade: Pancrustacea
- Class: Insecta
- Order: Hemiptera
- Suborder: Heteroptera
- Family: Reduviidae
- Subfamily: Peiratinae
- Genus: Melanolestes; Stål, 1866

= Melanolestes =

Genus of true bugs

Melanolestes (meaning "black robber") is a Nearctic and Neotropical genus of assassin bugs (Reduviidae). Nine species are known :

== Species ==
- Melanolestes argentinus Berg, 1879
- Melanolestes degener (Walker, 1873)
- Melanolestes goiasensis Coscarón & Carpintero, 1993
- Melanolestes lugens Coscarón & Carpintero, 1993
- Melanolestes minutus Coscarón & Carpintero, 1993
- Melanolestes morio (Erichson, 1848)
- Melanolestes picicornis (Stål, 1860)
- Melanolestes picinus Stål, 1872
- Melanolestes picipes (Herrich-Schaeffer, 1846)
