= Androclus =

- Androclus pictus

Scientific classification
- Kingdom: Animalia
- Phylum: Arthropoda
- Clade: Pancrustacea
- Class: Insecta
- Order: Hemiptera
- Suborder: Heteroptera
- Family: Reduviidae
- Subfamily: Peiratinae
- Genus: Androclus; Stål, 1863

Genus of true bugs

Androclus is a genus of African and Asian assassin bugs in the subfamily Peiratinae, erected by Carl Stål in 1863.

== Species ==
As of November 2026, Biolib includes:

1. Androclus borneensis Distant, 1903
2. Androclus dilectus Miller, 1956
3. Androclus ferus Miller, 1956
4. Androclus granulatus Stål, 1863
5. Androclus guineensis Villiers, 1963
6. Androclus javanus Breddin, 1903
7. Androclus meridionalis Miller, 1956
8. Androclus occidentalis Miller, 1956
9. Androclus pictus (Herrich-Schaeffer, 1848)
10. Androclus sahelensis Villiers, 1919
11. Androclus seyidiensis Jeannel, 1916
12. Androclus stolidus Miller, 1940
13. Androclus villosulus Miller, 1948
