= Tydides =

Scientific classification
- Kingdom: Animalia
- Phylum: Arthropoda
- Clade: Pancrustacea
- Class: Insecta
- Order: Hemiptera
- Suborder: Heteroptera
- Family: Reduviidae
- Subfamily: Peiratinae
- Genus: Tydides; Stål, 1865

Genus of insects

Tydides is a genus of central and South American assassin bugs in the subfamily Peiratinae, erected by Carl Stål in 1865.
