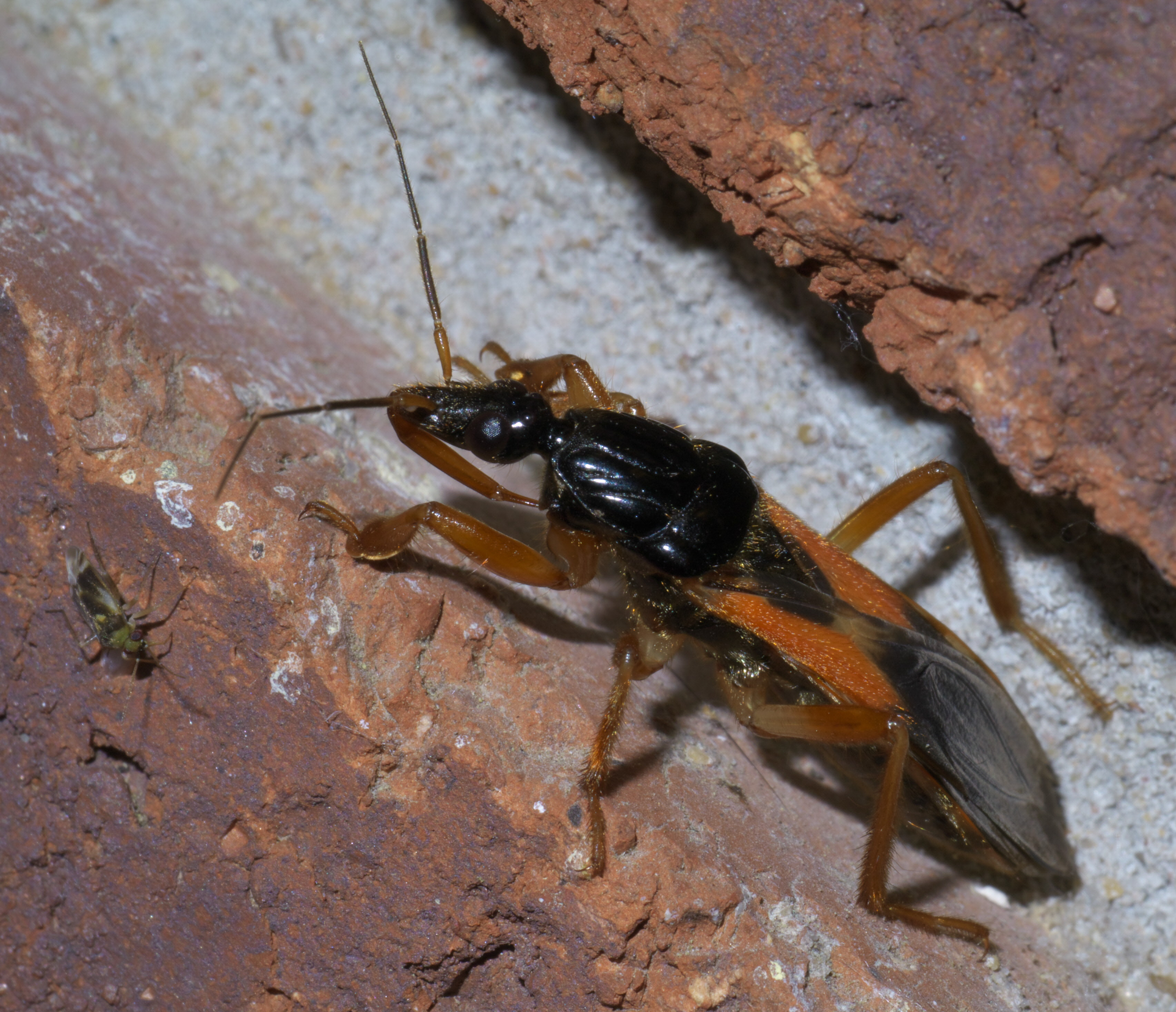

Scientific classification
- Kingdom: Animalia
- Phylum: Arthropoda
- Class: Insecta
- Order: Hemiptera
- Suborder: Heteroptera
- Family: Reduviidae
- Genus: Sirthenea
- Species: S. carinata

Binomial name
- Sirthenea carinata (Fabricius, 1798)

Synonyms
- Reduvius carinatus Fabricius, 1798

= Sirthenea carinata =

Species of true bug

Sirthenea carinata is a species of corsair in the family Reduviidae. It is found in Central America, North America, and South America.

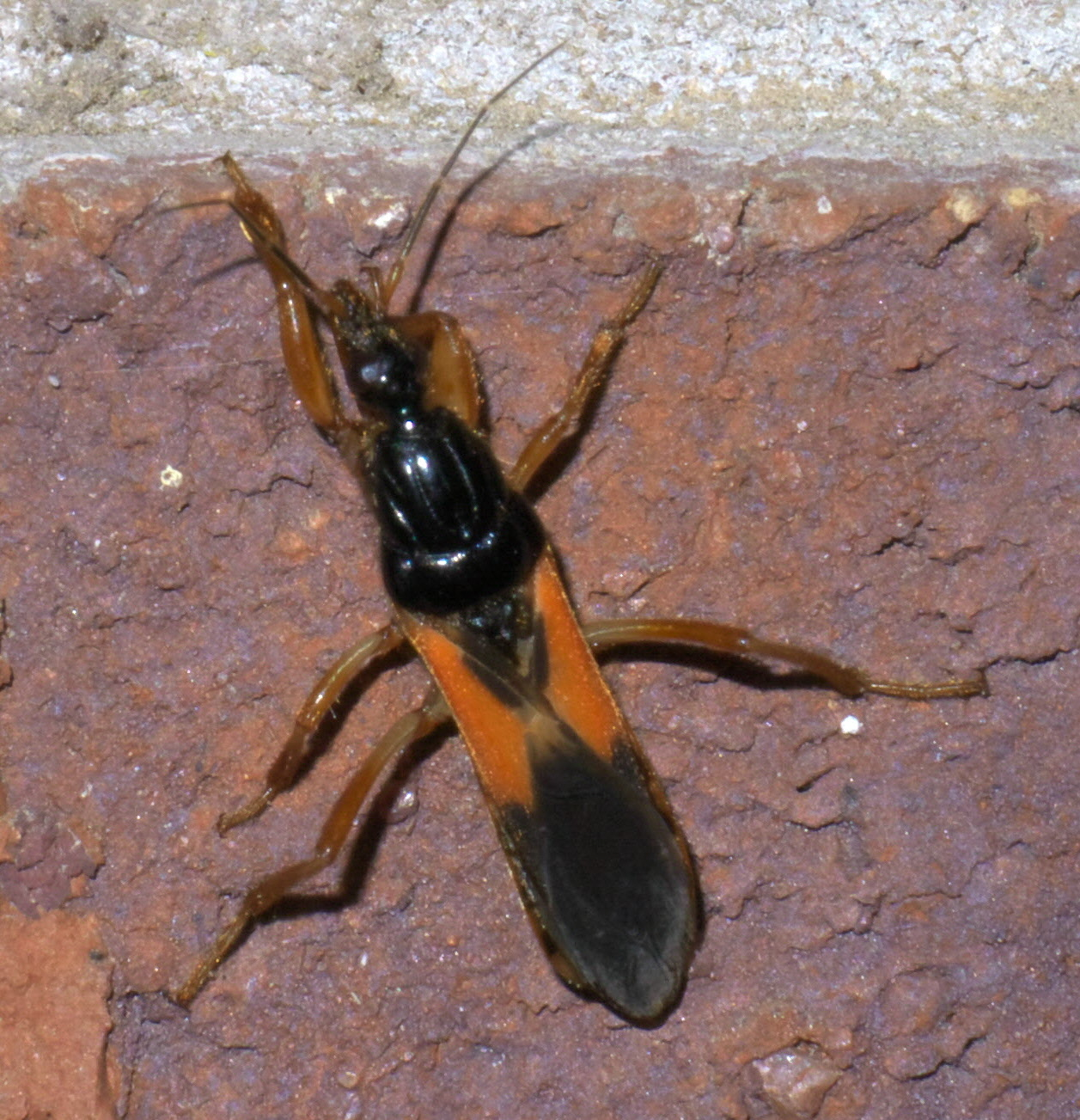
