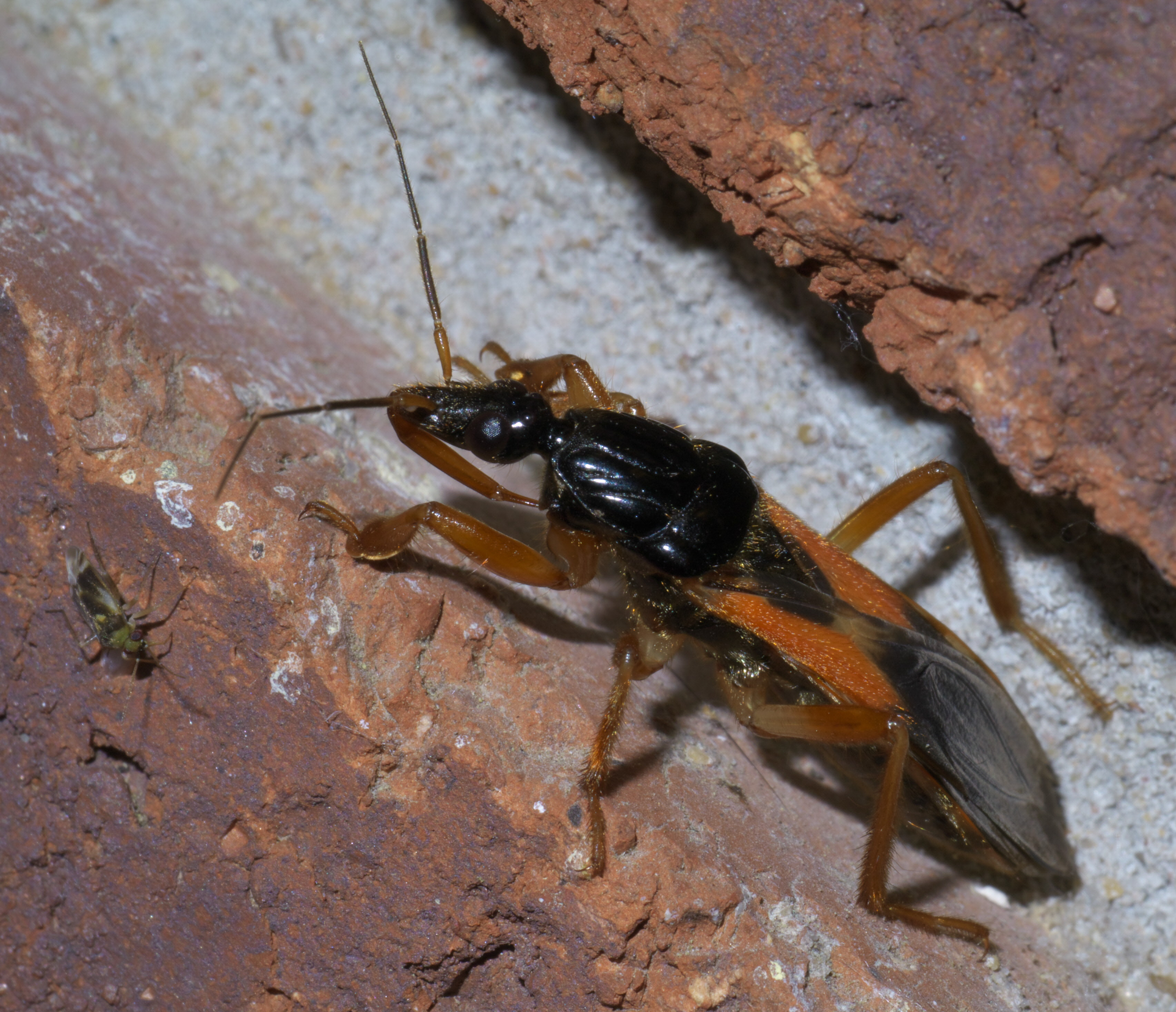
- Sirthenea carinata

Scientific classification
- Kingdom: Animalia
- Phylum: Arthropoda
- Clade: Pancrustacea
- Class: Insecta
- Order: Hemiptera
- Suborder: Heteroptera
- Family: Reduviidae
- Subfamily: Peiratinae
- Genus: Sirthenea; Spinola, 1837

= Sirthenea =

Genus of true bugs

Sirthenea is a genus of corsairs in the family Reduviidae. There are at least 40 described species in Sirthenea.

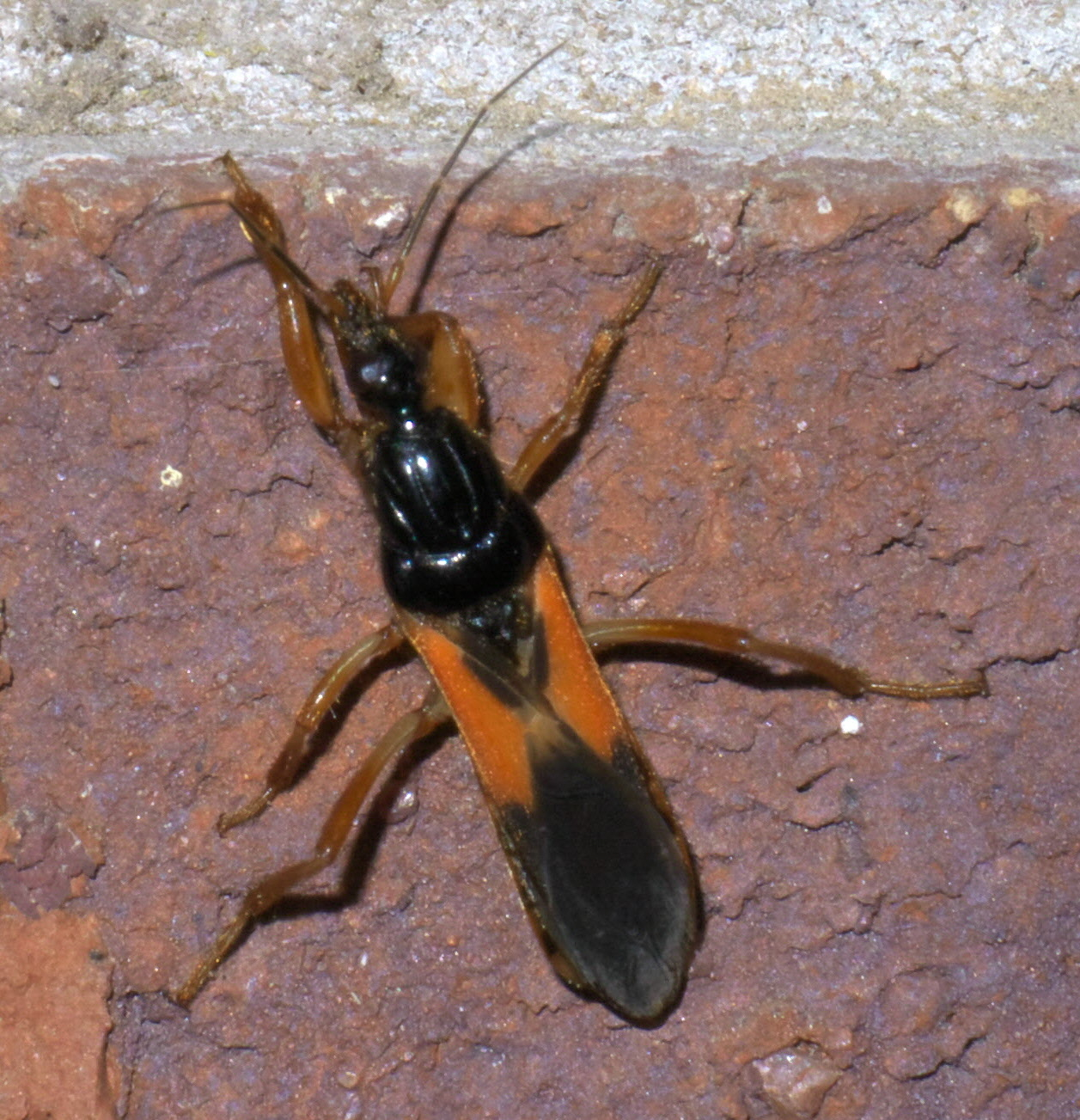
Sirthenea carinata

== Species ==
These 40 species belong to the genus Sirthenea:

- Sirthenea africana Distant, 1903
- Sirthenea amazona Stål, 1866
- Sirthenea anduzei Drake & Harris
- Sirthenea angolana Villiers, 1958
- Sirthenea atra Willemse, 1985
- Sirthenea atrocyanea Horváth, 1909
- Sirthenea bequaerti Schouteden, 1913
- Sirthenea bharati Sucheta & Chopra, 1988-01
- Sirthenea carinata (Fabricius, 1798)
- Sirthenea clavata Miller, 1948
- Sirthenea collarti Schouteden, 1931
- Sirthenea dimidiata Horváth, 1911
- Sirthenea dubia Willemse, 1985
- Sirthenea erythromelas (Walker, 1873)
- Sirthenea ferdinandi Willemse, 1985
- Sirthenea flaviceps (Signoret, 1860)
- Sirthenea fulvipennis (Walker, 1873)
- Sirthenea glabra (Walker, 1873)
- Sirthenea jamaicensis Willemse, 1985
- Sirthenea koreana Lee & Kerzhner, 1996-01
- Sirthenea laevicollis Horváth, 1909
- Sirthenea leonina Horváth, 1909
- Sirthenea leontovitchi Schouteden, 1931
- Sirthenea melanota Cai & Lu, 1990-01
- Sirthenea nigra Cai & Tomokuni, 2004-01
- Sirthenea nigripes Murugan & Livingstone, 1990-01
- Sirthenea nigronitens (Miller, 1958)
- Sirthenea obscura Stål, 1866
- Sirthenea ocularis Horváth, 1909
- Sirthenea pedestris Horváth, 1909
- Sirthenea peruviana Drake & Harris, 1945
- Sirthenea picescens Reuter, 1887
- Sirthenea plagiata Horváth, 1909
- Sirthenea rapax Horváth, 1909
- Sirthenea rodhaini Schouteden, 1913
- Sirthenea sobria (Walker, 1873)
- Sirthenea stria (Fabricius, 1794)
- Sirthenea venezolana Maldonado, 1955
- Sirthenea vidua Horváth, 1909
- Sirthenea vittata Distant, 1902
