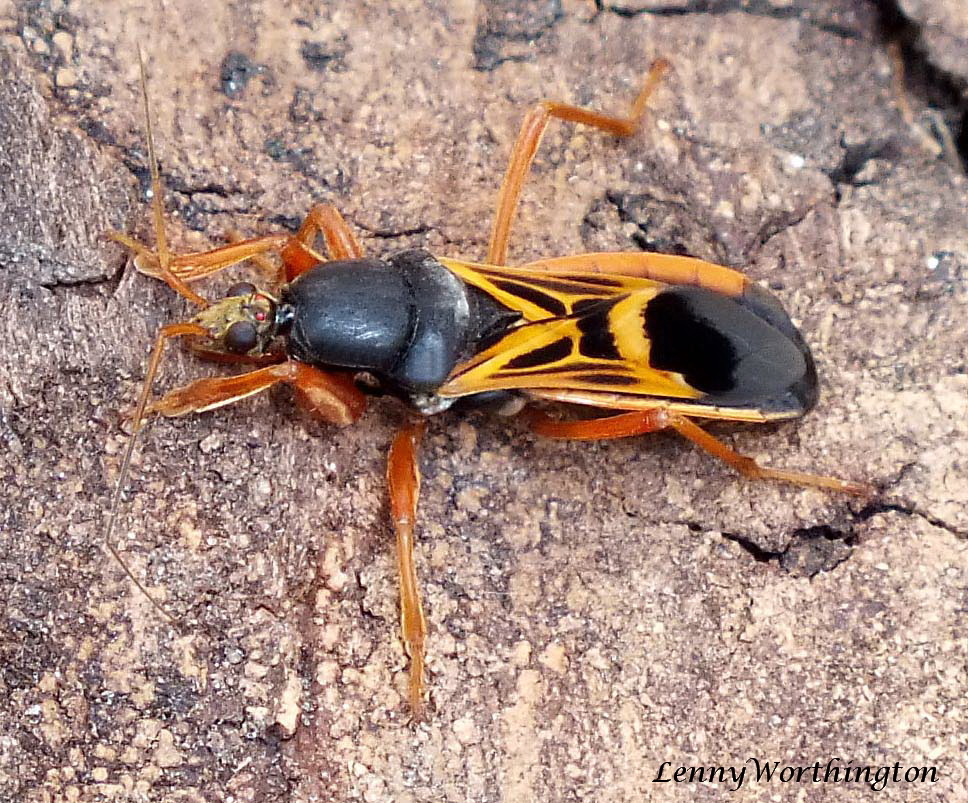
- Ectomocoris elegans

Scientific classification
- Kingdom: Animalia
- Phylum: Arthropoda
- Clade: Pancrustacea
- Class: Insecta
- Order: Hemiptera
- Suborder: Heteroptera
- Family: Reduviidae
- Subfamily: Peiratinae
- Genus: Ectomocoris; Mayr, 1865

Synonyms
- Callisphodrus Stål, 1866; Eumerus Klug in Ehrenberg, 1830

= Ectomocoris =

Genus of true bugs

Ectomocoris is a genus of assassin bugs in the subfamily Peiratinae, erected by Gustav Mayr in 1865. Species have been recorded from Africa, southern Europe, the Middle East South, East and SE Asia through to Australia.

== Species ==
Ectomocoris atrox

Ectomocoris biguttulus

As of November 2026, Biolib includes:

1. Ectomocoris abdominalis Villiers, 1948
2. Ectomocoris amseli Hoberlandt, 1961
3. Ectomocoris angusticeps Miller, 1948
4. Ectomocoris apicimaculatus Distant, 1919
5. Ectomocoris areolatus Villiers, 1963
6. Ectomocoris assabensis Horvath, 1914
7. Ectomocoris atrox (Stål, 1855)
8. Ectomocoris australicus (Reuter, 1881)
9. Ectomocoris bannaensis Ren, 1990
10. Ectomocoris basra Linnavuori, 1972
11. Ectomocoris biguttatus Schouteden, 1909
12. Ectomocoris biguttulus Stål, 1870
13. Ectomocoris binotatus Malipatil & Liu, 2023
14. Ectomocoris borealis Malipatil & Liu, 2023
15. Ectomocoris brachypterus (Gerstaecker, 1892)
16. Ectomocoris brooksi Miller, 1941
17. Ectomocoris brumalis Miller, 1958
18. Ectomocoris burgeoni Schouteden, 1931
19. Ectomocoris caccabatus Swanson, 2019
20. Ectomocoris cangyuanensis Ren, 1990
21. Ectomocoris caucasicus Linnavuori, 1961
22. Ectomocoris cheribonensis Miller, 1940
23. Ectomocoris chiragra (Fabricius, 1803)
24. Ectomocoris cognatus Miller, 1954
25. Ectomocoris cordatus (Wolff, 1804)
26. Ectomocoris cordiger Stål, 1866
27. Ectomocoris costatus Miller, 1954
28. Ectomocoris cruciger (Fabricius, 1803)
29. Ectomocoris cuneatus (Schouteden, 1931)
30. Ectomocoris cyaneus (Stål, 1863)
31. Ectomocoris decoratus (Stål, 1863)
32. Ectomocoris discoloripes (Reuter, 1881)
33. Ectomocoris dispar Miller, 1940
34. Ectomocoris distanti Cai & Lu, 1991
35. Ectomocoris elegans (Fabricius, 1803)
36. Ectomocoris erebus (Distant, 1904)
37. Ectomocoris fasciola (Reuter, 1881)
38. Ectomocoris fenestratus (Klug, 1830)
39. Ectomocoris flavipennis Reuter, 1881
40. Ectomocoris flavomaculatus Stål, 1870
41. Ectomocoris fugitivus Miller, 1950
42. Ectomocoris fuscatus Malipatil & Liu, 2023
43. Ectomocoris fuscifemoralis Malipatil & Liu, 2023
44. Ectomocoris gangeticus (Bergroth, 1894)
45. Ectomocoris gracilis Miller, 1958
46. Ectomocoris grandidieri Villiers, 1964
47. Ectomocoris gratiosus Miller, 1956
48. Ectomocoris hainanensis Ren, 1990
49. Ectomocoris horridus (Kirby, 1891)
50. Ectomocoris infuscatus Miller, 1954
51. Ectomocoris insignis (Bolivar, 1879)
52. Ectomocoris interiorius Malipatil & Liu, 2023
53. Ectomocoris jordanensis Linnavuori, 1961
54. Ectomocoris klugi Schouteden, 1909
55. Ectomocoris laevicollis Villiers, 1964
56. Ectomocoris lamottei Villiers, 1948
57. Ectomocoris lativentris Breddin, 1912
58. Ectomocoris latus Malipatil & Liu, 2023
59. Ectomocoris leucodermus Horvath, 1914
60. Ectomocoris limbatus Miller, 1952
61. Ectomocoris longruiensis Ren, 1990
62. Ectomocoris luridus (Klug, 1952)
63. Ectomocoris luteolus Malipatil & Liu, 2023
64. Ectomocoris maculicrus (Fairmaire, 1858)
65. Ectomocoris major Malipatil & Liu, 2023
66. Ectomocoris maldonadoi Cai & Lu, 1991
67. Ectomocoris mbaya Jeannel, 1916
68. Ectomocoris melanogaster (Fieber, 1861)
69. Ectomocoris melanopterus Distant, 1919
70. Ectomocoris menglaensis Ren, 1990
71. Ectomocoris mimomyrmix Miller, 1951
72. Ectomocoris montanus Villiers, 1948
73. Ectomocoris morosus (Gerstaecker, 1892)
74. Ectomocoris myrmecoides Jeannel, 1916
75. Ectomocoris nemrod Dispons, 1970
76. Ectomocoris nigeriensis Villiers, 1967
77. Ectomocoris nigrochripes Murugan & Livingstone, 1994
78. Ectomocoris ochronigrescens Moulet, 2000
79. Ectomocoris ochropterus Stål, 1873
80. Ectomocoris olthofi Miller, 1958
81. Ectomocoris ornatellus Schouteden, 1909
82. Ectomocoris ornatus (Stål, 1863)
83. Ectomocoris patricius (Stål, 1866)
84. Ectomocoris pauliani Villiers, 1964
85. Ectomocoris picturatus Distant, 1919
86. Ectomocoris pictus Distant, 1902
87. Ectomocoris poneroides Miller, 1950
88. Ectomocoris pretiosus Schouteden, 1931
89. Ectomocoris proximus Miller, 1952
90. Ectomocoris quadriguttatus (Fabricius, 1781)
91. Ectomocoris quadrimaculatus (Serville, 1831)
92. Ectomocoris royi Villiers, 1963
93. Ectomocoris rufifemur (Walker, 1873)
94. Ectomocoris sansibaricus Reuter, 1896
95. Ectomocoris sculpticollis Villiers, 1964
96. Ectomocoris semilugens Horvath, 1914
97. Ectomocoris signoreti Lethierry & Severin, 1891
98. Ectomocoris simulans Distant, 1919
99. Ectomocoris spinosus Malipatil & Liu, 2023
100. Ectomocoris steini Reuter, 1881
101. Ectomocoris tibialis Distant, 1904
102. Ectomocoris trimaculatus (Fallou, 1891)
103. Ectomocoris trinotatus Schouteden, 1909
104. Ectomocoris truculentus (Stål, 1863)
105. Ectomocoris tuberculatum Livingstone & Murugan, 1988
106. Ectomocoris ululans (Rossi, 1790)
107. Ectomocoris varipes Miller, 1950
108. Ectomocoris velox Miller, 1950
109. Ectomocoris vicinus Villiers, 1964
110. Ectomocoris vishnu Distant, 1904
111. Ectomocoris xanthopus (Schaum, 1853)
112. Ectomocoris xavierei Vennison & Ambrose, 1990
113. Ectomocoris yayeyamae (Matsumura, 1913)
114. Ectomocoris yunnanensis Ren, 1990
115. Ectomocoris zambiensis Villiers, 1973
116. Ectomocoris zhejiangensis Ren, 1990
117. Ectomocoris zhui Ren, 1990
