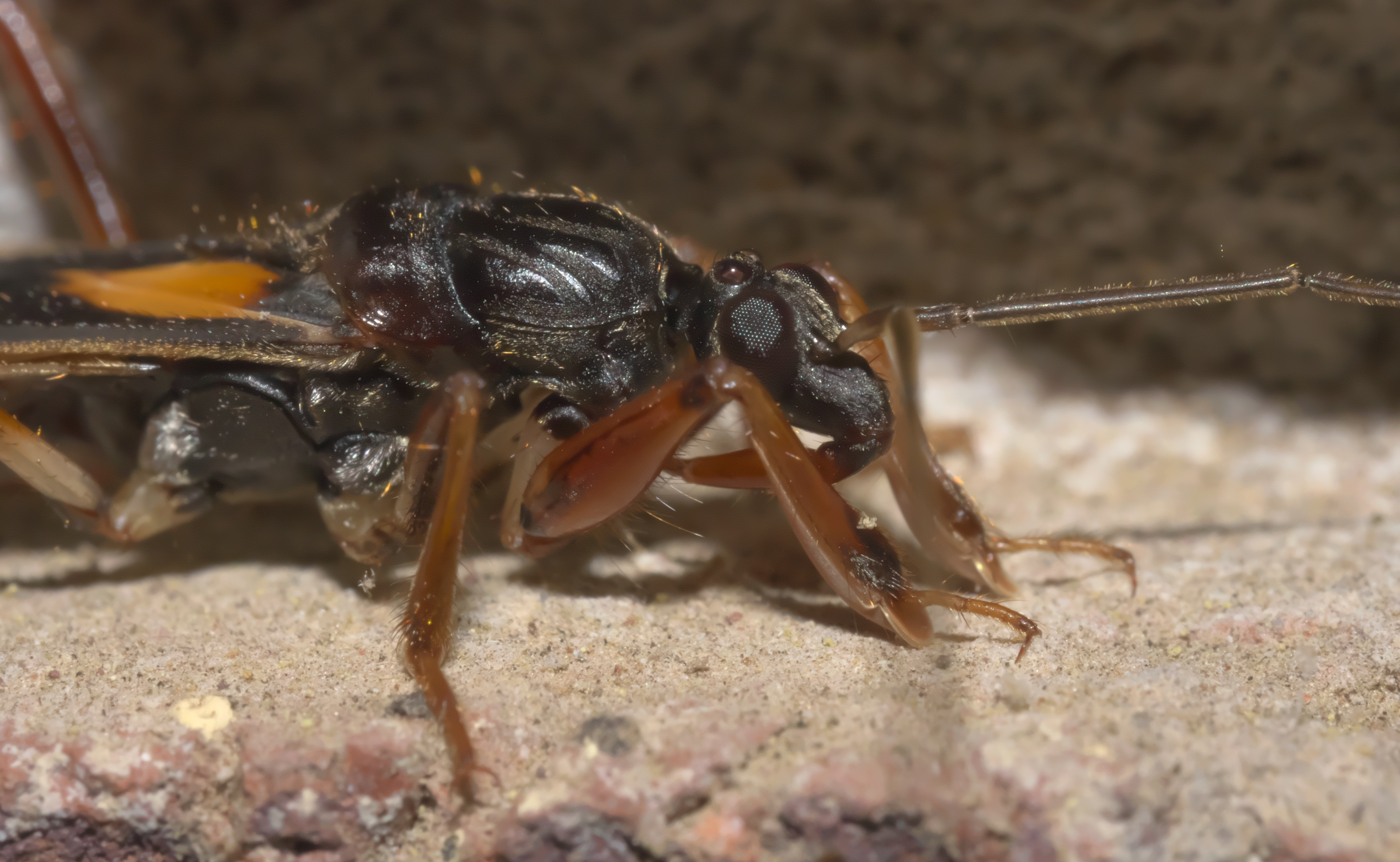
- Rasahus hamatus

Scientific classification
- Kingdom: Animalia
- Phylum: Arthropoda
- Clade: Pancrustacea
- Class: Insecta
- Order: Hemiptera
- Suborder: Heteroptera
- Family: Reduviidae
- Subfamily: Peiratinae
- Genus: Rasahus; Amyot and Serville, 1843

= Rasahus =

Genus of insects

Rasahus is a Neotropical genus of assassin bugs (Reduviidae); 26 species have been described.

== Partial species list ==
- Rasahus biguttatus (Say, 1832)
- Rasahus hamatus (Fabricius, 1781)
- Rasahus scutellaris (Fabricius, 1787)
- Rasahus sulcicollis (Serville, 1831)
- Rasahus thoracicus (Stål, 1872)
