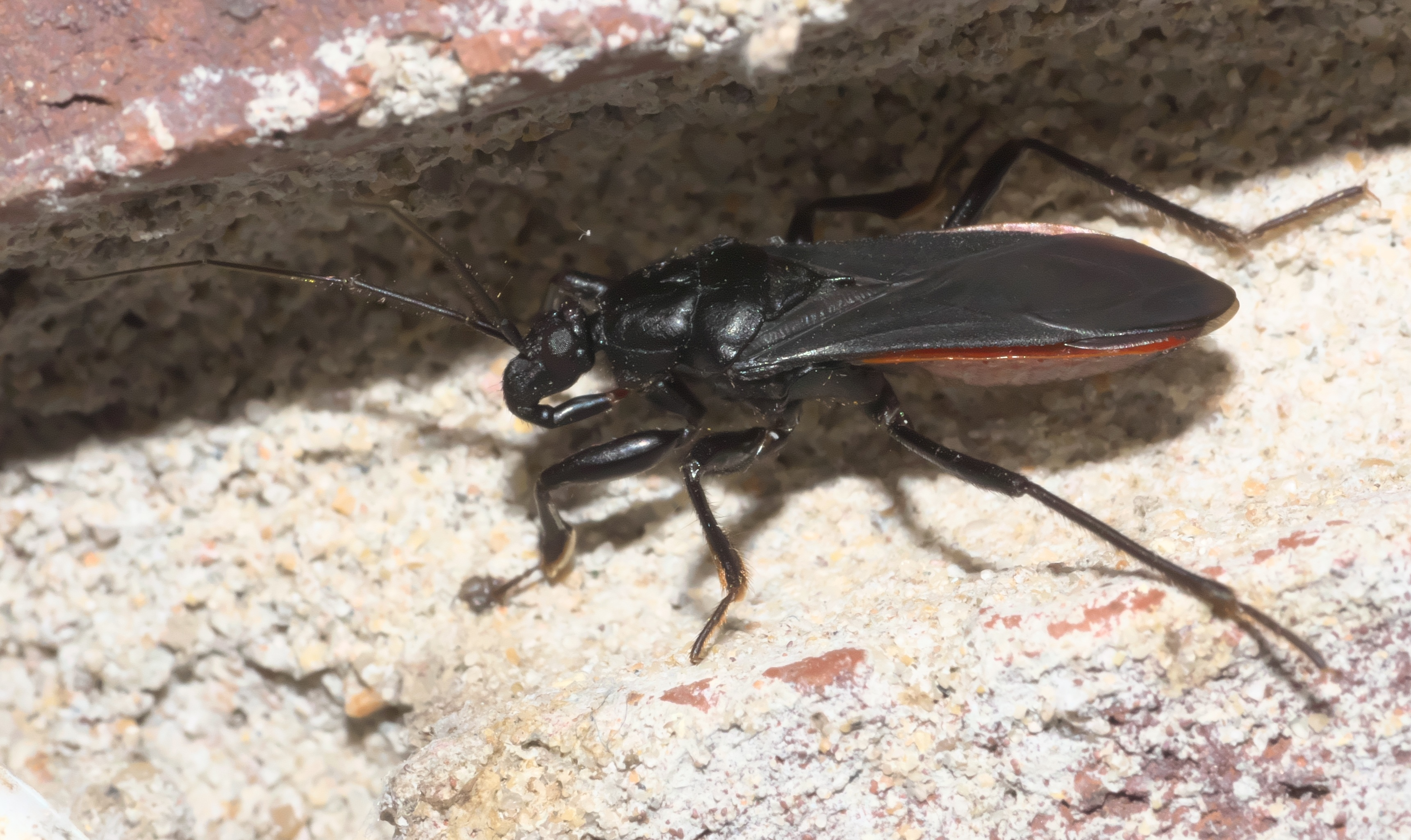
- adult male
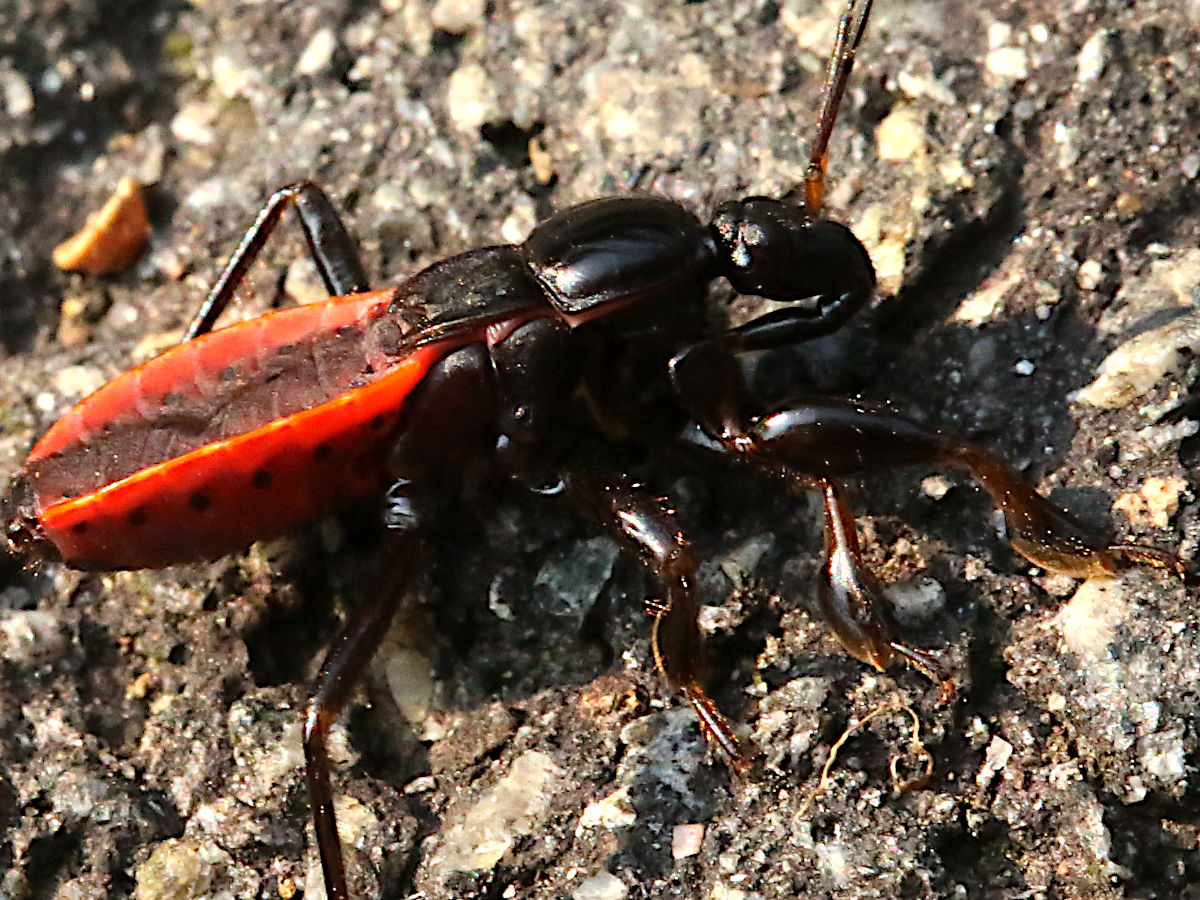
- nymph

Scientific classification
- Kingdom: Animalia
- Phylum: Arthropoda
- Class: Insecta
- Order: Hemiptera
- Suborder: Heteroptera
- Family: Reduviidae
- Genus: Melanolestes
- Species: M. picipes

Binomial name
- Melanolestes picipes (Herrich-schaeffer, 1848)

Synonyms
- Pirates picipes Herrich-Schaeffer, 1848

= Melanolestes picipes =

Species of true bug

Melanolestes picipes, known generally as the black corsair or black May beetle-eater, is a species of corsair in the family Reduviidae. It is found in Central America, North America, Oceania, and South America.

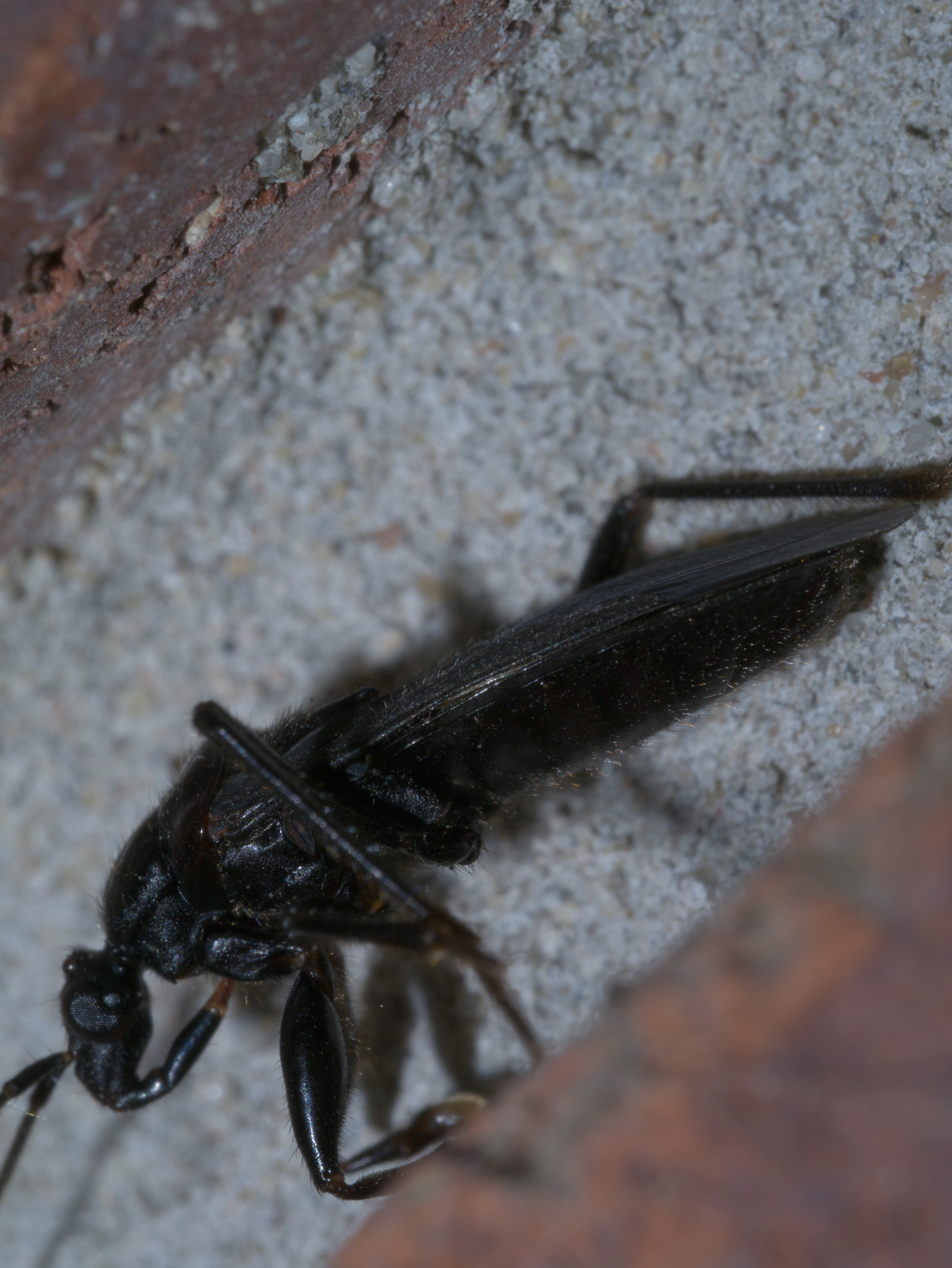
Black corsair, Melanolestes picipes

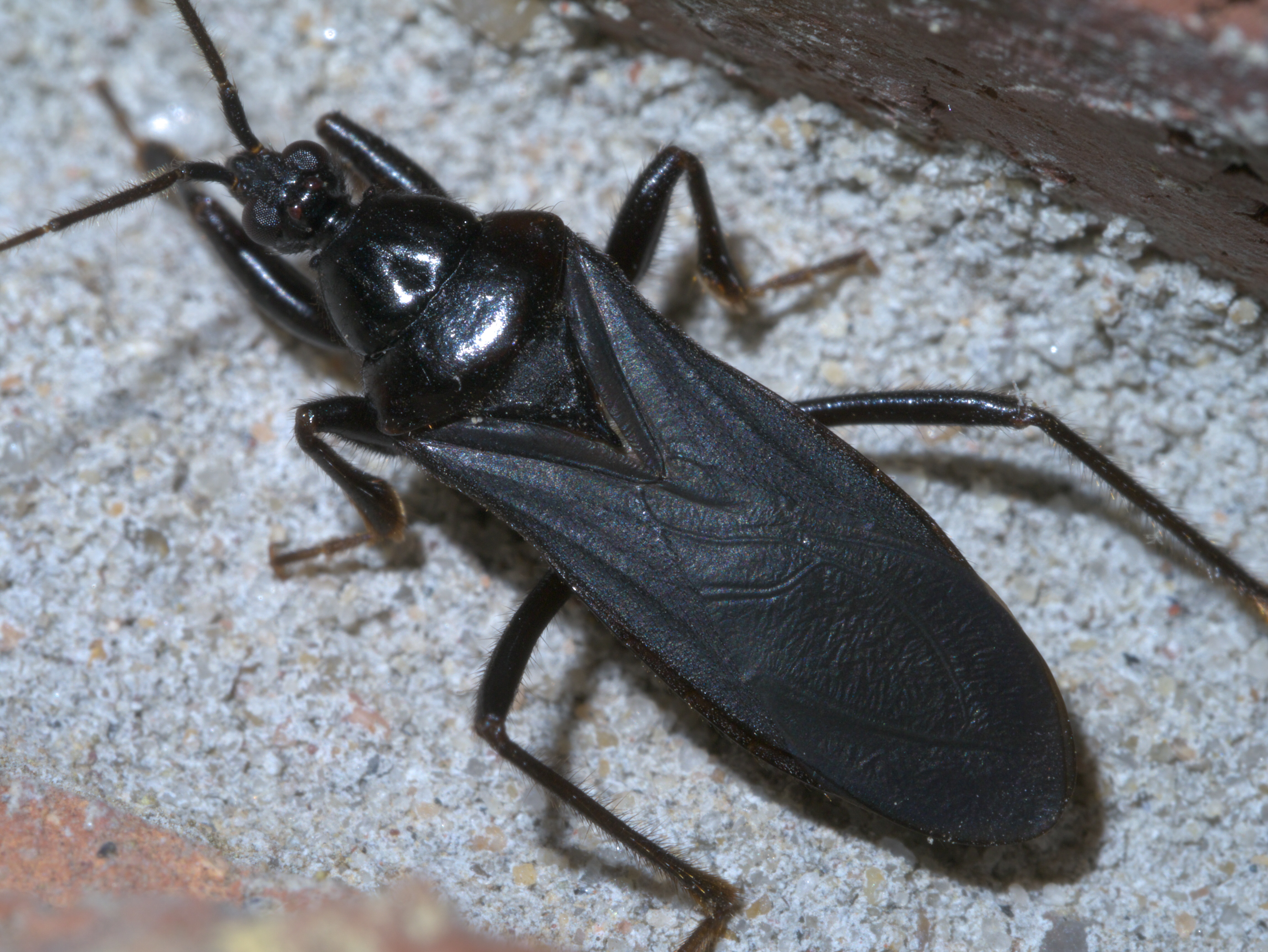
Black corsair, Melanolestes picipes
