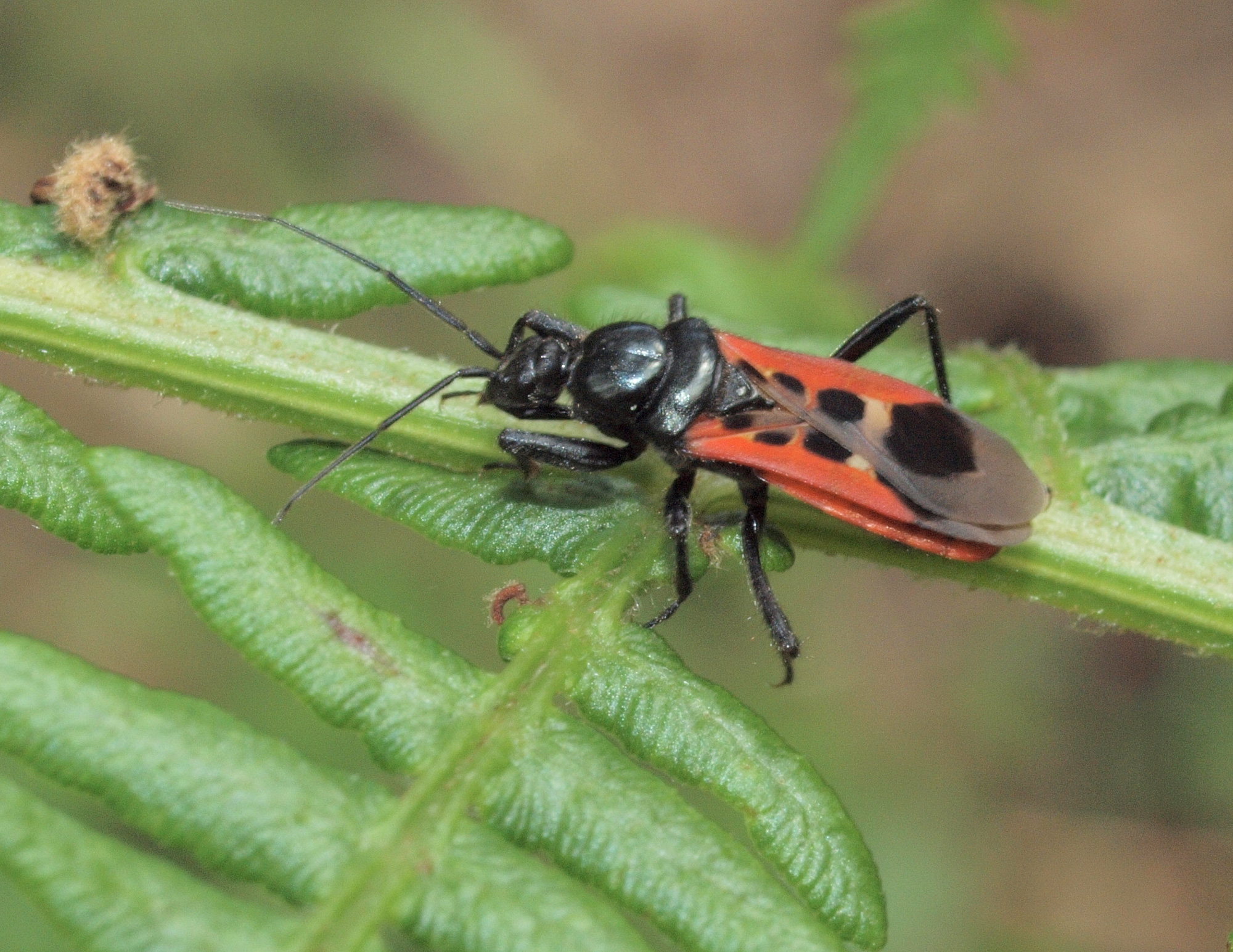
- Peirates stridulus

Scientific classification
- Kingdom: Animalia
- Phylum: Arthropoda
- Clade: Pancrustacea
- Class: Insecta
- Order: Hemiptera
- Suborder: Heteroptera
- Family: Reduviidae
- Subfamily: Peiratinae; Amyot and Serville, 1843

= Peiratinae =

Subfamily of true bugs

The Peiratinae are a subfamily of assassin bugs (Reduviidae) known as corsairs. The subfamily has a worldwide distribution, but is concentrated in tropical areas.

The type genus Peirates Serville sensu stricto is one of the largest genera of Peiratinae with species mainly distributed in the Oriental, Palearctic and Ethiopian regions. After 1831, the subfamily changed many times as new species were being discovered. Peirates has been identified to have a very different biology from Sirthenea, which is found on all continents.

== Genera ==
As of November 2026, Biolib includes:

1. Androclus Stål, 1863
2. Austropeirates Malipatil & Liu, 2024
3. Bekilya Villiers, 1949
4. Brachysandalus Stål, 1866
5. Calistocoris Reuter, 1881
6. Catamiarus Amyot & Serville, 1843
7. Ceratopirates Schouteden, 1933
8. Chaulioleistes Swanson, 2019
9. Ectomocoris Mayr, 1865
10. Eidmannia Taeuber, 1934
11. Froeschnerisca Coscarón, 1997
12. Fusius Stål, 1862
13. Hovacoris Villiers, 1964
14. Lamotteus Villiers, 1948
15. Lentireduvius Cai & Taylor, 2006
16. Lestomerus Amyot & Serville, 1843
17. Melanolestes Stål, 1866
18. Microcleptocoris Villiers, 1968
19. Microsandalus Stål, 1866
20. Mutillocoris Villiers, 1964
21. Neopirates Miller, 1952
22. Oblongiala Liu & Cai, 2020
23. Pachysandalus Jeannel, 1916
24. Parapirates Villiers, 1959
25. Peirates Audinet-Serville, 1831
26. Phalantus Stål, 1863
27. Phorastes Kirkaldy, 1900
28. Polychitonocoris Miller, 1940
29. Pseudolestomerus Villiers, 1964
30. Pteromalestes Miller, 1959
31. Rapites Villiers, 1948
32. Rasahus Amyot and Serville, 1843
33. Sirthenea Spinola, 1837
34. Thymbreus Stål, 1859
35. Tydides Stål, 1865
36. Zeraikia Gil-Santana & Costa, 2003
