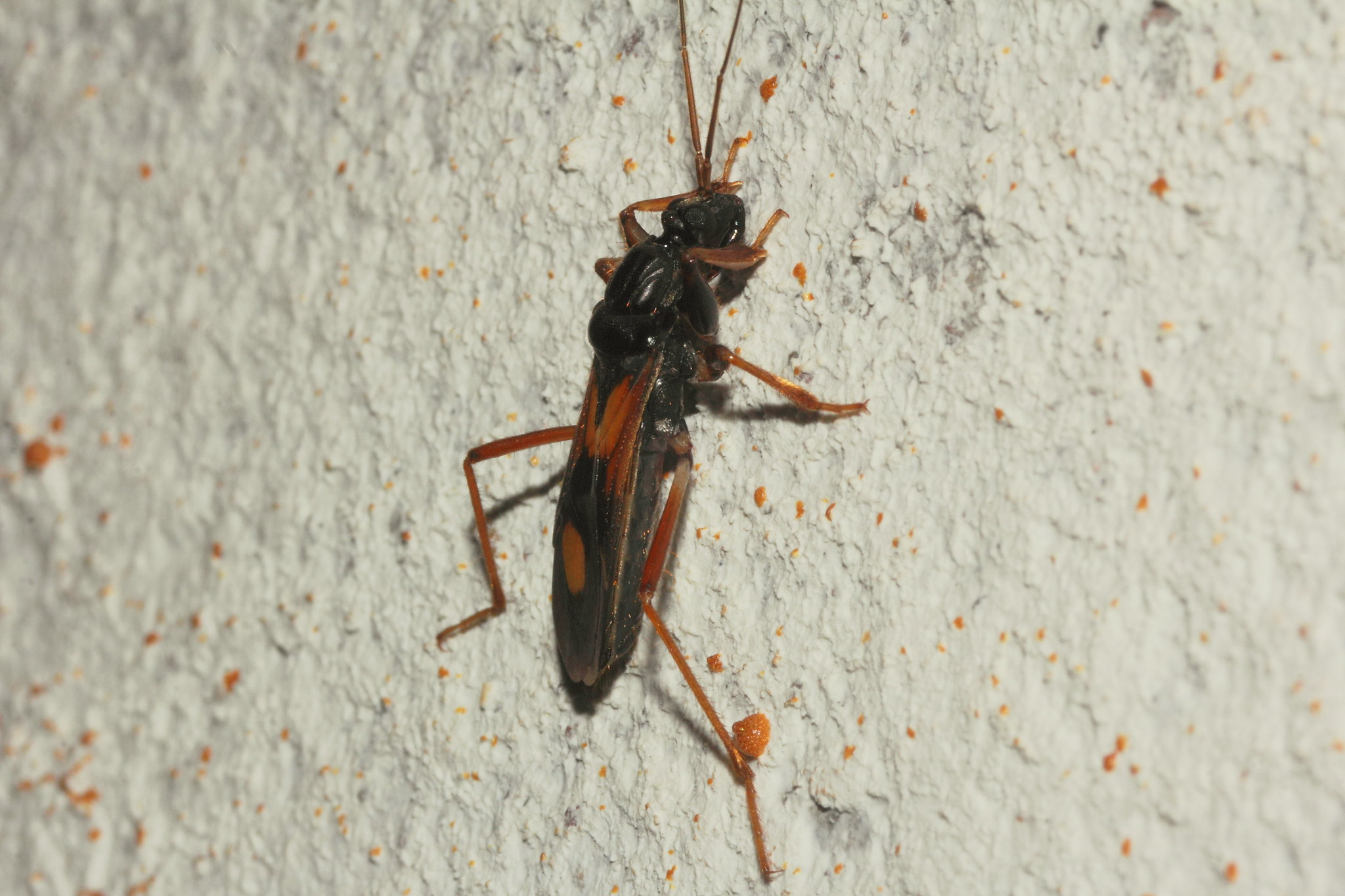

Scientific classification
- Domain: Eukaryota
- Kingdom: Animalia
- Phylum: Arthropoda
- Class: Insecta
- Order: Hemiptera
- Suborder: Heteroptera
- Family: Reduviidae
- Genus: Rasahus
- Species: R. biguttatus

Binomial name
- Rasahus biguttatus (Say, 1832)

= Rasahus biguttatus =

Species of true bug

Rasahus biguttatus is a species of assassin bug in the family Reduviidae. It is found in the Caribbean Sea, Central America, North America, and South America.
