= Ectrichodiini =

Scientific classification
- Kingdom: Animalia
- Phylum: Arthropoda
- Clade: Pancrustacea
- Class: Insecta
- Order: Hemiptera
- Suborder: Heteroptera
- Family: Reduviidae
- Subfamily: Ectrichodiinae
- Tribe: Ectrichodiini; Amyot & Serville, 1843

Tribe of insects

Ectrichodiini is a tribe of millipede assassin bugs.

== Taxonomy ==
Ectrichodiini contains the following genera:

- Sinchocoris
- Cimbus
- Rhysostethus
- Pseudozirta
- Glymmatophora
- Microstemmidea
- Paracleptria
- Caecina
- Bayerus
- Jorgcoris
- Hexamerocerus
- Sciaphilocoris
- Parascadra
- Ectrychotoides
- Daraxa
- Antiopuloides
- Xenorhyncocoris
- Choucoris
- Audernacus
- Nebriscoides
- Racelda
- Cricetopareis
- Katanga
- Bannania
- Maraenaspis
- Microsanta
- Mendis
- Sphinctocoris
- Rhiginia
- Nebriscus
- Mendola
- Zirta
- Santosia
- Pseudopothea
- Libavius
- Philodoxus
- Mascaregnasa
- Antiopula
- Austrokatanga
- Tamaonia
- Tanindrazanus
- Libaviellus
- Brontostoma
- Glymmatophora
- Vilius
- Schottus
- Labidocoris
- Adrania
- Neoscadra
- Guionius
- Neosantosia
- Pothea
- Lyramna
- Neozirta
- Ectrychotes
- Scadra
- Ectrichodia
- Cleptria
- Haematorrhophus
- Haematoloecha
