= Cecina =

Cecina may refer to

- Cecina (river), a river in Tuscany, Italy
- Cecina (meat), a Spanish and Mexican culinary specialty made of beef
- Cecina (gastropod), a genus of freshwater snails in the family Pomatiopsidae
- Cecina, Tuscany, Italy
- Caecinia gens, an ancient Roman family
- Farinata, a culinary specialty made of chickpea flour

== See also ==
- Caecina (disambiguation)
- Čečina (disambiguation)
