= Caecina =

Caecina may refer to:

- Caecinia gens, an ancient Roman family
- Caecina (bug), a genus of assassin bugs
- Caecina, a synonym for Porphyrogenes, a genus of butterflies
- Cecina, Tuscany, Italy

== See also ==
- Cecina (disambiguation)
