= Čečina =

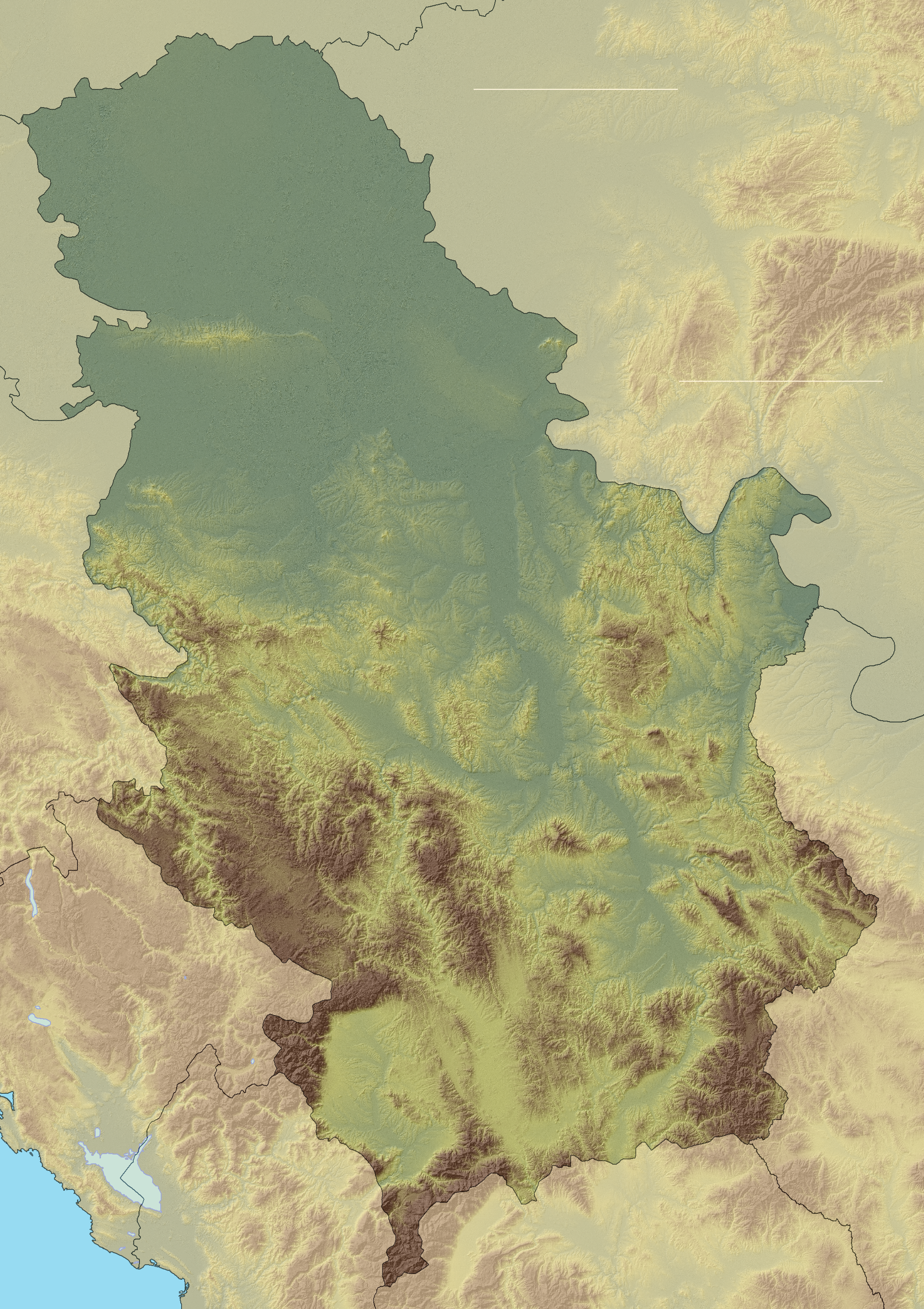

Čečina (Serbian Cyrillic: Чечина) is a Serbian place name. It may refer to the following two settlements in Serbia:

- Čečina, Ivanjica
- Čečina, Doljevac
