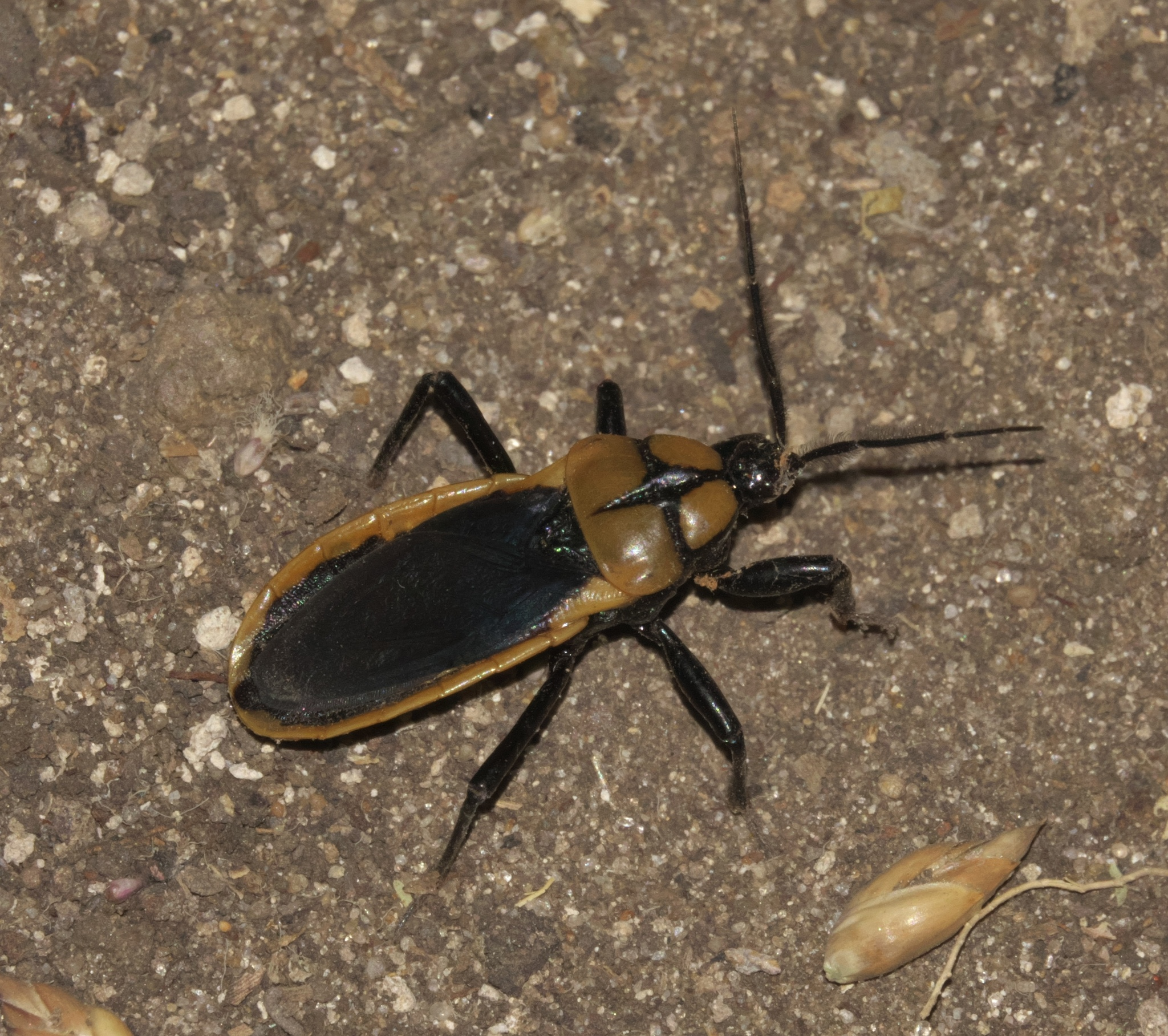
- Ectrichodia crux, Namibia

Scientific classification
- Kingdom: Animalia
- Phylum: Arthropoda
- Class: Insecta
- Order: Hemiptera
- Suborder: Heteroptera
- Family: Reduviidae
- Subfamily: Ectrichodiinae
- Genus: Ectrichodia
- Species: E. crux

Binomial name
- Ectrichodia crux (Thunberg, 1783)

= Ectrichodia crux =

Species of true bugs

Ectrichodia crux is a species of assassin bug in the family Reduviidae. It is found mainly in southern Africa.
