= Neozirta =

Scientific classification
- Kingdom: Animalia
- Phylum: Arthropoda
- Clade: Pancrustacea
- Class: Insecta
- Order: Hemiptera
- Suborder: Heteroptera
- Family: Reduviidae
- Subfamily: Ectrichodiinae
- Tribe: Ectrichodiini
- Genus: Neozirta; Distant, 1919

Genus of insects

Neozirta is a genus of millipede assassin bugs.

== Description ==
Assassin bugs of the Neozirta genus possess four-jointed antennae, with the length of their heads slightly shorter than the antennae's first joint. The region behind the eyes is constricted, while those between and in front of the eyes are ridged. They strongly resemble the neotropical genus Zirta, but are distinguished by the narrower and shorter anterior lobe of the pronotum and the shorter and broader scutellum.

== Taxonomy ==
Neozirta contains the following species:

- Neozirta orientalis
- Neozirta eidmanni
