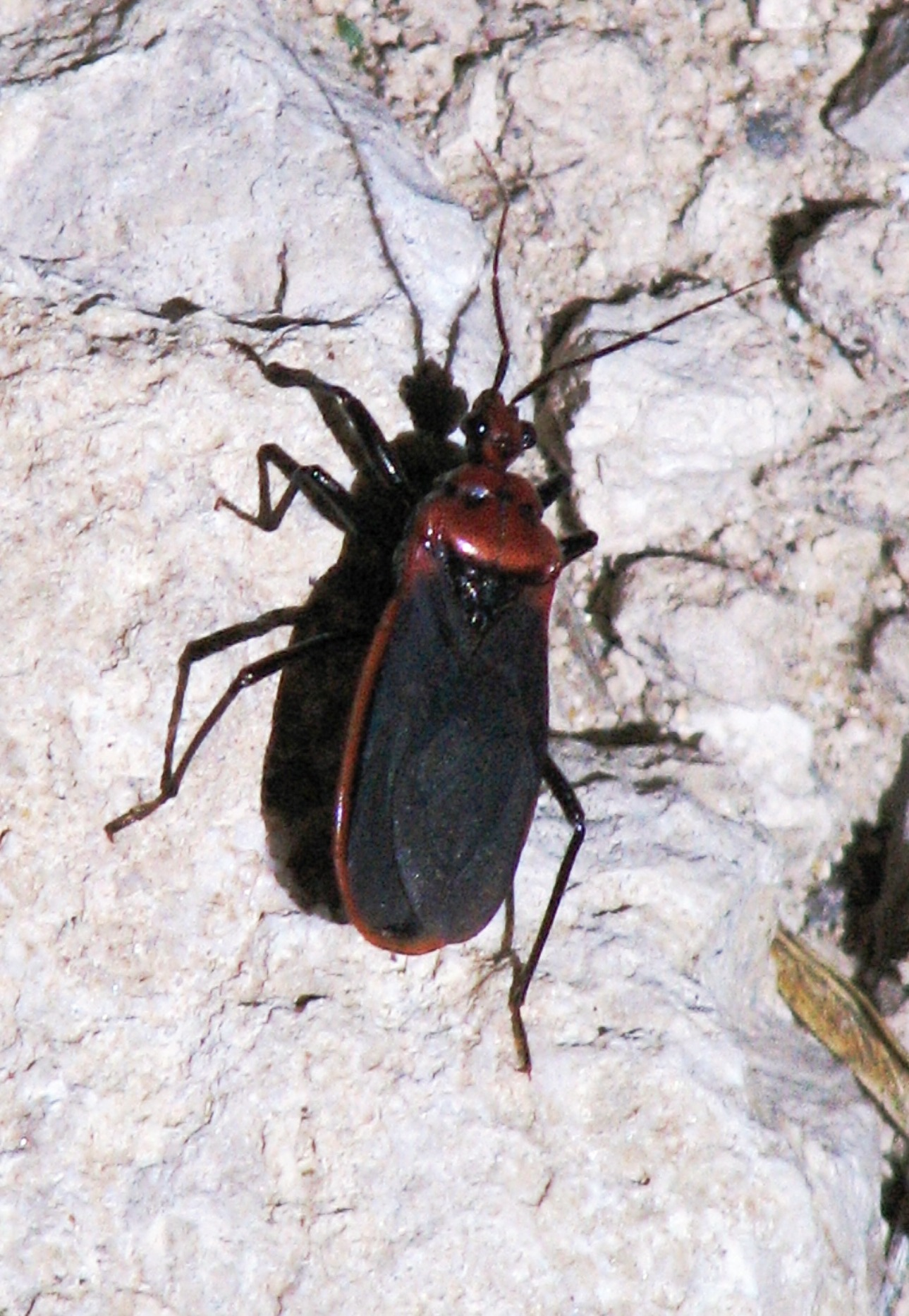

Scientific classification
- Kingdom: Animalia
- Phylum: Arthropoda
- Clade: Pancrustacea
- Class: Insecta
- Order: Hemiptera
- Suborder: Heteroptera
- Family: Reduviidae
- Genus: Rhiginia
- Species: R. cinctiventris

Binomial name
- Rhiginia cinctiventris (Stål, 1872)

= Rhiginia cinctiventris =

Species of true bug

Rhiginia cinctiventris is a species of millipede assassin in the family Reduviidae. It is found in Central America and North America.
