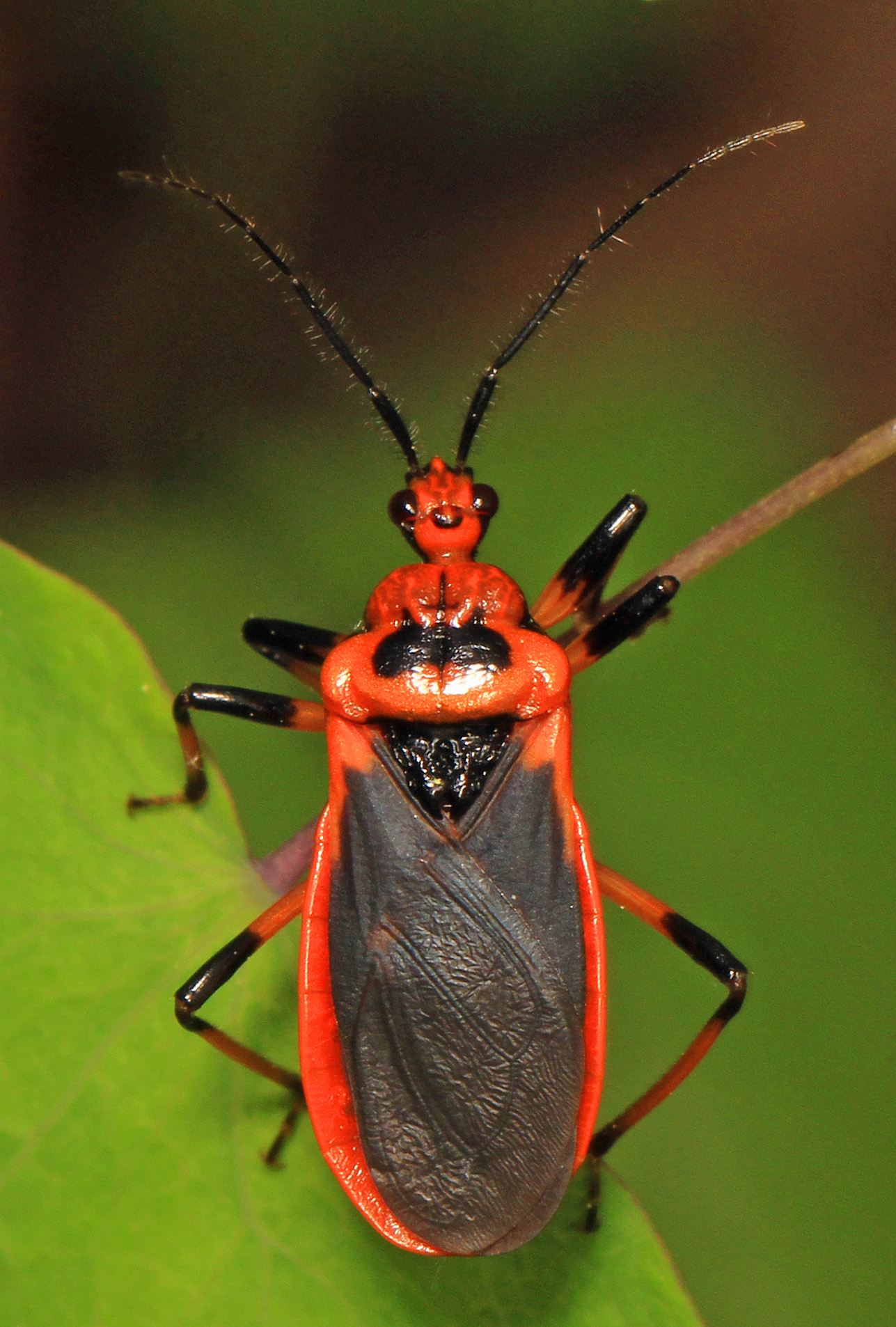

Scientific classification
- Domain: Eukaryota
- Kingdom: Animalia
- Phylum: Arthropoda
- Class: Insecta
- Order: Hemiptera
- Suborder: Heteroptera
- Family: Reduviidae
- Genus: Rhiginia
- Species: R. cruciata

Binomial name
- Rhiginia cruciata (Say, 1832)

= Rhiginia cruciata =

Species of true bug

Rhiginia cruciata, commonly known as the scarlet-bordered assassin bug or cruciate assassin bug, is a species of millipede assassin in the family Reduviidae. It is found in the Caribbean, Central America, and North America.
