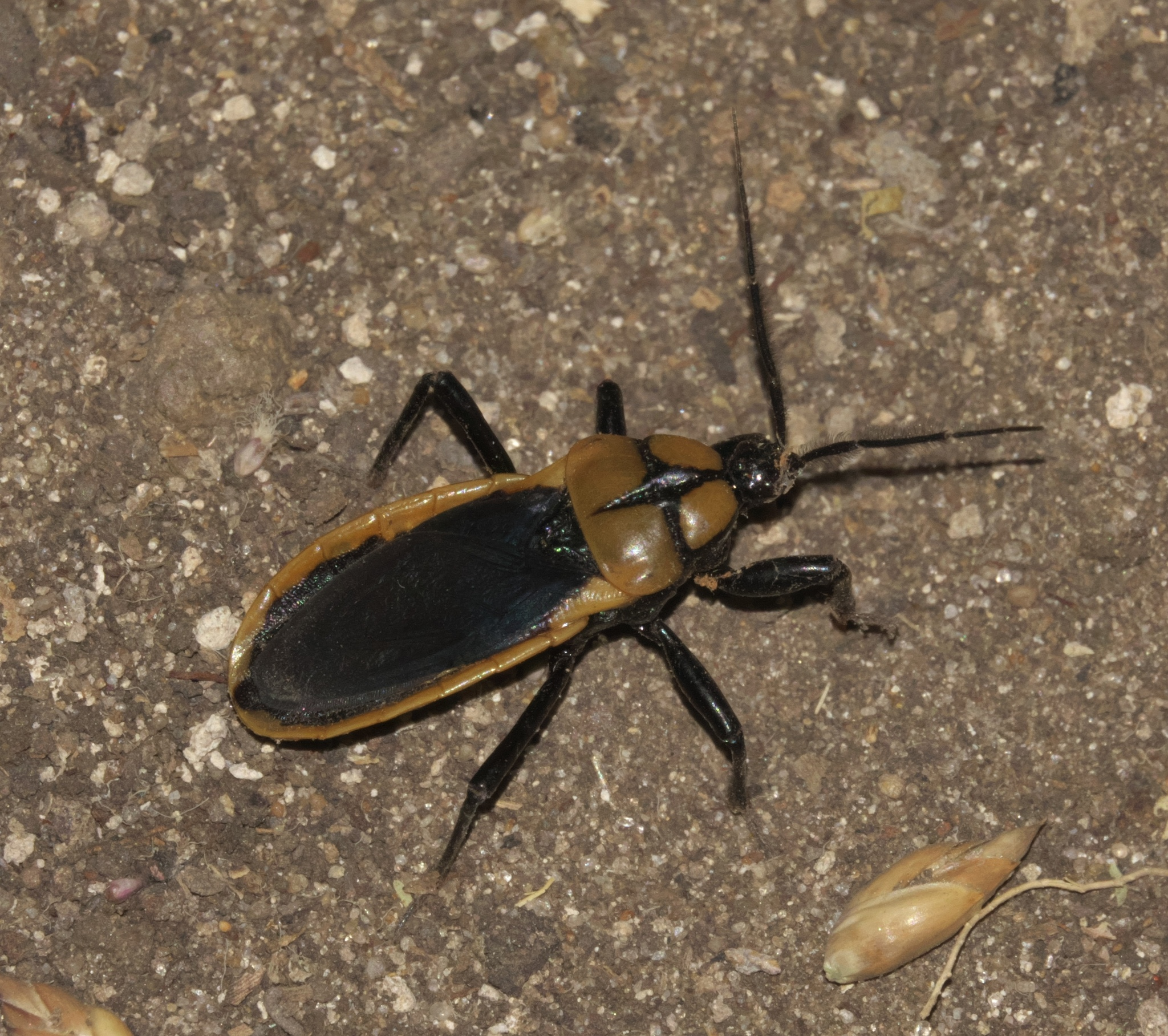
- Ectrichodia crux, Namibia

Scientific classification
- Kingdom: Animalia
- Phylum: Arthropoda
- Clade: Pancrustacea
- Class: Insecta
- Order: Hemiptera
- Suborder: Heteroptera
- Family: Reduviidae
- Subfamily: Ectrichodiinae
- Genus: Ectrichodia; Lepeletier & Serville, 1825

= Ectrichodia =

Genus of true bugs

Ectrichodia is a genus of assassin bugs in the family Reduviidae; it is the type genus of the subfamily Ectrichodiinae and tribe Ectrichodiini. Species of Ectrichodia are found mainly in southern Africa.

== Species ==
These 34 species belong to the genus Ectrichodia:

- Ectrichodia abbreviata (Distant, 1903)
- Ectrichodia andersoni (Kirby, 1895)
- Ectrichodia antennalis Stål, 1859
- Ectrichodia barbicornis (Fabricius, 1775)
- Ectrichodia bigemmis (Stål, 1855)
- Ectrichodia carinulata (Stål, 1874)
- Ectrichodia carnifex Gerstaecker, 1873
- Ectrichodia collarti Schouteden, 1931
- Ectrichodia crux (Thunberg, 1783)
- Ectrichodia cuprea Breddin, 1905
- Ectrichodia dimera (Karsch, 1892)
- Ectrichodia distincta (Signoret, 1782)
- Ectrichodia diversipes Walker, 1873
- Ectrichodia gigas (Herrich-Schaeffer, 1848)
- Ectrichodia humeralis Breddin, 1903
- Ectrichodia lucida (Lepeletier & Serville, 1825)
- Ectrichodia marginicolllis Walker, 1873
- Ectrichodia mozambica Villiers, 1945
- Ectrichodia nigriceps Villiers, 1945
- Ectrichodia nigripes Stal, 1859
- Ectrichodia pictipes Walker, 1873
- Ectrichodia pyrophila Walker, 1873
- Ectrichodia rodhaini (Schouteden, 1919)
- Ectrichodia roulingi Schouteden, 1919
- Ectrichodia royi Villiers, 1963
- Ectrichodia rubrifemur Breddin, 1901
- Ectrichodia sagonai Schouteden, 1929
- Ectrichodia senegalensis (Schouteden, 1919)
- Ectrichodia spec Valdes, 1910
- Ectrichodia suta Bergroth, 1914
- Ectrichodia tarsalis Stål, 1859
- Ectrichodia tinantae Schouteden, 1929
- Ectrichodia uelensis Schouteden, 1931
- Ectrichodia vedyi Schouteden, 1952
