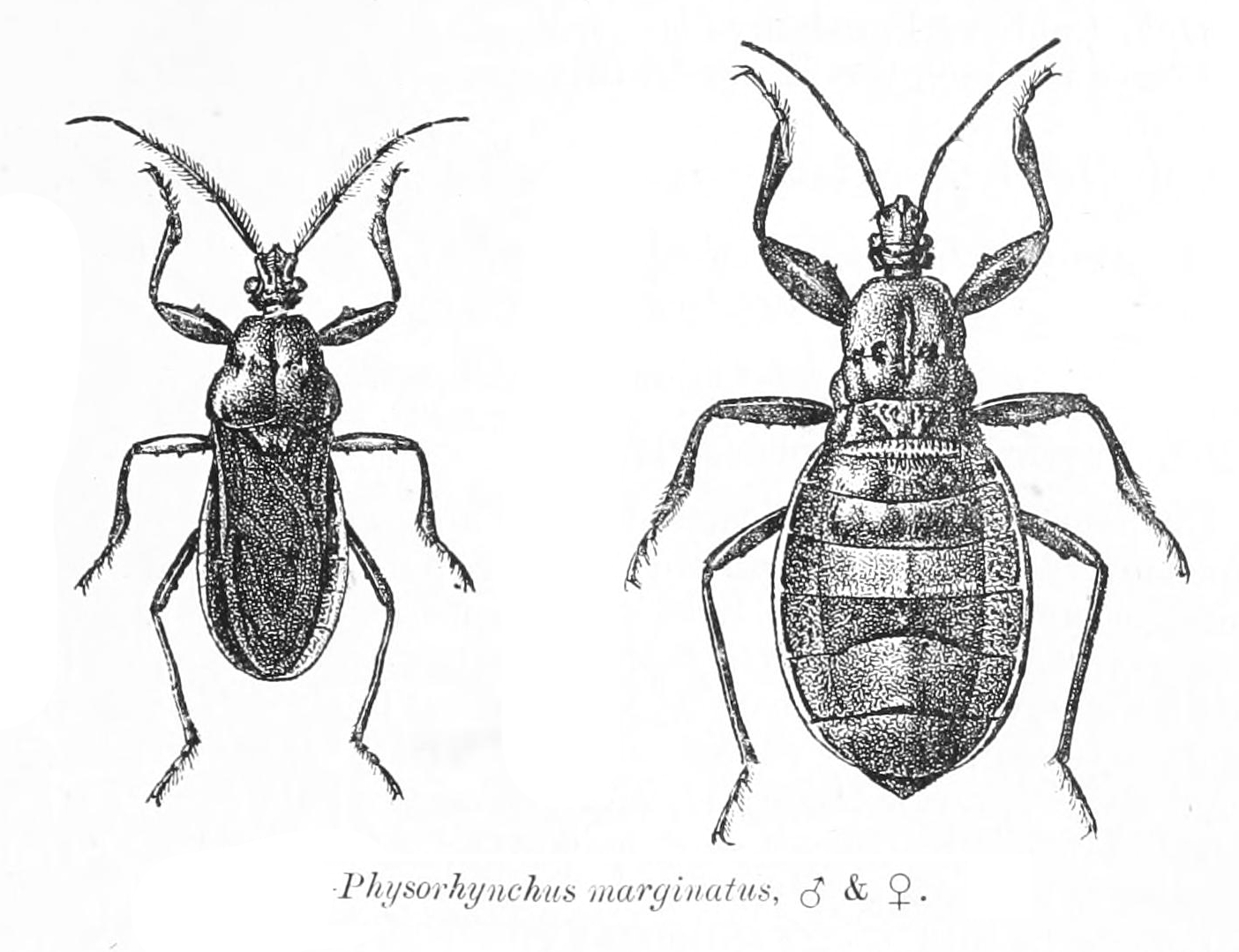
- Haematorrhophus marginatus (male and female)

Scientific classification
- Kingdom: Animalia
- Phylum: Arthropoda
- Clade: Pancrustacea
- Class: Insecta
- Order: Hemiptera
- Suborder: Heteroptera
- Family: Reduviidae
- Subfamily: Ectrichodiinae
- Genus: Haematorrhophus; Stål, 1874

Type species
- Ectrichodia linnaei Stål, 1859

Synonyms
- Physorhynchus Amyot & Serville, 1843

= Haematorrhophus =

Genus of insects

Haematorrhophus is a genus of assassin bugs in the subfamily Ectrichodiinae which specialize on millipede prey. Adult females are large, robust, and wingless. They have a six-segmented antenna which is longer in the males and less hairy in females. The first antennal segment is almost as long as the head. The fore femora are thickened and have tubercles on the underside. The fore-tibiae have a spongy furrow at the apex.

Species in the genus include:

- Haematorrhophus foevalis Murugan & Livingstone, 1995 - India
- Haematorrhophus horrendus (Kirkaldy, 1902) - India
- Haematorrhophus javadiensis Hegde, 1989 - India
- Haematorrhophus linnaei (Stål, 1859) - Sri Lanka
- Haematorrhophus malabaricus (Distant, 1904) - Western Ghats of India
- Haematorrhophus marginatus (Reuter, 1881)- India
- Haematorrhophus nigroviolaceus (Reuter, 1881) - India
- Haematorrhophus pedestris (Distant, 1904) - India
- Haematorrhophus rubromaculatus (Distant, 1904) - India
- Haematorrhophus ruguloscutelleris Murugan & Livingstone, 1995
- Haematorrhophus segnis (Bergroth, 1915) - India
- Haematorrhophus talpus (Distant, 1904) - India
- Haematorrhophus tuberculatus (Stål, 1874) - Collection location unknown
