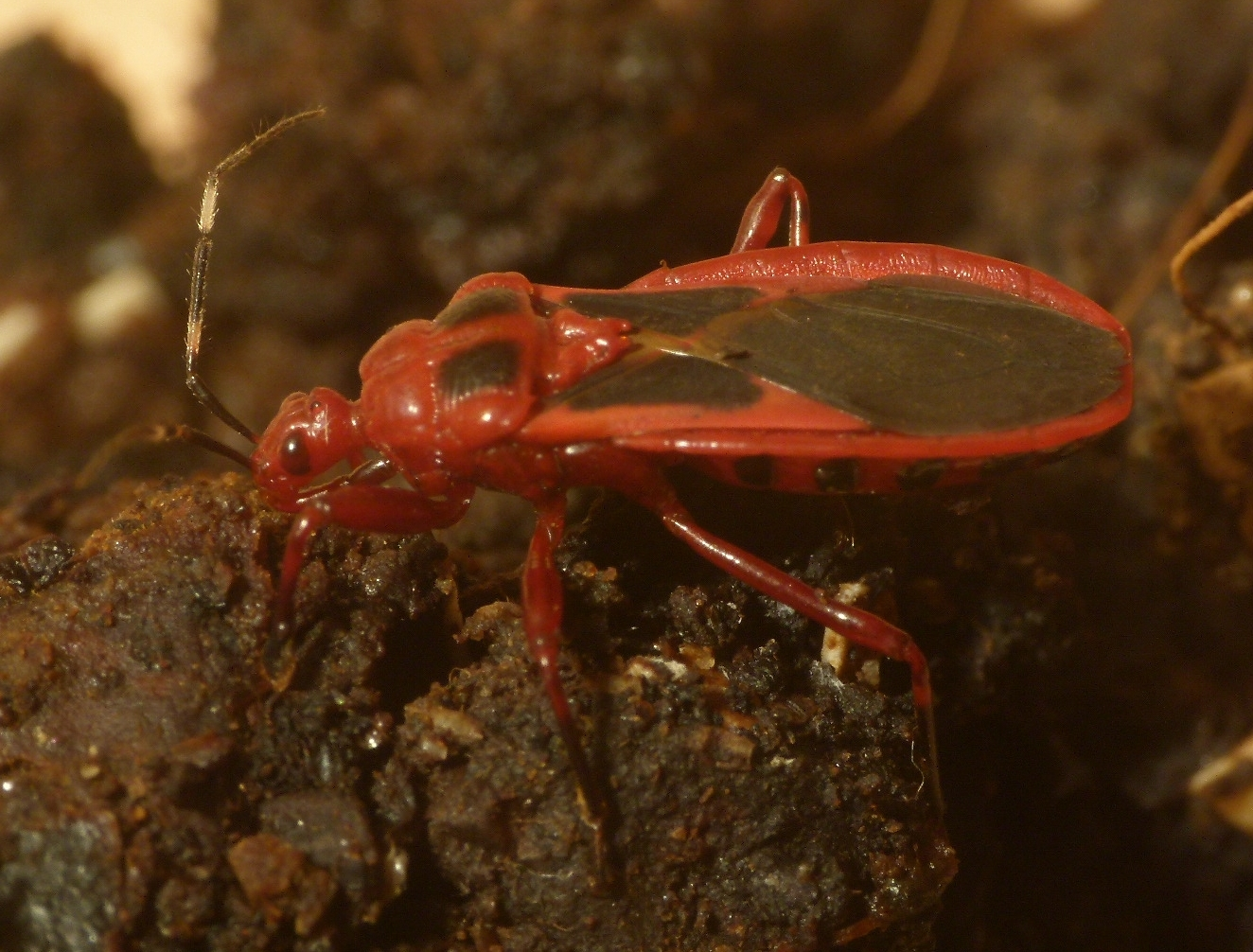
- Scadra annulipes

Scientific classification
- Kingdom: Animalia
- Phylum: Arthropoda
- Clade: Pancrustacea
- Class: Insecta
- Order: Hemiptera
- Suborder: Heteroptera
- Family: Reduviidae
- Subfamily: Ectrichodiinae
- Genus: Scadra; Stål, 1859

Type species
- Physorhynchus lanius Stål, 1855

= Scadra =

Genus of insects

Scadra is a genus of assassin bug with species distributed in South and Southeast Asia.

Species that have been included in the genus are:

- Scadra aliena (Walker, 1873) - Java
- Scadra amoenula Miller, 1954 - Java
- Scadra annulicornis Reuter, 1881 - Sri Lanka
- Scadra annulipes Reuter, 1881 - India
- Scadra atricapilla Distant, 1909 - India
- Scadra castanea Paiva, 1919 - India
- Scadra chaseni Miller, N.C.E., 1941
- Scadra cincticornis Kirby, 1891 - Sri Lanka
- Scadra consimilis Miller, 1954 - Sumatra
- Scadra costalis (Lethierry, 1888) - Nias Island
- Scadra dohertyi Miller, 1941 - Sumbawa I.
- Scadra fuscicrus Stål, 1859 - Sri Lanka
- Scadra gemella Miller, 1954 - Singapore
- Scadra hanitschi Miller, 1941
- Scadra illuminata Distant, 1910 - Philippines
- Scadra luteola Miller, 1941 -
- Scadra lanius (Stål, 1855) - Java
- Scadra niaculiventris Stål, 1863 - India
- Scadra militaris Distant, 1909 - India
- Scadra munda Miller, N.C.E., 1941
- Scadra nigritula Breddin, 1905 - Java
- Scadra okinawensis (Matsumura), 1905 - Ryukyu Is.
- Scadra porrigens (Walker, 1873) - Philippines
- Scadra rufidens Stål, 1859 - Philippines
- Scadra rufithorax Breddin, 1903 - Japan
- Scadra scutellaris Distant, 1904 - India
- Scadra silvicola Miller, N.C.E., 1941
- Scadra tibialis Distant, 1904 - India
- Scadra wuchenfui China, 1940 - China
