= Čečina, Ivanjica =

Čečina Чечина
- Village
- Location within Serbia
- Coordinates: 43°25′N 20°23′E
- Country: Serbia
- District: Moravica District
- Municipality: Ivanjica

Area
  - Total: 20.93 km^{2} (8.08 sq mi)

Population (2011)
  - Total: 190
  - Density: 9.1/km^{2} (24/sq mi)
- Time zone: UTC+1 (CET)
  - Summer (DST): UTC+2 (CEST)

Čečina is a village in the municipality of Ivanjica, Serbia. According to the 2011 census, the village has a population of 190 inhabitants.
