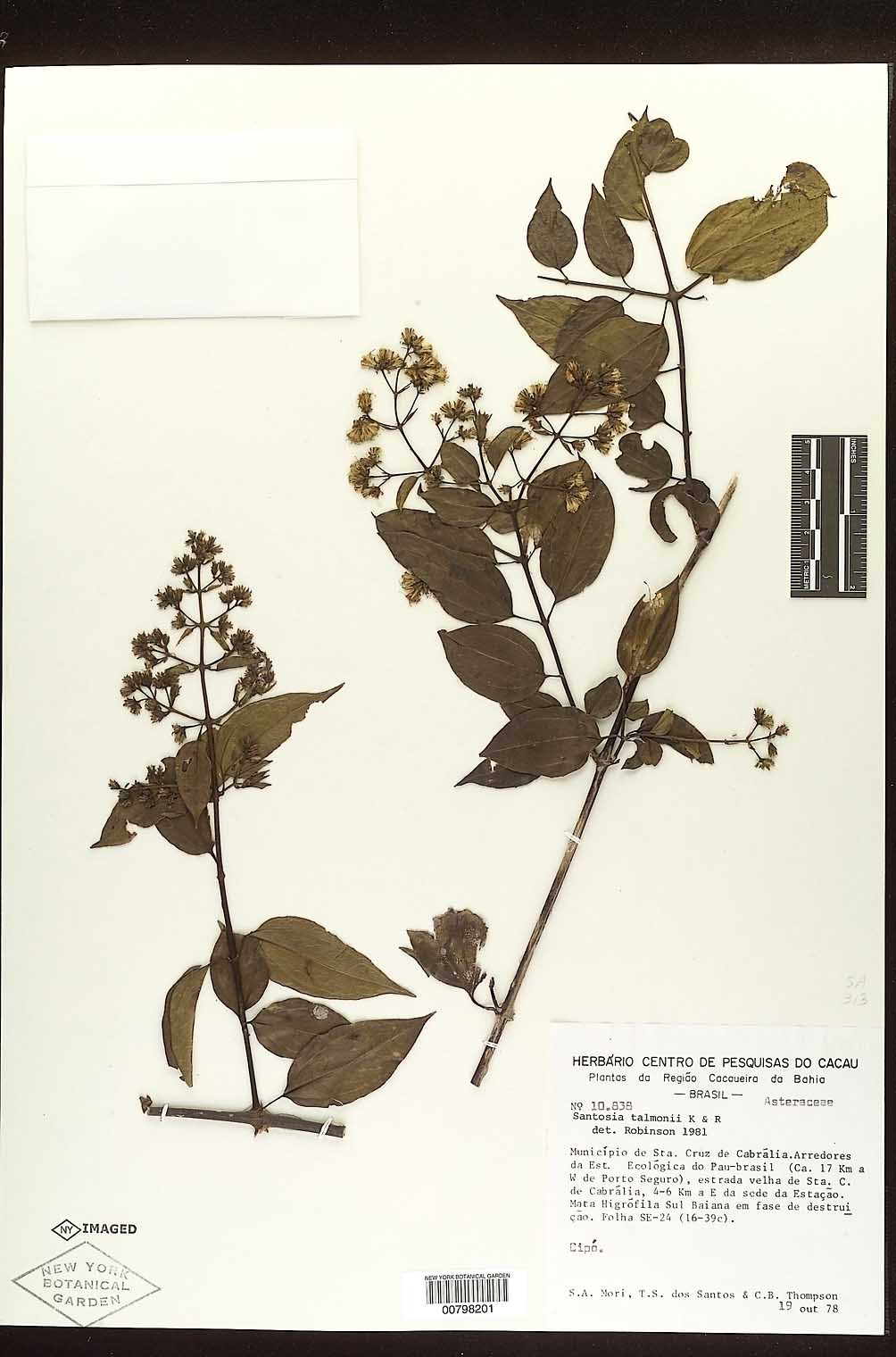

Scientific classification
- Kingdom: Plantae
- Clade: Tracheophytes
- Clade: Angiosperms
- Clade: Eudicots
- Clade: Asterids
- Order: Asterales
- Family: Asteraceae
- Subfamily: Asteroideae
- Tribe: Eupatorieae
- Genus: Santosia; R.M.King & H.Rob.
- Species: S. talmonii

Binomial name
- Santosia talmonii R.M.King & H.Rob.

Synonyms
- Eupatorium pseudolaeve Soar.Nunes

= Santosia =

Genus of Brazilian plants

Santosia is a genus of Brazilian plants in the tribe Eupatorieae within the family Asteraceae.

The genus was named for Brazilian biologist Talmon S. dos Santos.

Species

The only known species is Santosia talmonii, native to the State of Bahia in eastern Brazil.
