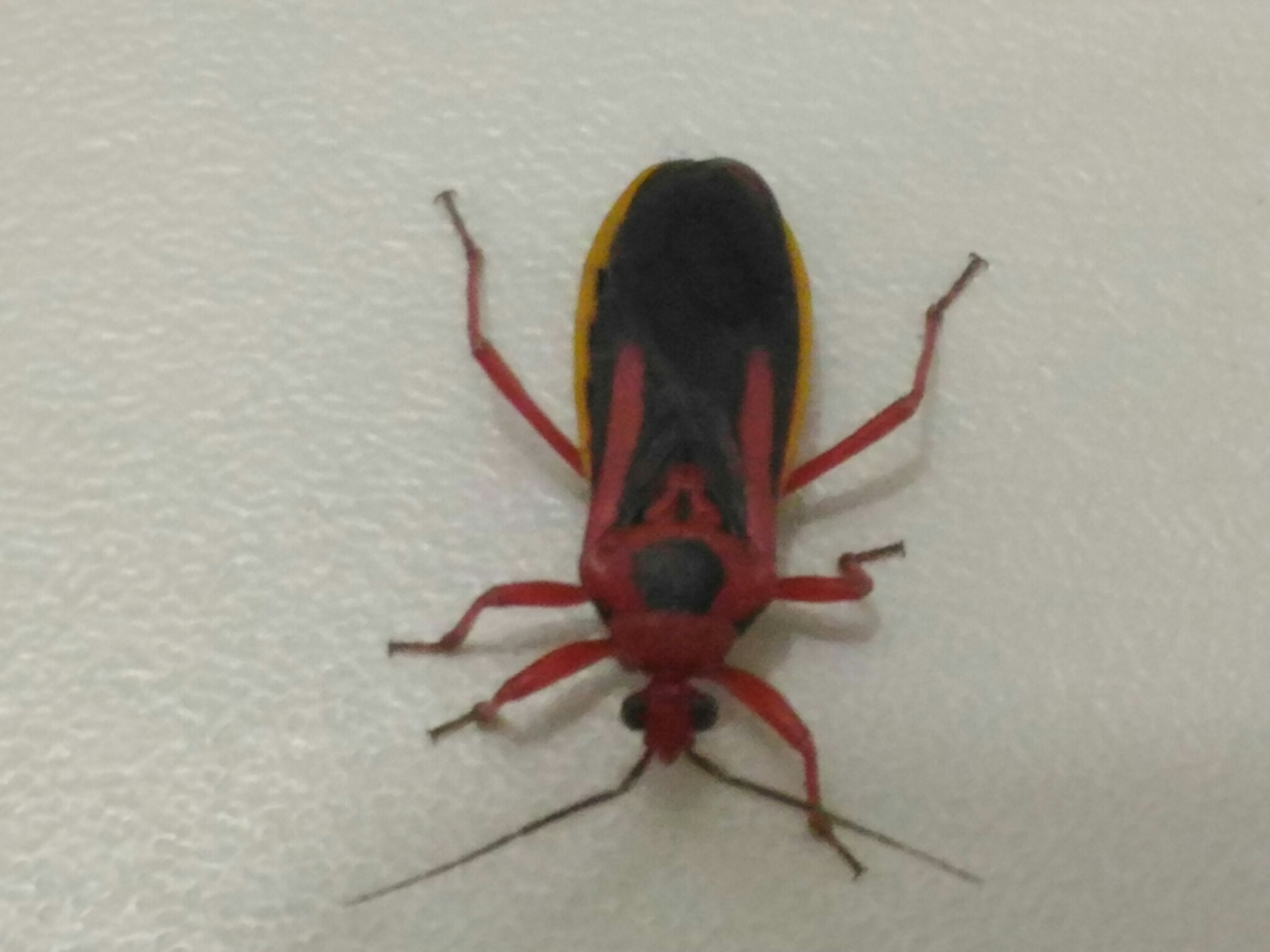
- Brontostoma discus

Scientific classification
- Domain: Eukaryota
- Kingdom: Animalia
- Phylum: Arthropoda
- Class: Insecta
- Order: Hemiptera
- Suborder: Heteroptera
- Family: Reduviidae
- Subfamily: Ectrichodiinae
- Genus: Brontostoma; Kirkaldy, 1904

= Brontostoma =

Genus of true bugs

Brontostoma is a neotropical genus of assassin bugs in the family Reduviidae. About 20 species have been described. These species are brightly colored with reds and oranges, and like all members of the Ectrichodiinae, specialize on millipede prey.

== Partial list of species ==
- Brontostoma bahiensis Gil-Santana 2004
- Brontostoma deferreri
- Brontostoma discus Burmeister, 1835
- Brontostoma diringshofeni
- Brontostoma notatum
- Brontostoma rubrum
- Brontostoma sanguinosum Stål, 1872
- Brontostoma trux
