= Austrokatanga =

Austrokatanga monteithi

Scientific classification
- Kingdom: Animalia
- Phylum: Arthropoda
- Class: Insecta
- Order: Hemiptera
- Suborder: Heteroptera
- Family: Reduviidae
- Subfamily: Ectrichodiinae
- Genus: Austrokatanga; Weirauch, 2009
- Species: A. monteithi

Binomial name
- Austrokatanga monteithi Weirauch, 2009

Genus of true bugs

Austrokatanga monteithi is a species of assassin bug, the sole member of its genus, in the subfamily Ectrichodiinae of Reduviidae. This species is found in Australia.
