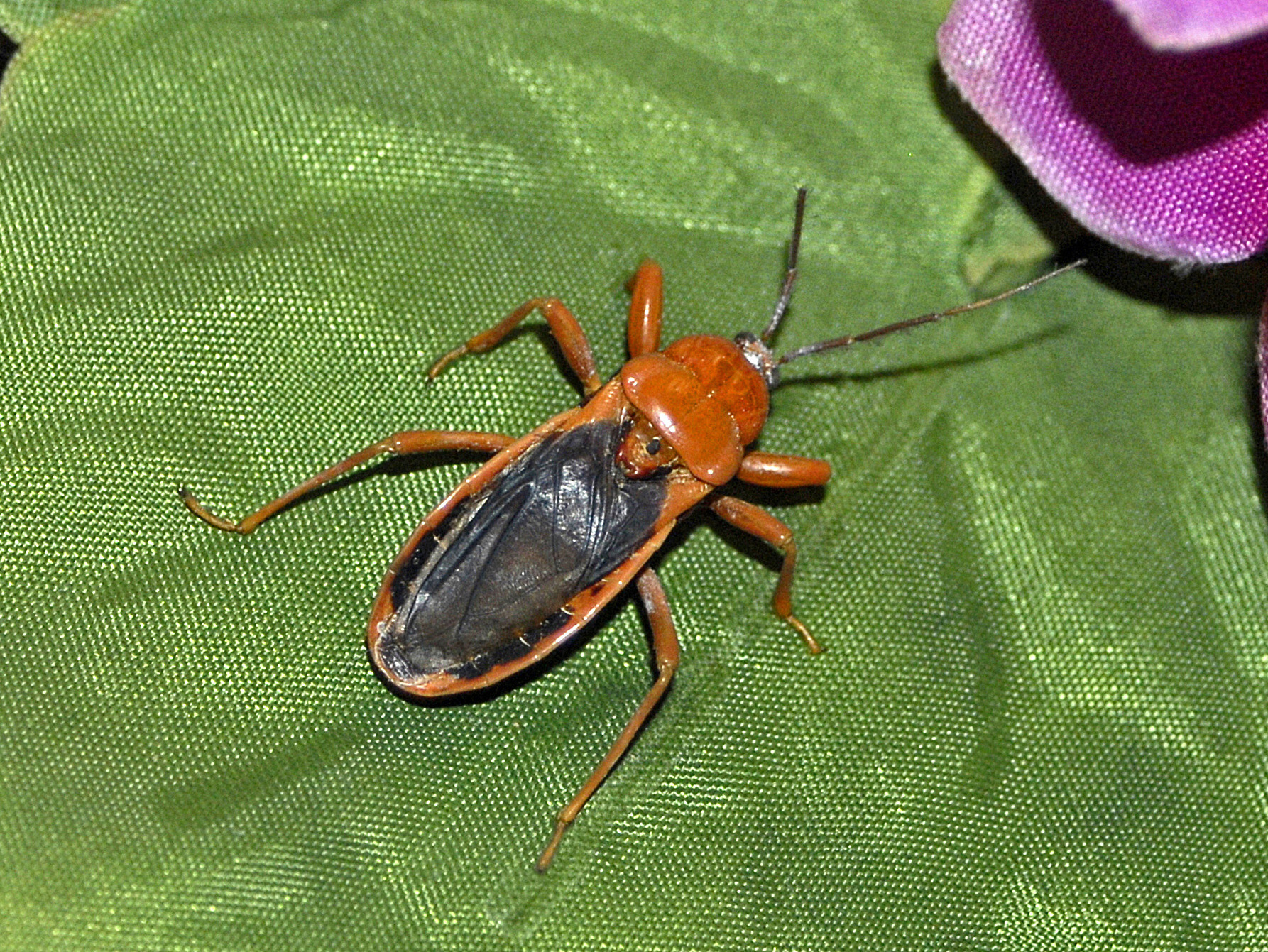
- Glymmatophora species

Scientific classification
- Kingdom: Animalia
- Phylum: Arthropoda
- Class: Insecta
- Order: Hemiptera
- Suborder: Heteroptera
- Family: Reduviidae
- Subfamily: Ectrichodiinae
- Genus: Glymmatophora; Stål, 1855

Synonyms
- Glymmatophoroides Miller, 1953

= Glymmatophora =

Genus of true bugs

Glymmatophora, the metallic assassin bugs, is a genus of assassin bugs belonging to the family Reduviidae.

== Description ==
These medium-sized bugs are brightly metallic red or orange and bluish black or dark brown colored, an aposematic coloration. The females are wingless and are similar to the nymphs.

Members of this genus are known for hunting diplopods, giant African millipedes, by injecting them with a fast acting venom . They usually hide under leaf litter and sometimes boulders and prey at night.

== Distribution ==
Species within this genus can be found throughout Southern Africa.

== Species ==
Species within this genus include:

- Glymmatophora aeniceps Horvath, 1914
- Glymmatophora amazonica Villiers, 1948
- Glymmatophora angolana Villiers, 1952
- Glymmatophora angulata Miller, 1956
- Glymmatophora costalis (Distant, 1903)
- Glymmatophora crassipes Horváth, 1914
- Glymmatophora dejoncki Schouteden, 1919
- Glymmatophora dimorpha (de Jonck, 1898)
- Glymmatophora dubia (Schouteden, 1909)
- Glymmatophora eques Breddin, 1913
- Glymmatophora erythrodera (Schaum, 1853)
- Glymmatophora horvathi Schouteden, 1931
- Glymmatophora loangwae Schouteden, 1919
- Glymmatophora lomanicola Villiers, 1971
- Glymmatophora lotei Villiers, 1948
- Glymmatophora lundensis Villiers, 1950
- Glymmatophora machadoi Villiers, 1950
- Glymmatophora manicae Miller, 1950
- Glymmatophora mashonae Miller, 1950
- Glymmatophora nana Miller, 1956
- Glymmatophora natalensis (Stål, 1855)
- Glymmatophora overlaeti Schouteden, 1931
- Glymmatophora patricia (Stål, 1855)
- Glymmatophora pellax Horvath, 1914
- Glymmatophora rhodesiana Miller, 1950
- Glymmatophora rubripes Stål, 1853
- Glymmatophora rufipes (de Jonck, 1898)
- Glymmatophora schoutedeni Horvath, 1906
- Glymmatophora semirubra Horvath, 1914
- Glymmatophora sheffieldi Schouteden, 1919
- Glymmatophora submetallica Stål, 1855
- Glymmatophora sudanica Schouteden, 1919
- Glymmatophora swalei Schouteden, 1919
- Glymmatophora ugandana Horvath, 1914
- Glymmatophora venustiterga Hesse, 1925
- Glymmatophora viridescens Miller, 1956
