= Čečina, Doljevac =

Čečina Чечина
- Village
- Location within Serbia
- Country: Serbia
- Region: Southern and Eastern Serbia
- District: Nišava
- Municipality: Doljevac
- Time zone: UTC+1 (CET)
  - Summer (DST): UTC+2 (CEST)

Čečina is a village situated in Doljevac municipality, Nišava District in Serbia.
