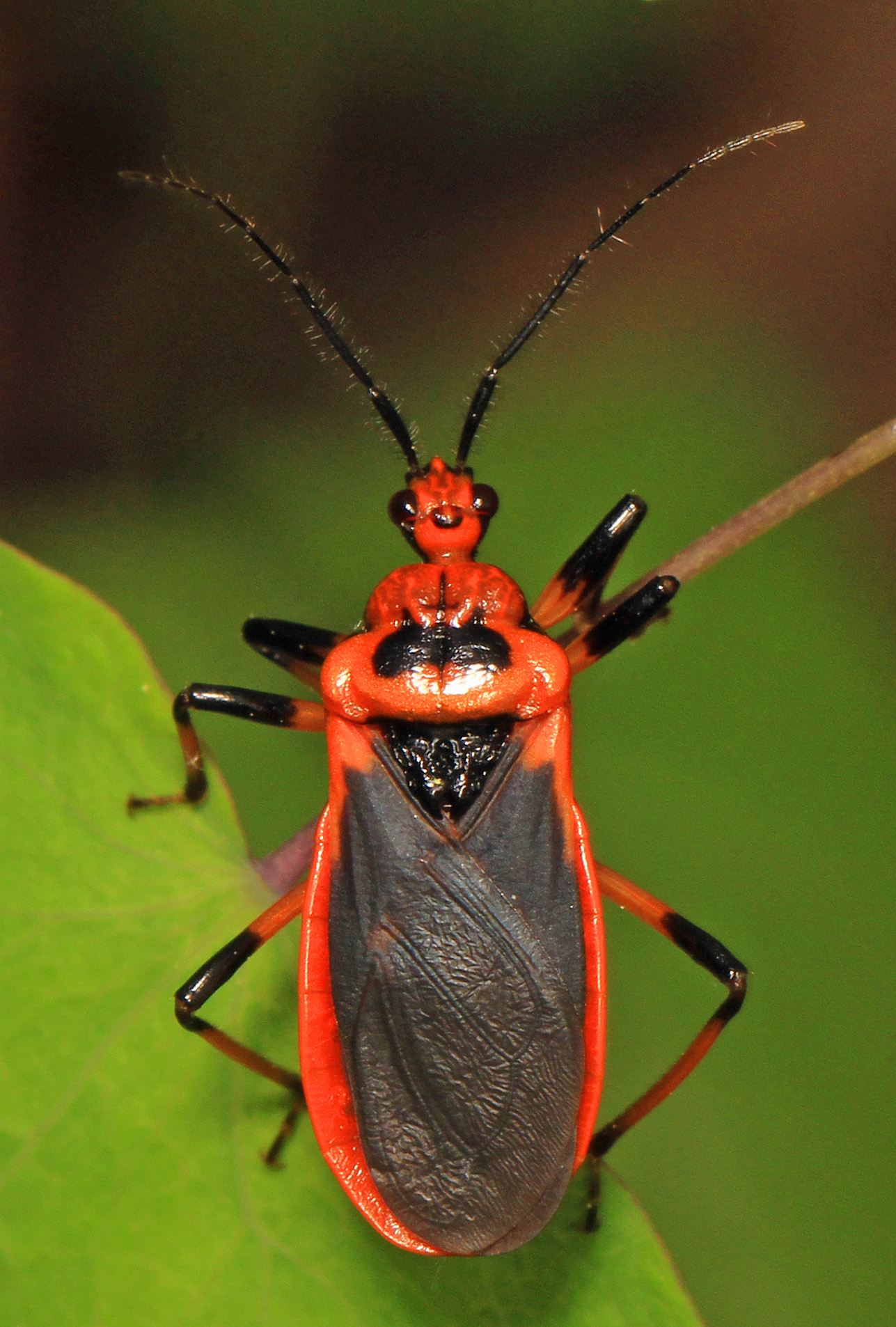
- Rhiginia cruciata

Scientific classification
- Kingdom: Animalia
- Phylum: Arthropoda
- Class: Insecta
- Order: Hemiptera
- Suborder: Heteroptera
- Family: Reduviidae
- Subfamily: Ectrichodiinae
- Genus: Rhiginia; Stål, 1859

= Rhiginia =

Genus of true bugs

Rhiginia is a New World genus in the subfamily Ectrichodiinae of Reduviidae (assassin bugs). Species of this genus are generally active, alert and strong fliers.

== Partial list of species ==
- Rhiginia cinctiventris (Stål, 1872)
- Rhiginia cruciata (Say, 1832)
- Rhiginia lateralis (Lepeletier and Serville, 1825)
