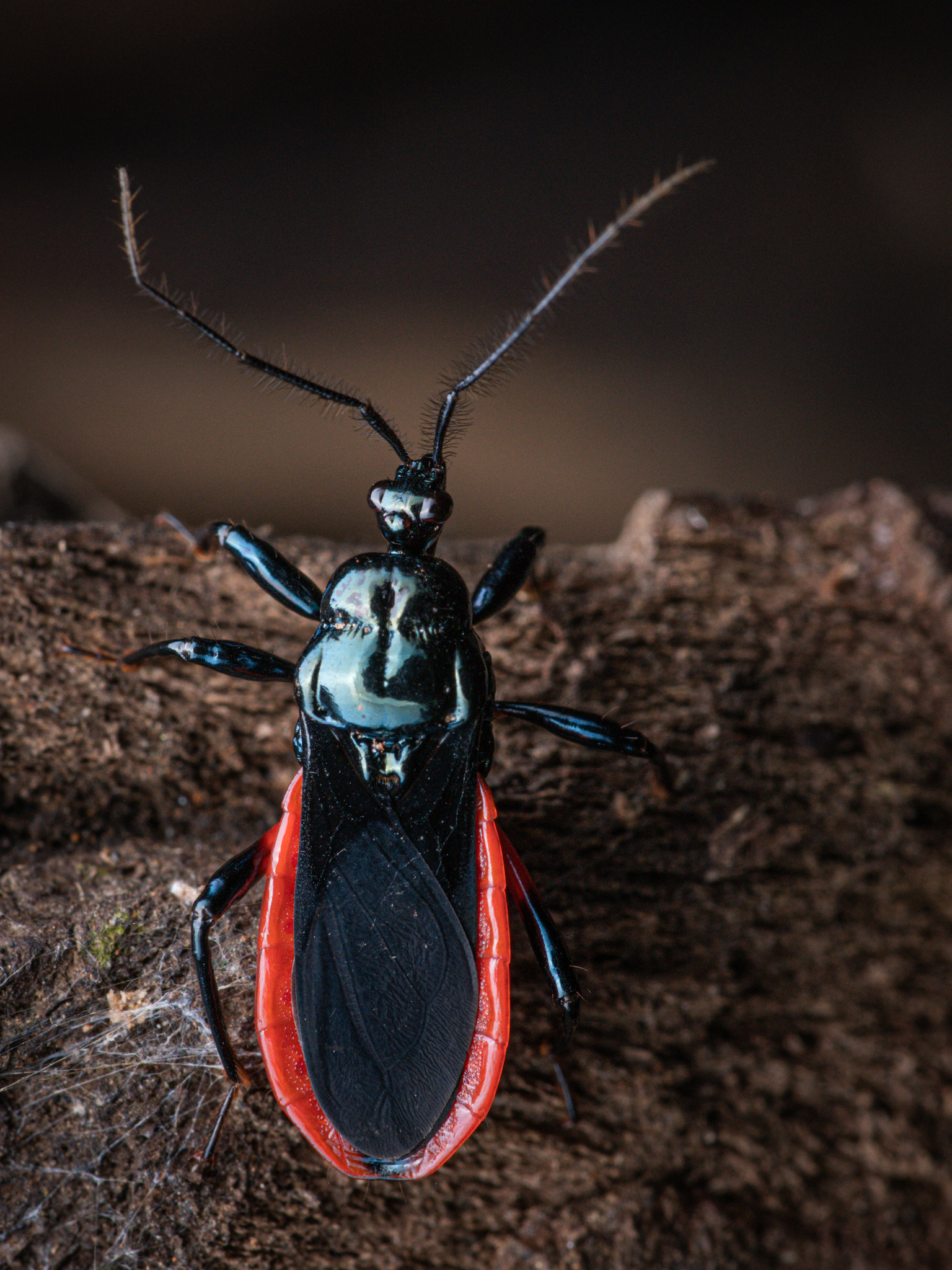
- Ectrychotes callidus

Scientific classification
- Kingdom: Animalia
- Phylum: Arthropoda
- Clade: Pancrustacea
- Class: Insecta
- Order: Hemiptera
- Suborder: Heteroptera
- Family: Reduviidae
- Subfamily: Ectrichodiinae
- Genus: Ectrychotes; Burmeister, 1835

= Ectrychotes =

Genus of true bugs

Ectrychotes is a genus of Asian assassin bugs in the subfamily Ectrichodiinae; it was erected by Hermann Burmeister in 1835. Species have been recorded from India, China, Korea, Japan, parts of western Indochina and Malesia, especially the Philippines.

== Species ==
The Global Biodiversity Information Facility includes:

1. Ectrychotes abbreviatus Reuter, 1881
2. Ectrychotes aenescens Stål, 1874
3. Ectrychotes andersoni (Distant, 1903)
4. Ectrychotes andreae (Thunberg, 1784)
5. Ectrychotes annamensis Miller, 1955
6. Ectrychotes atripennis (Stål, 1866)
7. Ectrychotes atripes Hsiao, 1973
8. Ectrychotes bharathii Murugan & Livingstone, 1989
9. Ectrychotes bidianus Miller, 1941
10. Ectrychotes breviceps Hsiao, 1973
11. Ectrychotes brevipennis Miller, 1941
12. Ectrychotes brooksi Miller, 1941
13. Ectrychotes callidus Miller, 1948
14. Ectrychotes chejudonis Miyamoto & Lee, 1966
15. Ectrychotes coloratus (Mayr, 1865)
16. Ectrychotes comottoi Lethierry, 1883
17. Ectrychotes consimilis (Distant, 1919)
18. Ectrychotes crudelis (Fabricius, 1803)
19. Ectrychotes cupreus Reuter, 1881
20. Ectrychotes dispar Reuter, 1881
21. Ectrychotes festivus Miller, 1954
22. Ectrychotes fruhstorferi Miller, 1955
23. Ectrychotes geniculatus Miller, 1954
24. Ectrychotes gressitti China, 1940
25. Ectrychotes haematogaster (Burmeister, 1834)
26. Ectrychotes hilaris Miller, 1955
27. Ectrychotes histrio Miller, 1955
28. Ectrychotes insignis (Distant, 1904)
29. Ectrychotes jaguayanus Miller, 1941
30. Ectrychotes jakowleffi Horváth, 1892
31. Ectrychotes kanoi Esaki, 1931
32. Ectrychotes kelantanensis Miller, 1948
33. Ectrychotes lingnanensis China, 1940
34. Ectrychotes marginatus Lethierry, 1885
35. Ectrychotes modestus Miller, 1941
36. Ectrychotes nebulosus Miller, 1954
37. Ectrychotes nigripes Lethierry, 1891
38. Ectrychotes philippinus Stål, 1874
39. Ectrychotes picturatus (Distant, 1919)
40. Ectrychotes pilicornis (Fabricius, 1787)
41. Ectrychotes planifrons Miller, 1954
42. Ectrychotes praecox (Breddin, 1903)
43. Ectrychotes praefectus Miller, 1948
44. Ectrychotes praestans Miller, 1955
45. Ectrychotes relatus Paiva, 1919
46. Ectrychotes rubellus Hsiao, 1973
47. Ectrychotes rubrifemur Breddin, 1901
48. Ectrychotes rufescens Distant, 1903
49. Ectrychotes scutellaris (Breddin, 1903)
50. Ectrychotes serdangensis Miller, 1941
51. Ectrychotes simmondsi Miller, 1941
52. Ectrychotes tiomanensis Miller, 1941
53. Ectrychotes tonkinensis Distant, 1919
54. Ectrychotes tsushimae Miller, 1955
55. Ectrychotes venator Miller, 1954
56. Ectrychotes ventralis Hsiao, 1973
57. Ectrychotes violaceus (Hahn, 1830)
58. Ectrychotes vittiger Miller, 1954
