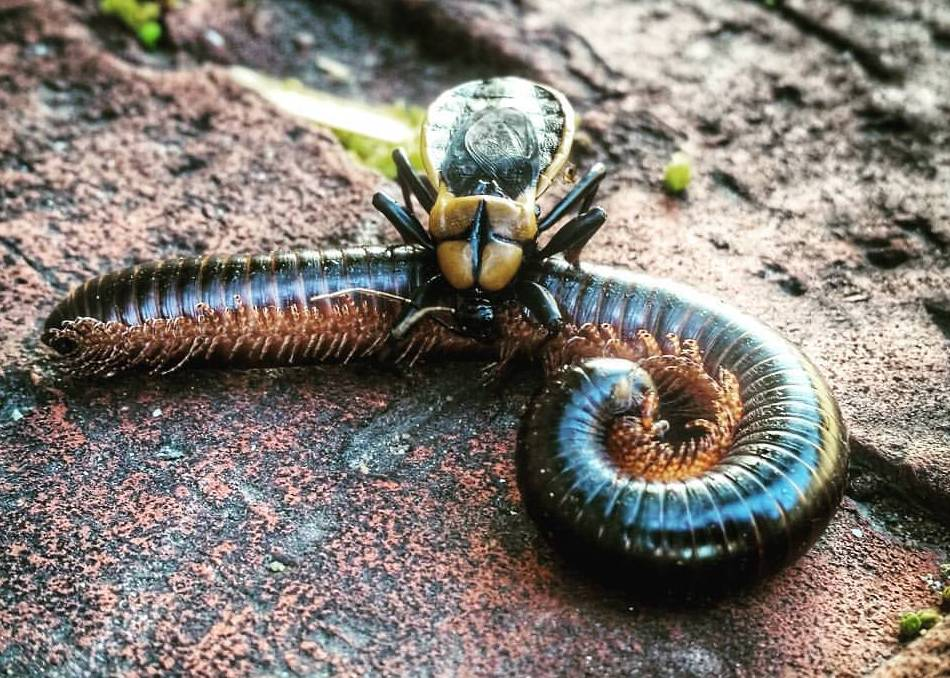
- An unidentified ectrichodine preying on a millipede

Scientific classification
- Kingdom: Animalia
- Phylum: Arthropoda
- Clade: Pancrustacea
- Class: Insecta
- Order: Hemiptera
- Suborder: Heteroptera
- Family: Reduviidae
- Subfamily: Ectrichodiinae; Amyot and Serville, 1843

Tribes
- Abelocephalini Forthman and Weirauch, 2017; Ectrichodiini Amyot and Serville, 1843; Tribelocephalini Stål, 1862; Tribelocodiini Forthman and Weirauch, 2017; Xenocaucini Maldonado, 1996

= Ectrichodiinae =

Subfamily of true bugs

The Ectrichodiinae are a subfamily of assassin bugs (Reduviidae) known for specializing on millipedes as prey. The group comprises more than 600 species in about 115 genera, making it a fairly large subfamily. The bugs are also known for their aposematic coloration, often brightly colored metallic blue, red, or yellow.

Species of this subfamily hide under leaf litter and sometimes boulders and hunt at night.

Females have wing reduction and or/ extreme sexual dimorphism.

== Genera ==
The following genera are recognised in the subfamily Ectrichodiinae:

Tribe Abelocephalini Forthman and Weirauch, 2017

- Abelocephala Maldonado, 1996
- Afrodecius Jeannel, 1919
- Apocaucus Distant, 1909
- Enigmocephala Rédei, 2007
- Gastrogyrus Bergroth, 1921
- Homognetus Bergroth, 1923
- Matangocoris Miller, 1940
- Megapocaucus Miller, 1954

Tribe Ectrichodiini Amyot and Serville, 1843

- Adrania Stål, 1863
- Afrocastra Breddin, 1903
- Antiopula Bergroth, 1863
- Antiopuloides Miller, 1952
- Audernaculus Miller, 1941
- Audernacus Distant, 1904
- Austrokatanga Weirauch, Rabitsch and Rédei, 2009
- Bannania Hsiao, 1973
- Bayerus Distant, 1904
- Bergeviniella Villiers, 1948
- Borgmeierina Wygodzinsky, 1949
- Brisbanocoris Miller, 1957
- Brontostoma Kirkaldy, 1904
- Caecina Stål, 1863
- Caloundranius Miller, 1957
- Centraspis Schaum in Peters and Schaum, 1853
- Centropleurocoris Miller, 1955
- Choucoris Cai in Cai, Yan and Chen, 2000
- Cimbus Hahn, 1831
- Cleptria Stål, 1853
- Colastocoris Miller, 1959
- Cricetopareis Breddin, 1903
- Cryptonannus Dougherty, 1995
- Daraxa Stål, 1859
- Distirogaster Horváth, 1914
- Dithectocoris Swanson, 2017
- Ditulocoris Miller, 1955
- Doblepardocoris Dougherty, 1995
- Dystecta Breddin, 1901
- Ectrichodia Lepeletier and Serville, 1825
- Ectrychotes Burmeister, 1835
- Ectrychotoides Miller, 1954
- Gibbosella Chlond, 2010
- Glymmatophora Stål, 1853
- Guionius Distant, 1909
- Haematoloecha Stål, 1874
- Haematorrhophus Stål, 1874
- Hemihaematorrhophus Murugan and Livingstone, 1995
- Hexamerocerus Reuter, 1881
- Idiocleptria Miller, 1956
- Kasaka Schouteden, 1952
- Katanga Schouteden, 1903
- Labidocoris Mayr, 1865
- Lamprogastocoris Miller, 1952
- Leptomendis Breddin, 1903
- Libaviellus Miller, 1941
- Libavius Distant, 1904
- Libyomendis Breddin, 1903
- Luluacoris Villiers, 1972
- Lyramna Breddin, 1900
- Maraenaspis Karsch, 1892
- Margacoris D. J. Carpintero, 1980
- Marojejycoris Forthman, Chlond and Weirauch, 2016
- Mascaregnasa Distant, 1909
- Menbyolidis Villiers, 1948
- Mendis Stål, 1859
- Mendola Breddin, 1900
- Microsanta Breddin, 1903
- Microstemmatodes Putshkov, 1985
- Microstemmella Miller, 1952
- Microstemmidea Miller, 1952
- Mimocleptria Horváth, 1914
- Miomerocerus Karsch, 1892
- Nannocleptria Miller, 1952
- Nebriscoides Miller, 1957
- Nebriscus Bergroth, 1895
- Neobayerus Miller, 1954
- Neohaematorrhophus Ambrose and Livingstone, 1986
- Neolibavius Miller, 1941
- Neosantosia Miller, 1941
- Neoscadra Miller, 1941
- Neoscadroides Miller, 1954
- Neozirta Distant, 1919
- Nularda Stål, 1859
- Okondo Schouteden, 1931
- Paracleptria Miller, 1952
- Paralibavius Paiva, 1919
- Parascadra Miller, 1954
- Paravilius Miller, 1955
- Philodoxus Horváth, 1914
- Pothea Amyot and Serville, 1843
- Preangerocoris Miller, 1954
- Pseudodaraxa D. J. Carpintero, 1980
- Pseudopothea Wygodzinsky, 1951
- Pseudozirta Bérenger and Gil-Santana, 2005
- Pyrodocoris Miller, 1955
- Quercetanus Distant, 1904
- Quinssyana Distant, 1913
- Racelda Signoret, 1863
- Rellimocoris Dougherty, 1982
- Rhiginia Stål, 1859
- Rhysostethus Hsiao, 1973
- Rochonia Distant, 1913
- Santosia Stål, 1858
- Scadra Stål, 1859
- Scadrana Miller, 1954
- Schmitzicoris Villiers, 1976
- Schottus Distant, 1902
- Schuhella Dougherty, 1995
- Sciaphilocoris Miller, 1949
- Sinchocoris Dougherty, 1995
- Sphinctocoris Mayr, 1865
- Synavecoris Villiers, 1968
- Synectrychotes Livingstone and Murugan, 1987
- Tamaonia China, 1940
- Tanindrazanus Forthman, Chlond and Weirauch, 2016
- Tasmanocoris Miller, 1952
- Toliarus Forthman, Chlond and Weirauch, 2016
- Toxopeusiana Miller, 1954
- Toxopus Bergroth, 1905
- Tracasafra Villiers, 1948
- Travassocoris Wygodzinsky, 1947
- Triclepola Villiers, 1948
- Vilius Stål, 1863
- Wygodzinskyocoris Dougherty, 1995
- Xarada D. J. Carpintero, 1980
- Xenorhyncocoris Miller, 1938
- Zirta Stål, 1859
- Zombocoris Miller, 1952

Tribe Tribelocephalini Stål, 1862

- Acanthorhinocoris Miller, 1940
- Centrogastocoris Miller, 1958
- Distantus Villiers, 1943
- Opistoplatys Westwood, 1834
- Plectrophorocoris Miller, 1958
- Redeicephala Davranoglou, 2016
- Tomolus Stål, 1874
- Tribelocephala Stål, 1853

Tribe Tribelocodiini Forthman and Weirauch, 2017

- Ectrichodiella Fracker and Bruner, 1924
- Tribelocodia Weirauch, 2010

Tribe Xenocaucini Maldonado, 1996

- Xenocaucus China and Usinger, 1949
