= Caecina (bug) =

Scientific classification
- Kingdom: Animalia
- Phylum: Arthropoda
- Class: Insecta
- Order: Hemiptera
- Suborder: Heteroptera
- Family: Reduviidae
- Subfamily: Ectrichodiinae
- Genus: Caecina; Stål

Genus of true bugs

Caecina is a genus in the subfamily Ectrichodiinae of Reduviidae (assassin bugs); 16 species have been described, all of them are located in Eastern Asia.

== Species ==
- Caecina cognata Miller, 1955
- Caecina consimilis Miller, 1941
- Caecina intrepida Miller, 1941
- Caecina javana (Breddin, 1903)
- Caecina javanica Maldonado, 1948
- Caecina montana Miller, 1953
- Caecina nubila Miller, 1954
- Caecina sinica Cui, 2008
- Caecina spinulosa Stål, 1863
- Caecina sumatrensis Miller, 1941
- Caecina venatrix Miller, 1948
- Caecina venosa Miller, 1954
- Caecina walshae Miller, 1958
