= List of Valenzuela species =

This is a list of 308 species in Valenzuela, a genus of lizard barklice in the family Caeciliusidae.

== Valenzuela species ==
- Valenzuela abiectus (Costa, 1885)^{c g}
- Valenzuela adrianae (Mockford, 1991)^{c g}
- Valenzuela albiceps (Pearman, J. V., 1934)^{c g}
- Valenzuela albimaculatus (Badonnel, 1967)^{c g}
- Valenzuela albipes (Thornton, 1984)^{c g}
- Valenzuela albofasciatus (Mockford, 1991)^{c g}
- Valenzuela albomarginatus (Enderlein, 1910)^{c g}
- Valenzuela albus (Badonnel, 1987)^{c g}
- Valenzuela alcinus (Banks, N., 1941)^{c g}
- Valenzuela alticola (Vaughan, Thornton & New, 1991)^{c g}
- Valenzuela ambiguus (Pearman, J. V., 1932)^{c g}
- Valenzuela amicus (Kolbe, 1885)^{c g}
- Valenzuela andeanus (New & Thornton, 1975)^{c g}
- Valenzuela andinus (Cole, New & Thornton, 1989)^{c g}
- Valenzuela angustiplumalus (Li, Fasheng, 1995)^{c g}
- Valenzuela ankaratrensis (Badonnel, 1967)^{c g}
- Valenzuela annulicornis (Enderlein, 1903)^{c g}
- Valenzuela anomalus (Badonnel, 1959)^{c g}
- Valenzuela apicatus (Thornton, S. S. Lee & Chui, 1972)^{c g}
- Valenzuela aridus (Hagen, 1858)^{c g}
- Valenzuela astovensis (New, 1977)^{c g}
- Valenzuela atricornis (McLachlan, 1869)^{i c g}
- Valenzuela badiostigma (Okamoto, 1910)^{c g}
- Valenzuela baishanzuicus (Li, Fasheng, 1995)^{c g}
- Valenzuela baliensis (Thornton, 1984)^{c g}
- Valenzuela bambusae (Soehardjan & Hamann, 1959)^{c g}
- Valenzuela bataviensis (Enderlein, 1926)^{c g}
- Valenzuela bengalensis (Badonnel, 1981)^{c g}
- Valenzuela bermudensis (Mockford, 1989)^{c g}
- Valenzuela bicolorinervus (Li, Fasheng, 1993)^{c g}
- Valenzuela bicoloripes (Badonnel, 1969)^{c g}
- Valenzuela bicolorus (Li, Fasheng, 1993)^{c g}
- Valenzuela bifoliolatus (Li, Fasheng, 1993)^{c g}
- Valenzuela biminiensis (Mockford, 1969)^{c g}
- Valenzuela boggianii (Ribaga, 1908)^{c g}
- Valenzuela bombensis (Baz, 1990)^{c g}
- Valenzuela boreus (Mockford, 1965)^{i c g b}
- Valenzuela borneensis (Karny, H. H., 1925)^{c g}
- Valenzuela brunneimaculatus (Li, Fasheng, 1993)^{c g}
- Valenzuela brunneoflavus (Badonnel, 1935)^{c g}
- Valenzuela brunneonitens (Pearman, J. V., 1932)^{c g}
- Valenzuela burmeisteri (Brauer, 1876)^{i c g}
- Valenzuela cabrerai (Navas, 1920)^{c g}
- Valenzuela caligonoides (Mockford, 1969)^{c g}
- Valenzuela caligonus (Banks, N., 1941)^{c g}
- Valenzuela caloclypeus (Mockford and Gurney, 1956)^{i c g}
- Valenzuela canei (Williner, 1944)^{c g}
- Valenzuela capelli (Navás, 1914)^{c g}
- Valenzuela caribensis (Mockford, 1969)^{c g}
- Valenzuela carneangularis (Li, Fasheng, 1997)^{c g}
- Valenzuela carrilloi (New & Thornton, 1981)^{c g}
- Valenzuela castellus (Banks, N., 1916)^{c g}
- Valenzuela chilozonus (Li, Fasheng, 1995)^{c g}
- Valenzuela chrysopterus (Li, Fasheng, 1997)^{c g}
- Valenzuela cinalus (New & Thornton, 1975)^{c g}
- Valenzuela cincticornis (Banks, N., 1920)^{c g}
- Valenzuela citrinus (Li, Fasheng, 1995)^{c g}
- Valenzuela claripennis (Mockford, 1991)^{c g}
- Valenzuela claristigma (New & Thornton, 1975)^{c g}
- Valenzuela clarivenus (Vaughan, Thornton & New, 1991)^{c g}
- Valenzuela clayae (New & Thornton, 1975)^{c g}
- Valenzuela coei (New, 1973)^{c g}
- Valenzuela collarti (Badonnel, 1946)^{c g}
- Valenzuela columbianus (Badonnel, 1986)^{c g}
- Valenzuela complexus (Turner, B. D., 1975)^{c g}
- Valenzuela confluens (Walsh, 1863)^{i c g b}
- Valenzuela conspicuus (Banks, N., 1937)^{c g}
- Valenzuela cornutus (Navás, 1915)^{c g}
- Valenzuela corsicus (Kolbe, 1882)^{c g}
- Valenzuela croesus (Chapman, 1930)^{i c g b}
- Valenzuela cuboideus (Li, Fasheng, 1995)^{c g}
- Valenzuela cuspidatus (Li, Fasheng, 1997)^{c g}
- Valenzuela cyrtospilus (Li, Fasheng, 1999)^{c g}
- Valenzuela dayongicus (Li, Fasheng, 1992)^{c g}
- Valenzuela debilis (Pictet-Baraban & Hagen, 1856)^{c g}
- Valenzuela deceptor (Banks, N., 1920)^{c g}
- Valenzuela delamarei (Badonnel, 1949)^{c g}
- Valenzuela delicatulus (Li, Fasheng, 1992)^{c g}
- Valenzuela descolei (Williner, 1944)^{c g}
- Valenzuela despaxi (Badonnel, 1936)^{c g}
- Valenzuela dicornis (Li, Fasheng, 1997)^{c g}
- Valenzuela dificilis (Mockford, 1969)^{c g}
- Valenzuela dinghuensis (New, 1991)^{c g}
- Valenzuela diploideus (Li, Fasheng, 1999)^{c g}
- Valenzuela distinctus (Mockford, 1966)^{i c g}
- Valenzuela dives (Navas, 1927)^{c g}
- Valenzuela dolichostigmus (Li, Fasheng, 1992)^{c g}
- Valenzuela dubius (Badonnel, 1946)^{c g}
- Valenzuela eastopi (New & Thornton, 1975)^{c g}
- Valenzuela elegans (Mockford, 1969)^{c g}
- Valenzuela elegantoides (Mockford, 1969)^{c g}
- Valenzuela equivocatus (Mockford, 1969)^{c g}
- Valenzuela erythrostigma (Li, Fasheng, 1993)^{c}
- Valenzuela erythrostigmus Li, Fasheng, 2002^{c g}
- Valenzuela erythrozonalis (Li, Fasheng, 1993)^{c g}
- Valenzuela estriatus (Li, Fasheng, 1997)^{c g}
- Valenzuela excavatus (Li, Fasheng, 1993)^{c g}
- Valenzuela farrelli (Cole, New & Thornton, 1989)^{c g}
- Valenzuela fasciatus (Enderlein, 1906)^{c g}
- Valenzuela fasciipennis (Mockford, 1969)^{c g}
- Valenzuela flavibrunneus (Mockford, 1969)^{c g}
- Valenzuela flavidorsalis (Okamoto, 1910)^{c g}
- Valenzuela flavidus (Stephens, 1836)^{i c g b}
- Valenzuela flavipennis (Costa, 1885)^{c g}
- Valenzuela flavistigma (Tillyard, 1923)^{c g}
- Valenzuela flavus (Smithers, Courtenay, 1969)^{c g}
- Valenzuela florinaevus (Li, Fasheng, 1999)^{c g}
- Valenzuela foramilulosus (Li, Fasheng, 1995)^{c g}
- Valenzuela fortis (Li, Fasheng, 1995)^{c g}
- Valenzuela fortunatus (Enderlein, 1929)^{c g}
- Valenzuela fraternus (Banks, N., 1937)^{c g}
- Valenzuela fuligineneurus (Li, Fasheng, 1997)^{c g}
- Valenzuela furculatus (Navás, 1934)^{c g}
- Valenzuela fuscipennis (Thornton, S. S. Lee & Chui, 1972)^{c g}
- Valenzuela fuscolineus (Turner, B. D. & Cheke, 1983)^{c g}
- Valenzuela fusicangularis (Li, Fasheng, 1995)^{c g}
- Valenzuela gelaberti (Navás, 1914)^{c g}
- Valenzuela gemmatus (Mockford, 1991)^{c g}
- Valenzuela ghesquierei (Badonnel, 1946)^{c g}
- Valenzuela gonostigma (Enderlein, 1906)^{i c g b}
- Valenzuela gracilentus (Li, Fasheng, 1997)^{c g}
- Valenzuela gracilis (Okamoto, 1910)^{c g}
- Valenzuela graminis (Mockford, 1966)^{i c g}
- Valenzuela grandivalvus (Li, Fasheng, 1999)^{c g}
- Valenzuela granulosus (Badonnel, 1967)^{c g}
- Valenzuela gutianshanicus (Li, Fasheng, 1995)^{c g}
- Valenzuela gynapterus (Tetens, 1891)^{c g}
- Valenzuela hainanensis (New, 1991)^{c g}
- Valenzuela hemipsocoides (Badonnel, 1935)^{c g}
- Valenzuela heptimacularus (Li, Fasheng, 1999)^{c g}
- Valenzuela himalayanus (Enderlein, 1903)^{c g}
- Valenzuela hivesi (Cole, New & Thornton, 1989)^{c g}
- Valenzuela huangi (Li, Fasheng, 1999)^{c g}
- Valenzuela hubeiensis (Li, Fasheng, 1997)^{c g}
- Valenzuela hyperboreus (Mockford, 1965)^{i c g b}
- Valenzuela ilamensis (New, 1983)^{c g}
- Valenzuela imbecillus (McLachlan, 1866)^{c g}
- Valenzuela imitator (Badonnel, 1969)^{c g}
- Valenzuela impressus (Hagen, 1859)^{c g}
- Valenzuela incoloratus (Mockford, 1969)^{i c g}
- Valenzuela incurviusculus (Li, Fasheng, 1995)^{c g}
- Valenzuela indicator (Mockford, 1969)^{i c g b}
- Valenzuela indicus (Navás, 1934)^{c g}
- Valenzuela inornatus (Mockford, 1996)^{c g}
- Valenzuela inquinatus (Enderlein, 1902)^{c g}
- Valenzuela insidiosus (Badonnel, 1967)^{c g}
- Valenzuela isochasialis (Li, Fasheng, 1995)^{c g}
- Valenzuela itremoensis (Badonnel, 1976)^{c g}
- Valenzuela jamaicensis (Banks, N., 1938)^{c g}
- Valenzuela javanus (Enderlein, 1907)^{c g}
- Valenzuela juniperorum (Mockford, 1969)^{i c g}
- Valenzuela kamakurensis (Okamoto, 1910)^{c g}
- Valenzuela kamatembanus (Badonnel, 1959)^{c g}
- Valenzuela kansuensis (Enderlein, 1934)^{c g}
- Valenzuela klebsi (Enderlein, 1911)^{c g}
- Valenzuela kraussi (Thornton, S. S. Lee & Chui, 1972)^{c g}
- Valenzuela kunashirensis Mockford, 2003^{c g}
- Valenzuela labinae Lienhard, 2006^{c g}
- Valenzuela labratus (Navás, 1934)^{c g}
- Valenzuela labrostylus Lienhard, 2002^{c g}
- Valenzuela lachloosae ^{b}
- Valenzuela lemniscellus (Enderlein, 1907)^{c g}
- Valenzuela leuroceps (Thornton, S. S. Lee & Chui, 1972)^{c g}
- Valenzuela lochloosae (Mockford, 1965)^{i c g}
- Valenzuela longistylus (Badonnel, 1935)^{c g}
- Valenzuela longulus (Navás, 1932)^{c g}
- Valenzuela luachimensis (Badonnel, 1955)^{c g}
- Valenzuela luridus (Enderlein, 1903)^{c g}
- Valenzuela luteovenosus (Okamoto, 1910)^{c g}
- Valenzuela machadoi (Badonnel, 1955)^{c g}
- Valenzuela macromelaus (Li, Fasheng, 1993)^{c g}
- Valenzuela maculistigma (Enderlein, 1903)^{c g}
- Valenzuela magnioculus (Li, Fasheng, 1991)^{c g}
- Valenzuela manteri (Sommerman, 1943)^{i c g b}
- Valenzuela manteri (Sommerman, 1943)^{i c g b}
- Valenzuela marginalis (Badonnel, 1955)^{c g}
- Valenzuela marginatus (Thornton, S. S. Lee & Chui, 1972)^{c g}
- Valenzuela marginilacutus (Li, Fasheng, 1999)^{c g}
- Valenzuela maritimus (Mockford, 1965)^{i c g}
- Valenzuela mclareni (Cole, New & Thornton, 1989)^{c g}
- Valenzuela medialunatus (Vaughan, Thornton & New, 1991)^{c g}
- Valenzuela medimacularis (Li, Fasheng, 1997)^{c g}
- Valenzuela megalocystis (Li, Fasheng, 1995)^{c g}
- Valenzuela megalodichotomus (Li, Fasheng, 1997)^{c g}
- Valenzuela melanocnemis (Enderlein, 1907)^{c g}
- Valenzuela metasequoiae (Li, Fasheng, 1997)^{c g}
- Valenzuela mexcalensis (Mockford, 1965)^{c g}
- Valenzuela mexicanus (Enderlein, 1909)^{c g}
- Valenzuela micanopi (Mockford, 1965)^{i c g b}
- Valenzuela micans (New & Thornton, 1975)^{c g}
- Valenzuela microcystus (Li, Fasheng, 1995)^{c g}
- Valenzuela milloti (Badonnel, 1967)^{c g}
- Valenzuela minutoculus (Li, Fasheng, 1991)^{c g}
- Valenzuela miocensis (Baz, 1990)^{c g}
- Valenzuela mjoebergi (Karny, H. H., 1925)^{c g}
- Valenzuela mockfordi (Turner, B. D., 1975)^{c g}
- Valenzuela mueggenbergi (Enderlein, 1903)^{g}
- Valenzuela mueggenburgi (Enderlein, 1903)^{c g}
- Valenzuela multimaculatus (Li, Fasheng, 1991)^{c g}
- Valenzuela myrmicaformis (Turner, B. D., 1975)^{c g}
- Valenzuela nadleri (Mockford, 1966)^{i c g b}
- Valenzuela nebuloides Mockford, 2000^{c g}
- Valenzuela nebulomaculatus Mockford, 2000^{c g}
- Valenzuela nebulosoides Mockford, 2000^{c g}
- Valenzuela nebulosus (Navás, 1909)^{c g}
- Valenzuela nigricornis (Okamoto, 1910)^{c g}
- Valenzuela nigritibia (Yoshizawa, 1997)^{c g}
- Valenzuela nigroticta (Williner, 1945)^{c g}
- Valenzuela obliquus (Li, Fasheng, 1992)^{c g}
- Valenzuela obscuripennis (Mockford, 1991)^{c g}
- Valenzuela obscurus (Pearman, J. V., 1932)^{c g}
- Valenzuela ochroleucus (Li, Fasheng, 1993)^{c g}
- Valenzuela oculatus (Kolbe, 1884)^{c g}
- Valenzuela okamotoi (Banks, N., 1937)^{c g}
- Valenzuela olitorius (Banks, N., 1941)^{c g}
- Valenzuela oyamai (Enderlein, 1906)^{c g}
- Valenzuela pakistanensis (Badonnel, 1981)^{c g}
- Valenzuela pallidobrunneus (Mockford, 1969)^{c g}
- Valenzuela paradistinctus (New & Thornton, 1975)^{c g}
- Valenzuela paraguayensis (Enderlein, 1910)^{c g}
- Valenzuela paramonus (Badonnel, 1986)^{c g}
- Valenzuela parbatensis (New, 1983)^{c g}
- Valenzuela patellaris (Li, Fasheng, 1992)^{c g}
- Valenzuela pauliani (Badonnel, 1967)^{c g}
- Valenzuela pectinatus (Badonnel, 1955)^{c g}
- Valenzuela pelmus (New & Thornton, 1976)^{c g}
- Valenzuela perplexus (Chapman, 1930)^{i c g b}
- Valenzuela peyrierasi (Badonnel, 1976)^{c g}
- Valenzuela phaeocephalus (Li, Fasheng, 1995)^{c g}
- Valenzuela phaeopterellus Mockford, 2003^{c g}
- Valenzuela phaeopterus (Li, Fasheng, 1997)^{c g}
- Valenzuela phaeozanalis (Li, Fasheng, 1995)^{c g}
- Valenzuela piceus (Kolbe, 1882)^{c g}
- Valenzuela pinicola (Banks, 1903)^{i c g b}
- Valenzuela plagioerythrinus (Li, Fasheng, 1993)^{c g}
- Valenzuela platytaenius (Li, Fasheng, 1995)^{c g}
- Valenzuela podacromelas (Enderlein, 1908)^{c g}
- Valenzuela podacrophaeus (Enderlein, 1909)^{c g}
- Valenzuela posticoides (Mockford, 1991)^{c g}
- Valenzuela posticus (Banks, 1914)^{i c g b}
- Valenzuela proavus (Pictet-Baraban & Hagen, 1856)^{c g}
- Valenzuela prometheus (Enderlein, 1911)^{c g}
- Valenzuela protritus (Enderlein, 1931)^{c g}
- Valenzuela pseudanalis (Thornton, S. S. Lee & Chui, 1972)^{c g}
- Valenzuela pteridii (Smithers, Courtenay, 1977)^{c g}
- Valenzuela pubes (Enderlein, 1903)^{c g}
- Valenzuela pugioniformis (Li, Fasheng, 1995)^{c g}
- Valenzuela pulchellus (Mockford, 1974)^{c g}
- Valenzuela purpureus (Li, Fasheng, 1993)^{c g}
- Valenzuela pycnacanthus (Li, Fasheng, 1997)^{c g}
- Valenzuela quadrimaculatus (Li, Fasheng, 1993)^{c g}
- Valenzuela quaternatus (Li, Fasheng, 1993)^{c g}
- Valenzuela quinarius (Li, Fasheng, 1993)^{c g}
- Valenzuela rodriguezi (Williner, 1944)^{c g}
- Valenzuela roseus (New, 1971)^{c g}
- Valenzuela rosor (Navás, 1930)^{c g}
- Valenzuela rubinii (Vaughan, Thornton & New, 1991)^{c g}
- Valenzuela rubiventer (Thornton, 1984)^{c g}
- Valenzuela sanchezlabradori (Williner, 1949)^{c g}
- Valenzuela scenepipedus (Enderlein, 1911)^{c g}
- Valenzuela scriptus (Enderlein, 1906)^{c g}
- Valenzuela serpentinus (Enderlein, 1926)^{c g}
- Valenzuela shixingensis (Li, Fasheng, 1993)^{c g}
- Valenzuela signatipennis (Enderlein, 1907)^{c g}
- Valenzuela similipennis (Badonnel, 1967)^{c g}
- Valenzuela similis (Badonnel, 1949)^{c g}
- Valenzuela simplex (Navás, 1930)^{c g}
- Valenzuela singularis (Smithers, Courtenay, 1995)^{c g}
- Valenzuela sinuofasciatus (Badonnel, 1935)^{c g}
- Valenzuela soleili (Badonnel, 1946)^{c g}
- Valenzuela spiloerythrinus (Li, Fasheng, 1993)^{c g}
- Valenzuela spissicornis (Badonnel, 1943)^{c g}
- Valenzuela stenopterus (Li, Fasheng, 1993)^{c g}
- Valenzuela stigmatus (Okamoto, 1910)^{c g}
- Valenzuela striolatus (Li, Fasheng, 1995)^{c g}
- Valenzuela stuckenbergi (Badonnel, 1967)^{c g}
- Valenzuela subelegans (Mockford, 1969)^{c g}
- Valenzuela subflavus (Aaron, 1886)^{i c g b}
- Valenzuela sublineatus Mockford, 2000^{c g}
- Valenzuela subnebulosus Mockford, 2000^{c g}
- Valenzuela subundulatus (Li, Fasheng, 1995)^{c g}
- Valenzuela sucinicaptus (Enderlein, 1911)^{c g}
- Valenzuela suffusus (Navás, 1931)^{c g}
- Valenzuela sulciformis (Li, Fasheng, 1992)^{c g}
- Valenzuela tamiami (Mockford, 1965)^{i c g}
- Valenzuela thiemei (Enderlein, 1903)^{c g}
- Valenzuela totonacus (Mockford, 1966)^{i c g}
- Valenzuela traceus (Thornton, 1984)^{c g}
- Valenzuela trifolius (Li, Fasheng, 1999)^{c g}
- Valenzuela trigonostigma (Enderlein, 1907)^{c g}
- Valenzuela trigonus (Li, Fasheng, 1997)^{c g}
- Valenzuela trimaculatus (Li, Fasheng, 1992)^{c g}
- Valenzuela trukensis (Thornton, S. S. Lee & Chui, 1972)^{c g}
- Valenzuela tuberculatus (New & Thornton, 1975)^{c g}
- Valenzuela umbratus (Navas, 1922)^{c g}
- Valenzuela umbripennis (Navás, 1932)^{c g}
- Valenzuela vau (Enderlein, 1931)^{c g}
- Valenzuela velectus (Thornton, 1984)^{c g}
- Valenzuela veracruzensis (Mockford, 1969)^{c g}
- Valenzuela villiersi (Badonnel, 1943)^{c g}
- Valenzuela virgatus (Broadhead & Alison Richards, 1982)^{c g}
- Valenzuela vitellinus (Li, Fasheng, 1993)^{c g}
- Valenzuela vittidorsum (Enderlein, 1907)^{c g}
- Valenzuela wolffhuegelianus (Enderlein, 1906)^{c g}
- Valenzuela wui (Li, Fasheng, 1995)^{c g}
- Valenzuela wuxiaensis (Li, Fasheng, 1997)^{c g}
- Valenzuela wuyishanicus (Li, Fasheng, 1999)^{c g}
- Valenzuela zhejiangicus (Li, Fasheng, 1995)^{c g}

Data sources: i = ITIS, c = Catalogue of Life, g = GBIF, b = Bugguide.net

Of the Valenzuela species currently listed, only those authored by Longinos Navás were subject to critical revision by Meinander (1979) and subsequently treated as synonyms or misidentifications in the world catalogue of Lienhard & Smithers (2002). The majority of Valenzuela species, described by later authors using modern diagnostic characters, remain valid.
