= Valenzuela perplexus =

Scientific classification
- Domain: Eukaryota
- Kingdom: Animalia
- Phylum: Arthropoda
- Class: Insecta
- Order: Psocodea
- Family: Caeciliusidae
- Subfamily: Caeciliusinae
- Genus: Valenzuela
- Species: V. perplexus

Binomial name
- Valenzuela perplexus (Chapman, 1930)

Species of booklouse

Valenzuela perplexus is a species of lizard barklouse in the family Caeciliusidae. It is found in Central America and North America.
