= Valenzuela elegans =

Scientific classification
- Domain: Eukaryota
- Kingdom: Animalia
- Phylum: Arthropoda
- Class: Insecta
- Order: Psocodea
- Family: Caeciliusidae
- Genus: Valenzuela
- Species: V. elegans

Binomial name
- Valenzuela elegans (Mockford, 1969)

Synonyms
- Caecilius elegans Mockford, 1969

Species of booklouse

Valenzuela elegans is a species of psocoptera in the family Caeciliusidae, the lizard barklice. It is found in Haiti and the Hispaniola island.
