= Reuterella helvimacula =

Scientific classification
- Kingdom: Animalia
- Phylum: Arthropoda
- Clade: Pancrustacea
- Class: Insecta
- Order: Psocodea
- Family: Elipsocidae
- Genus: Reuterella
- Species: R. helvimacula

Binomial name
- Reuterella helvimacula (Enderlein, 1901)

Species of booklouse

Reuterella helvimacula is a species of Psocoptera from Elipsocidae family that can be found in United Kingdom and Ireland. The species are brownish-orange.

== Habitat ==
The species feeds on beech, birch, blackthorn, elm, hawthorn, larch, oak, pine, and sycamore. It also feeds on fruits such as horse chestnut and lime.
