= Maoripsocus africanus =

Scientific classification
- Kingdom: Animalia
- Phylum: Arthropoda
- Class: Insecta
- Order: Psocodea
- Family: Caeciliusidae
- Subfamily: Caeciliusinae
- Genus: Maoripsocus
- Species: M. africanus

Binomial name
- Maoripsocus africanus (Ribaga, 1911)

Species of booklouse

Maoripsocus africanus is a species of lizard barklouse in the family Caeciliusidae. It is found in Africa and North America.
