= Valenzuela gonostigma =

Scientific classification
- Kingdom: Animalia
- Phylum: Arthropoda
- Clade: Pancrustacea
- Class: Insecta
- Order: Psocodea
- Family: Caeciliusidae
- Subfamily: Caeciliusinae
- Genus: Valenzuela
- Species: V. gonostigma

Binomial name
- Valenzuela gonostigma (Enderlein, 1906)

Species of booklouse

Valenzuela gonostigma is a species of lizard barklouse in the family Caeciliusidae. It is found in North America and Southern Asia.
