= Epicaecilius pilipennis =

Scientific classification
- Kingdom: Animalia
- Phylum: Arthropoda
- Clade: Pancrustacea
- Class: Insecta
- Order: Psocodea
- Family: Caeciliusidae
- Genus: Epicaecilius
- Species: E. pilipennis

Binomial name
- Epicaecilius pilipennis (Lienhard, 1996)

Species of booklouse

Epicaecilius pilipennis is a species of Psocoptera from the Caeciliusidae family that can be found in Great Britain and Ireland. The species are yellowish-black.

== Habitat ==
The species feed on ash, beech, conifer, elm, gorse, oak, pine, spruce, and yew. Besides trees, it also likes fruits like horse chestnut.
