= Elipsocus coloripennis =

Scientific classification
- Kingdom: Animalia
- Phylum: Arthropoda
- Clade: Pancrustacea
- Class: Insecta
- Order: Psocodea
- Family: Elipsocidae
- Genus: Elipsocus
- Species: E. coloripennis

Binomial name
- Elipsocus coloripennis Lienhard, 1996

Species of booklouse

Elipsocus coloripennis is a species of psocopteran from the Elipsocidae family. It is endemic to the Canary Islands.
