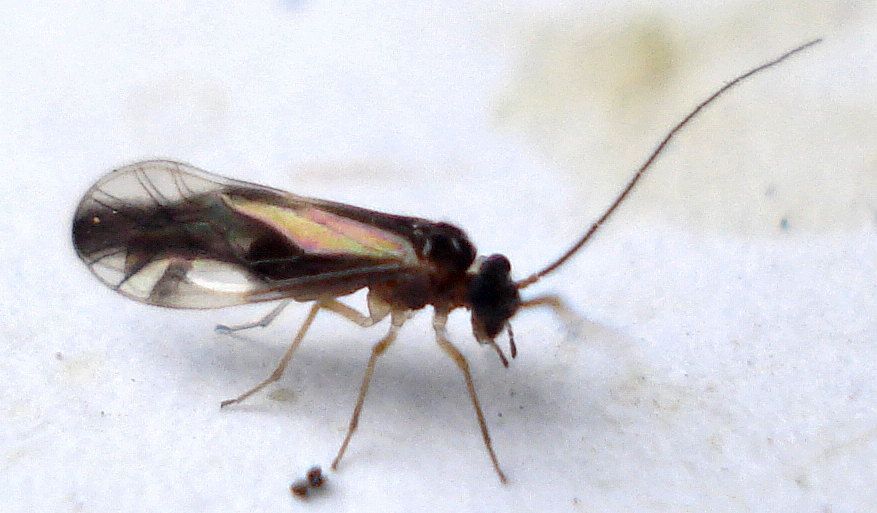

Scientific classification
- Kingdom: Animalia
- Phylum: Arthropoda
- Class: Insecta
- Order: Psocodea
- Family: Caeciliusidae
- Genus: Caecilius
- Species: C. fuscopterus

Binomial name
- Caecilius fuscopterus (Latreille, 1799)

= Caecilius fuscopterus =

Species of booklouse

Caecilius fuscopterus is a species of Psocoptera from the family Caeciliusidae that can be found in Great Britain and Ireland. It also common in countries like Austria, Belgium, Croatia, Denmark, Finland, France, Germany, Hungary, Italy, Latvia, Luxembourg. The species are blackish-orange coloured and are similar to Elipsocus abdominalis

== Habitat ==
The species feed on trees like hawthorns, oaks and sallow. It also feed on plants such as rhododendrons.
