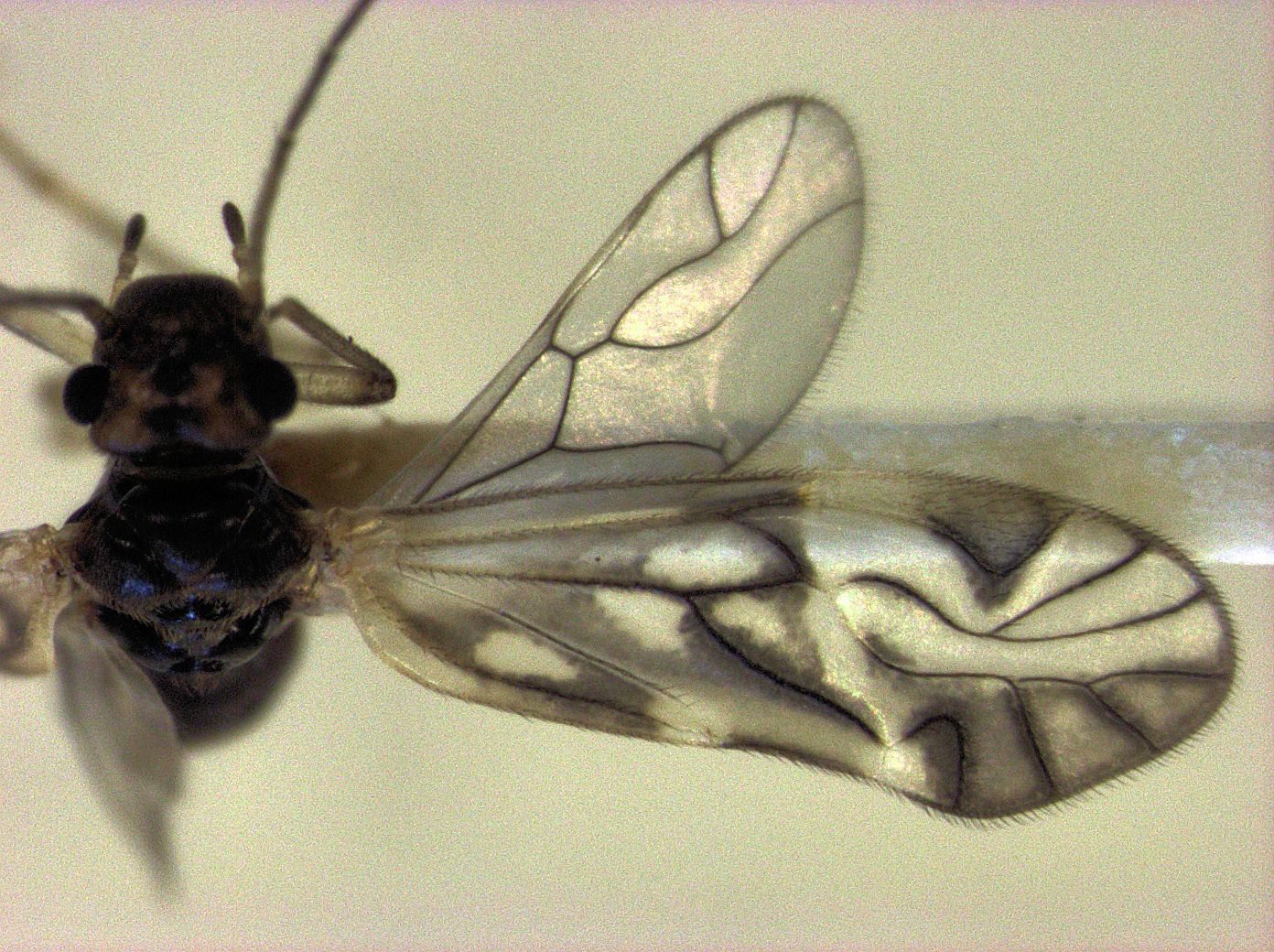

Scientific classification
- Kingdom: Animalia
- Phylum: Arthropoda
- Class: Insecta
- Order: Psocodea
- Family: Caeciliusidae
- Subfamily: Caeciliusinae
- Genus: Maoripsocus; Tillyard, 1923

= Maoripsocus =

Genus of booklice

Maoripsocus is a genus of lizard barklice in the family Caeciliusidae. There are at least 21 described species in Maoripsocus. The genus was first described by Robin Tillyard in 1923.

== Species ==
These 21 species belong to the genus Maoripsocus:

- Maoripsocus aequalis (Broadhead & Alison Richards, 1982)^{c g}
- Maoripsocus africanus (Ribaga, 1911)^{i c g b}
- Maoripsocus concavistigma (Schmidt, E. R. & Thornton, 1993)^{c g}
- Maoripsocus dimorphus (Smithers, Courtenay, 1992)^{c g}
- Maoripsocus ericifoliae (Schmidt, E. R. & Thornton, 1993)^{c g}
- Maoripsocus fastigatus (Smithers, Courtenay, 1969)^{c g}
- Maoripsocus frater (Broadhead & Alison Richards, 1982)^{c g}
- Maoripsocus griseus (Smithers, Courtenay, 1993)^{c g}
- Maoripsocus hobartensis Schmidt, E. R. & New, 2008^{c g}
- Maoripsocus juneae (Schmidt, E. R. & Thornton, 1993)^{c g}
- Maoripsocus koriflae (Arahou, 1984)^{c g}
- Maoripsocus lobatus (Smithers, Courtenay, 1998)^{c g}
- Maoripsocus macrostigma (Enderlein, 1903)^{c g}
- Maoripsocus pedderi Schmidt, E. R. & New, 2008^{c g}
- Maoripsocus semifuscatus Tillyard, 1923^{c g}
- Maoripsocus spiralosus Schmidt, E. R. & New, 2008^{c g}
- Maoripsocus tahunensis Schmidt, E. R. & New, 2008^{c g}
- Maoripsocus tugloensis (Smithers, Courtenay, 1993)^{c g}
- Maoripsocus wedgei Schmidt, E. R. & New, 2008^{c g}
- Maoripsocus weindorferi Schmidt, E. R. & New, 2008^{c g}
- Maoripsocus wilsoni (Schmidt, E. R. & Thornton, 1993)^{c g}

Data sources: i = ITIS, c = Catalogue of Life, g = GBIF, b = Bugguide.net
