= Elipsocus obscurus =

Scientific classification
- Domain: Eukaryota
- Kingdom: Animalia
- Phylum: Arthropoda
- Class: Insecta
- Order: Psocodea
- Family: Elipsocidae
- Genus: Elipsocus
- Species: E. obscurus

Binomial name
- Elipsocus obscurus Mockford, 1980

Species of booklouse

Elipsocus obscurus is a species of damp barklouse in the family Elipsocidae. It is found in Central America and North America.
