= Valenzuela piceus =

Scientific classification
- Kingdom: Animalia
- Phylum: Arthropoda
- Class: Insecta
- Order: Psocodea
- Family: Caeciliusidae
- Genus: Valenzuela
- Species: V. piceus

Binomial name
- Valenzuela piceus (Kolbe, 1882)

Species of booklouse

Valenzuela piceus is a species of Psocoptera in Caeciliusidae family that can be found in the United Kingdom, and sometimes Ireland. It are also common in countries like Austria, Belgium, Bulgaria, Croatia, Denmark, Finland, France, Germany, Greece, Hungary, Italy, Latvia, Luxembourg, Norway, Poland, Romania, Spain, Sweden, Switzerland, and the Netherlands. The species is light brown coloured.

== Habitat ==
The species feeds on haystacks and riverside reeds.
