= Elipsocus azoricus =

Scientific classification
- Domain: Eukaryota
- Kingdom: Animalia
- Phylum: Arthropoda
- Class: Insecta
- Order: Psocodea
- Family: Elipsocidae
- Genus: Elipsocus
- Species: E. azoricus

Binomial name
- Elipsocus azoricus Meinander, 1975

Species of booklouse

Elipsocus pusillus is a species of Psocoptera from the Elipsocidae family that is endemic to Azores.
