= Elipsocus fasciatus =

Scientific classification
- Domain: Eukaryota
- Kingdom: Animalia
- Phylum: Arthropoda
- Class: Insecta
- Order: Psocodea
- Family: Elipsocidae
- Genus: Elipsocus
- Species: E. fasciatus

Binomial name
- Elipsocus fasciatus (Navas, 1908)

Synonyms
- Cabarer fasciatus Navàs, 1908

Species of booklouse

Elipsocus fasciatus is a species of psocopteran from the Elipsocidae family. It is endemic to the Canary Islands.
