= Pseudopsocus rostocki =

Scientific classification
- Kingdom: Animalia
- Phylum: Arthropoda
- Class: Insecta
- Order: Psocodea
- Family: Elipsocidae
- Genus: Pseudopsocus
- Species: P. rostocki

Binomial name
- Pseudopsocus rostocki Kolbe, 1882

Species of booklouse

Pseudopsocus rostocki is a species of Psocoptera from Elipsocidae family that can be found in England and Ireland. It can also be found in Benelux, France, Germany, Poland, Spain, and Sweden. The species are black and white coloured, and are striped. It feeds on lichen-covered conifers.

== Habitat ==
The species feeds on veteran open-grown oaks.
