= Valenzuela atricornis =

Scientific classification
- Domain: Eukaryota
- Kingdom: Animalia
- Phylum: Arthropoda
- Class: Insecta
- Order: Psocodea
- Family: Caeciliusidae
- Genus: Valenzuela
- Species: V. atricornis

Binomial name
- Valenzuela atricornis (McLachlan, 1869)

Species of booklouse

Valenzuela atricornis is a species of Psocoptera from Stenopsocidae family that can be found in United Kingdom and Ireland. They are also common in Austria, Belgium, Croatia, Denmark, Finland, France, Germany, Hungary, Italy, Luxembourg, Norway, Poland, Romania, Sweden, Switzerland, and the Netherlands. The species are yellowish-orange.

== Habitat ==
The species feeds on hawthorn and willow.
