= Stenocaecilius casarum =

Scientific classification
- Domain: Eukaryota
- Kingdom: Animalia
- Phylum: Arthropoda
- Class: Insecta
- Order: Psocodea
- Family: Caeciliusidae
- Genus: Stenocaecilius
- Species: S. casarum

Binomial name
- Stenocaecilius casarum (Badonnel, 1931)

Synonyms
- Caecilius casarum Badonnel, 1931

Species of insect

Stenocaecilius casarum is a species of lizard barklouse in the family Caeciliusidae. It is found in Africa, Australia, the Caribbean, Central America, North America, Oceania, South America, and Southern Asia.
