= Valenzuela corsicus =

Scientific classification
- Domain: Eukaryota
- Kingdom: Animalia
- Phylum: Arthropoda
- Class: Insecta
- Order: Psocodea
- Family: Caeciliusidae
- Genus: Valenzuela
- Species: V. corsicus

Binomial name
- Valenzuela corsicus (Kolbe, 1882)

Species of booklouse

Valenzuela corsicus is a species of Psocoptera from Caeciliusidae family that can be found in Austria, Corsica, Croatia, Cyprus, France, Germany, Greece, Italy, Portugal, Spain, Sweden, Switzerland, and the Netherlands. They also can be found in Near East.
