= Valenzuela despaxi =

Scientific classification
- Domain: Eukaryota
- Kingdom: Animalia
- Phylum: Arthropoda
- Class: Insecta
- Order: Psocodea
- Family: Caeciliusidae
- Genus: Valenzuela
- Species: V. despaxi

Binomial name
- Valenzuela despaxi (Badonnel, 1936)

Species of booklouse

Valenzuela despaxi is a species of Psocoptera from Caeciliusidae family that can be found in Austria, Belgium, Bulgaria, Finland, France, Germany, Hungary, Luxembourg, Norway, Poland, Spain, Sweden, and Switzerland.
