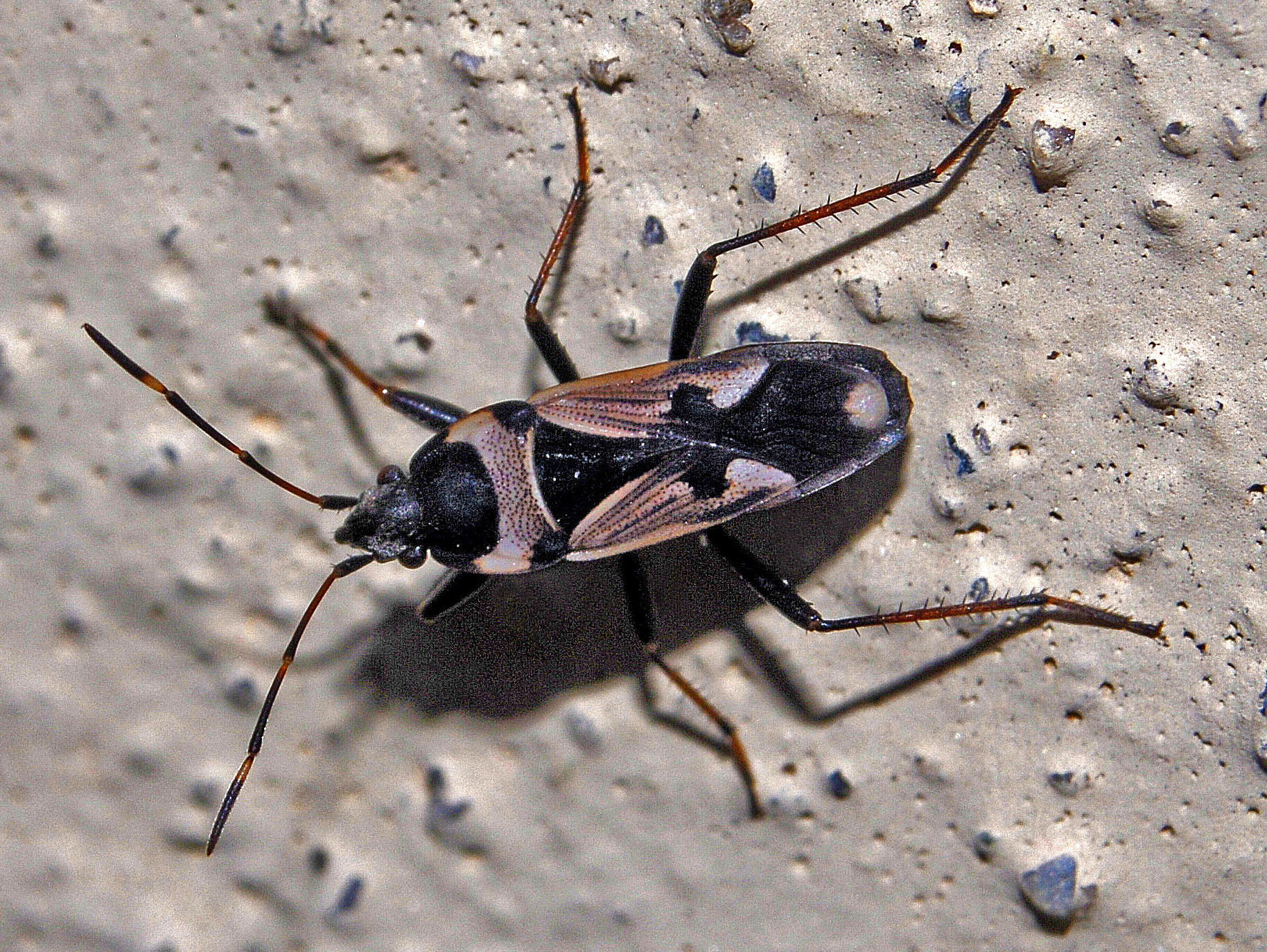
- Raglius confusus. Adult

Scientific classification
- Domain: Eukaryota
- Kingdom: Animalia
- Phylum: Arthropoda
- Class: Insecta
- Order: Hemiptera
- Suborder: Heteroptera
- Family: Rhyparochromidae
- Genus: Raglius
- Species: R. confusus

Binomial name
- Raglius confusus (Reuter, 1886)

Synonyms
- Rhyparochromus confusus (Reuter, 1886); Pachymerus confusus Reuter, 1886

= Raglius confusus =

Species of true bug

Raglius confusus is a species of true bugs belonging to the family Rhyparochromidae.

== Distribution ==
This species is present in most of southern Europe (Albania, Austria, Bulgaria, Croatia, Czech Republic, European Turkey, France, Germany, Greece, Hungary, Italy, North Macedonia, Northwest European Russia, Romania, Slovakia, Slovenia, Spain, Switzerland, Luxembourg and Poland).

== Description ==
Raglius confusus can reach a length of 6.3–8 millimetres (0.25–0.31 in). These small true bugs have distinctive markings of black-on-tan. The head and scutellum are black, while pronotum shows a large black band and a band of stippled brown, with two black spots. Elytra are brown, with two black markings. Membrane is black with a white spot. Hind femora along the lower surface have a row of straight, thin denticles.

== Bibliography ==
- Reuter, O.M. 1886. Rev. Ent., Caen. 5:121
- Reuter, O.M. 1888. Acta. Soc. Sci. fenn. 1, 2 15:(1)241-315; (2)443-812
- Slater, J.A. 1964. A Catalogue of the Lygaeidae of the World. 1317–8; 1461
