= Elipsocus abdominalis =

Scientific classification
- Domain: Eukaryota
- Kingdom: Animalia
- Phylum: Arthropoda
- Class: Insecta
- Order: Psocodea
- Family: Elipsocidae
- Genus: Elipsocus
- Species: E. abdominalis

Binomial name
- Elipsocus abdominalis Reuter, 1904

Synonyms
- Elipsocus hyalinus var. abdominalis Reuter, 1904; Elipsocus mclachlani Kimmins, 1941. Lienhard, 1985; Elipsocus occidentalis Banks, 1907. Mockford, 1980; Elipsocus abdominalis Reuter, 1904. Roesler, 1954

Species of booklouse

Elipsocus abdominalis is a species of Psocoptera from the Elipsocidae family that can be found in Great Britain and Ireland. They are also common in countries like Austria, Benelux, Cyprus, France, Germany, Greece, Hungary, Italy, Poland, Romania, Spain, Switzerland, and Scandinavia. The species are blackish-orange coloured and are similar to Caecilius fuscopterus.

== Habitat ==
The species feed on beech, birch, hawthorn, larch, oak and yew.
