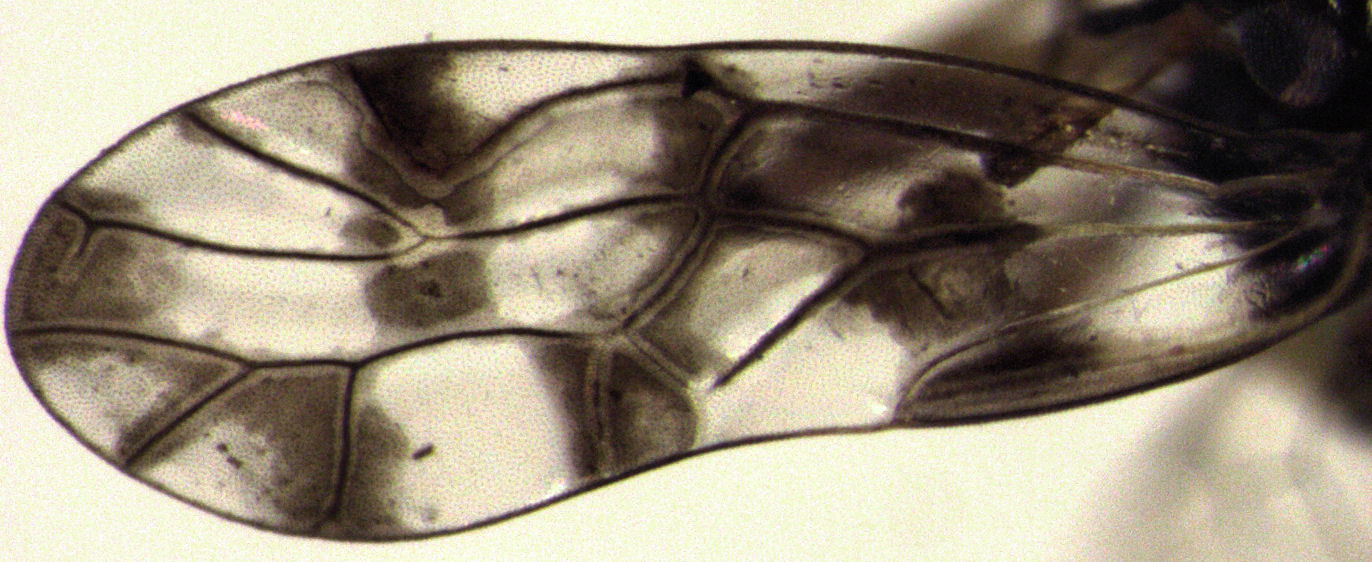
- Propsocus pulchripennis (forewing, length about 2 mm)

Scientific classification
- Domain: Eukaryota
- Kingdom: Animalia
- Phylum: Arthropoda
- Class: Insecta
- Order: Psocodea
- Family: Elipsocidae
- Genus: Propsocus
- Species: P. pulchripennis

Binomial name
- Propsocus pulchripennis (Perkins, 1899)

= Propsocus pulchripennis =

Species of booklouse

Propsocus pulchripennis is a species of damp barklouse in the family Elipsocidae. It is found in Africa, Australia, Europe and Northern Asia (excluding China), Central America, North America, Oceania, and South America.
