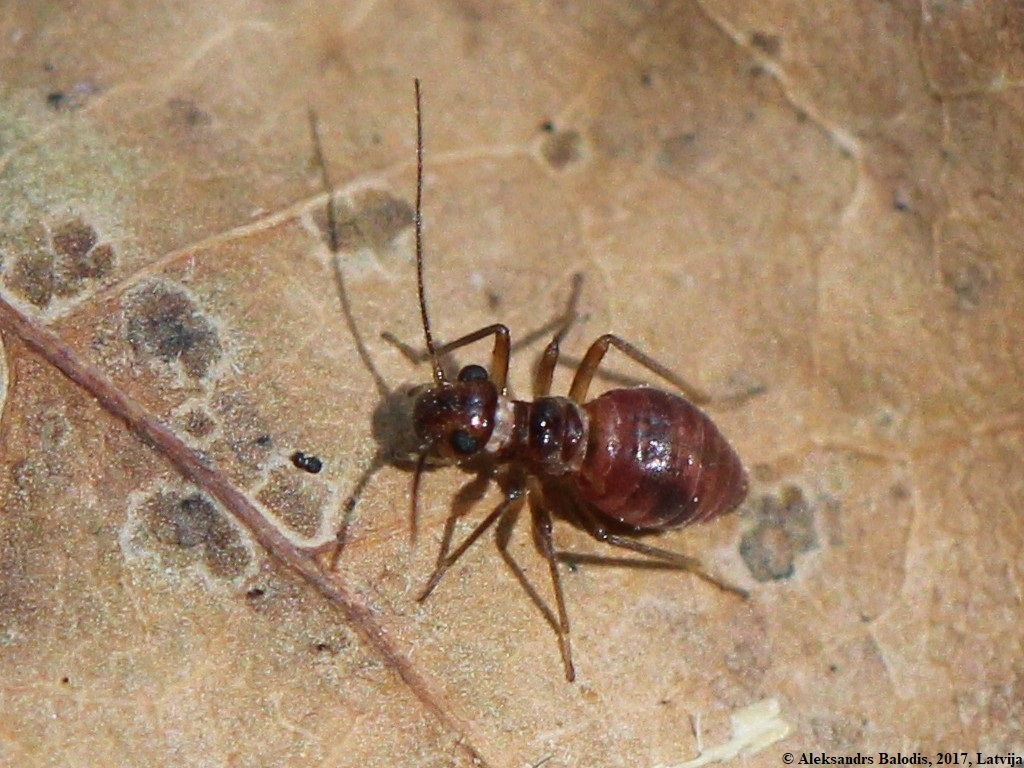

Scientific classification
- Domain: Eukaryota
- Kingdom: Animalia
- Phylum: Arthropoda
- Class: Insecta
- Order: Psocodea
- Family: Caeciliusidae
- Genus: Valenzuela
- Species: V. gynapterus

Binomial name
- Valenzuela gynapterus (Tetens, 1891)

= Valenzuela gynapterus =

Species of booklouse

Valenzuela gynapterus is a species of Psocoptera from Caeciliusidae family that can be found in Finland, France, Germany, Latvia, Luxembourg, Norway, Poland, Romania, Spain, Sweden, Switzerland, and the Netherlands.
