= Elipsocus annulatus =

Scientific classification
- Domain: Eukaryota
- Kingdom: Animalia
- Phylum: Arthropoda
- Class: Insecta
- Order: Psocodea
- Family: Elipsocidae
- Genus: Elipsocus
- Species: E. annulatus

Binomial name
- Elipsocus annulatus Roesler, 1954

Species of booklouse

Elipsocus annulatus is a species of Psocoptera from the Elipsocidae family that can be found in Austria, France, Germany, Italy, Spain, and Switzerland.
