= Pseudopsocus meridionalis =

Scientific classification
- Domain: Eukaryota
- Kingdom: Animalia
- Phylum: Arthropoda
- Class: Insecta
- Order: Psocodea
- Family: Elipsocidae
- Genus: Pseudopsocus
- Species: P. meridionalis

Binomial name
- Pseudopsocus meridionalis (Badonnel, 1936)

Species of booklouse

Pseudopsocus meridionalis is a species of Psocoptera from Elipsocidae family that can be found in Cyprus, France, Germany, Italy, Poland, Spain, and Switzerland.
