= Hemineura =

Hemineura may refer to:

- Hemineura (insect), a genus of insects in the family Elipsocidae
- Hemineura (alga), a genus of algae in the family Delessiaceae
