= Valenzuela manteri =

Scientific classification
- Domain: Eukaryota
- Kingdom: Animalia
- Phylum: Arthropoda
- Class: Insecta
- Order: Psocodea
- Family: Caeciliusidae
- Genus: Valenzuela
- Species: V. manteri

Binomial name
- Valenzuela manteri (Sommerman, 1943)

Species of lizard barklouse in the family Caeciliusidae

Valenzuela manteri is a species of lizard barklouse in the family Caeciliusidae. It is found in North America.
