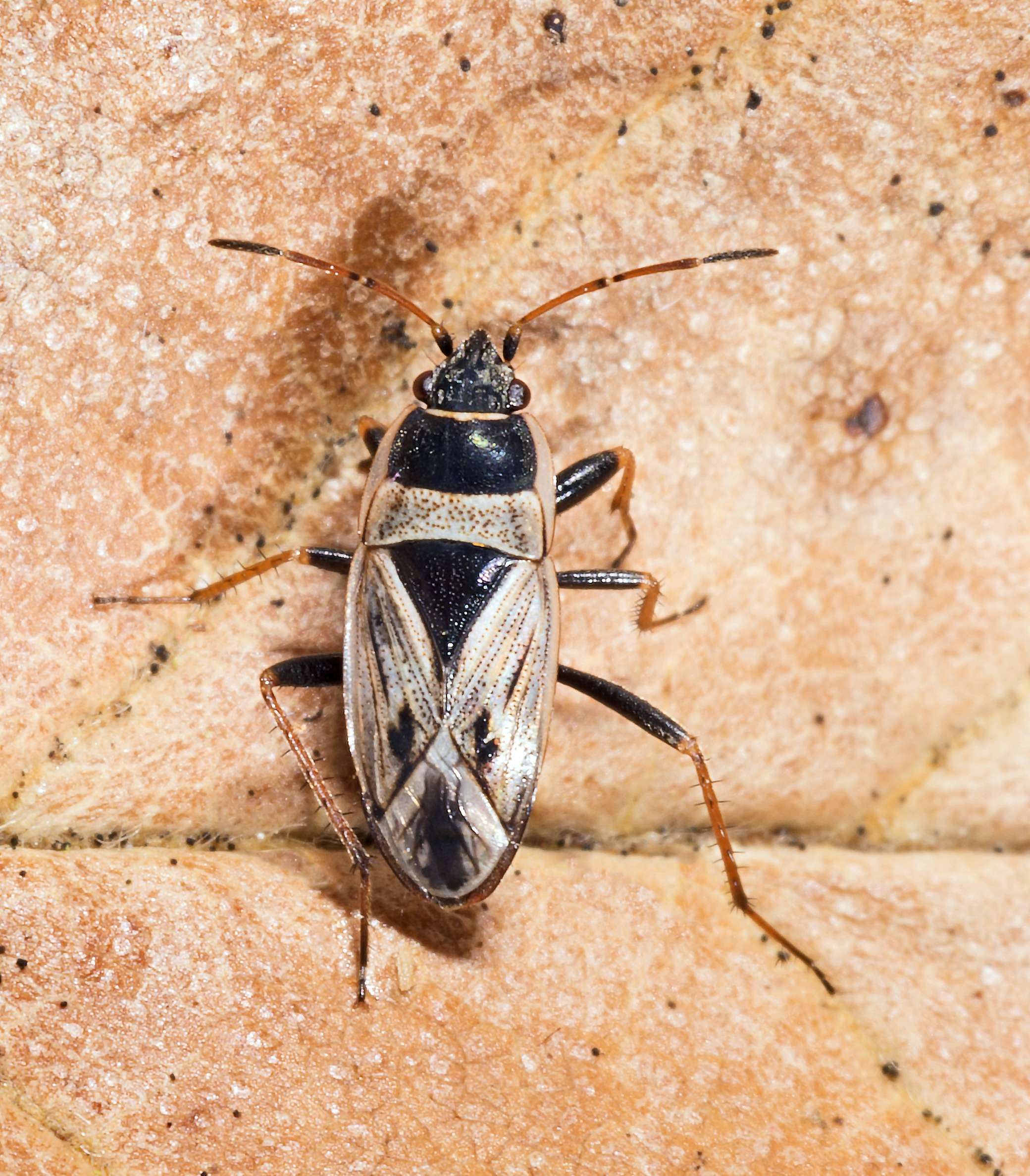
- Xanthochilus quadratus

Scientific classification
- Kingdom: Animalia
- Phylum: Arthropoda
- Clade: Pancrustacea
- Class: Insecta
- Order: Hemiptera
- Suborder: Heteroptera
- Family: Rhyparochromidae
- Tribe: Rhyparochromini
- Genus: Xanthochilus; Stål, 1872

= Xanthochilus =

Genus of true bugs

Xanthochilus is a genus of true bugs belonging to the family Rhyparochromidae. Xanthochilus is often considered a subgenus of Rhyparochromus.

== Species ==
Species within Xanthochilus include:

- Xanthochilus creticus Josifov, 1963
- Xanthochilus douglasi (Fieber, 1864)
- Xanthochilus kangricus (Kirkaldy, 1907)
- Xanthochilus melanopus Kiritshenko & Scudder, 1973
- Xanthochilus minusculus (Reuter, 1885)
- Xanthochilus omissus (Horvath, 1911)
- Xanthochilus persicellus (Kirkaldy, 1909)
- Xanthochilus quadratus (Fabricius, 1798)
- Xanthochilus saturnius Rossi, 1790
- Xanthochilus turanicus (Wagner, 1961)
- Xanthochilus vittiger Kiritshenko & Scudder, 1973
