= Valenzuela fortunatus =

Scientific classification
- Kingdom: Animalia
- Phylum: Arthropoda
- Clade: Pancrustacea
- Class: Insecta
- Order: Psocodea
- Family: Caeciliusidae
- Genus: Valenzuela
- Species: V. fortunatus

Binomial name
- Valenzuela fortunatus (Enderlein, 1929)

Species of booklouse

Valenzuela fortunatus is a species of Psocoptera from Caeciliusidae family that is endemic to the Canary Islands.
