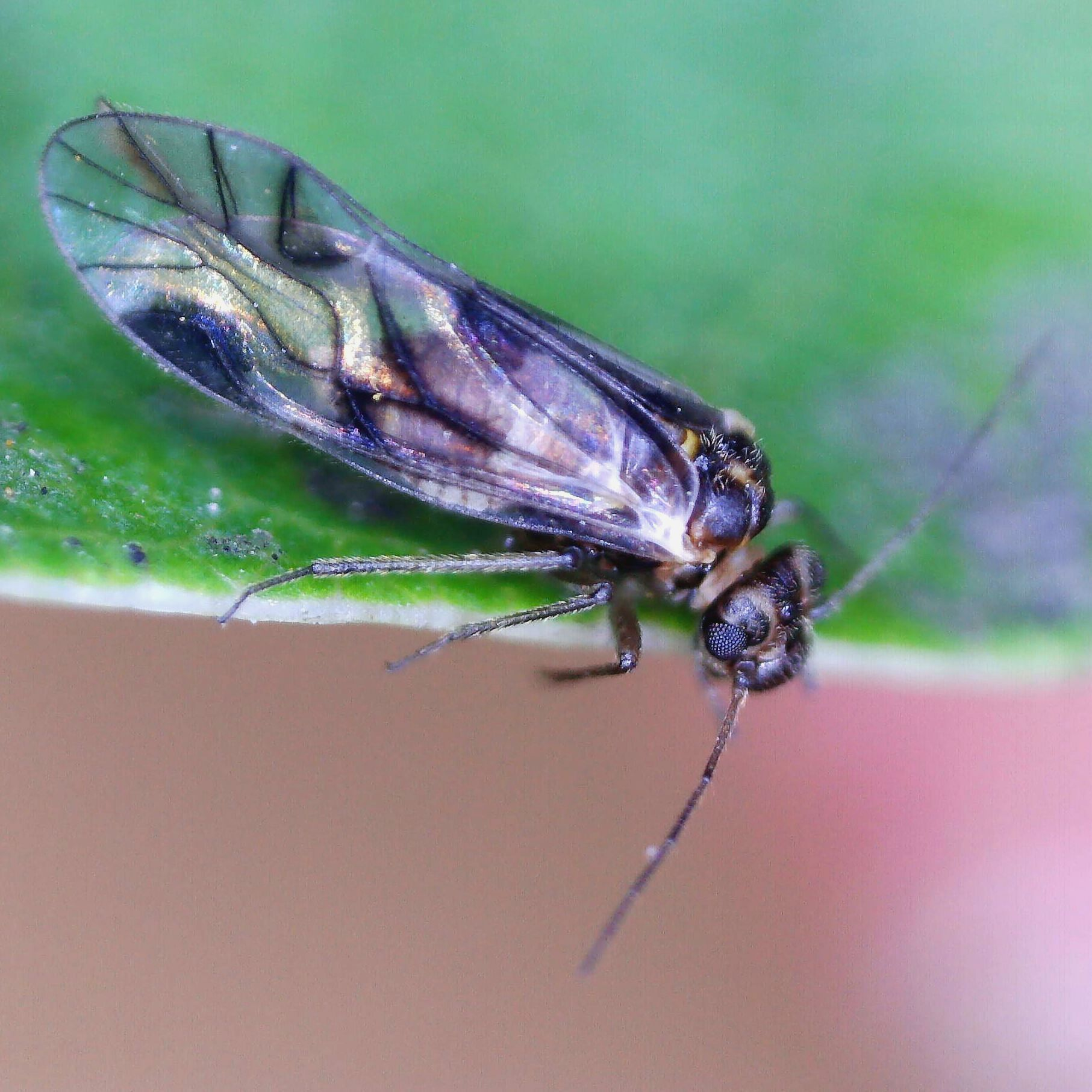

Scientific classification
- Domain: Eukaryota
- Kingdom: Animalia
- Phylum: Arthropoda
- Class: Insecta
- Order: Psocodea
- Family: Elipsocidae
- Genus: Elipsocus
- Species: E. pumilis

Binomial name
- Elipsocus pumilis (Hagen, 1861)

= Elipsocus pumilis =

Species of booklouse

Elipsocus pumilis is a species of Psocoptera from the Elipsocidae family that can be found in Great Britain and Ireland. They also live in countries like Austria, Benelux, Bulgaria, France, Germany, Greece, Hungary, Italy, Latvia, Poland, Romania, Spain, Switzerland, and Scandinavia. The species are black coloured.

== Habitat ==
The species feed on fruits of various kind including horse chestnut, lime, and rowan. It also feeds on trees such as alder, ash, beech, birch, bird cherry, blackthorn, broom, Chinese juniper, elder, fir, hawthorn, hazel, honeysuckle, juniper, larch, pine, sycamore, sea buckthorn, spruce, willow, and yew.
