= Caecilius =

Caecilius may refer to:

- Caecilia gens, an ancient Roman family, including a list of people with the name
  - Lucius Caecilius Iucundus, a Roman inhabitant of Pompeii, and central character in the Cambridge Latin Course series
- Caecilius (insect), a genus of insect
- Kusaila (Latin: Caecilius), a 7th-century Berber king

== See also ==
- Caecilian, a type of amphibian
  - Caecilia, a genus of amphibians in the family Caeciliidae
- Kaecilius, a supervillain from Marvel Comics
