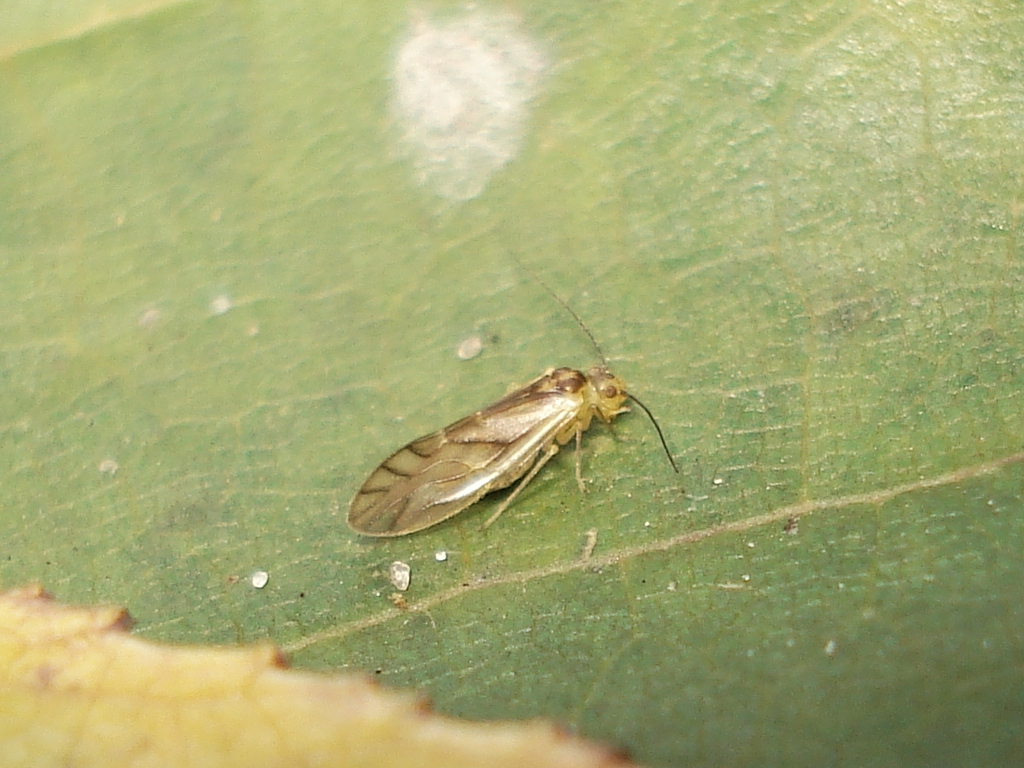

Scientific classification
- Kingdom: Animalia
- Phylum: Arthropoda
- Class: Insecta
- Order: Psocodea
- Family: Caeciliusidae
- Genus: Valenzuela
- Species: V. flavidus

Binomial name
- Valenzuela flavidus (Stephens, 1836)

= Valenzuela flavidus =

Species of booklouse

Valenzuela flavidus is a species of Psocoptera from Caeciliusidae family that can be found in the United Kingdom, and sometimes Ireland. They are also common in Austria, Azores, Belgium, Bulgaria, Canary Islands, Croatia, Denmark, Finland, France, Germany, Greece, Hungary, Italy, Latvia, Luxembourg, Norway, Poland, Portugal, Romania, Spain, Sweden, Switzerland, and the Netherlands. It is also widespread in Near East. The species are yellowish-black coloured.

== Habitat ==
The species feeds on various microflora that grow on trees including:

- Alder
- Ash
- Beech
- Berberis
- Birch
- Blackthorn
- Broom
- Elder
- Elm
- Hawthorn
- Hazel
- Ivy
- Laurel
- Oak
- Pine
- Poplar
- Sallow
- Spindle
- Sycamore
- Sea buckthorn
- Willow

It also likes to feed on plants like guelder rose and rhododendron and rowan berries. Stephens (1836)

Original name: Psocus flavidus Stephens, 1836

Publication: Illustrations of British Entomology

Genus at the time: Psocus (a broad, early catch-all genus for psocids) Later history

Species was later transferred to the genus Valenzuela after it was erected by Navás (1924).

Placement in Valenzuela survived later revisionary work, unlike several species originally described by Navás himself. When Navás established the genus Valenzuela in 1924, he introduced the genus name and placed several newly described species of his own within it. Subsequent taxonomic studies re-evaluated these classifications. Martin Meinander (1979) reviewed European Psocoptera attributed to Navás and demonstrated that several species placed in Valenzuela were not taxonomically distinct, were incorrectly assigned at the genus level, or represented earlier described species under different names. As a result, these taxa were treated as junior synonyms or transferred to other genera.

Later catalogues, including the global synthesis by Lienhard and Smithers (2002), adopted these revisions and reflected the resulting changes in the composition of the genus Valenzuela.

Several species currently retained in Valenzuela were originally described by earlier authors, such as Valenzuela flavidus (Stephens, 1836) and Valenzuela subflavus (Rambur, 1842), and their placement within the genus has been maintained following later revisionary work.
