= Elipsocus pusillus =

Scientific classification
- Kingdom: Animalia
- Phylum: Arthropoda
- Clade: Pancrustacea
- Class: Insecta
- Order: Psocodea
- Family: Elipsocidae
- Genus: Elipsocus
- Species: E. pusillus

Binomial name
- Elipsocus pusillus Lienhard, 1996

Species of booklouse

Elipsocus pusillus is a species of Psocoptera from the Elipsocidae family that is endemic to Cyprus.
