= Epicaeciliini =

Scientific classification
- Domain: Eukaryota
- Kingdom: Animalia
- Phylum: Arthropoda
- Class: Insecta
- Order: Psocodea
- Family: Caeciliusidae
- Subfamily: Caeciliusinae
- Tribe: Epicaeciliini; Mockford, 2000

Genera
- Epicaecilius Mockford, 2000; Nothocaecilius Schmidt & New, 2008; Orocaecilius Mockford, 2000; Tasmanocaecilius Schmidt & New, 2008

Tribe of booklouse

Epicaeciliini is a tribe of Psocoptera from the family Caeciliusidae.
