= Pseudopsocus fusciceps =

Scientific classification
- Domain: Eukaryota
- Kingdom: Animalia
- Phylum: Arthropoda
- Class: Insecta
- Order: Psocodea
- Family: Elipsocidae
- Genus: Pseudopsocus
- Species: P. fusciceps

Binomial name
- Pseudopsocus fusciceps (Reuter, 1893)

Species of booklouse

Pseudopsocus fusciceps is a species of Psocoptera from Elipsocidae family that can be found in Austria, Belgium, Finland, Germany, Great Britain, Greece, Norway, Poland, Spain, Sweden, and the Netherlands.
