= Valenzuela labrostylus =

Scientific classification
- Kingdom: Animalia
- Phylum: Arthropoda
- Clade: Pancrustacea
- Class: Insecta
- Order: Psocodea
- Family: Caeciliusidae
- Genus: Valenzuela
- Species: V. labrostylus

Binomial name
- Valenzuela labrostylus (Lienhard, 2002)

Species of booklouse

Valenzuela labrostylus is a species of Psocoptera from Caeciliusidae family that is endemic to Corsica.
