= Stenocaecilius =

Scientific classification
- Domain: Eukaryota
- Kingdom: Animalia
- Phylum: Arthropoda
- Class: Insecta
- Order: Psocodea
- Family: Caeciliusidae
- Subfamily: Caeciliusinae
- Genus: Stenocaecilius; Mockford, 2000

Genus of booklice

Stenocaecilius is a genus of lizard barklice in the family Caeciliusidae. There are more than 40 described species in Stenocaecilius.

== Species ==
These 45 species belong to the genus Stenocaecilius:

- Stenocaecilius analis (Banks, 1931)
- Stenocaecilius andromimus (Badonnel, 1955)
- Stenocaecilius angustipennis (Badonnel, 1949)
- Stenocaecilius antennalis (Badonnel, 1948)
- Stenocaecilius antillanus (Banks, 1938)
- Stenocaecilius arotellus (Banks, 1942)
- Stenocaecilius australis (Enderlein, 1903)
- Stenocaecilius bamboutensis (Badonnel, 1943)
- Stenocaecilius benoiti (Badonnel, 1976)
- Stenocaecilius caboverdensis (Meinander, 1966)
- Stenocaecilius casarum (Badonnel, 1931)
- Stenocaecilius congolensis (Badonnel, 1946)
- Stenocaecilius crassicornis (Enderlein, 1931)
- Stenocaecilius decolor (Badonnel, 1967)
- Stenocaecilius dundoensis (Badonnel, 1955)
- Stenocaecilius elongatus (Smithers, 1964)
- Stenocaecilius fallax (Badonnel, 1948)
- Stenocaecilius fuscicornis (Badonnel, 1977)
- Stenocaecilius gilvus (Pearman, 1932)
- Stenocaecilius glossopterus (Badonnel, 1931)
- Stenocaecilius griveaudi (Badonnel, 1976)
- Stenocaecilius guineensis (Baz, 1990)
- Stenocaecilius insularum (Mockford, 1966)
- Stenocaecilius insulatus (Smithers & Thornton, 1974)
- Stenocaecilius kivuensis (Badonnel, 1959)
- Stenocaecilius lineatus (Smithers, 1977)
- Stenocaecilius linguipennis (Badonnel, 1943)
- Stenocaecilius lucidus (Pearman, 1932)
- Stenocaecilius lundensis (Badonnel, 1955)
- Stenocaecilius machadoi (Badonnel, 1955)
- Stenocaecilius marianus (Thornton, Lee & Chui, 1972)
- Stenocaecilius moffiensis (Badonnel, 1977)
- Stenocaecilius oxycopeus (Ribaga, 1911)
- Stenocaecilius pacificus (Smithers & Thornton, 1974)
- Stenocaecilius petchkovskya (Badonnel, 1955)
- Stenocaecilius photophilus (Badonnel, 1977)
- Stenocaecilius pictifrons (Thornton & Wong, 1966)
- Stenocaecilius propinquifallax (Turner & Cheke, 1983)
- Stenocaecilius quercus (Edwards, 1950)
- Stenocaecilius rutshuruanus (Badonnel, 1948)
- Stenocaecilius suturalis (Badonnel, 1955)
- Stenocaecilius transversalis (Badonnel, 1948)
- Stenocaecilius turneri (New, 1977)
- Stenocaecilius vilhenai (Badonnel, 1955)
- Stenocaecilius voov (Enderlein, 1931)
