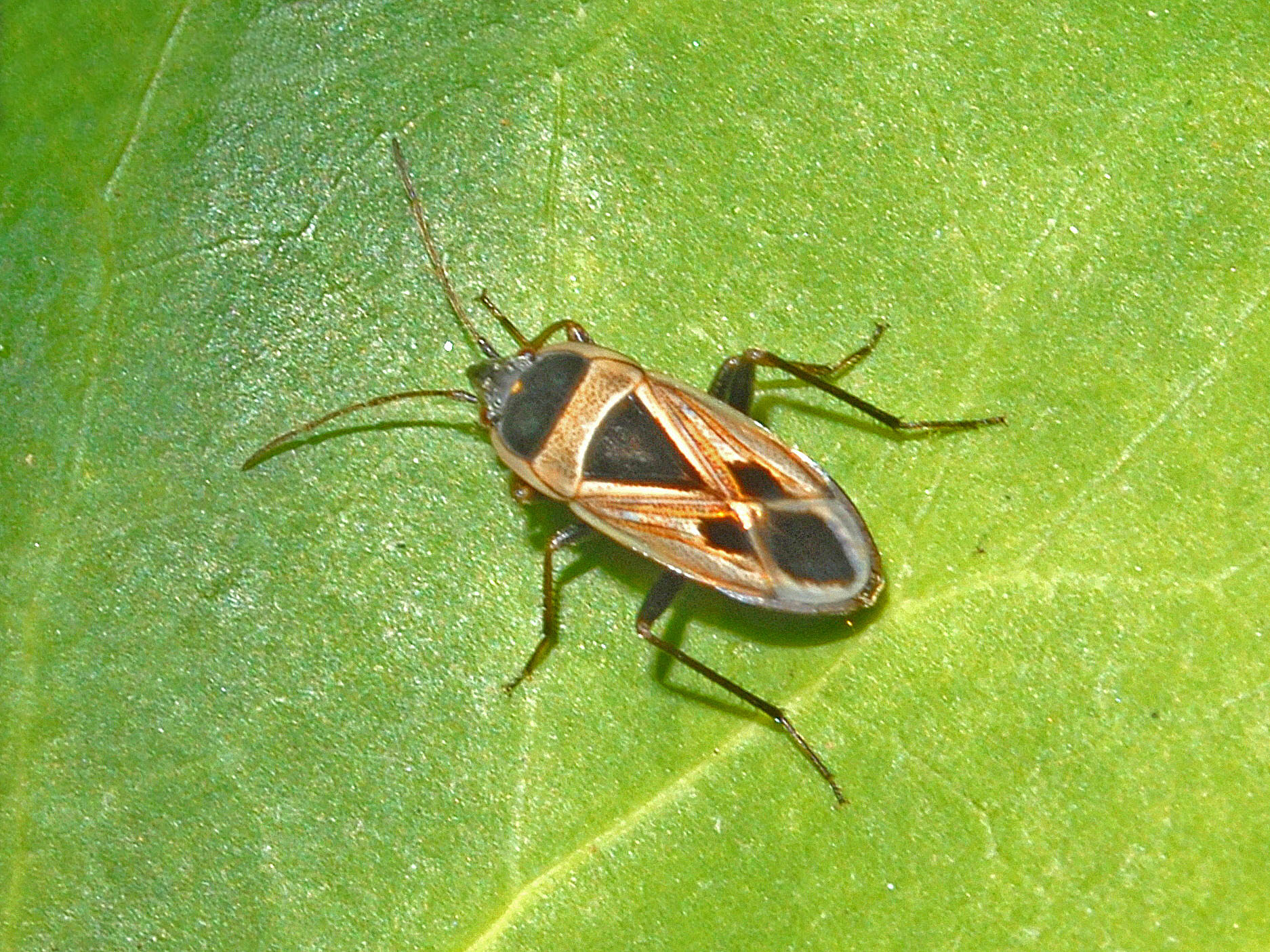

Scientific classification
- Kingdom: Animalia
- Phylum: Arthropoda
- Class: Insecta
- Order: Hemiptera
- Suborder: Heteroptera
- Family: Rhyparochromidae
- Genus: Xanthochilus
- Species: X. saturnius

Binomial name
- Xanthochilus saturnius (Rossi, 1790)

Synonyms
- Rhyparochromus saturnius (Rossi, 1790); Cimex saturnius Rossi, 1790

= Xanthochilus saturnius =

Species of true bug

Xanthochilus saturnius, the Mediterranean seed bug, is a species of true bugs belonging to the family Rhyparochromidae.

Xanthochilus is sometimes considered a subgenus of Rhyparochromus, in which case this species is called Rhyparochromus saturnius or Rhyparochromus (Xanthochilus) saturnius.

== Distribution ==
This species is present in southern Europe (Bosnia and Herzegovina, Croatia, European Turkey, France, Greece, Italy, North Macedonia, Portugal, Slovenia, Spain, Bulgaria, South European Russia) and in the Nearctic realm (Greenland, Canada, USA and northern Mexico).

== Description ==
Xanthochilus saturnius can reach a length of 6–8 millimetres (0.24–0.31 in). These small true bugs have distinctive markings of black-on-tan. The head and scutellum are black, while pronotum shows a large black band and a band of stippled brown. Elytra are brown, with two black spots. Membrane has a large black mark too.

== Biology ==
Adults of these bugs overwinter in gregarious clusters. They emerge in spring (April or May). Adults and larvae feed together on the same plant and on fallen seeds. New adults can be seen by July. Main host plants are Stachys species and other Lamiaceae, and Scrophulariaceae (Verbascum lychnitis).
