= Propsocus =

Scientific classification
- Domain: Eukaryota
- Kingdom: Animalia
- Phylum: Arthropoda
- Class: Insecta
- Order: Psocodea
- Family: Elipsocidae
- Genus: Propsocus; McLachlan, 1866

Genus of booklice

Propsocus is a genus of damp barklice in the family Elipsocidae. There are at least three described species in Propsocus.

== Species ==
These three species belong to the genus Propsocus:

- Propsocus frodshami Schmidt & New, 2008
- Propsocus pallipes McLachlan, 1866
- Propsocus pulchripennis (Perkins, 1899)
