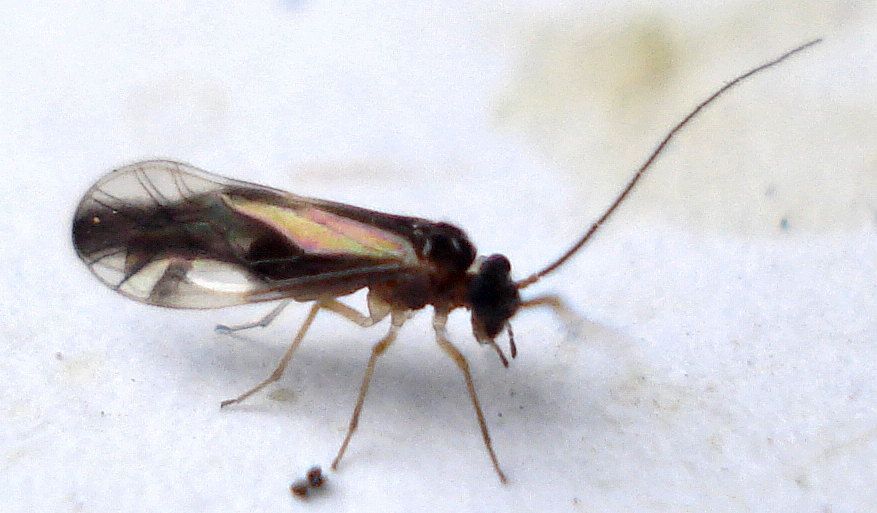
- Caecilius fuscopterus

Scientific classification
- Kingdom: Animalia
- Phylum: Arthropoda
- Clade: Pancrustacea
- Class: Insecta
- Order: Psocodea
- Family: Caeciliusidae
- Subfamily: Caeciliusinae
- Genus: Caecilius; Curtis, 1837

Species
- Caecilius dimorphus; Caecilius fuscopterus; Caecilius insulatus; Caecilius pacificus; Caecilius singularis

Synonyms
- Coecilius (Lienhard & Smithers, 2002); Mepachycera (Enderlein, 1925); Valenzuela (Navas, 1924)

= Caecilius (insect) =

Genus of booklice

Caecilius is a genus of Psocoptera from the family Caeciliusidae, the lizard barklice. Species are found all around the world.
