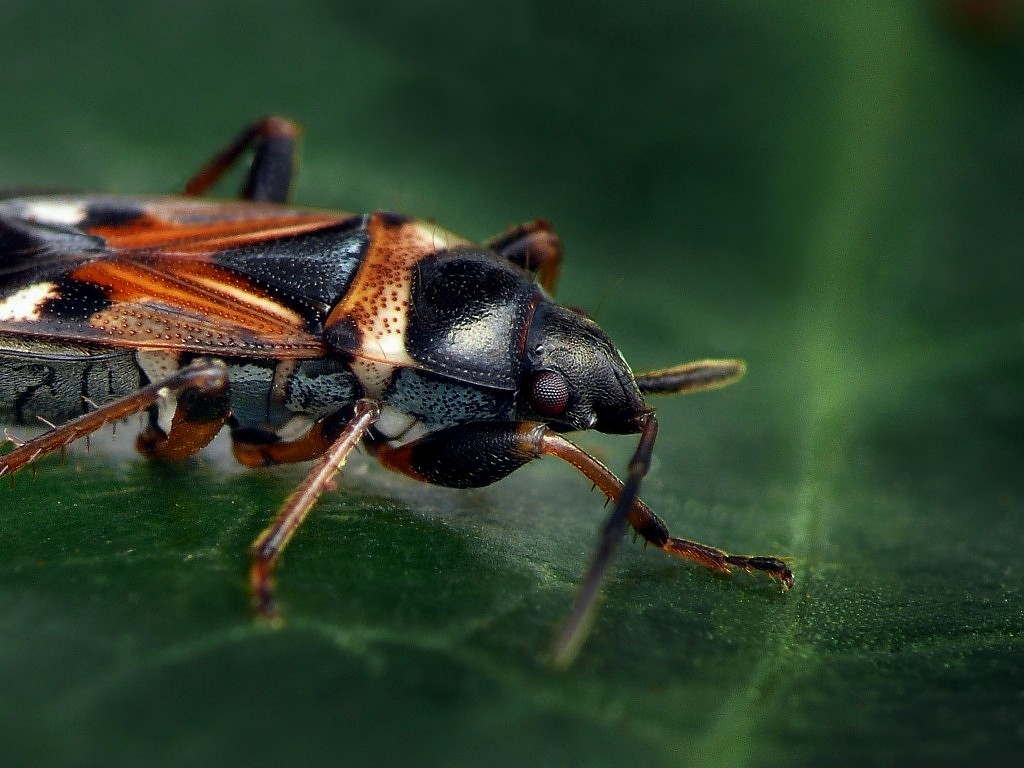

Scientific classification
- Domain: Eukaryota
- Kingdom: Animalia
- Phylum: Arthropoda
- Class: Insecta
- Order: Hemiptera
- Suborder: Heteroptera
- Family: Rhyparochromidae
- Tribe: Rhyparochromini
- Genus: Raglius
- Species: R. alboacuminatus

Binomial name
- Raglius alboacuminatus (Goeze, 1778)

= Raglius alboacuminatus =

Species of true bug

Raglius alboacuminatus is a species of dirt-colored seed bug in the family Rhyparochromidae. It is found in Africa, Europe and Northern Asia (excluding China), and North America.

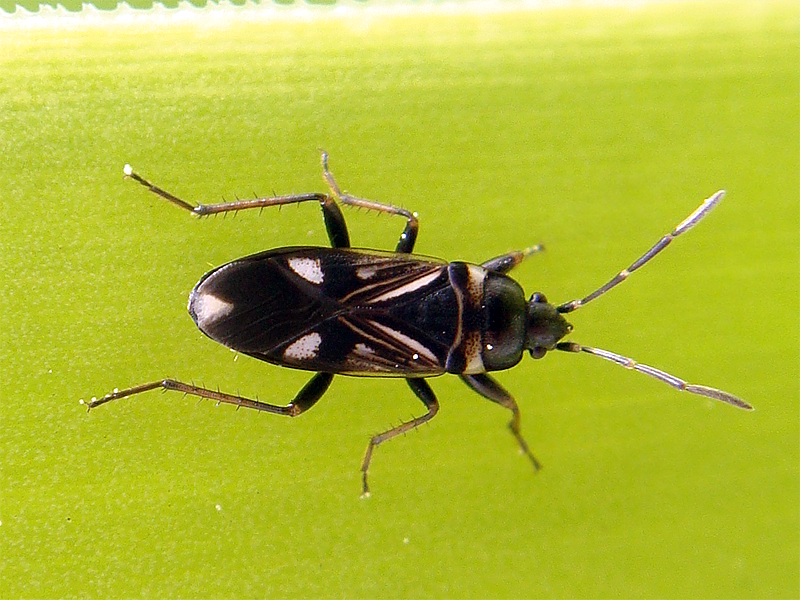

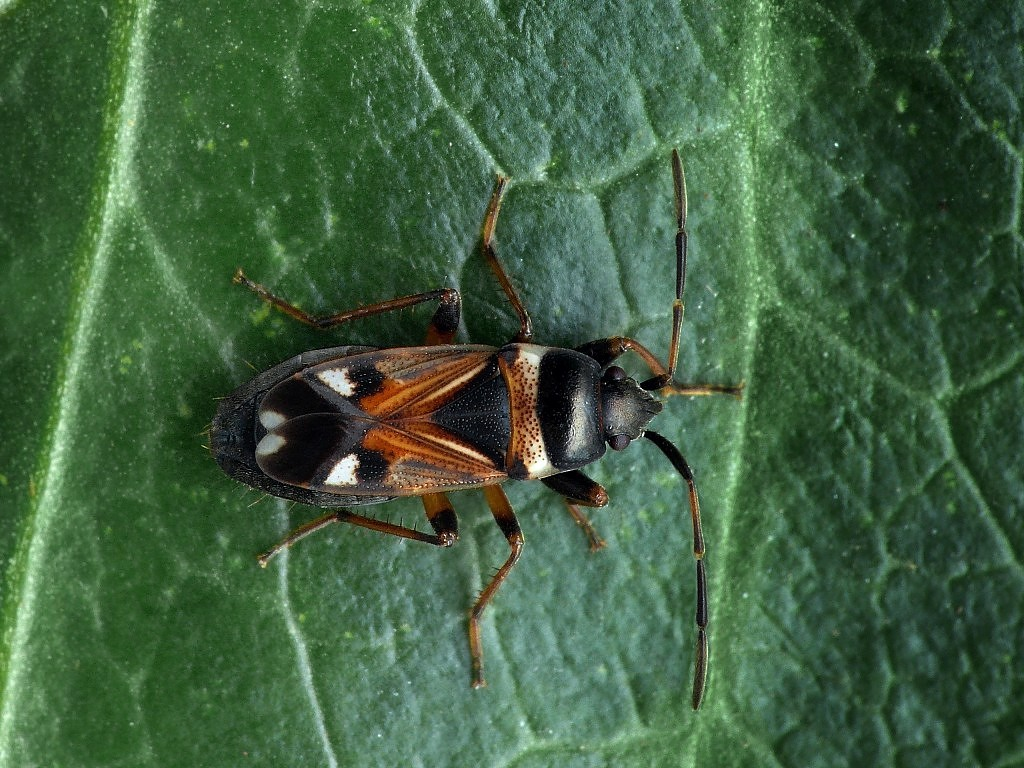

== Subspecies ==
These six subspecies belong to the species Raglius alboacuminatus:

- Raglius alboacuminatus alboacuminatus (Goeze, 1778)
- Raglius alboacuminatus bicolor (Horvath, 1911)
- Raglius alboacuminatus flavatus (Horvath, 1882)
- Raglius alboacuminatus funereus (Puton, 1878)
- Raglius alboacuminatus implagiatus (Stichel, 1957)
- Raglius alboacuminatus nigrus (Michalk, 1938)
