= Cuneopalpus =

Scientific classification
- Domain: Eukaryota
- Kingdom: Animalia
- Phylum: Arthropoda
- Class: Insecta
- Order: Psocodea
- Family: Elipsocidae
- Genus: Cuneopalpus; Badonnel, 1943
- Species: C. cyanops

Binomial name
- Cuneopalpus cyanops (Rostock, 1876)

Synonyms
- Eclipsocus cyanops Rostock, 1876

Genus of booklice

Cuneopalpus is a genus of damp barklice in the family Elipsocidae. There is one described species in the genus, Cuneopalpus cyanops. C. cyanops is found in Benelux, Croatia, Greece, Italy, Ireland, Scandinavia, the United Kingdom, Central Europe, northern Asia, and North America. They are orange in color. It feeds on hemlock, oak and sea buckthorn.

It was first formally described as Eclipsocus cyanops in 1876, but moved to the newly erected genus Cuneopalpus in 1943 by French entomologist André Badonnel in his Faune de France: 42, Pscocoptères (Fauna of France: 42, Psocoptera).
