= Pseudopsocus =

Scientific classification
- Domain: Eukaryota
- Kingdom: Animalia
- Phylum: Arthropoda
- Class: Insecta
- Order: Psocodea
- Family: Elipsocidae
- Genus: Pseudopsocus; Kolbe, 1882

Genus of insects

Pseudopsocus is a genus in the family Elipsocidae.

== Species ==
These species belong to the genus Pseudopsocus:

- Pseudopsocus rostocki
- Pseudopsocus fusciceps
- Pseudopsocus meridionalis
