= Elipsocus =

Scientific classification
- Domain: Eukaryota
- Kingdom: Animalia
- Phylum: Arthropoda
- Class: Insecta
- Order: Psocodea
- Family: Elipsocidae
- Subfamily: Elipsocinae
- Genus: Elipsocus; Hagen, 1866

Genus of booklice

Elipsocus is a genus of damp barklice in the family Elipsocidae. There are more than 20 described species in Elipsocus.

== Species ==
These 27 species belong to the genus Elipsocus:

- Elipsocus abdominalis Reuter, 1904
- Elipsocus alettae Smithers, 1962
- Elipsocus alpinus Smithers, 1962
- Elipsocus annulatus Roesler, 1954
- Elipsocus azoricus Meinander, 1975
- Elipsocus brincki Badonnel, 1963
- Elipsocus capensis Smithers, 1962
- Elipsocus coloripennis Lienhard, 1996
- Elipsocus fasciatus (Navas, 1908)
- Elipsocus guentheri Mockford, 1980
- Elipsocus hyalinus (Stephens, 1836)
- Elipsocus ignobilis Broadhead & Richards, 1982
- Elipsocus kuriliensis Vishnyakova, 1986
- Elipsocus labralis Lienhard, 1996
- Elipsocus lanceloticus Baz, 1991
- Elipsocus marplatensis Williner, 1943
- Elipsocus mbizianus Smithers, 1962
- Elipsocus moebiusi Tetens, 1891
- Elipsocus nuptialis Roesler, 1954
- Elipsocus obscurus Mockford, 1980
- Elipsocus oligotrichus Thornton, 1959
- Elipsocus pumilis (Hagen, 1861)
- Elipsocus pusillus Lienhard, 1996
- Elipsocus rubrostigma Navas, 1934
- Elipsocus ustulatus Smithers, 1965
- Elipsocus viridimicans Günther Enderlein, 1900
- † Elipsocus abnormis (Pictet-Baraban & Hagen, 1856)
