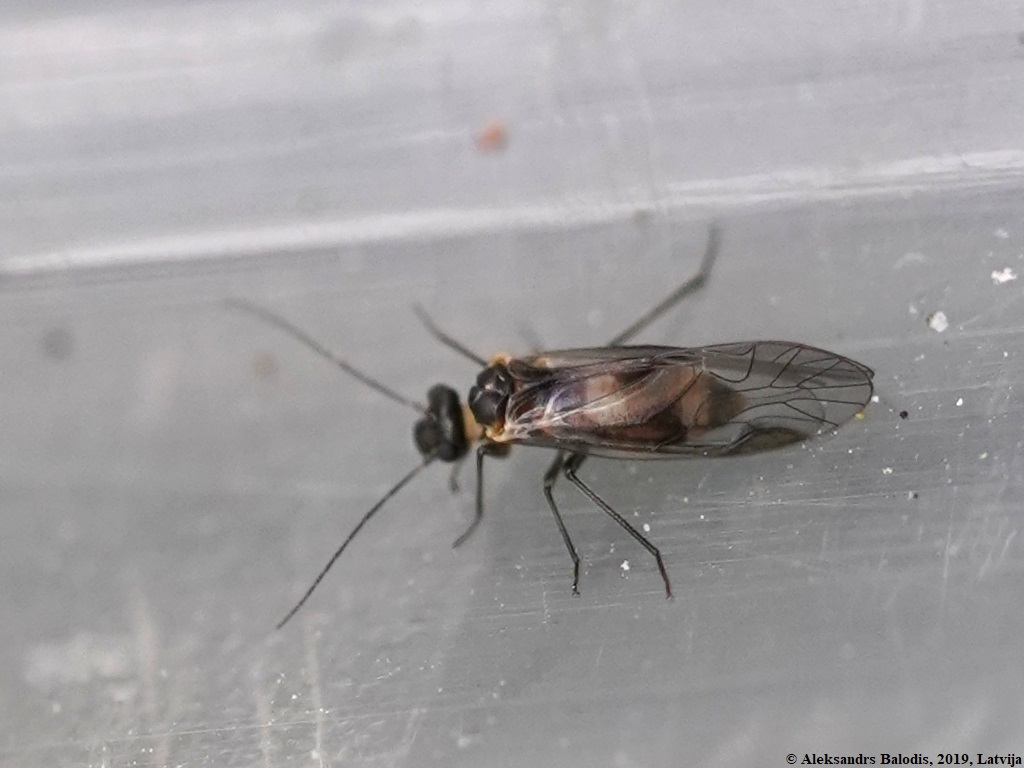

Scientific classification
- Domain: Eukaryota
- Kingdom: Animalia
- Phylum: Arthropoda
- Class: Insecta
- Order: Psocodea
- Family: Elipsocidae
- Genus: Elipsocus
- Species: E. hyalinus

Binomial name
- Elipsocus hyalinus (Stephens, 1836)

= Elipsocus hyalinus =

Species of booklouse

Elipsocus hyalinus is a species of Psocoptera from the Elipsocidae family that can be found in Great Britain and Ireland. They are also common in countries like Austria, Belgium, Cyprus, Denmark, Finland, France, Germany, Greece, Hungary, Italy, Poland, Portugal, Romania, Spain, Sweden, Switzerland, and the Netherlands. The species are yellowish-black coloured.

== Habitat ==
The species feed on fruits and berries of various kind including horse chestnut, plum, rowan, snowberry and wayfaring tree. It also feeds on trees such as alder, ash, beech, birch, blackthorn, broom, Chinese juniper, elder, hawthorn, hazel, ivy, juniper, larch, oak, pine, sycamore, sea buckthorn, spruce, and turkey oak, and willow.
