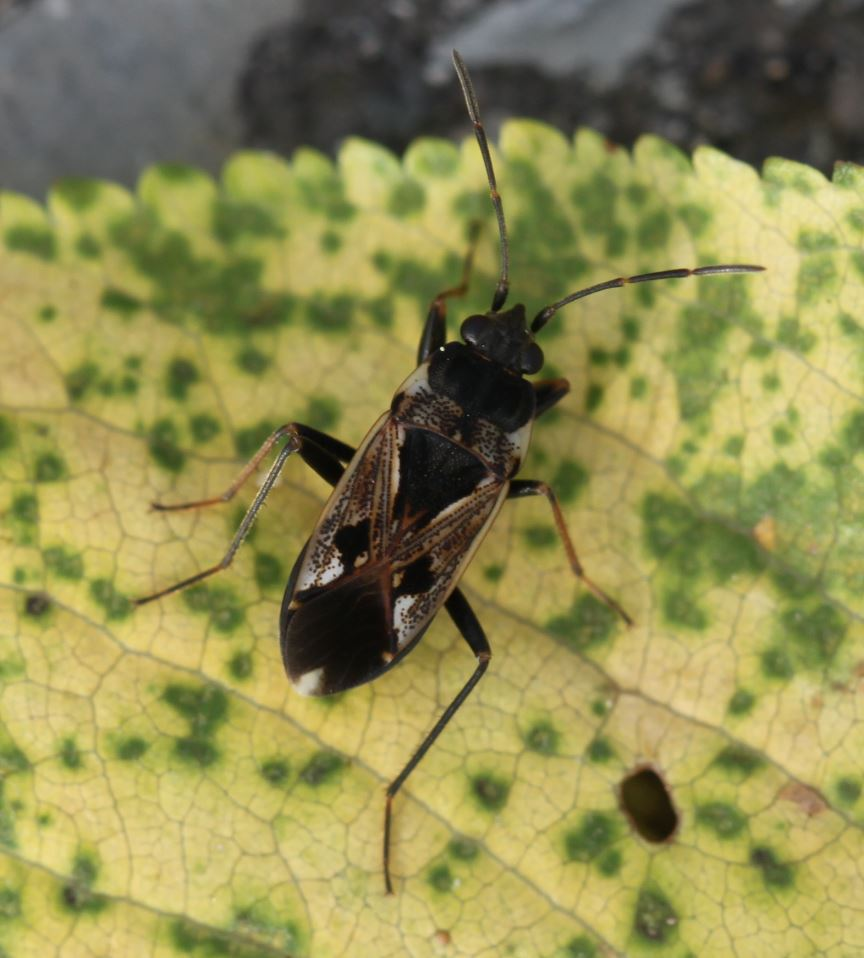

Scientific classification
- Kingdom: Animalia
- Phylum: Arthropoda
- Clade: Pancrustacea
- Class: Insecta
- Order: Hemiptera
- Suborder: Heteroptera
- Family: Rhyparochromidae
- Subfamily: Rhyparochrominae
- Tribe: Rhyparochromini
- Genus: Rhyparochromus; Hahn, 1826
- Species: R. vulgaris

Binomial name
- Rhyparochromus vulgaris (Schilling, 1829)

= Rhyparochromus vulgaris =

Species of true bug

Rhyparochromus vulgaris is a species of dirt-colored seed bug in the family Rhyparochromidae. It is found in Africa, Europe and Northern Asia (excluding China), North America, and Southern Asia. This bug was first recorded in North America in 2001.

Rhyparochromus vulgaris is sometimes considered a member of the genus Raglius, Raglius vulgaris.

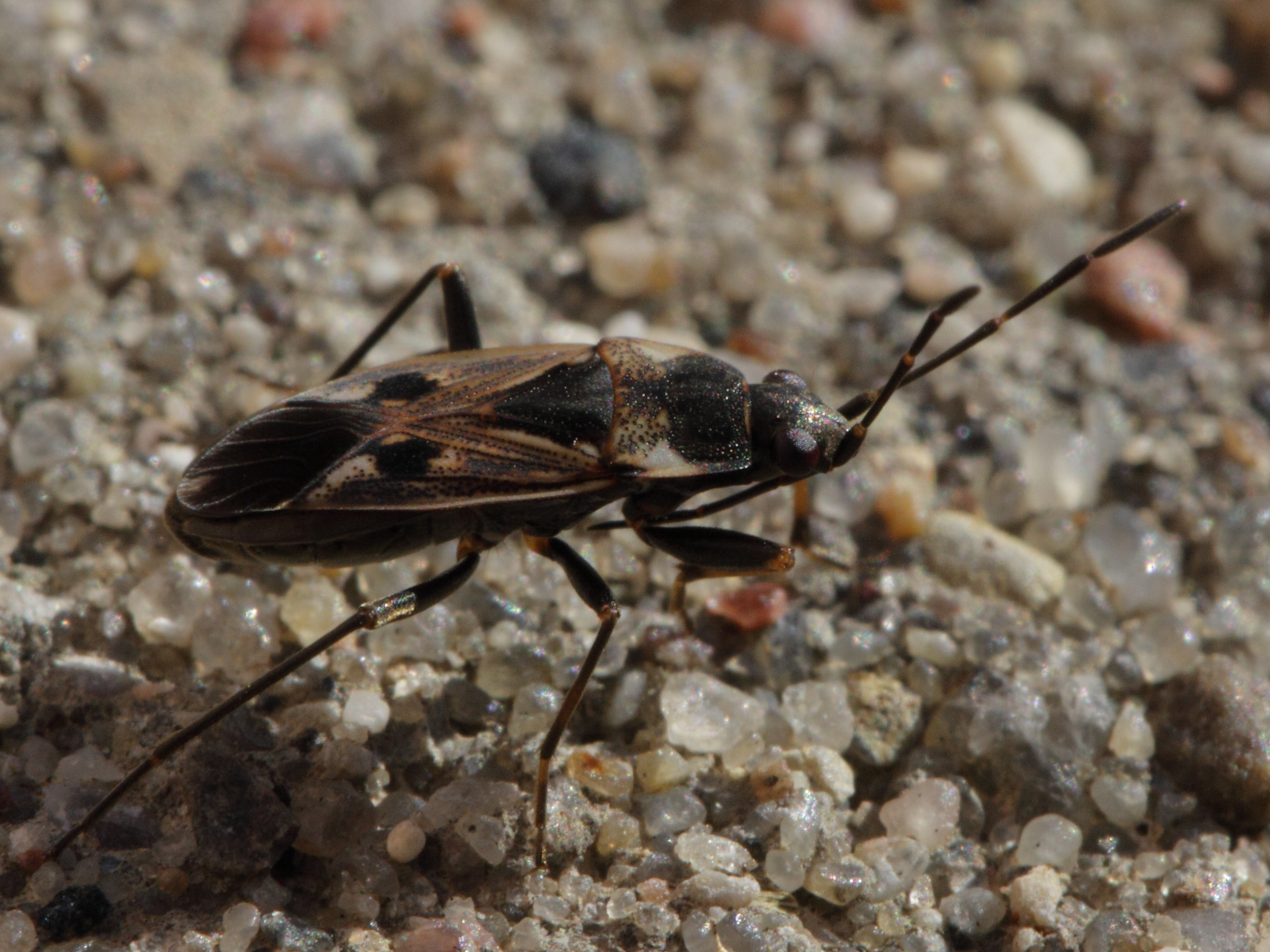

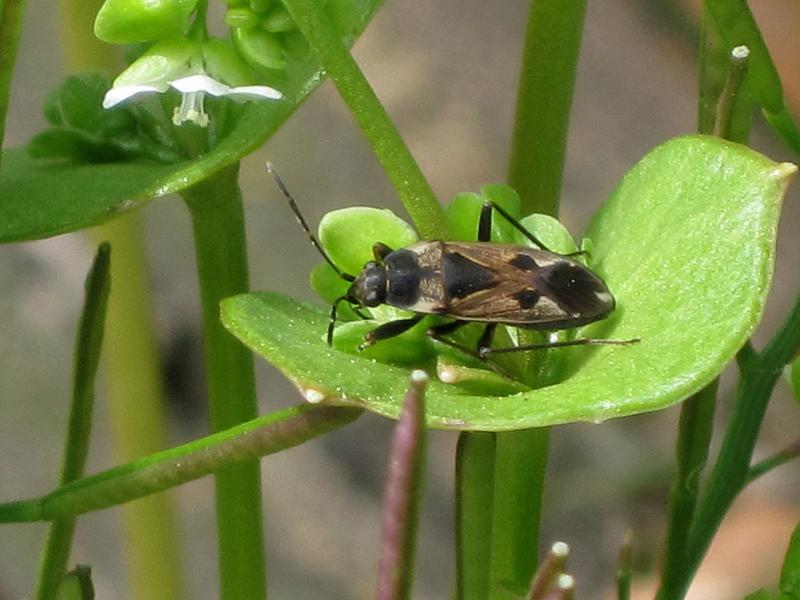
