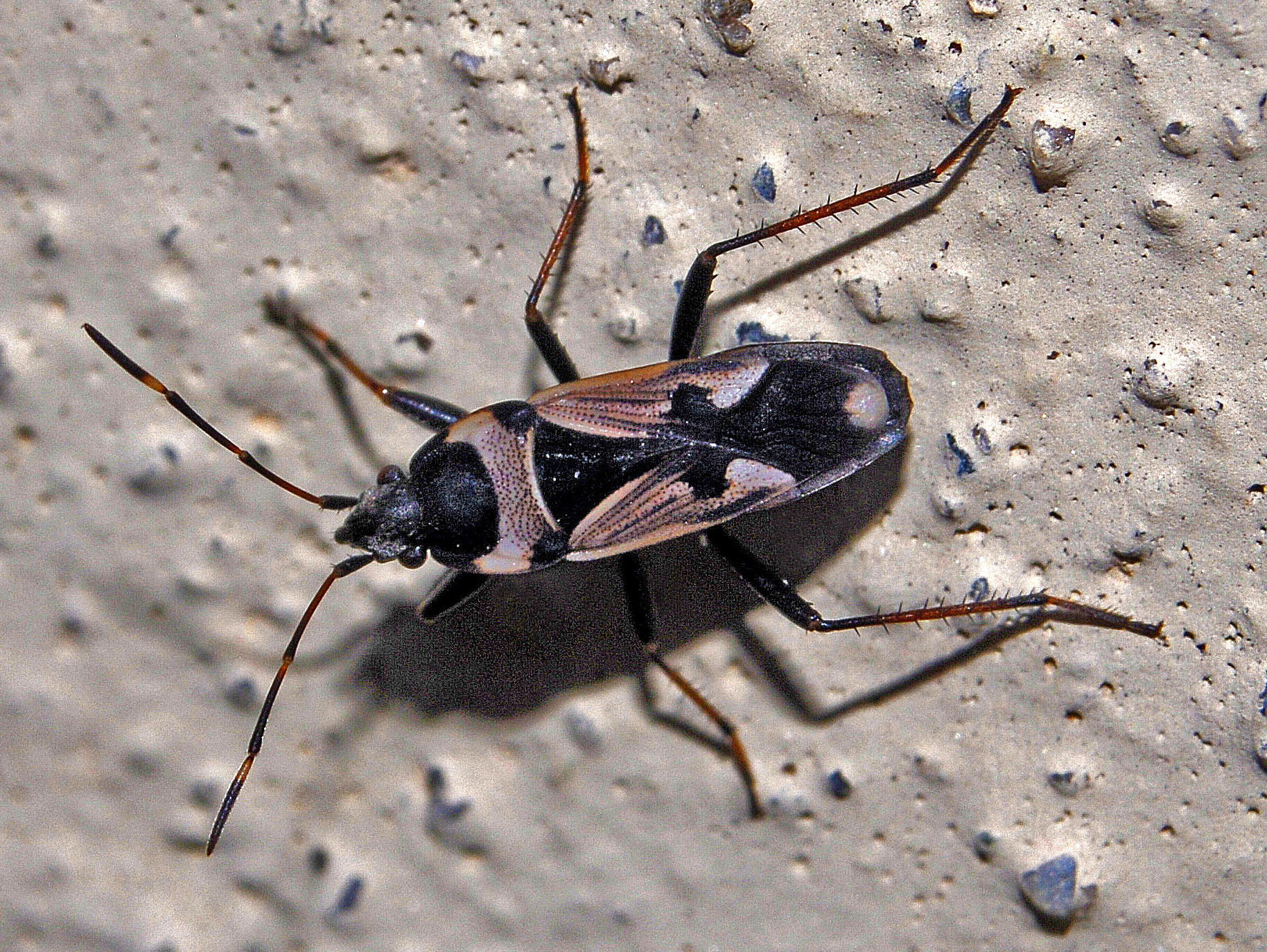
- Raglius confusus

Scientific classification
- Kingdom: Animalia
- Phylum: Arthropoda
- Class: Insecta
- Order: Hemiptera
- Suborder: Heteroptera
- Family: Rhyparochromidae
- Subfamily: Rhyparochrominae
- Tribe: Rhyparochromini
- Genus: Raglius; Stal, 1872

= Raglius =

Genus of true bugs

Raglius is a genus of dirt-colored seed bugs in the family Rhyparochromidae. There are about 11 described species in Raglius.

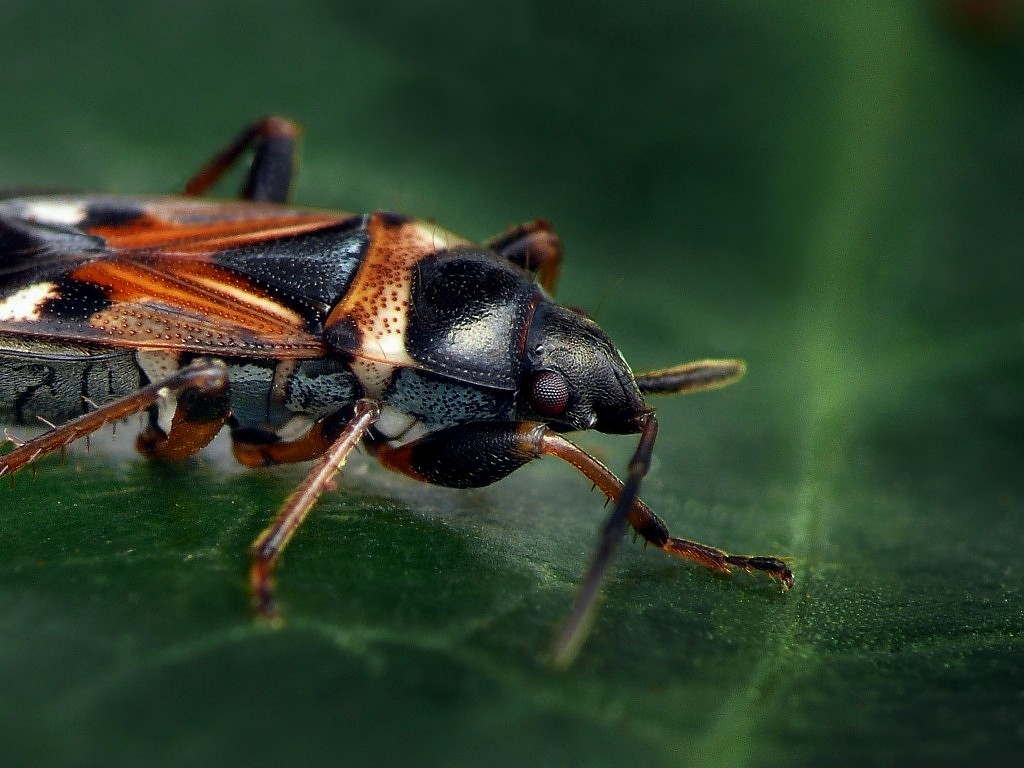
Raglius alboacuminatus

== Species ==
These 11 species belong to the genus Raglius:

- Raglius alboacuminatus (Goeze, 1778)
- Raglius confusus (Reuter, 1886)
- Raglius pineti (Herrich-Schaeffer, 1835)
- Raglius simplex (Jakovlev, 1883)
- Raglius tisifone
- Raglius tristis (Fieber, 1861)
- Raglius vulgaris (Schilling, 1829) (sometimes considered Rhyparochromus vulgaris)
- Raglius zarudnyi (Jakovlev, 1905)
- † Raglius austerus Statz & Wagner, 1950
- † Raglius decoratus Statz & Wagner, 1950
- † Raglius pulchellus Statz & Wagner, 1950
