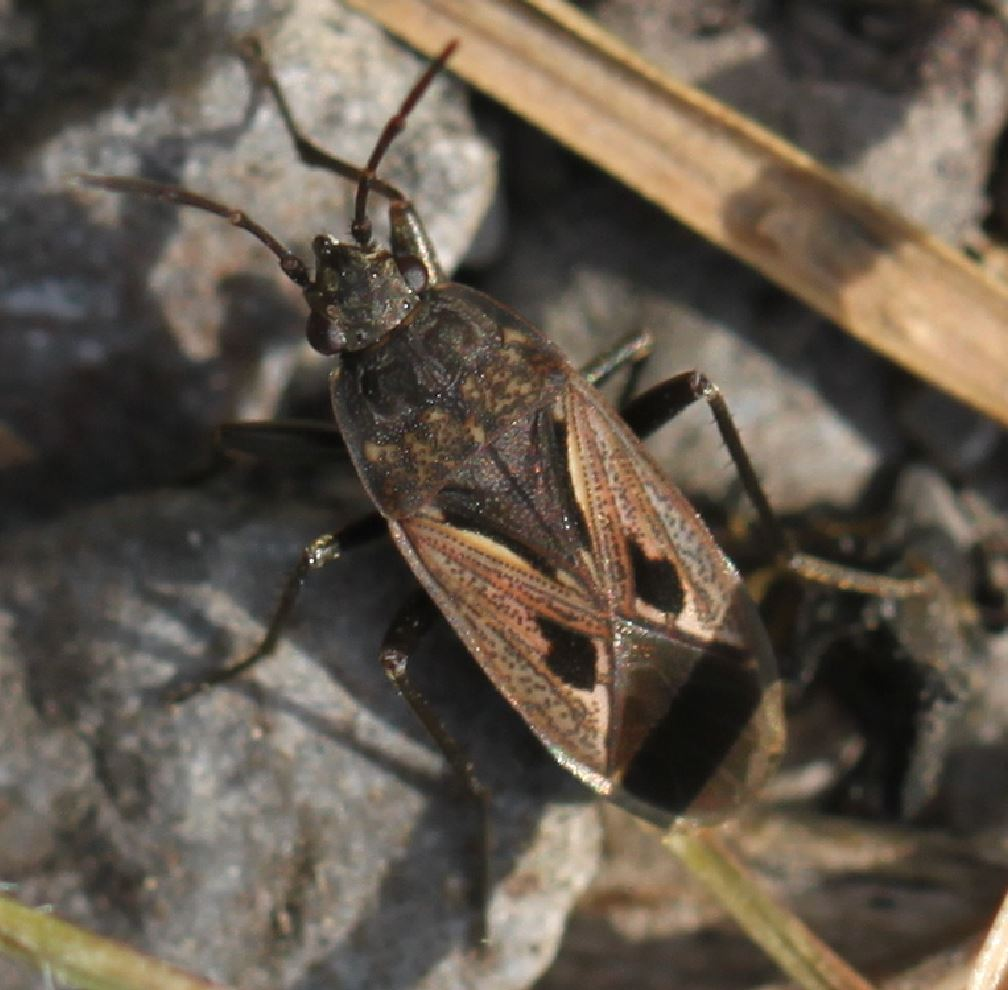
- Rhyparochromus pini

Scientific classification
- Kingdom: Animalia
- Phylum: Arthropoda
- Clade: Pancrustacea
- Class: Insecta
- Order: Hemiptera
- Suborder: Heteroptera
- Family: Rhyparochromidae
- Subfamily: Rhyparochrominae
- Tribe: Rhyparochromini
- Genus: Rhyparochromus
- Species: R. pini

Binomial name
- Rhyparochromus pini Linnaeus, 1758

= Rhyparochromus pini =

Species of dirt-colored seed bug

Rhyparochromus pini is a species of dirt-colored seed bug in the family Rhyparochromidae, found in the Palearctic.

== Subspecies ==
These two subspecies belong to the species Rhyparochromus pini:

- Rhyparochromus pini intermedius (Puton, 1888)
- Rhyparochromus pini pini Linnaeus, 1758
