= Epicaecilius =

Scientific classification
- Kingdom: Animalia
- Phylum: Arthropoda
- Class: Insecta
- Order: Psocodea
- Family: Caeciliusidae
- Tribe: Epicaeciliini
- Genus: Epicaecilius; Mockford, 2000

Species
- Epicaecilius pilipennis (Lienhard, 1996); Epicaecilius smithersorum Mockford, 2000; Epicaecilius variegatus Mockford, 2000

Genus of booklouse

Epicaecilius is a genus of Psocoptera from the Caeciliusidae family.
