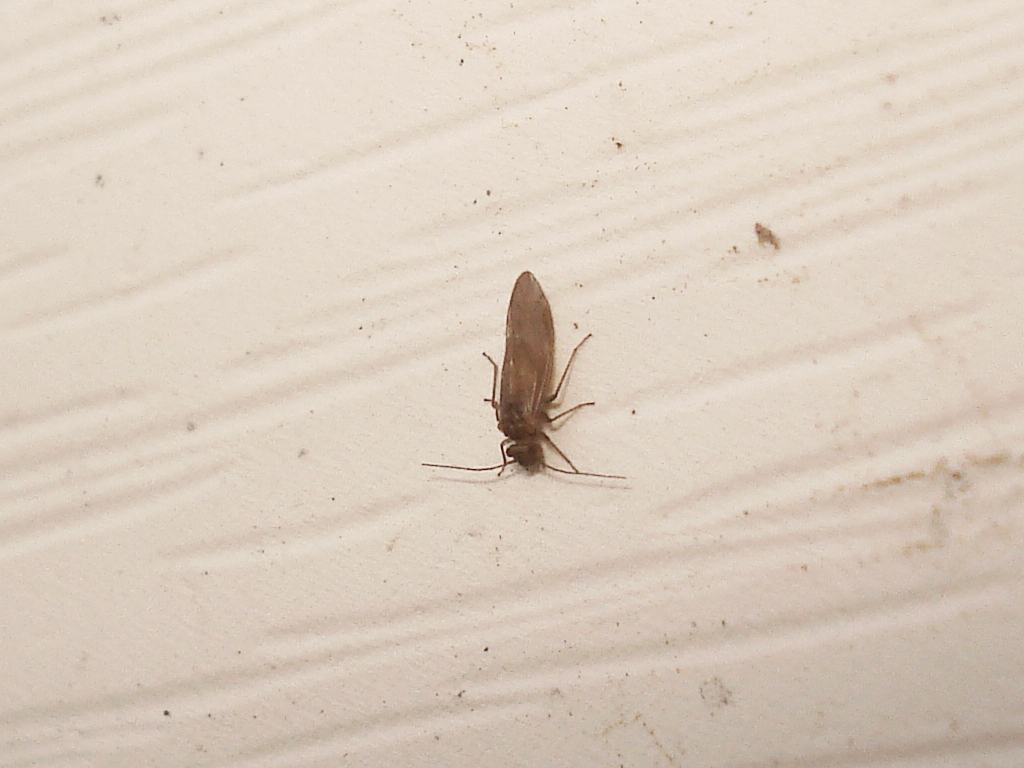

Scientific classification
- Domain: Eukaryota
- Kingdom: Animalia
- Phylum: Arthropoda
- Class: Insecta
- Order: Psocodea
- Family: Caeciliusidae
- Genus: Valenzuela
- Species: V. burmeisteri

Binomial name
- Valenzuela burmeisteri (Brauer, 1876)

= Valenzuela burmeisteri =

Species of booklouse

Valencia burmeisteri is a species of Psocoptera from the family Caeciliusidae that can be found in United Kingdom, and sometimes Ireland. They are also common in Austria, Belgium, Bulgaria, Canary Islands, Croatia, Denmark, Finland, France, Germany, Greece, Hungary, Italy, Latvia, Luxembourg, Madeira, Norway, Poland, Portugal, Romania, Spain, Sweden, Switzerland, and the Netherlands. It is also widespread in Near East. The species are yellowish-black coloured.

== Habitat ==
The species feeds on beech, cedar, Chinese juniper, fir, hawthorn, hemlock, juniper, larch, oak, pine, Sequoia, spruce and yew.
