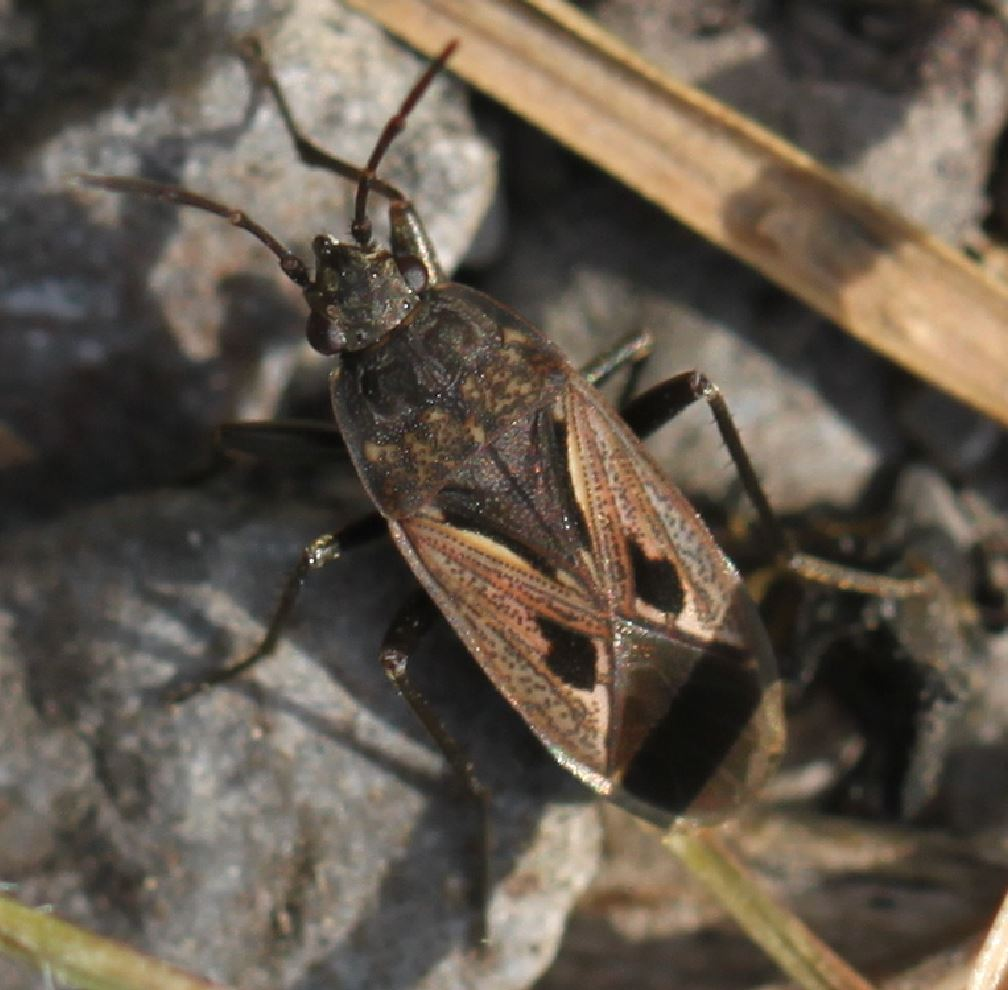
- Rhyparochromus pini

Scientific classification
- Kingdom: Animalia
- Phylum: Arthropoda
- Class: Insecta
- Order: Hemiptera
- Suborder: Heteroptera
- Family: Rhyparochromidae
- Subfamily: Rhyparochrominae
- Tribe: Rhyparochromini
- Genus: Rhyparochromus; Hahn, 1826

= Rhyparochromus =

Genus of true bugs

Rhyparochromus is a genus of dirt-colored seed bugs in the family Rhyparochromidae. There are more than 40 described species in Rhyparochromus.

== Species ==
These 41 species belong to the genus Rhyparochromus:

- Rhyparochromus adspersus (Mulsant & Rey, 1852)
- Rhyparochromus albomaculatus (Scott, 1874)
- Rhyparochromus arabicus Linnavuori, 1978
- Rhyparochromus armenicus Seidenstucker, 1963
- Rhyparochromus brevis (Lethierry, 1883)
- Rhyparochromus carbonarius (Rambur, 1839)
- Rhyparochromus celeripes (Kiritshenko, 1914)
- Rhyparochromus creticus Josifov, 1963
- Rhyparochromus csikii (Horvath, 1901)
- Rhyparochromus dimidiatus Curtis, 1836
- Rhyparochromus douglasi (Fieber, 1864)
- Rhyparochromus geniculatus (Signoret, 1860)
- Rhyparochromus ibericus Baerensprung, 1858
- Rhyparochromus japonicus (Stal, 1874)
- Rhyparochromus kangricus (Kirkaldy, 1907)
- Rhyparochromus leucodermus Fieber, 1861
- Rhyparochromus melanopus Kiritshenko & Scudder, 1973
- Rhyparochromus minusculus (Reuter, 1885)
- Rhyparochromus nigellatus (Lindberg, 1932)
- Rhyparochromus nigritus Seidenstucker, 1963
- Rhyparochromus nigroruber Stal, 1858
- Rhyparochromus nuristanicus (Kiritshenko, 1938)
- Rhyparochromus omissus (Horvath, 1911)
- Rhyparochromus pallidicornis (Reuter, 1891)
- Rhyparochromus persicellus (Kirkaldy, 1909)
- Rhyparochromus phoeniceus (Rossi, 1794)
- Rhyparochromus pini Linnaeus, 1758
- Rhyparochromus quadratus (Fabricius, 1798)
- Rhyparochromus raptorius Signoret, 1860
- Rhyparochromus sabulicola Linnavuori, 1989
- Rhyparochromus saturnius Rossi, 1790
- Rhyparochromus seidenstuckeri Slater, 1964
- Rhyparochromus semidolens Walker, 1870
- Rhyparochromus sogdianus (Kiritshenko, 1914)
- Rhyparochromus taleus Lucas *, 1846
- Rhyparochromus turanicus (Wagner, 1961)
- Rhyparochromus vallonius (Lindberg, 1935)
- Rhyparochromus vittiger Kiritshenko & Scudder, 1973
- Rhyparochromus vallonius (Lindberg, 1935)
- (Rhyparochromus vulgaris (Lindberg, 1935)) - Raglius vulgaris
- Rhyparochromus walkeri (Saunders, 1876)
- † Rhyparochromus terreus Scudder *, 1878
- † Rhyparochromus verrilli Scudder, 1890
