= Hemineura (insect) =

Scientific classification
- Domain: Eukaryota
- Kingdom: Animalia
- Phylum: Arthropoda
- Class: Insecta
- Order: Psocodea
- Family: Elipsocidae
- Genus: Hemineura; Tetens, 1891

Genus of insects

Hemineura is a genus of insects belonging to the family Elipsocidae.

The species of this genus are found in Europe and Northern America.

Species:

- Hemineura bigoti Badonnel, 1970
- Hemineura blascoi Baz, 1994
