= Enzio Reuter =

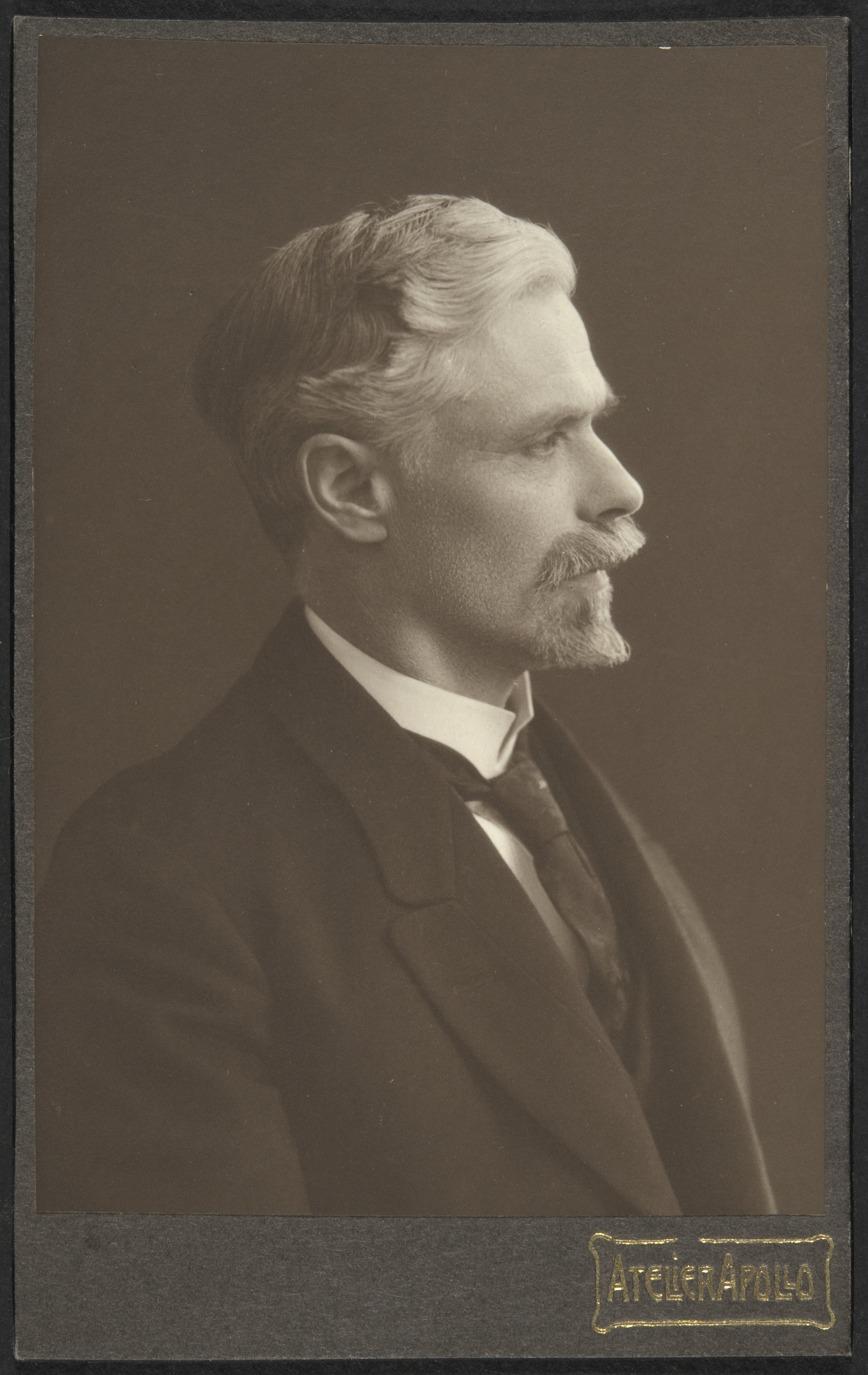
Enzio Reuter.

Enzio Rafael Reuter (30 March 1867, in Turku – 11 February 1951, in Helsinki) was a Finnish entomologist who specialised in Lepidoptera.

He wrote Über die Palpen der Rhopalocera: Ein Beitrag zur Erkenntnis der verwandtschaftlichen Beziehungen unter den Tagfaltern, an important work on the classification of lepidoptera in which some higher level taxa are erected.

Reuter was a cytologist and student of phylogenetics. His collection is conserved in the Natural History Museum of Helsinki.

Reuter was a correspondent with and admirer of the German Darwinist Ernst Haeckel:

"In 1868 Haeckel had given his first edition of the natural history of creation and this work, more than any other, made Darwinism to a generally accepted world view… Reuter’s dissertation carries a label of its time. It is a typical phylogenetic handling, inspired by Haeckel’s spirit that at the close of the century totally dominated the biological research."

== Literature ==
- Federley, H. 1951. Enzio Rafael Reuter. Memoranda Soc. Fauna Flora Fennica, 27: 170–180.
- Howard, L. O. 1930. History of applied Entomology (Somewhat Anecdotal). Smiths. Miscell. Coll. 84 X+1–564.
- Osborn, H. 1952. A Brief History of Entomology Including Time of Demosthenes and Aristotle to Modern Times with over Five Hundred Portraits. Columbus, Ohio, The Spahr & Glenn Company. Pp. 1–303.
- Silfverberg, H. 1995. [Reuter, E.] Memoranda Societatis pro Fauna et Flora Fennica 71:39–49.

== Psocoptera ==
- Pseudopsocus fusciceps, described in 1893
