= Reuterella =

Scientific classification
- Domain: Eukaryota
- Kingdom: Animalia
- Phylum: Arthropoda
- Class: Insecta
- Order: Psocodea
- Family: Elipsocidae
- Genus: Reuterella; Enderlein, 1903

Genus of booklice

Reuterella is a genus of damp barklice in the family Elipsocidae. There is at least one described species in Reuterella, R. helvimacula.
