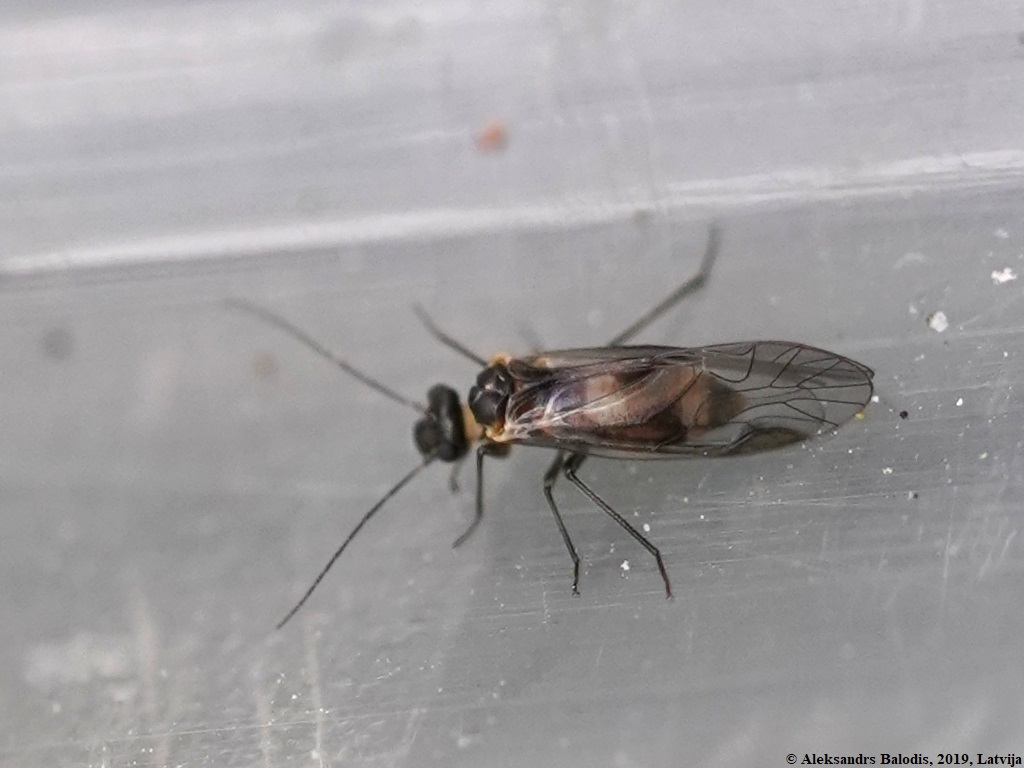
- Elipsocus hyalinus

Scientific classification
- Kingdom: Animalia
- Phylum: Arthropoda
- Clade: Pancrustacea
- Class: Insecta
- Order: Psocodea
- Suborder: Psocomorpha
- Infraorder: Homilopsocidea
- Family: Elipsocidae

Subfamilies
- Elipsocinae; Pseudopsocinae; Propsocinae; Nepiomorphinae; Lesneiinae; Yuntapsocinae

= Elipsocidae =

Family of booklice

Elipsocidae is a family of Psocodea (formerly Psocoptera) belonging to the infraorder Homilopsocidea. Members of the family have a free areola postica. Many species are apterous (without wings). The family includes about 130 species in more than 30 genera.

== Genera ==
These 32 genera belong to the family Elipsocidae:

- Antarctopsocus^{c g}
- Ausysium^{c g}
- Clinopsocus^{c g}
- Cuneopalpus Badonnel, 1943^{i c g b}
- Diademadrilus^{c g}
- Drymopsocus Smithers, 1963^{c g}
- Elipsocus Hagen, 1866^{i c g b}
- Euryphallus^{c g}
- Gondwanapsocus^{c g}
- Hemineura^{c g}
- Kilauella^{c g}
- Metelipsocus^{c g}
- Nepiomorpha Pearman, 1936^{i c g}
- Nothopsocus^{c g}
- Onychophallus^{c g}
- Paedomorpha^{c g}
- Palistreptus^{c g}
- Palmicola Mockford, 1955^{i c g}
- Pentacladus^{c g}
- Prionotodrilus^{c g}
- Propsocus McLachlan, 1866^{i c g b}
- Pseudopsocus^{c g}
- Psocophloea^{c g}
- Reuterella Enderlein, 1903^{i c g b}
- Roesleria^{c g}
- Sandrapsocus^{c g}
- Sinelipsocus^{c g}
- Spilopsocus^{c g}
- Telmopsocus^{c g}
- Villopsocus^{c g}
- Weddellopsocus^{c g}
- Yuntapsocus^{c g}

Data sources: i = ITIS, c = Catalogue of Life, g = GBIF, b = Bugguide.net

== Sources ==
- Lienhard, C. & Smithers, C. N. 2002. Psocoptera (Insecta): World Catalogue and Bibliography. Instrumenta Biodiversitatis, vol. 5. Muséum d'histoire naturelle, Genève.
