= Caeciliusinae =

Scientific classification
- Domain: Eukaryota
- Kingdom: Animalia
- Phylum: Arthropoda
- Class: Insecta
- Order: Psocodea
- Family: Caeciliusidae
- Subfamily: Caeciliusinae; Mockford, 2000

Tribes
- See text

Subfamily of booklouse

Caeciliusinae is a subfamily of Psocoptera from the Caeciliusidae family.

== Tribes ==
- Austrocaeciliini Yoshizawa, 2001
- Bassocaeciliini Schmidt & New, 2008
- Caeciliusini Mockford, 2000
- Coryphacini Mockford, 2000
- Epicaeciliini Mockford, 2000
- Maoripsocini Mockford, 2000
