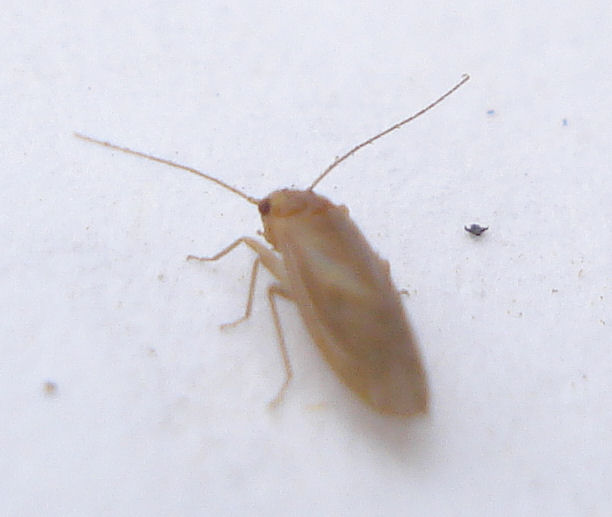
- Valenzuela burmeisteri

Scientific classification
- Kingdom: Animalia
- Phylum: Arthropoda
- Clade: Pancrustacea
- Class: Insecta
- Order: Psocodea
- Family: Caeciliusidae
- Subfamily: Caeciliusinae
- Genus: Valenzuela (Navas, 1924)

Diversity
- At least 300 species

= Valenzuela (insect) =

Valenzuela Temporal range: 47.8–present Ma

Genus of barklice

Valenzuela is a genus of psocoptera in the family Caeciliusidae, the lizard barklice. Some species are extinct and date to the Eocene of Poland or Russia. There are at least 300 described species in Valenzuela.

== See also ==
- List of Valenzuela species
