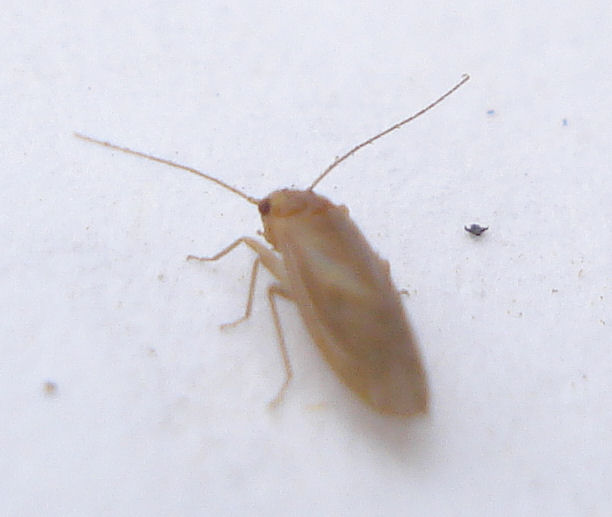
- Valenzuela burmeisteri

Scientific classification
- Kingdom: Animalia
- Phylum: Arthropoda
- Clade: Pancrustacea
- Class: Insecta
- Order: Psocodea
- Suborder: Psocomorpha
- Infraorder: Caeciliusetae
- Family: Caeciliusidae; Mockford, 2000

Subfamilies
- Caeciliusinae; Aphyopsocinae; Fuelleborniellinae

= Caeciliusidae =

Family of booklice

Caeciliusidae is a family of Psocodea (formerly Psocoptera) belonging to the suborder Psocomorpha. The family was once named Caeciliidae, but the latter name was changed because of homonymy with the amphibian family Caeciliidae. The subfamily Paracaeciliinae was formerly in Caeciliusidae, but it has been elevated to family rank, Paracaeciliidae.

There are at least 40 genera and 650 described species in Caeciliusidae.

== Genera ==
These 40 genera belong to the family Caeciliusidae:

- Amphicaecilius Li, 2002
- Anoculaticaeca Li, 1997
- Aphyopsocus Smithers, 1982
- Asiocaecilius Mockford, 2000
- Austrocaecilius Smithers, 1981
- Bassocaecilius Schmidt & New, 2008
- Bivalvicaecilia Li, 2002
- Caecilius Curtis, 1837
- Clinocaecilius Schmidt & New, 2008
- Coryphaca Enderlein, 1910
- Coryphosmila Enderlein, 1925
- Disialacaecilia Li, 2002
- Dypsocopsis Mockford, 2000
- Dypsocus Hagen, 1866
- Epicaecilius Mockford, 2000
- Fuelleborniella Enderlein, 1902
- Graminacaecilius Schmidt & New, 2008
- Hageniola Banks, 1931
- Isophanes Banks, 1937
- Isophanopsis Badonnel, 1981
- Licaecilius Li, 2002
- Lienhardiella Mockford, 2000
- Maoripsocopsis Mockford, 2000
- Maoripsocus Tillyard, 1923
- Nothocaecilius Schmidt & New, 2008
- Orocaecilius Mockford, 2000
- Parvialacaecilia Li, 2002
- Pericaecilius Mockford, 2000
- Phymocaecilius Li, 2002
- Protodypsocus Enderlein, 1903
- Smithersiella Badonnel, 1977
- Stenocaecilius Mockford, 2000
- Tasmanocaecilius Schmidt & New, 2008
- Thorntoniella Mockford, 2000
- Valenzuela Navas, 1924
- Ypsiloneura Pearman, 1932
- † Eopsocites Hong, 2002
- † Fushunopsocus Hong, 2002
- † Ptenolasia Enderlein, 1911
- † Stenopterites Hong, 2002

== Sources ==
- Lienhard, C. & Smithers, C. N. 2002. Psocoptera (Insecta): World Catalogue and Bibliography. Instrumenta Biodiversitatis, vol. 5. Muséum d'histoire naturelle, Genève.
