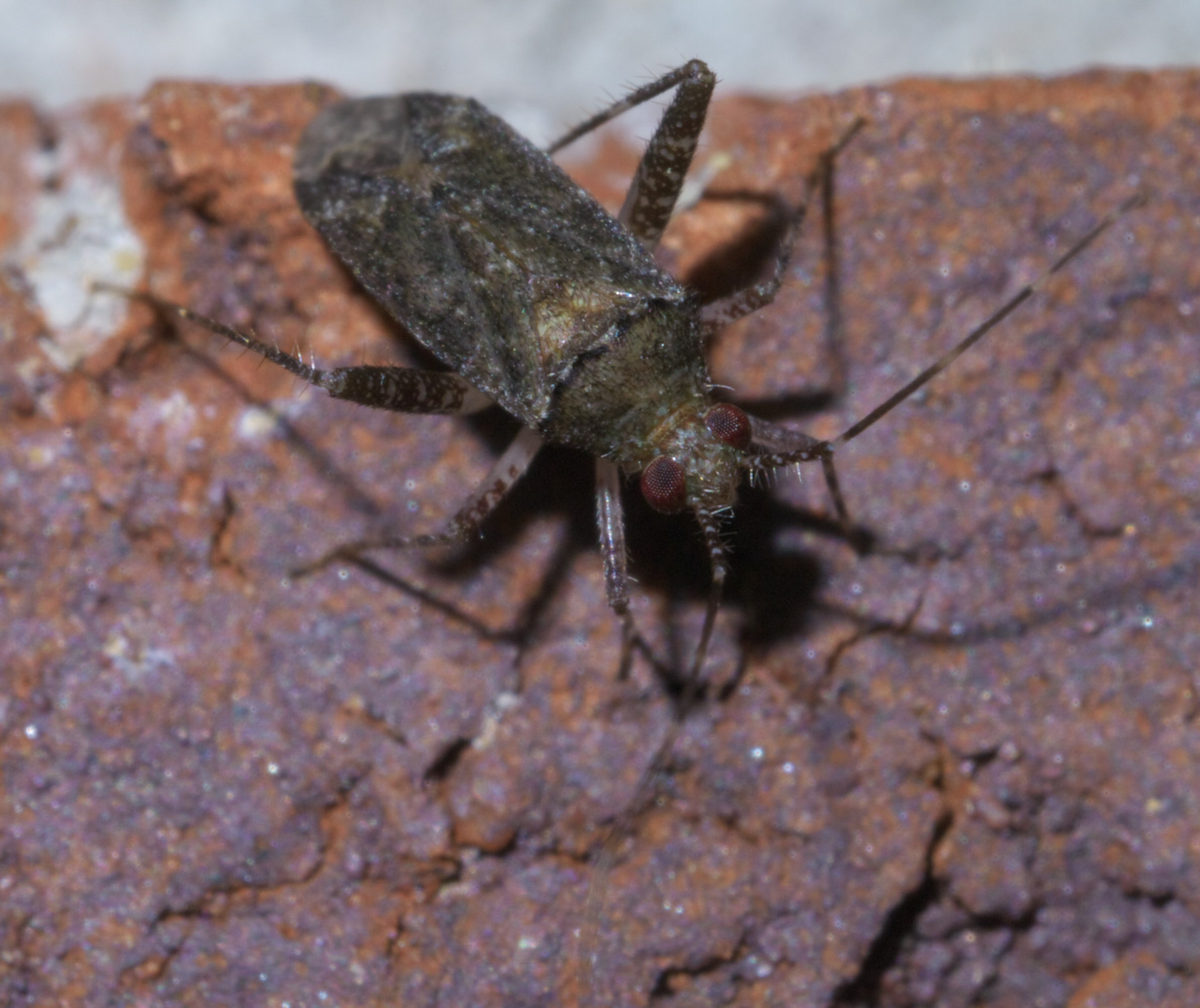

Scientific classification
- Kingdom: Animalia
- Phylum: Arthropoda
- Class: Insecta
- Order: Hemiptera
- Suborder: Heteroptera
- Family: Miridae
- Tribe: Mirini
- Genus: Phytocoris
- Species: P. conspurcatus

Binomial name
- Phytocoris conspurcatus Knight, 1920

= Phytocoris conspurcatus =

Species of true bug

Phytocoris conspurcatus is a species of plant bug in the family Miridae. It is found in North America.

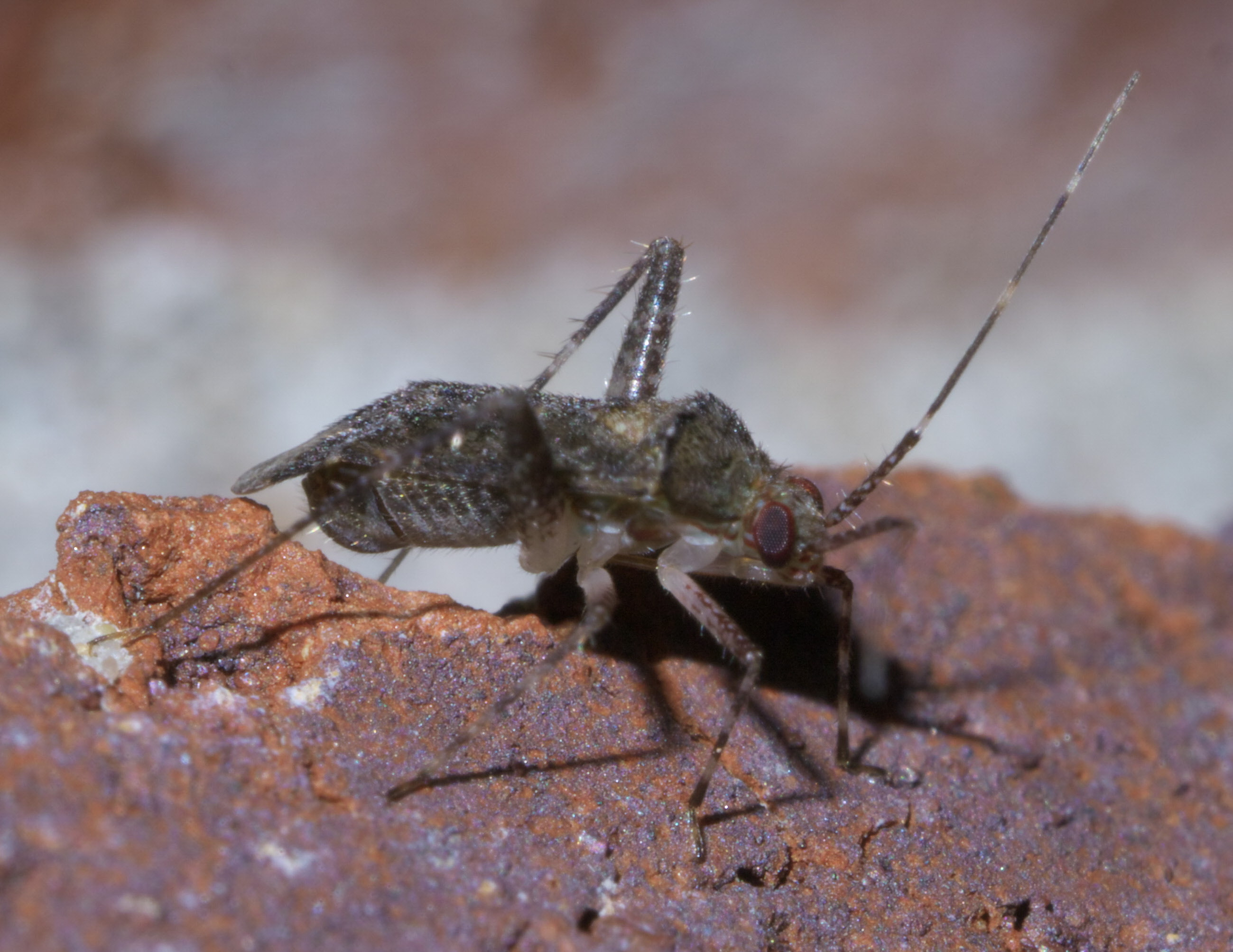

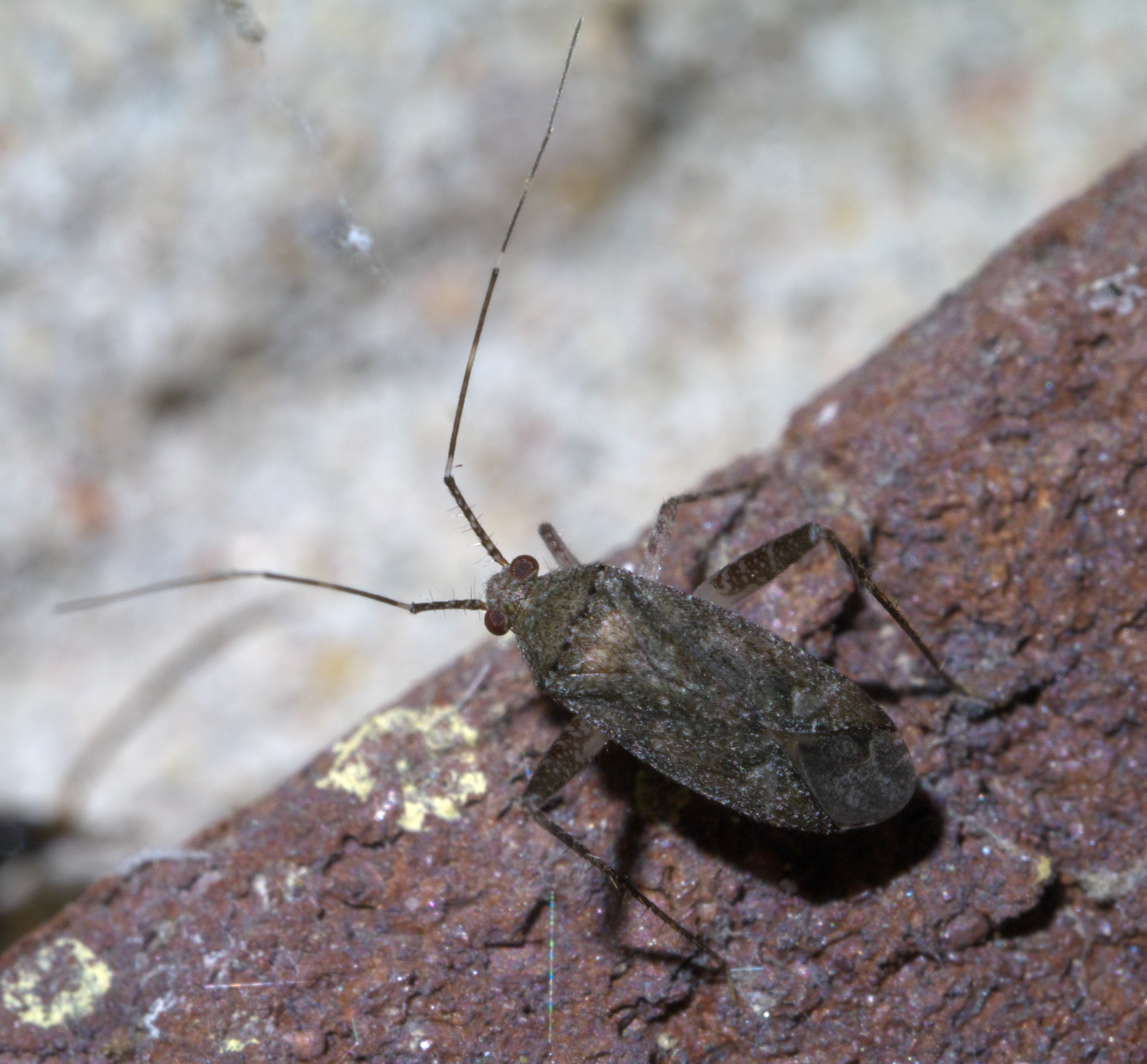
