= Phytocoris ventralis =

Scientific classification
- Kingdom: Animalia
- Phylum: Arthropoda
- Class: Insecta
- Order: Hemiptera
- Suborder: Heteroptera
- Family: Miridae
- Genus: Phytocoris
- Species: P. ventralis

Binomial name
- Phytocoris ventralis Van Duzee, 1912

Synonyms
- Phytocoris contrastus Knight, 1920; Phytocoris ephedrae Knight, 1961; Phytocoris quadricinctus Knight, 1968

Species of true bug

Phytocoris ventralis is a species of plant bug in the family Miridae. It is found in North America.
