= Phytocoris pallidicornis =

Scientific classification
- Kingdom: Animalia
- Phylum: Arthropoda
- Class: Insecta
- Order: Hemiptera
- Suborder: Heteroptera
- Family: Miridae
- Tribe: Mirini
- Genus: Phytocoris
- Species: P. pallidicornis

Binomial name
- Phytocoris pallidicornis Reuter, 1876

Species of true bug

Phytocoris pallidicornis is a species of plant bug in the family Miridae. It is found in North America.
