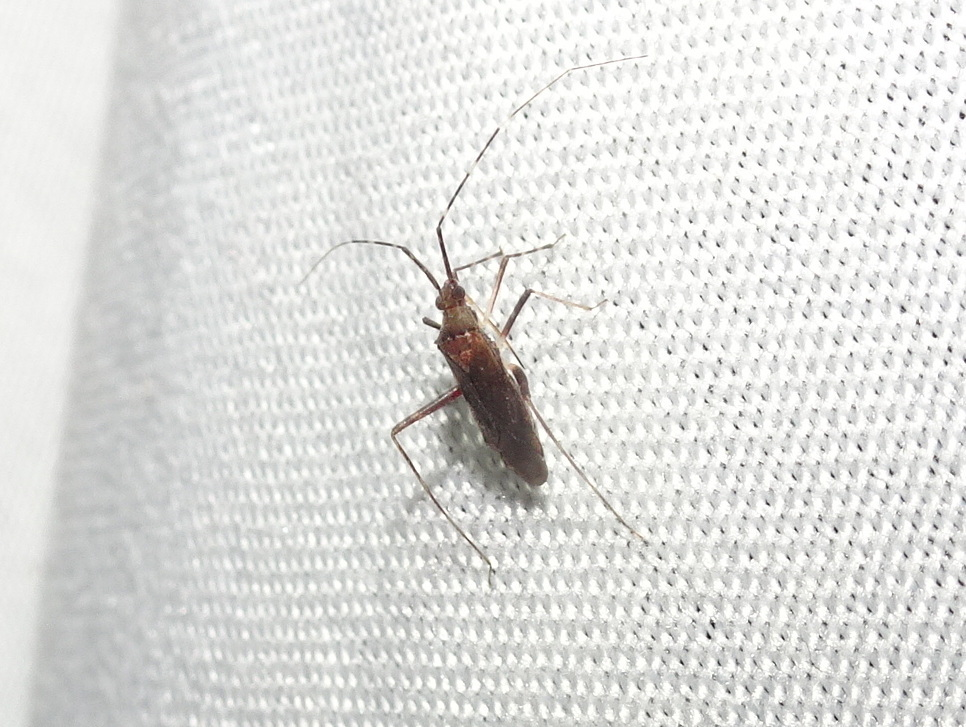
- Phytocoris antennalis, Kansas

Scientific classification
- Kingdom: Animalia
- Phylum: Arthropoda
- Class: Insecta
- Order: Hemiptera
- Suborder: Heteroptera
- Family: Miridae
- Genus: Phytocoris
- Species: P. antennalis

Binomial name
- Phytocoris antennalis Reuter 1909

= Phytocoris antennalis =

Species of true bug

Phytocoris antennalis is a species in the family Miridae ("plant bugs"), in the order Hemiptera ("true bugs, cicadas, hoppers, aphids and allies"). It is found in North America.
