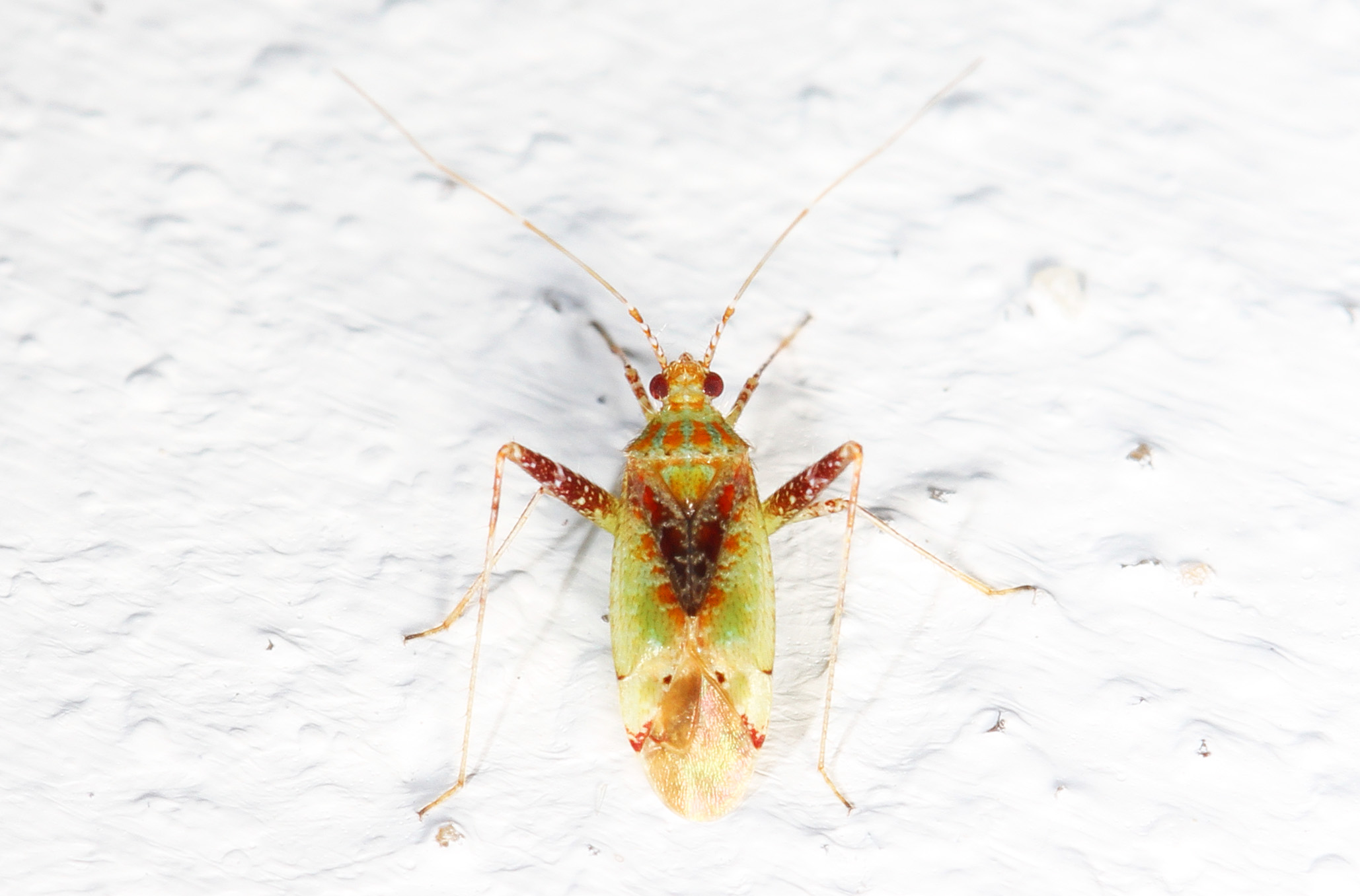

Scientific classification
- Kingdom: Animalia
- Phylum: Arthropoda
- Class: Insecta
- Order: Hemiptera
- Suborder: Heteroptera
- Family: Miridae
- Tribe: Mirini
- Genus: Phytocoris
- Species: P. tibialis

Binomial name
- Phytocoris tibialis Reuter, 1876

= Phytocoris tibialis =

Species of true bug

Phytocoris tibialis is a species of plant bug in the family Miridae. It is found in the Caribbean Sea, Central America, and North America.
