= Phytocoris fenestratus =

Scientific classification
- Kingdom: Animalia
- Phylum: Arthropoda
- Class: Insecta
- Order: Hemiptera
- Suborder: Heteroptera
- Family: Miridae
- Genus: Phytocoris
- Species: P. fenestratus

Binomial name
- Phytocoris fenestratus Reuter, 1909

Species of true bug

Phytocoris fenestratus is a species of plant bugs in the family Miridae. It is found in North America.
