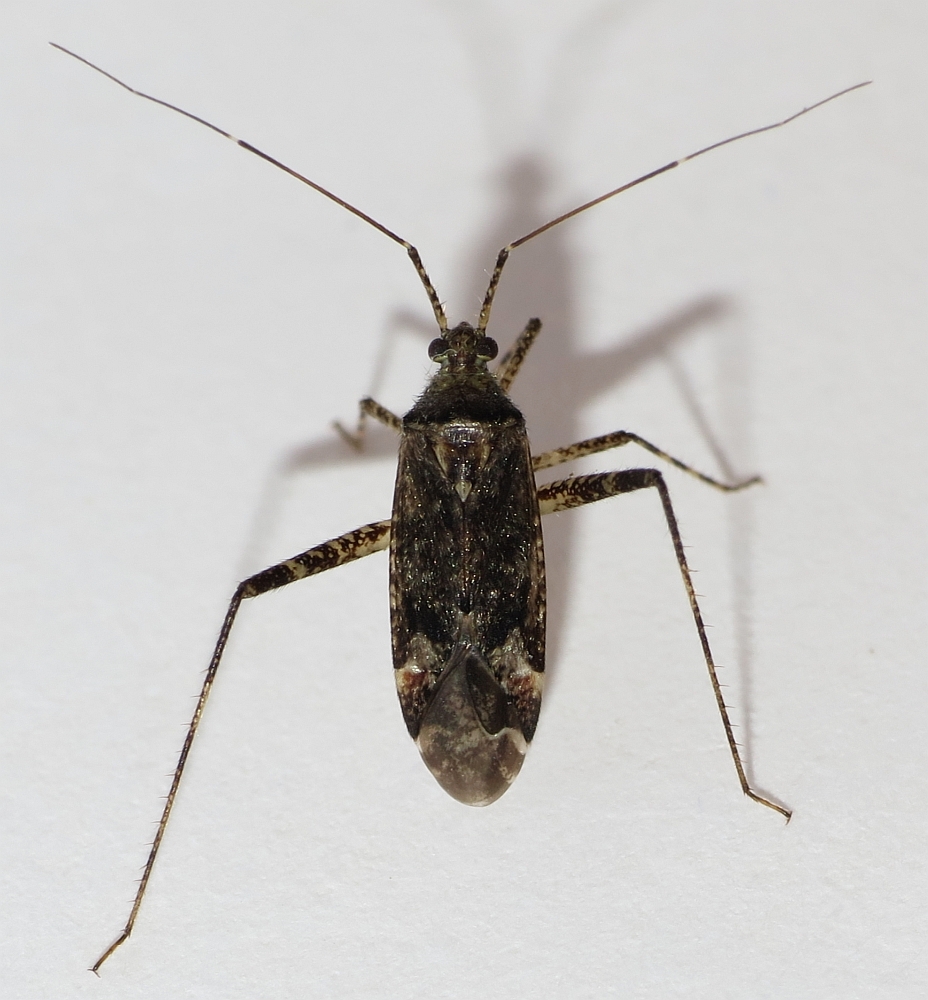

Scientific classification
- Kingdom: Animalia
- Phylum: Arthropoda
- Class: Insecta
- Order: Hemiptera
- Suborder: Heteroptera
- Family: Miridae
- Genus: Phytocoris
- Species: P. intricatus

Binomial name
- Phytocoris intricatus Flor, 1861

= Phytocoris intricatus =

Species of true bug

Phytocoris intricatus is a species of plant bugs belonging to the family Miridae, subfamily Mirinae. It can be found in Austria, the Baltic states, Belarus, Benelux, Czech Republic, France, Germany, Hungary, Liechtenstein, Poland, Russia, Switzerland, and Scandinavia.
