= Phytocoris eurekae =

Scientific classification
- Kingdom: Animalia
- Phylum: Arthropoda
- Class: Insecta
- Order: Hemiptera
- Suborder: Heteroptera
- Family: Miridae
- Genus: Phytocoris
- Species: P. eurekae

Binomial name
- Phytocoris eurekae Bliven, 1966

Species of plant bug

Phytocoris eurekae is a species of plant bug in the family Miridae. It is found in North America.
