= Phytocoris yollabollae =

Scientific classification
- Kingdom: Animalia
- Phylum: Arthropoda
- Class: Insecta
- Order: Hemiptera
- Suborder: Heteroptera
- Family: Miridae
- Tribe: Mirini
- Genus: Phytocoris
- Species: P. yollabollae

Binomial name
- Phytocoris yollabollae Bliven, 1956

Synonyms
- Phytocoris albiclavus Knight, 1974; Phytocoris montanae Knight, 1974; Phytocoris taos Knight, 1974

Species of true bug

Phytocoris yollabollae is a species of plant bug in the family Miridae. It is found in North America.
