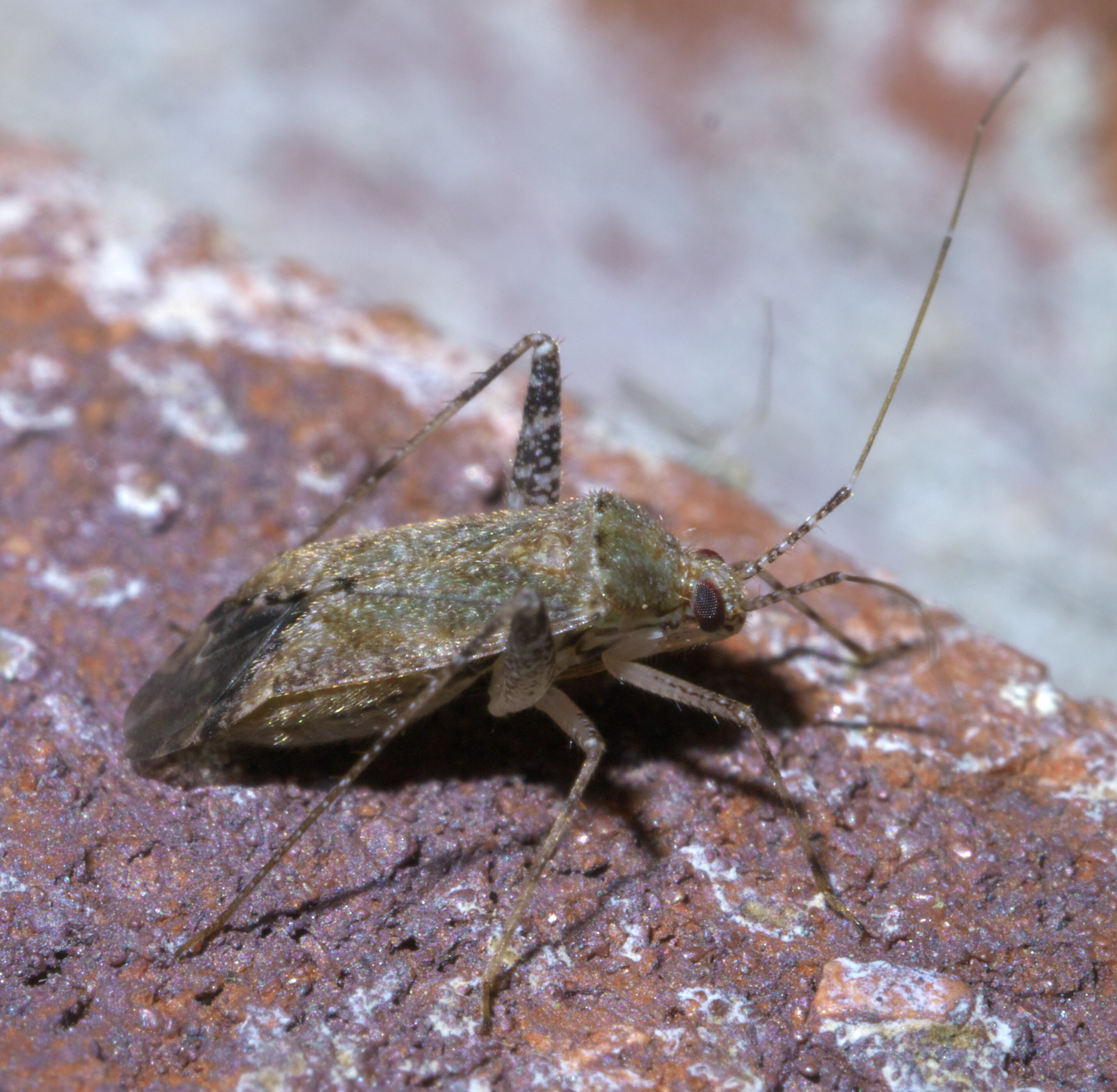

Scientific classification
- Kingdom: Animalia
- Phylum: Arthropoda
- Class: Insecta
- Order: Hemiptera
- Suborder: Heteroptera
- Family: Miridae
- Subfamily: Mirinae
- Tribe: Mirini
- Genus: Phytocoris; Fallén, 1814

Diversity
- more than 700 species

Synonyms
- Callodemas Uhler, 1895; Compsocerocoris Reuter, 1875; Dionyza Distant, 1892; Ecertobia Reuter, 1909; Palacocoris Kirkaldy, 1906; Pallacocoris Reuter, 1876; Phytocorisa Laporte, 1832

= Phytocoris =

Genus of true bugs

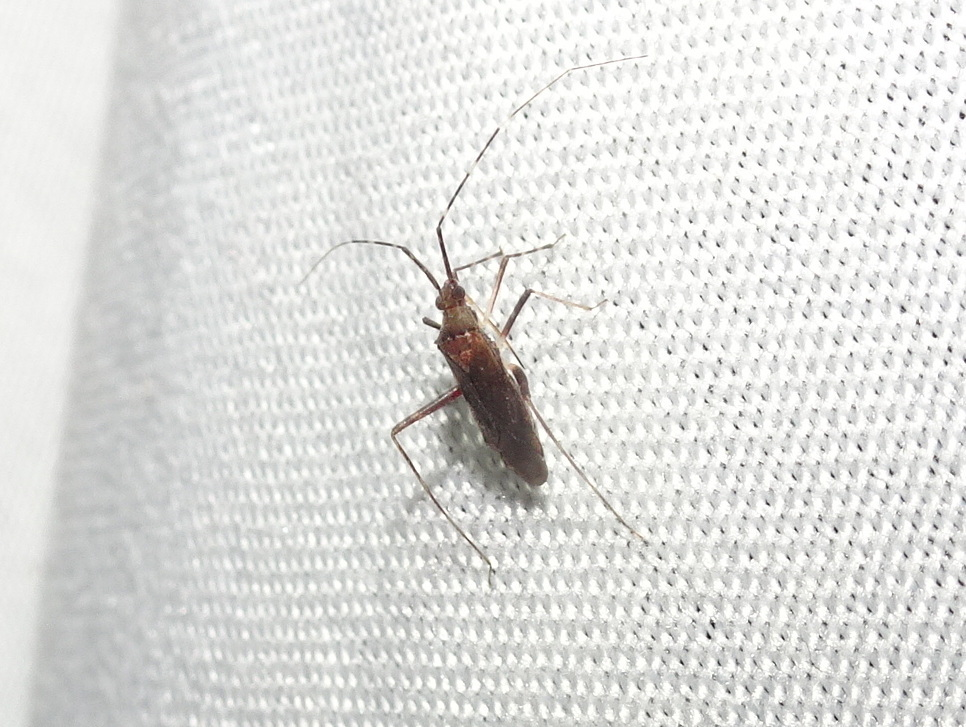
Phytocoris antennalis, Kansas

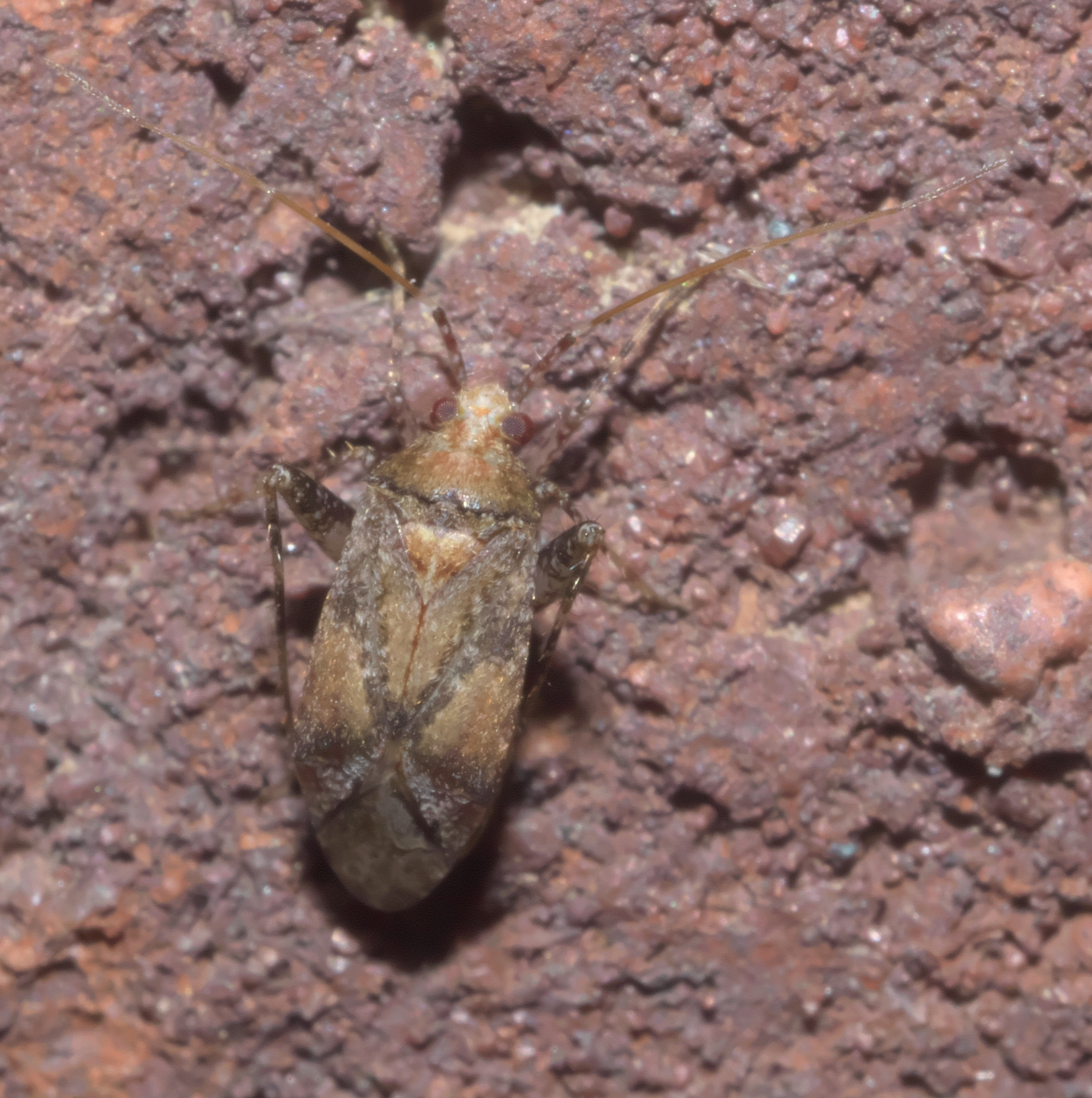
Phytocoris breviusculus, Oklahoma

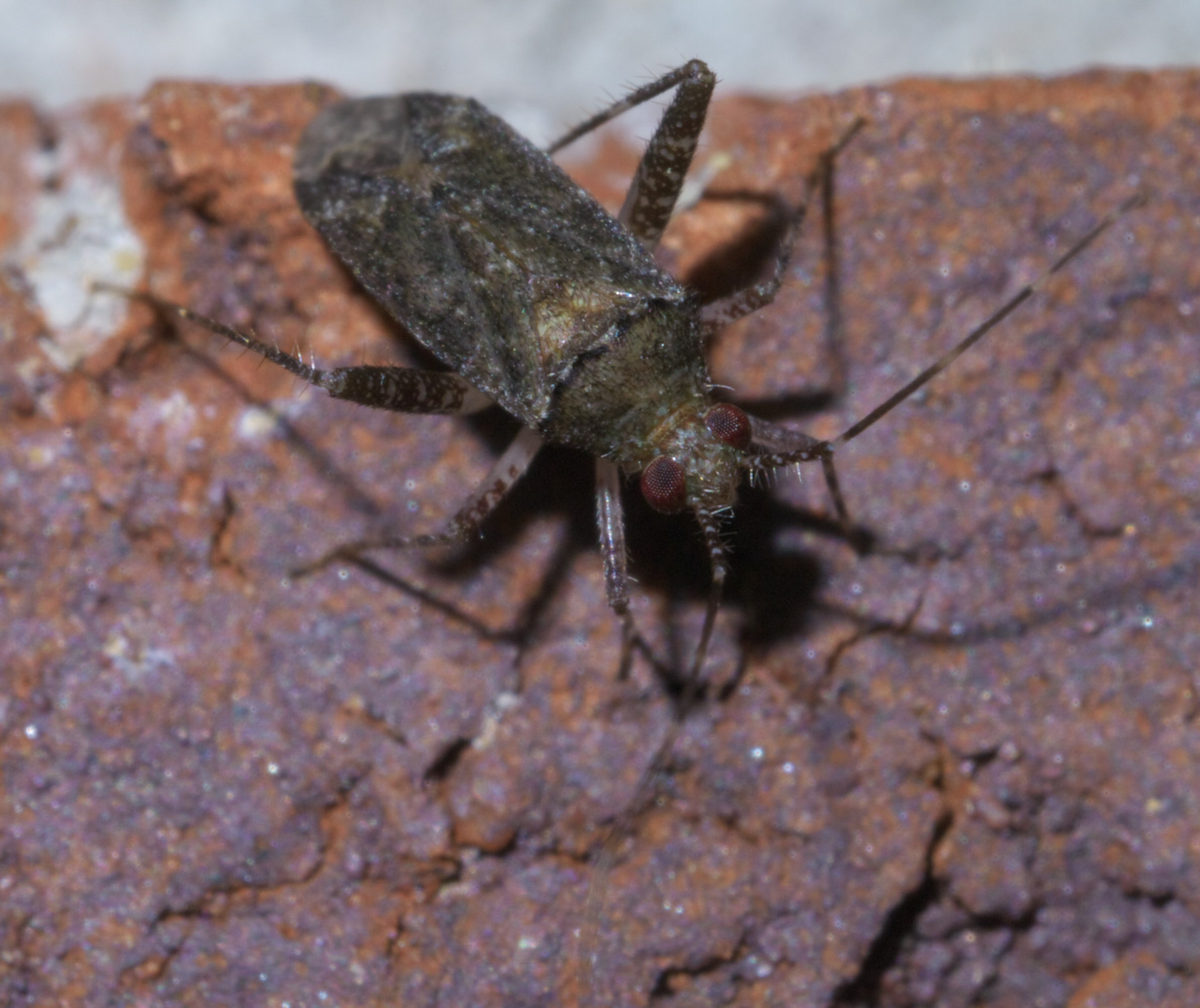
Phytocoris conspurcatus, Oklahoma

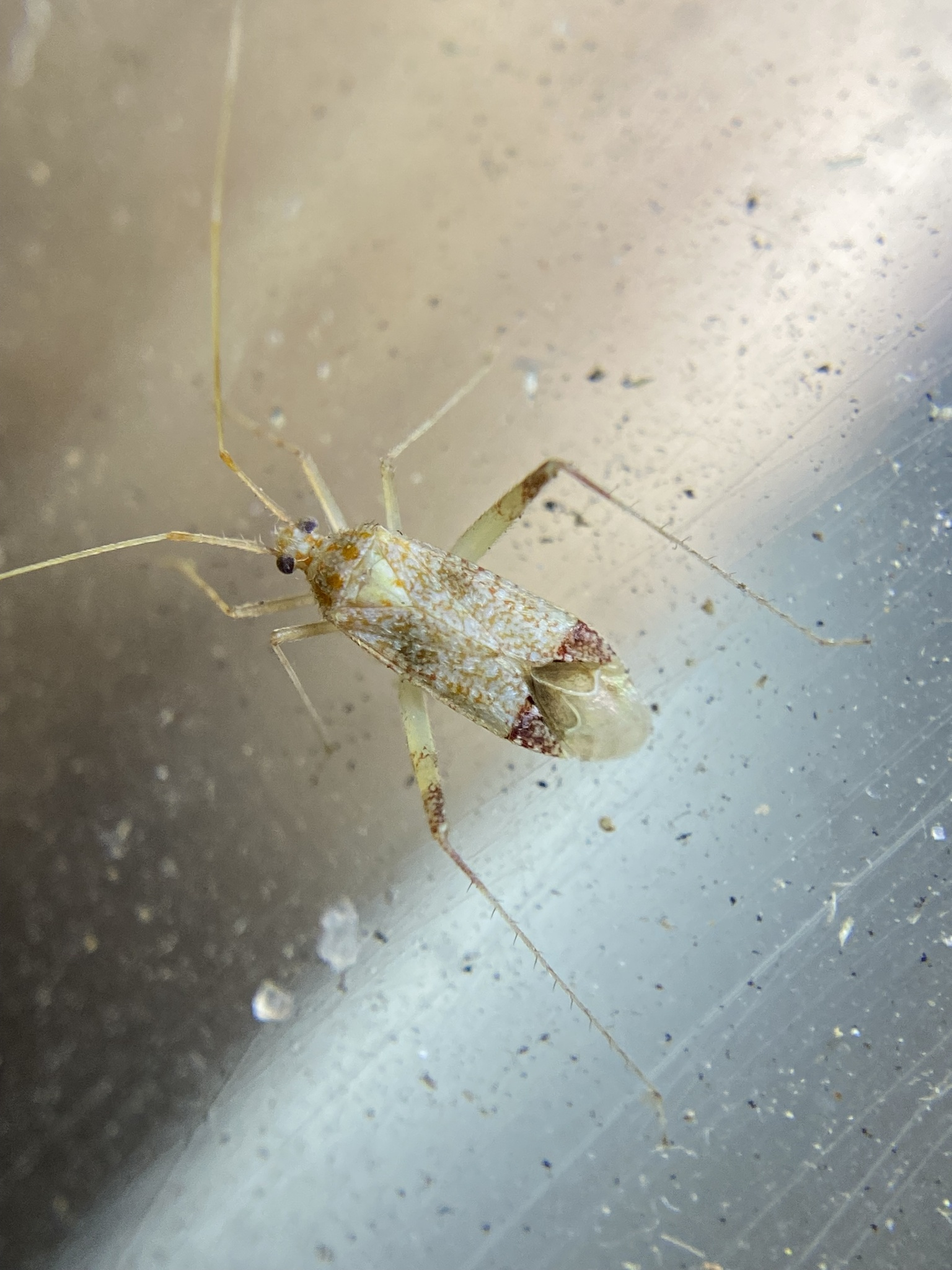
Phytocoris depictus, New York

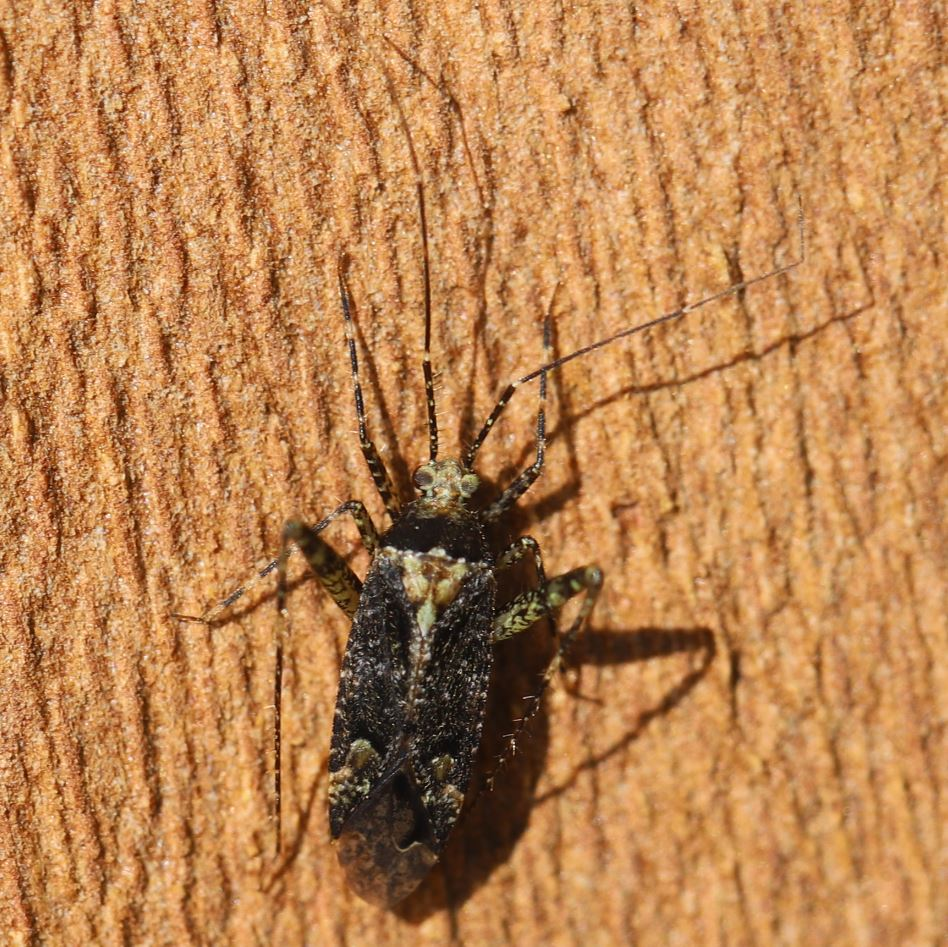
Phytocoris dimidiatus

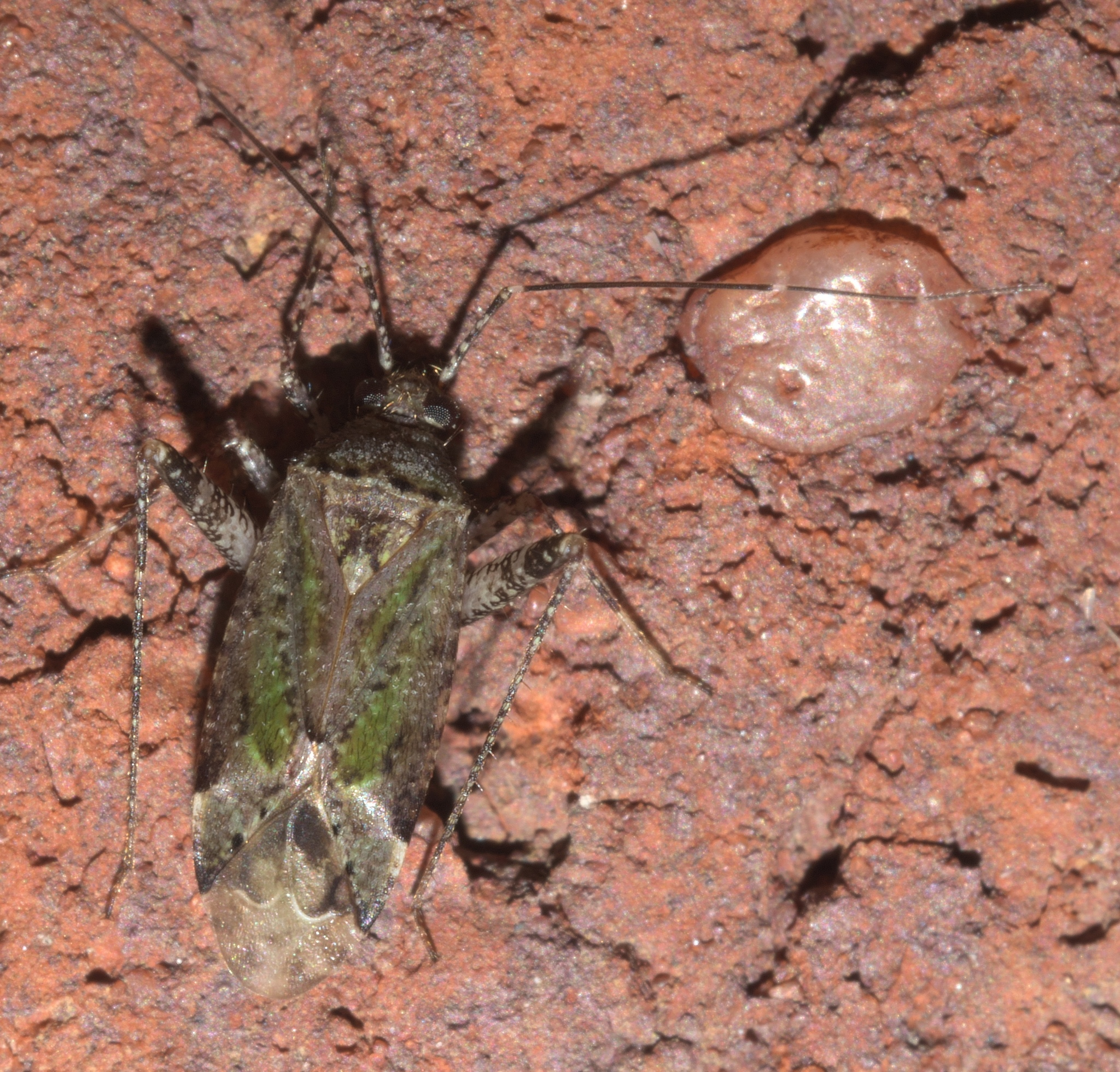
Phytocoris eximius, Oklahoma

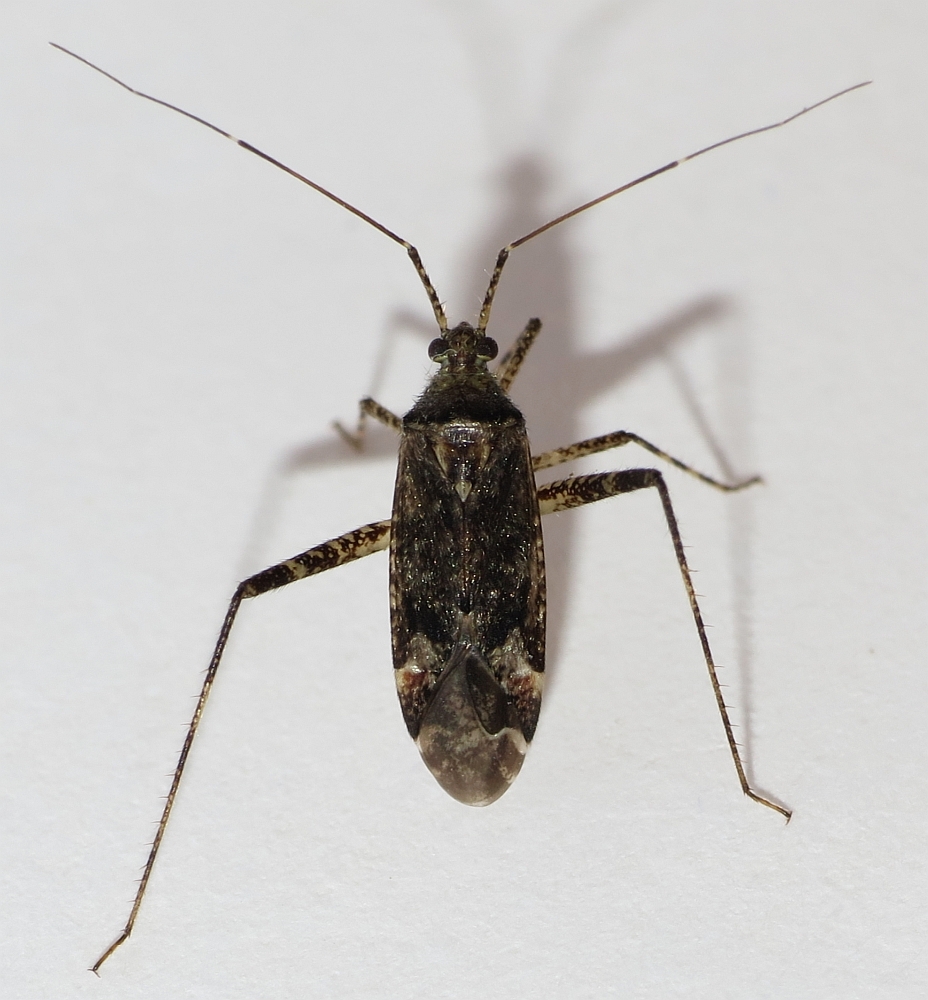
Phytocoris intricatus, Finland

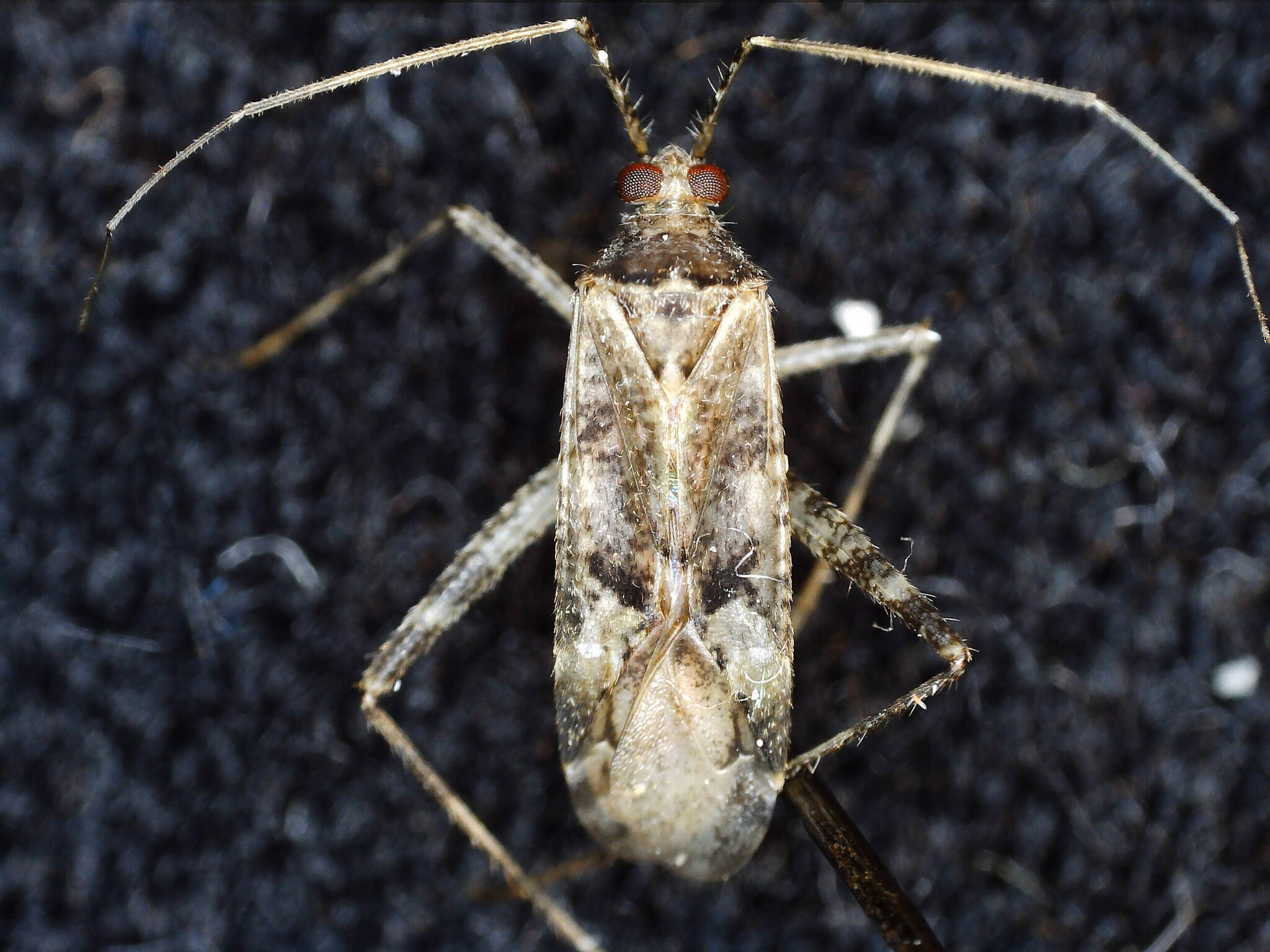
Phytocoris longipennis, Oklahoma

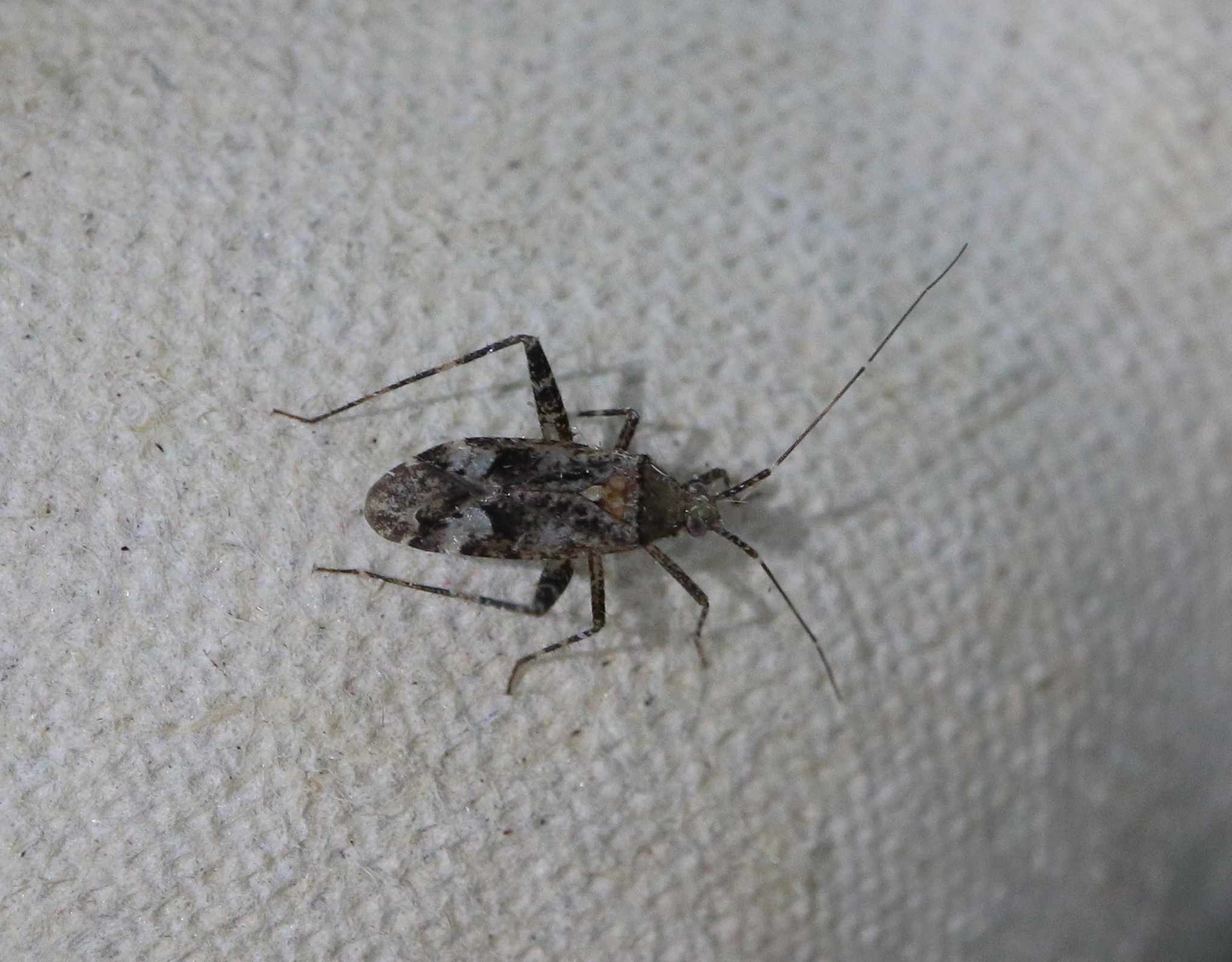
Phytocoris pini, Suomi / Finland

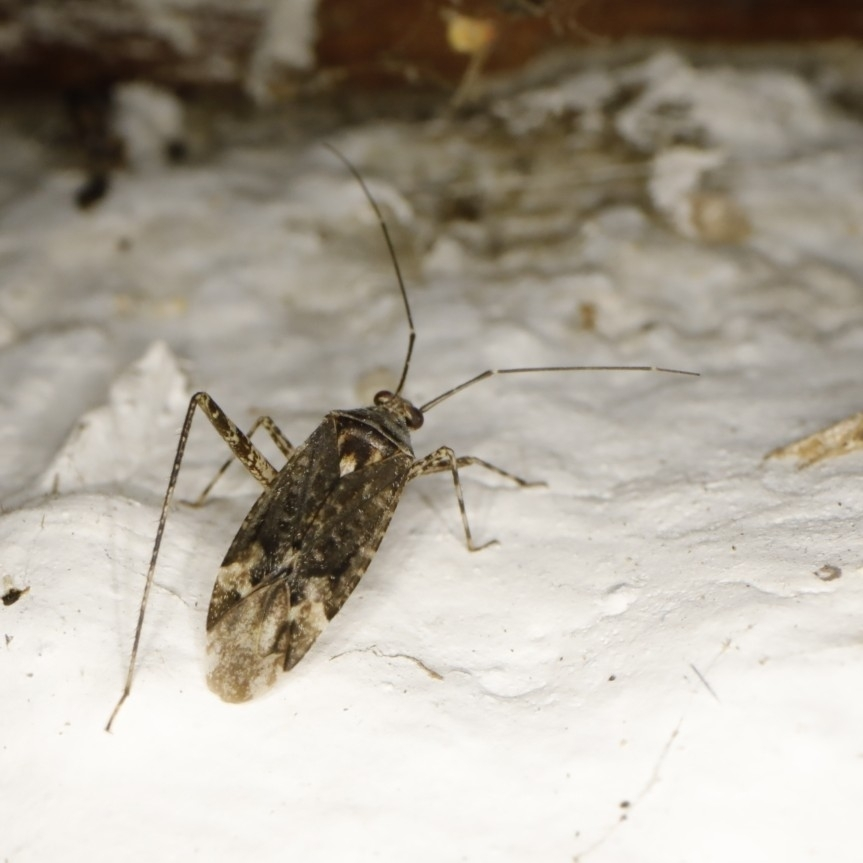
Phytocoris populi, Suomi / Finland

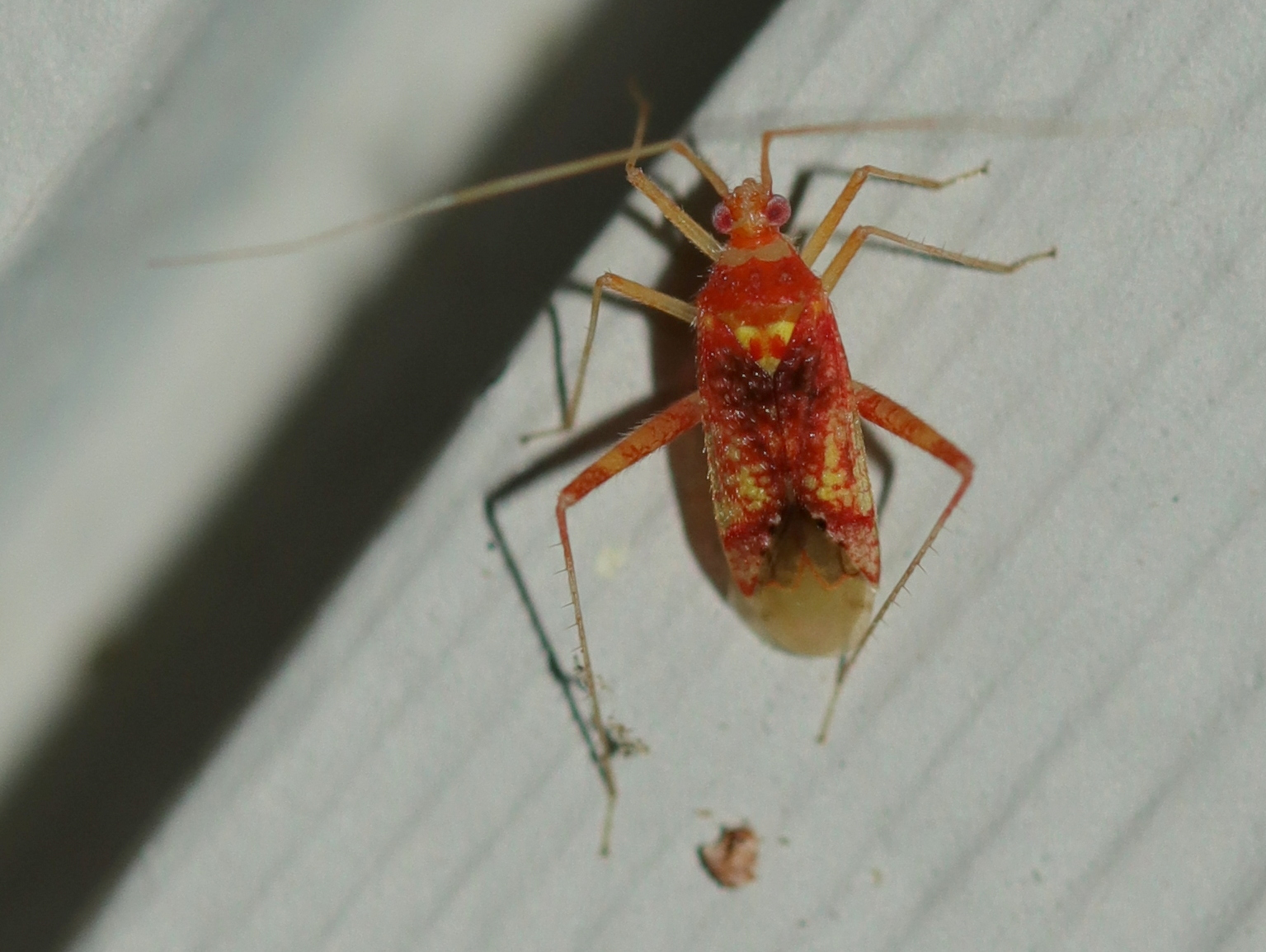
Phytocoris puella, Massachusetts

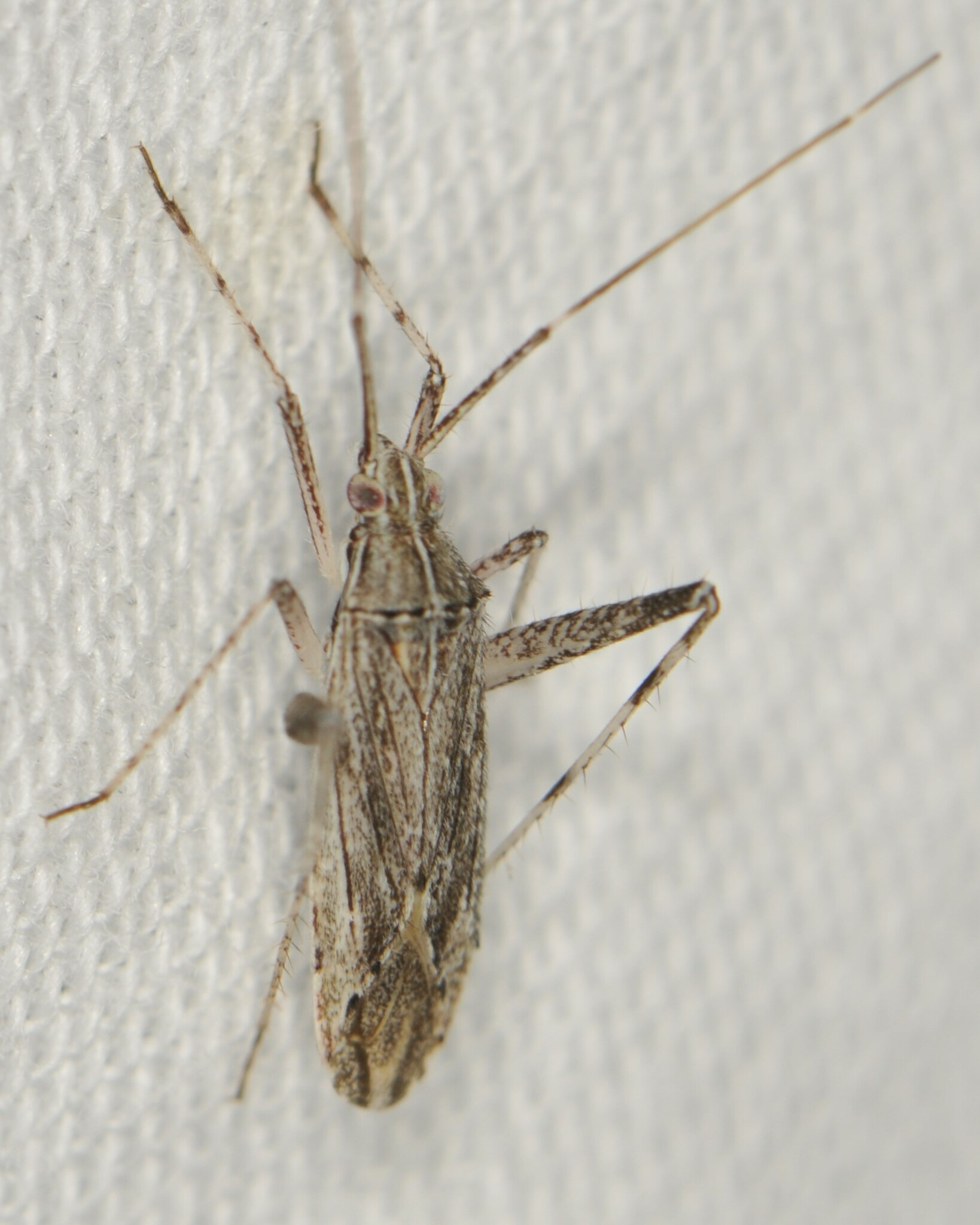
Phytocoris pulchricollis, New Mexico

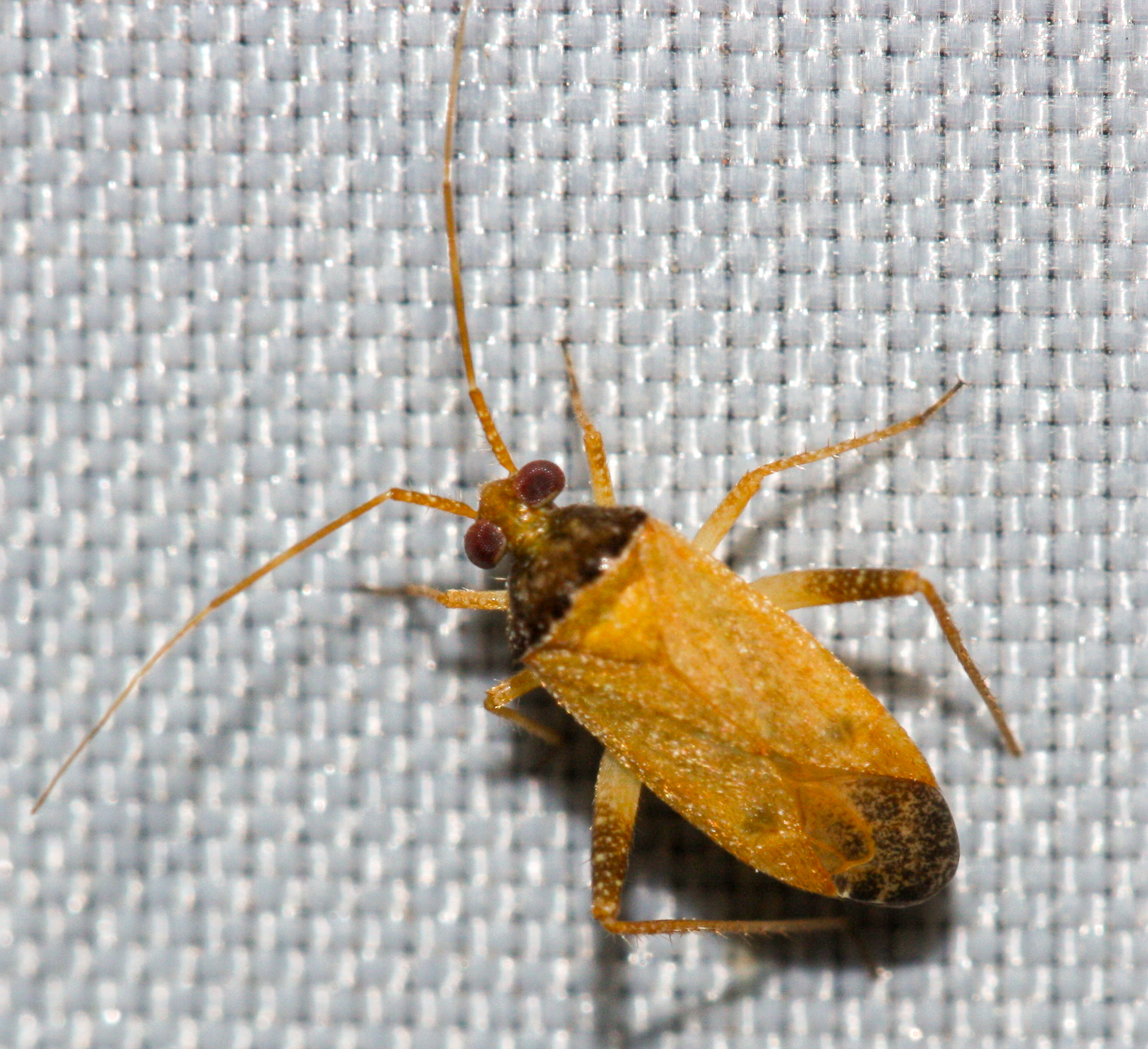
Phytocoris ramosus, Arizona

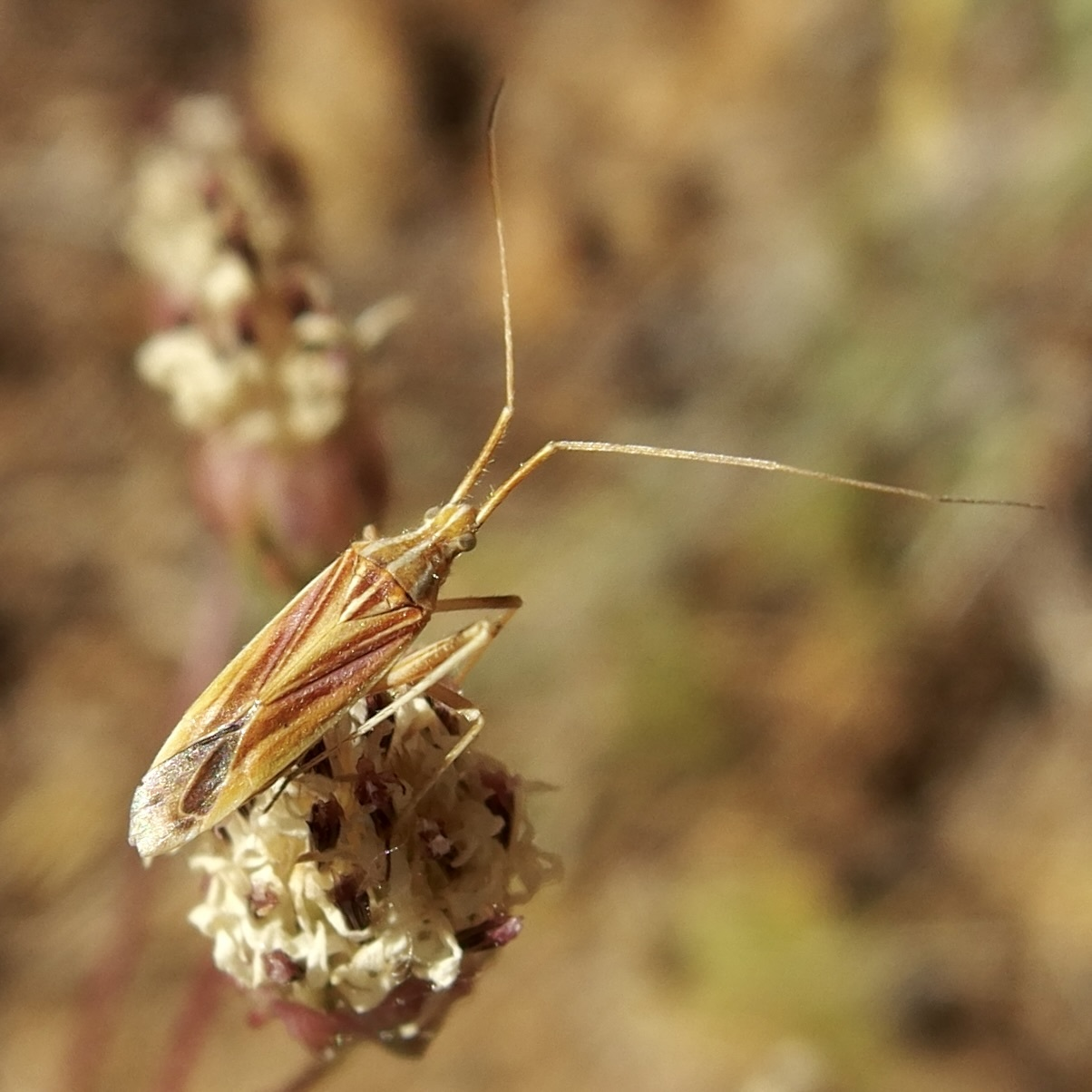
Phytocoris roseipennis, Arizona

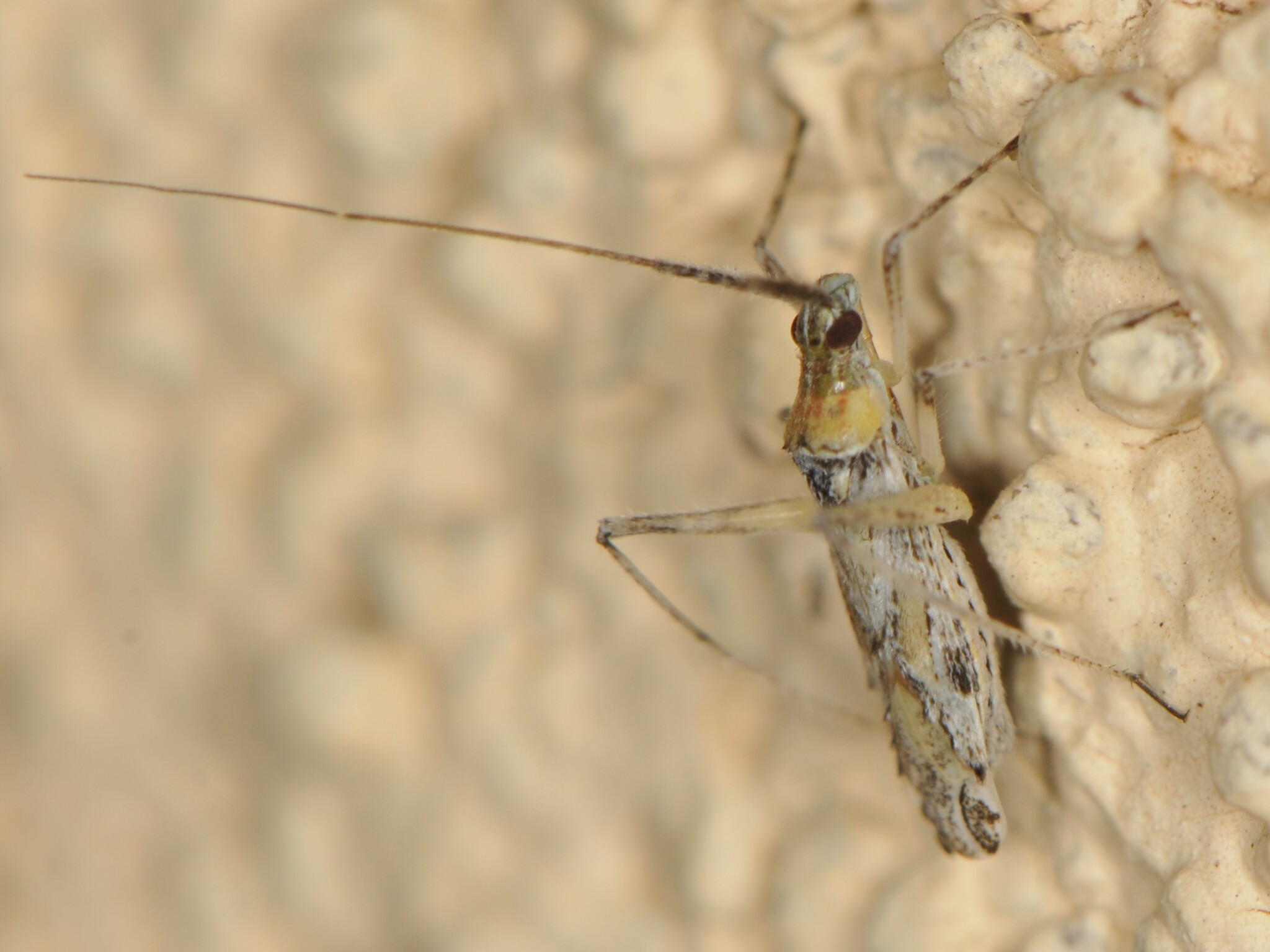
Phytocoris squamosus, New Mexico

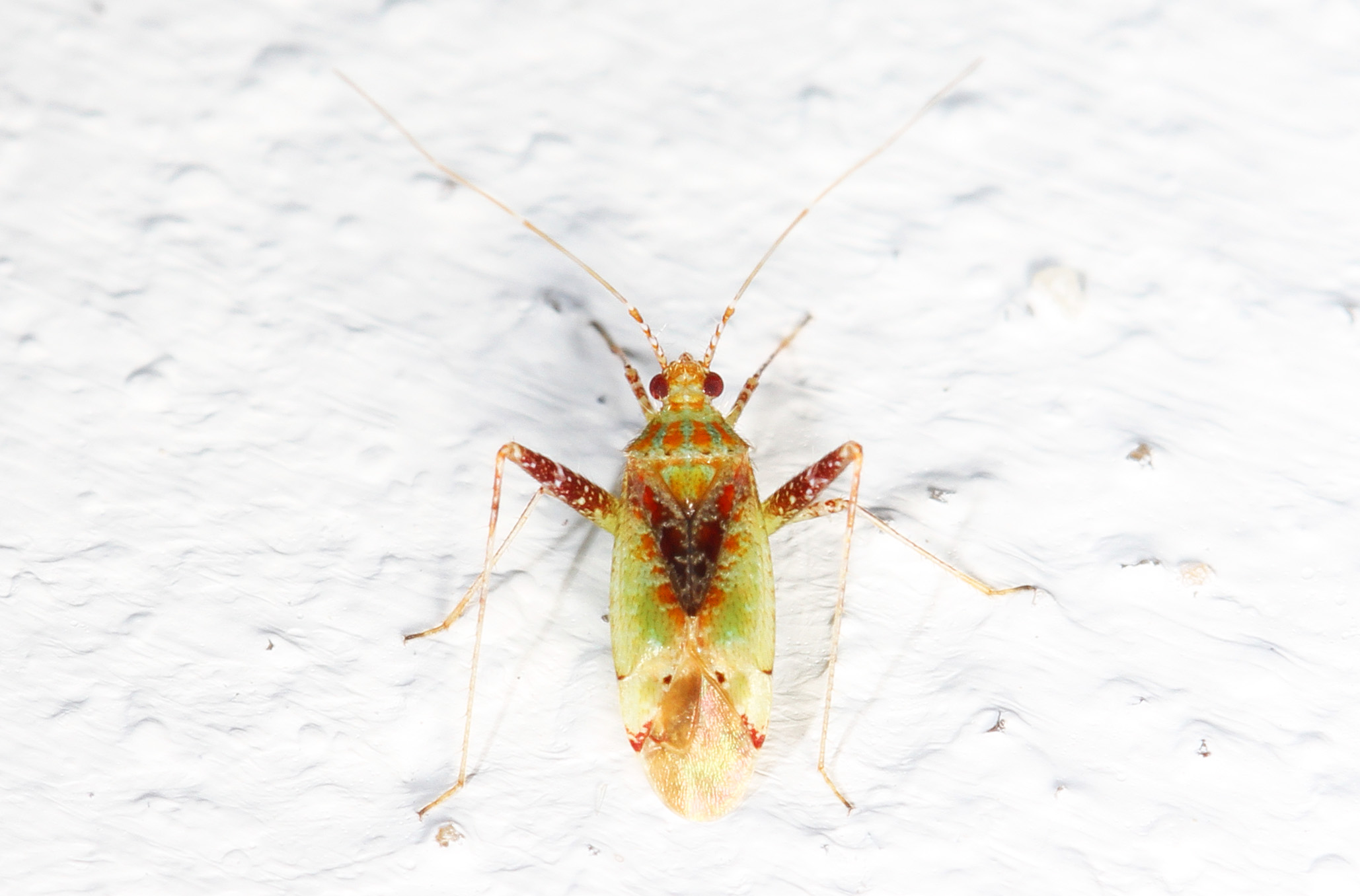
Phytocoris tibialis, Virginia

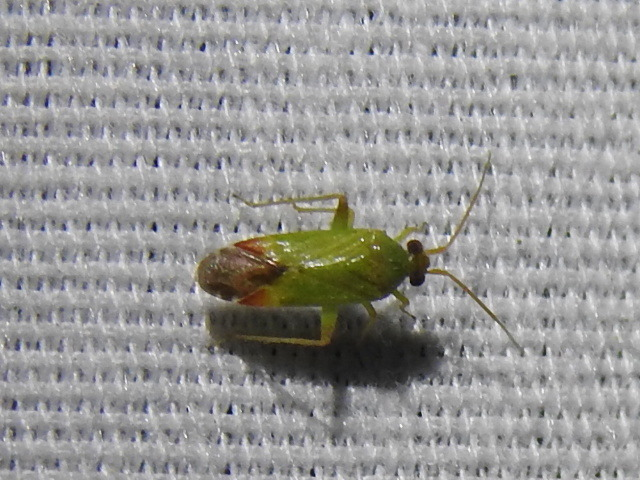
Phytocoris vanduzeei, Texas

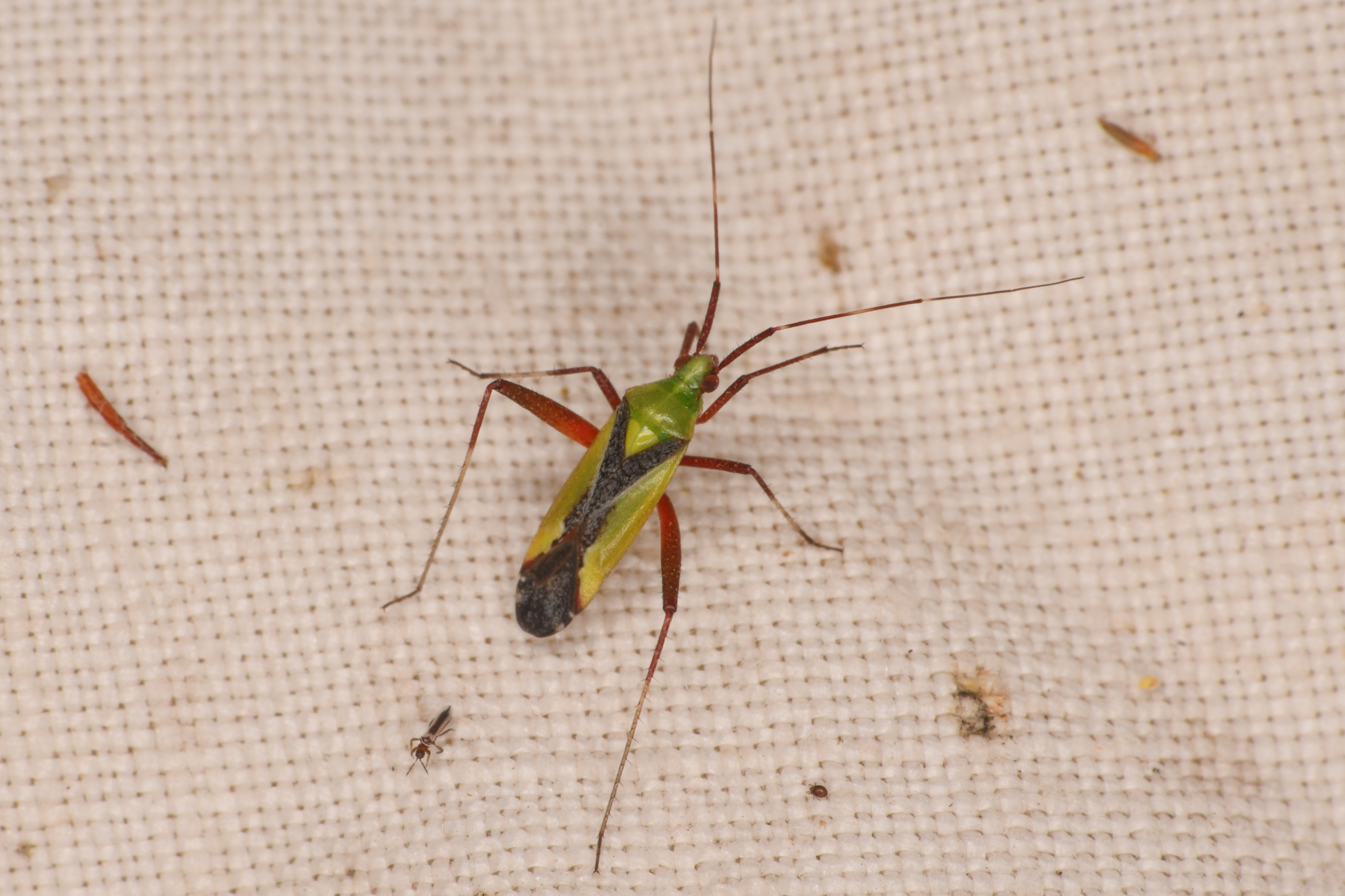
Phytocoris vau, California

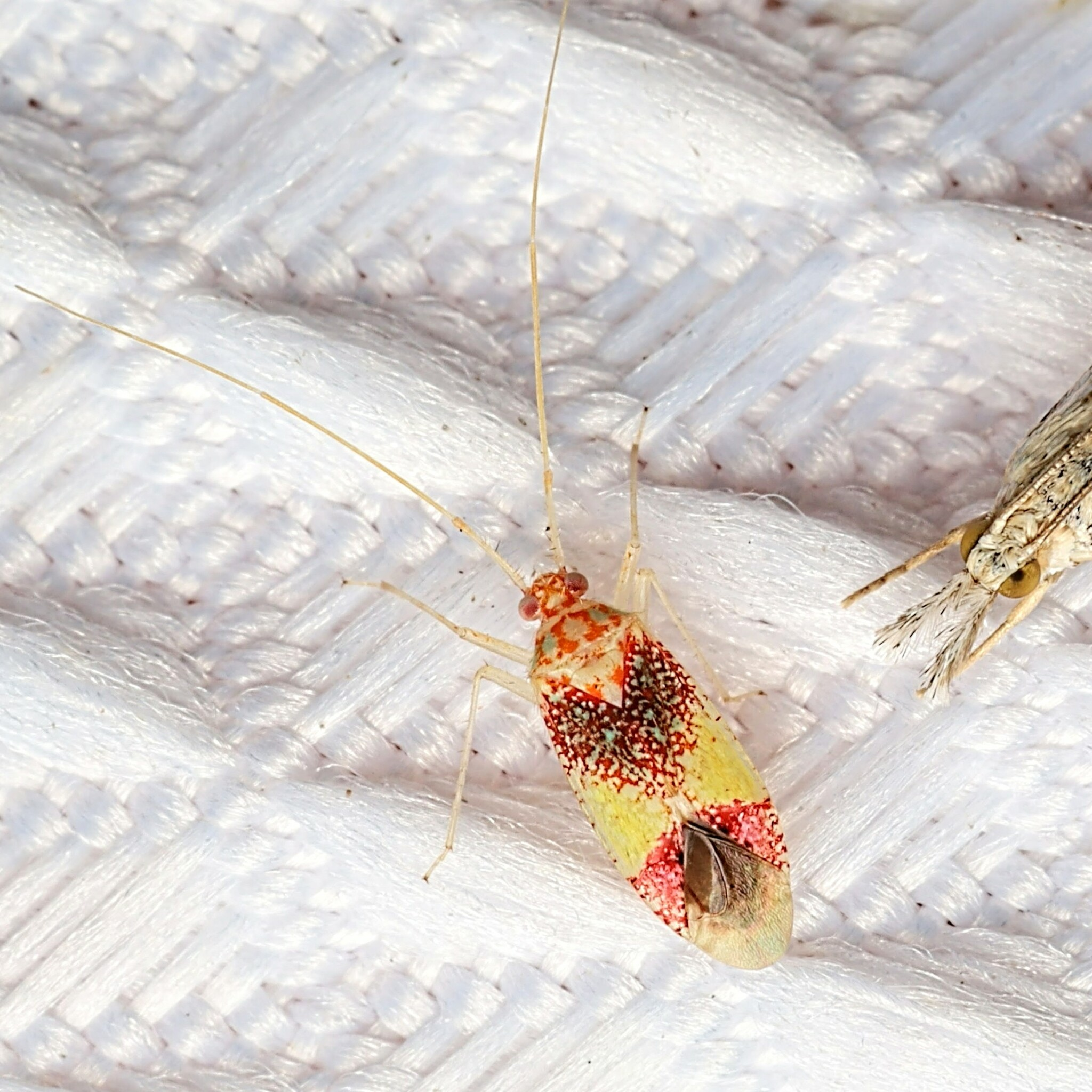
Phytocoris venustus, Maryland

Phytocoris is a genus of plant bugs in the family Miridae. There are more than 700 described species in Phytocoris.

The members of this genus have long hind legs, with hind femora about twice the length of the mid and front femora and tibiae. They are found on every continent except Antarctica.

== Species ==
These 737 species belong to the genus Phytocoris.

- Phytocoris abeillei Puton, 1884
- Phytocoris acaciae Knight, 1925
- Phytocoris aconcaguensis Carvalho & Costa, 1991
- Phytocoris acuminatus Carapezza, 1984
- Phytocoris adenostomae Stonedahl, 1985
- Phytocoris adiacritus Rieger, 1989
- Phytocoris adustus Stonedahl, 1988
- Phytocoris advenus Linnavuori, 1975
- Phytocoris aesculinus Stonedahl, 1988
- Phytocoris aietes Linnavuori, 1971
- Phytocoris alamogordo Stonedahl, 1988
- Phytocoris alashanensis Nonnaizab & Jorigtoo, 1992
- Phytocoris albellus Knight, 1934
- Phytocoris albicuneatus Stonedahl, 1988
- Phytocoris albidopictus Knight, 1961
- Phytocoris albidosquamus Knight, 1968
- Phytocoris albifacies Knight, 1926
- Phytocoris albifrons Knight, 1968
- Phytocoris albitylus Knight, 1926
- Phytocoris albohirsutus Reuter, 1900
- Phytocoris albolineatus Linnavuori, 1984
- Phytocoris algiricus Reuter, 1896
- Phytocoris alkaios Linnavuori, 1974
- Phytocoris alluaudi Poppius, 1912
- Phytocoris alpestris Stonedahl, 1988
- Phytocoris alpicola Linnavuori, 1992
- Phytocoris altus Maldonado, 1969
- Phytocoris alvarengai Carvalho & Costa, 1991
- Phytocoris amardus Zamani & Hosseini, 2019
- Phytocoris americanus Carvalho, 1959
- Phytocoris amygdali Linnavuori, 1999
- Phytocoris anabasidis Linnavuori, 1984
- Phytocoris angustatus Knight, 1961
- Phytocoris angusticollis Knight, 1925
- Phytocoris angustifrons Knight, 1926
- Phytocoris angustulus Germar & Berendt, 1856
- Phytocoris annulicornis (Reuter, 1876)
- Phytocoris antennalis Reuter, 1909
- Phytocoris antennatus Blanchard, 1852
- Phytocoris antennipilis Carvalho & Ferreira, 1969
- Phytocoris anthracinus Odhiambo, 1959
- Phytocoris apache Knight, 1928
- Phytocoris arakhne Linnavuori, 1999
- Phytocoris araucanus Carvalho & Ferreira, 1969
- Phytocoris arbusticola Muminov, 1990
- Phytocoris arenarius Muminov, 1989
- Phytocoris arganiae Lindberg, 1940
- Phytocoris argus Stonedahl, 1988
- Phytocoris ariadnae Hernandez & Stonedahl, 1997
- Phytocoris aridus Stonedahl, 1988
- Phytocoris ariquemensis Carvalho & Costa, 1993
- Phytocoris arizonensis Stonedahl, 1988
- Phytocoris armasi Hernandez & Stonedahl, 1997
- Phytocoris arundinicola Knight, 1941
- Phytocoris arwa Linnavuori & Al-Safadi, 1993
- Phytocoris aspersus Carvalho & Gomes, 1970
- Phytocoris astragali V. Putshkov, 1978
- Phytocoris athenis Linnavuori, 1974
- Phytocoris atomophorus Reuter, 1899
- Phytocoris atriscutum Stonedahl, 1988
- Phytocoris attar Linnavuori, 2000
- Phytocoris auranti Stonedahl, 1988
- Phytocoris aurora Van Duzee, 1920
- Phytocoris austriacus Wagner, 1954
- Phytocoris avius Stonedahl, 1995
- Phytocoris azrouensis Wagner, 1959
- Phytocoris baboquivari Stonedahl, 1988
- Phytocoris bakeri Reuter, 1909
- Phytocoris bakrianus Linnavuori, 2000
- Phytocoris balli Knight, 1926
- Phytocoris balticus Germar & Berendt, 1856
- Phytocoris banderae Hernandez & Stonedahl, 1997
- Phytocoris barikotus Linnavuori, 1974
- Phytocoris bavanus Linnavuori, 2009
- Phytocoris beameri Stonedahl, 1988
- Phytocoris becki Knight, 1968
- Phytocoris belfragei Stonedahl, 1995
- Phytocoris bellissimus Carvalho & Ferreira, 1986
- Phytocoris berbericola Stonedahl, 1988
- Phytocoris berberidis Wagner, 1967
- Phytocoris bergi Atkinson, 1890
- Phytocoris bergianus Carpintero & Cherot, 2005
- Phytocoris bergrothi Reuter, 1892
- Phytocoris biannulicornis Muminov, 1989
- Phytocoris bicolor Maldonado, 1969
- Phytocoris biconicus Carapezza, 1997
- Phytocoris bilineatus Linnavuori, 1975
- Phytocoris biseriatus Wagner, 1968
- Phytocoris bispilosus Carvalho & Ferreira, 1969
- Phytocoris bituberis Stonedahl, 1988
- Phytocoris biumbonatus Stonedahl, 1995
- Phytocoris bivittatus Reuter, 1904
- Phytocoris bleusei Reuter, 1899
- Phytocoris bonaerensis Berg, 1883
- Phytocoris bonaeriensis
- Phytocoris borealis Knight, 1926
- Phytocoris borregoi Stonedahl, 1988
- Phytocoris boyacanus Carvalho & Costa, 1990
- Phytocoris brachymerus Reuter, 1877
- Phytocoris breviatus Knight, 1968
- Phytocoris brevicornis Knight, 1968
- Phytocoris brevidens Linnavuori, 2000
- Phytocoris brevifurcatus Knight, 1920
- Phytocoris brevirostris Wagner, 1957
- Phytocoris brevisetosus Stonedahl, 1988
- Phytocoris breviusculus Reuter, 1876
- Phytocoris brimleyi Knight, 1974
- Phytocoris brooksi Kelton, 1979
- Phytocoris broweri Knight, 1974
- Phytocoris brunneus Maldonado, 1969
- Phytocoris brunnipunctatus Maldonado, 1969
- Phytocoris buenoi Knight, 1920
- Phytocoris bupalos Linnavuori, 1974
- Phytocoris buxi Ribaut, 1928
- Phytocoris calabricus Tamanini, 1975
- Phytocoris caledoniensis Carvalho, 1955
- Phytocoris californicus Knight, 1968
- Phytocoris calli Knight, 1934
- Phytocoris calliger Wagner, 1957
- Phytocoris calvus Van Duzee, 1920
- Phytocoris canadensis Van Duzee, 1920
- Phytocoris candidus Van Duzee, 1918
- Phytocoris canescens Reuter, 1909
- Phytocoris caraganae Nonnaizab & Jorigtoo, 1992
- Phytocoris carapezzai Çerçi, KoÇak & Tezcan, 2019
- Phytocoris carayoni Wagner, 1967
- Phytocoris carnosulus Van Duzee, 1920
- Phytocoris caryae Knight, 1923
- Phytocoris catalinae Stonedahl, 1988
- Phytocoris caucasicus Kerzhner, 1964
- Phytocoris ceanothicus Stonedahl, 1988
- Phytocoris cedri Lindberg, 1948
- Phytocoris cephalonicae Rieger, 1989
- Phytocoris cercocarpi Knight, 1928
- Phytocoris chardoni Puton, 1887
- Phytocoris chemehuevi Stonedahl, 1988
- Phytocoris chicotei Bolivar, 1881
- Phytocoris chihuahuanae Stonedahl, 1988
- Phytocoris cienega Stonedahl, 1988
- Phytocoris cinereus Stonedahl, 1988
- Phytocoris citrinoides Carvalho & Gomes, 1970
- Phytocoris citrinus Bolivar, 1881
- Phytocoris clarensis Carvalho & Costa, 1991
- Phytocoris claripunctatus Maldonado, 1969
- Phytocoris cochise Stonedahl, 1988
- Phytocoris columbiensis Carvalho & Costa, 1990
- Phytocoris commissuralis Van Duzee, 1920
- Phytocoris compsocerus Reuter, 1907
- Phytocoris comulus Knight, 1928
- Phytocoris confluens Reuter, 1909
- Phytocoris confusus Reuter, 1896
- Phytocoris conifer Wagner, 1959
- Phytocoris coniferales Stonedahl, 1988
- Phytocoris coniferalis Stonedahl, 1988
- Phytocoris consobrinus Germar & Berendt, 1856
- Phytocoris consors Van Duzee, 1918
- Phytocoris conspersipes Reuter, 1909
- Phytocoris conspicuus Johnston, 1930
- Phytocoris conspurcatus Knight, 1920
- Phytocoris contrastus Knight, 1968
- Phytocoris coquimbensis Carvalho & Carpintero, 1989
- Phytocoris coronadoi Stonedahl, 1988
- Phytocoris corticevivens Knight, 1920
- Phytocoris corticola Stonedahl, 1988
- Phytocoris cortitectus Knight, 1920
- Phytocoris cossyrensis Carapezza, 1995
- Phytocoris costaricensis Carvalho, 1990
- Phytocoris cowaniae Stonedahl, 1988
- Phytocoris crawfordi Knight, 1974
- Phytocoris creticus Wagner, 1959
- Phytocoris crinitus Distant, 1904
- Phytocoris crito Linnavuori, 1972
- Phytocoris crotonis Linnavuori, 1975
- Phytocoris crucifer Reuter, 1894
- Phytocoris crux Wagner, 1959
- Phytocoris cubensis Hernandez & Stonedahl, 1997
- Phytocoris cunealis Van Duzee, 1914
- Phytocoris cuneotinctus Knight, 1925
- Phytocoris cylapinus Carvalho & Gomes, 1970
- Phytocoris cyprius Wagner, 1967
- Phytocoris damocles Linnavuori, 1972
- Phytocoris dashtanus Linnavuori & Hosseini, 1998
- Phytocoris davisi Knight, 1923
- Phytocoris decorus (Reuter, 1909)
- Phytocoris decurvatus Knight, 1968
- Phytocoris degregorioi Ribes & Ribes, 2002
- Phytocoris dehbidensis Linnavuori, 2000
- Phytocoris delicatulus Bolivar, 1881
- Phytocoris denticulatus Stonedahl, 1995
- Phytocoris dentistylus Linnavuori, 1999
- Phytocoris depictus Knight, 1923
- Phytocoris deserticola Knight, 1968
- Phytocoris desertinus Stonedahl, 1988
- Phytocoris desertorum Reuter, 1900
- Phytocoris diamantinensis Carvalho & Costa, 1990
- Phytocoris dichrooscytoides Josifov, 1974
- Phytocoris difficilis Knight, 1927
- Phytocoris difformis Knight, 1934
- Phytocoris digla Linnavuori, 1974
- Phytocoris dike Linnavuori, 2000
- Phytocoris dimidiatus Kirschbaum, 1856
- Phytocoris dimorphus Lindberg, 1940
- Phytocoris discrepans Odhiambo, 1959
- Phytocoris diversus Knight, 1920
- Phytocoris divisensis Carvalho & Costa, 1991
- Phytocoris djerablisus Linnavuori, 1974
- Phytocoris djeridi Carapezza, 1997
- Phytocoris dlabolai Linnavuori, 2000
- Phytocoris dolichopterus Reuter, 1905
- Phytocoris dorikha Linnavuori, 1974
- Phytocoris dreisbachi Knight, 1974
- Phytocoris driesbachi
- Phytocoris dulcis Linnavuori, 1975
- Phytocoris dumicola Stonedahl, 1988
- Phytocoris duplicatus Linnavuori, 1975
- Phytocoris echinopis Linnavuori, 1984
- Phytocoris ecuadorensis Carvalho & Costa, 1990
- Phytocoris eduardi Kerzhner & Schuh, 1998
- Phytocoris effictus Stal, 1860
- Phytocoris eileithyia Linnavuori, 1971
- Phytocoris ejuncidus Stonedahl, 1988
- Phytocoris elburzanus Linnavuori, 2000
- Phytocoris electilis Stonedahl, 1988
- Phytocoris elegans (Distant, 1883)
- Phytocoris elongatulus Kerzhner & Josifov, 1999
- Phytocoris empirensis Knight, 1968
- Phytocoris enmerkar Linnavuori, 1984
- Phytocoris ephedrae Knight, 1961
- Phytocoris erectus Van Duzee, 1920
- Phytocoris erinaceae Wagner, 1977
- Phytocoris erlangeri Poppius, 1912
- Phytocoris euglotta Germar & Berendt, 1856
- Phytocoris eunomia Linnavuori, 1992
- Phytocoris eurekae Bliven, 1966
- Phytocoris excellens Linnavuori, 1975
- Phytocoris exemplus Knight, 1926
- Phytocoris exilis Odhiambo, 1959
- Phytocoris eximius Reuter, 1876
- Phytocoris exohataensis Xu & Zheng, 2001
- Phytocoris exoletus A. Costa, 1853
- Phytocoris extensus Reuter, 1904
- Phytocoris facialis Wagner, 1972
- Phytocoris falcatus Linnavuori, 1984
- Phytocoris femoratus Kerzhner & Schuh, 1995
- Phytocoris fenestratus Reuter, 1909
- Phytocoris ferghanensis Rosenzweig, 2000
- Phytocoris ferrarii Carapezza, 1997
- Phytocoris ferreirai Kerzhner & Schuh, 1998
- Phytocoris fieberi Bolivar, 1881
- Phytocoris filomele Linnavuori, 2000
- Phytocoris fiuzai Carvalho & Costa, 1990
- Phytocoris flammula Reuter, 1875
- Phytocoris flavus Linnavuori, 2000
- Phytocoris fluminensis Carvalho & Gomes, 1970
- Phytocoris formosus Van Duzee, 1916
- Phytocoris fraterculus Van Duzee, 1918
- Phytocoris friganae V. Putshkov, 1978
- Phytocoris fulvipennis Knight, 1928
- Phytocoris fulvus Knight, 1920
- Phytocoris fumatus Reuter, 1909
- Phytocoris fuscipennis Knight, 1934
- Phytocoris fuscomaculatus (Stal, 1860)
- Phytocoris fuscosignatus Knight, 1928
- Phytocoris gabes Wagner, 1977
- Phytocoris gandalicus Linnavuori, 1974
- Phytocoris garagoensis Carvalho & Costa, 1990
- Phytocoris garyi Schwartz & Cherot, 2005
- Phytocoris geminus Linnavuori, 1975
- Phytocoris geniculatus Van Duzee, 1918
- Phytocoris gilgamesh Linnavuori, 1984
- Phytocoris gobicus Yang, Hao, & Nonnaizab, 1995
- Phytocoris goryeonus Oh, Yasunaga & Lee
- Phytocoris guadalupe Stonedahl, 1995
- Phytocoris guaranianus Carvalho & Gomes, 1970
- Phytocoris guianus Costa, Cherot, & Carpintero, 2008
- Phytocoris guttatus Reuter, 1908
- Phytocoris guttulatus Reuter, 1894
- Phytocoris hakoni Wagner, 1959
- Phytocoris haloxyli V. Putshkov, 1976
- Phytocoris harmonia Linnavuori, 2000
- Phytocoris hartigi Wagner, 1973
- Phytocoris hawramanicum Hosseini & Mohammadi, 2018
- Phytocoris heidemanni Reuter, 1909
- Phytocoris heissi Linnavuori, 2008
- Phytocoris hesperidum Linnavuori, 1970
- Phytocoris hettenshawi Bliven, 1956
- Phytocoris hirsuticus Knight, 1968
- Phytocoris hirsutulus Flor, 1861
- Phytocoris hirtipes Reuter, 1896
- Phytocoris hirtus Van Duzee, 1918
- Phytocoris hispidus Linnavuori, 1986
- Phytocoris hissariensis Linnavuori, 1963
- Phytocoris histriculus Van Duzee, 1920
- Phytocoris hoberlandti Linnavuori, 1999
- Phytocoris hoffmani Henry, 2009
- Phytocoris hopi Knight, 1928
- Phytocoris hosrovi V. Putshkov, 1980
- Phytocoris hsiaoi Xu & Zheng, 2002
- Phytocoris huachuca Stonedahl, 1988
- Phytocoris hualapai Stonedahl, 1988
- Phytocoris humeralis Wagner, 1976
- Phytocoris husseyi Knight, 1923
- Phytocoris hyampom Bliven, 1966
- Phytocoris hypoleucoides Stonedahl, 1988
- Phytocoris hyrcaniaensis Zamani & Hosseini, 2019
- Phytocoris iactans Linnavuori, 1986
- Phytocoris iani Hernandez & Stonedahl, 1997
- Phytocoris iguazuensis Carvalho & Carpintero, 1986
- Phytocoris imias Hernandez & Stonedahl, 1997
- Phytocoris immanis Odhiambo, 1960
- Phytocoris imperialensis Stonedahl, 1988
- Phytocoris incanus Fieber, 1864
- Phytocoris infuscatus Reuter, 1909
- Phytocoris ingens Van Duzee, 1920
- Phytocoris inops Uhler, 1877
- Phytocoris insignis Reuter, 1876
- Phytocoris insulatus Stonedahl, 1988
- Phytocoris insulicola Poppius, 1914
- Phytocoris intermontanus Stonedahl, 1988
- Phytocoris interruptus Wagner, 1967
- Phytocoris interspersus Uhler, 1895
- Phytocoris intricatus Flor, 1861
- Phytocoris involutus Germar & Berendt, 1856
- Phytocoris ion Linnavuori, 1973
- Phytocoris irroratus Blanchard, 1852
- Phytocoris issykensis Poppius, 1912
- Phytocoris itajaiensis Carvalho & Costa, 1992
- Phytocoris italicus Wagner, 1954
- Phytocoris iyribozi Çerçi, Özgen & Tezcan, 2021
- Phytocoris izyaslavi Cherot & Carpintero, 2006
- Phytocoris jacareacanga Carvalho & Costa, 1990
- Phytocoris jeanpericarti Cherot & Carpintero, 2009
- Phytocoris jiuzhaiensis Qi & Shi, 2005
- Phytocoris jordani Wagner, 1954
- Phytocoris jordii Carpintero & Cherot, 2011
- Phytocoris jorigtooi Kerzhner & Schuh, 1995
- Phytocoris jouani Montrouzier, 1865
- Phytocoris jucundus Van Duzee, 1914
- Phytocoris jugatus Costa, Cherot, & Carpintero, 2008
- Phytocoris juinensis Carvalho & Costa, 1991
- Phytocoris juliae Stonedahl, 1988
- Phytocoris junceus Knight, 1923
- Phytocoris juniperanus Knight, 1968
- Phytocoris juniperi Frey-Gessner, 1865
- Phytocoris junipericola Knight, 1927
- Phytocoris kalidii Trapeznikova, 2009
- Phytocoris kamus Wagner, 1975
- Phytocoris kandovanus Linnavuori & Hosseini, 1998
- Phytocoris kansisrob Linnavuori, 1975
- Phytocoris kazakhstanicus Muminov, 1989
- Phytocoris keltoni Kerzhner & Schuh, 1998
- Phytocoris kermanus Linnavuori, 2000
- Phytocoris kerrvillensis Stonedahl, 1995
- Phytocoris kerzhneri Linnavuori, 1971
- Phytocoris ketinelbi Bliven, 1966
- Phytocoris khalkhalicus Linnavuori & Hosseini, 1998
- Phytocoris kiowa Stonedahl, 1988
- Phytocoris kirgizorum Muminov, 1998
- Phytocoris kiritschenkoi Poppius, 1912
- Phytocoris knighti Hsiao, 1941
- Phytocoris knowltoni Knight, 1974
- Phytocoris koronis Linnavuori, 1992
- Phytocoris ktenocoroides Carapezza, 2002
- Phytocoris kuschei Stonedahl, 1988
- Phytocoris kyzylkumi Muminov, 1989
- Phytocoris laciniatus Tamanini, 1975
- Phytocoris lacunosus Knight, 1920
- Phytocoris laevis (Uhler, 1895)
- Phytocoris laios Linnavuori, 1974
- Phytocoris languidus Xu & Zheng, 2002
- Phytocoris lasiomerus Reuter, 1909
- Phytocoris laticeps Knight, 1968
- Phytocoris latisquamus Stonedahl, 1988
- Phytocoris lattini Stonedahl, 1988
- Phytocoris lavendulae Wagner, 1971
- Phytocoris lenis Van Duzee, 1923
- Phytocoris lenti Carvalho & Gomes, 1970
- Phytocoris lesnei Reuter, 1902
- Phytocoris leucophaeus Stonedahl, 1988
- Phytocoris leucopterus Kerzhner & Schuh, 1995
- Phytocoris libycus Wagner, 1968
- Phytocoris limonii Gunther, 1992
- Phytocoris lindbergi Wagner, 1954
- Phytocoris lineaticollis Reuter, 1904
- Phytocoris lineatus Reuter, 1909
- Phytocoris linnavuorii Kerzhner & Schuh, 1998
- Phytocoris listi Knight, 1928
- Phytocoris lojaensis Carvalho & Gomes, 1969
- Phytocoris longiantennatus Carvalho & Costa, 1993
- Phytocoris longiceps Wagner, 1967
- Phytocoris longihirtus Knight, 1968
- Phytocoris longipennis Flor, 1861
- Phytocoris longiscutum Wagner, 1968
- Phytocoris longissimus Xu & Zheng, 2002
- Phytocoris loralis Wagner, 1976
- Phytocoris loretoensis Van Duzee, 1923
- Phytocoris lugalbanda Linnavuori, 1984
- Phytocoris lui Xu & Zheng, 2002
- Phytocoris luteolus Knight, 1923
- Phytocoris lycii Stonedahl, 1988
- Phytocoris maestrensis Hernandez & Stonedahl, 1997
- Phytocoris maichewicus Linnavuori, 1975
- Phytocoris malickyi Rieger, 1995
- Phytocoris manauensis Carvalho, 1983
- Phytocoris maricopae Stonedahl, 1988
- Phytocoris maritimus Van Duzee, 1920
- Phytocoris mariut Linnavuori, 1974
- Phytocoris marmoratus Blanchard, 1852
- Phytocoris maroccanus Wagner, 1967
- Phytocoris marqua Menard & Schwartz, 2023
- Phytocoris martini Reuter, 1895
- Phytocoris marvanus Linnavuori, 2000
- Phytocoris matocqi Pagola-Carte, 2019
- Phytocoris matogrossensis Carvalho & Costa, 1990
- Phytocoris mauli Lindberg, 1961
- Phytocoris mcivor Menard & Schwartz, 2023
- Phytocoris megatuberis Stonedahl, 1988
- Phytocoris meinanderi Wagner, 1968
- Phytocoris melendezae Carvalho & Costa, 1990
- Phytocoris mellarius Knight, 1925
- Phytocoris meridionalis Herrich-Schaeffer, 1835
- Phytocoris merus Germar & Berendt, 1856
- Phytocoris mesillae Knight, 1968
- Phytocoris mexicanus Carvalho, 1959
- Phytocoris michiganae Knight, 1974
- Phytocoris microfascinum Stonedahl, 1988
- Phytocoris migrensis V. Putshkov, 1978
- Phytocoris minabanus Linnavuori, 1999
- Phytocoris minakatai Yasunaga & Schwartz, 2015
- Phytocoris minensis Carvalho, 1986
- Phytocoris miniatus Knight, 1961
- Phytocoris minituberculatus Knight, 1968
- Phytocoris minor Kirschbaum, 1856
- Phytocoris minutulus Reuter, 1909
- Phytocoris miridioides Lethierry, 1877
- Phytocoris mirus Knight, 1928
- Phytocoris mirzanus Linnavuori, 2006
- Phytocoris moesticolor Reuter, 1908
- Phytocoris moestus Reuter, 1903
- Phytocoris moira Linnavuori, 1972
- Phytocoris mongolicus Nonnaizab & Jorigtoo, 1992
- Phytocoris monoceros Linnavuori, 1999
- Phytocoris monophyllae Stonedahl, 1988
- Phytocoris monticola Linnavuori, 1986
- Phytocoris montrouzieri Carvalho, 1955
- Phytocoris muminovi Josifov, 1974
- Phytocoris mundus Reuter, 1909
- Phytocoris nabataeus Linnavuori, 1984
- Phytocoris nafudicus Linnavuori, 1986
- Phytocoris navajo Stonedahl, 1988
- Phytocoris neglectus Knight, 1920
- Phytocoris nesmia Lucas, 1849
- Phytocoris nevadensis Lindberg, 1934
- Phytocoris nicholi Knight, 1928
- Phytocoris nigricollis Knight, 1923
- Phytocoris nigrifrons Van Duzee, 1920
- Phytocoris nigrisignatus Knight, 1934
- Phytocoris nigrisquamus Stonedahl, 1988
- Phytocoris nigritus Nonnaizab & Jorigtoo, 1992
- Phytocoris nigrolineatus Knight, 1968
- Phytocoris nigropunctatus Poppius, 1915
- Phytocoris ningxiaensis Nonnaizab & Jorigtoo, 1996
- Phytocoris nitidicollis Reuter, 1908
- Phytocoris nitrariae Xu & Zheng, 1997
- Phytocoris niveatus Horvath, 1891
- Phytocoris nobilis Stonedahl, 1984
- Phytocoris nodistylus Wagner, 1968
- Phytocoris nonnaizabi Kerzhner & Schuh, 1995
- Phytocoris notoscutellaris Xu & Zheng, 2002
- Phytocoris novobliquevittatus Xu & Zheng, 2002
- Phytocoris nowickyi Fieber, 1870
- Phytocoris obliquevittatus Xu & Zheng, 2002
- Phytocoris obliquoides Wagner, 1959
- Phytocoris obliquus A. Costa, 1853
- Phytocoris obscuratus Carvalho, 1959
- Phytocoris obsoletus Blanchard, 1852
- Phytocoris obtectus Knight, 1920
- Phytocoris occidentalis Stonedahl, 1984
- Phytocoris ohataensis Linnavuori, 1963
- Phytocoris oleae Linnavuori, 1962
- Phytocoris olseni Knight, 1923
- Phytocoris omani Stonedahl, 1988
- Phytocoris onustus Van Duzee, 1920
- Phytocoris oppositus Knight, 1926
- Phytocoris organensis Carvalho & Gomes, 1970
- Phytocoris osage Knight, 1953
- Phytocoris osborni Knight, 1928
- Phytocoris ouropretanus Carvalho & Costa, 1990
- Phytocoris paghmanus Linnavuori, 1974
- Phytocoris pallidicollis Kerzhner, 1977
- Phytocoris pallidicornis Reuter, 1876
- Phytocoris pallidilineatus Stonedahl, 1995
- Phytocoris panamensis Carvalho & Costa, 1991
- Phytocoris par Odhiambo, 1960
- Phytocoris parandinus Carvalho & Ferreira, 1969
- Phytocoris pardoi Wagner, 1968
- Phytocoris parrotiae V. Putshkov, 1978
- Phytocoris parvidens Muminov, 1998
- Phytocoris parvoculus Odhiambo, 1960
- Phytocoris parvuloides Wagner, 1961
- Phytocoris parvulus Reuter, 1880
- Phytocoris paveli Linnavuori, 1972
- Phytocoris pectinatus Knight, 1920
- Phytocoris perangustus Wagner, 1961
- Phytocoris philippinensis Poppius, 1915
- Phytocoris phrygicus Wagner, 1955
- Phytocoris piceicola Knight, 1928
- Phytocoris pici Reuter, 1895
- Phytocoris pictipennis Xu & Zheng, 2002
- Phytocoris pilifer Reuter, 1880
- Phytocoris pilipes Reuter, 1895
- Phytocoris pinguis Odhiambo, 1960
- Phytocoris pini Kirschbaum, 1856
- Phytocoris pinicola Knight, 1920
- Phytocoris pinihalepensis Lindberg, 1948
- Phytocoris pintoi Stonedahl, 1988
- Phytocoris planituberis Stonedahl, 1988
- Phytocoris platydens Kerzhner, 1964
- Phytocoris plaumanni Carvalho & Costa, 1990
- Phytocoris plenus Van Duzee, 1918
- Phytocoris pleuroimos T. Henry, 1985
- Phytocoris pluvialis Poppius, 1910
- Phytocoris poecilus Wagner, 1962
- Phytocoris poissoni Theobald, 1937
- Phytocoris polhemusi Stonedahl, 1988
- Phytocoris politus Reuter, 1909
- Phytocoris populi (Linnaeus, 1758)
- Phytocoris potanini Reuter, 1906
- Phytocoris praealtus Stonedahl, 1988
- Phytocoris praesignis (Distant, 1893)
- Phytocoris presidio Stonedahl, 1988
- Phytocoris priesneri Wagner, 1968
- Phytocoris procerus Linnavuori, 1975
- Phytocoris proctori Knight, 1974
- Phytocoris pseudocellatus Ribes & Pagola-Carte, 2009
- Phytocoris pseudonymus Hussey, 1957
- Phytocoris pseudoscytulus Josifov, 1974
- Phytocoris psole Linnavuori, 1973
- Phytocoris psuedobscuratus Rieger & Pagola-Carte, 2009
- Phytocoris puella Reuter, 1876
- Phytocoris pugio Seidenstucker, 1969
- Phytocoris pulchellus Knight, 1934
- Phytocoris pulchricollis Van Duzee, 1923
- Phytocoris purshiae Stonedahl, 1988
- Phytocoris purvus Knight, 1927
- Phytocoris pyrounakifer Rieger, 1986
- Phytocoris quadriannulipes Knight, 1968
- Phytocoris quadricinctus Knight, 1968
- Phytocoris quadridens Muminov, 1995
- Phytocoris quercicola Knight, 1920
- Phytocoris quercinus Stonedahl, 1988
- Phytocoris radiatae Stonedahl, 1988
- Phytocoris rainieri Knight, 1974
- Phytocoris ramosus Uhler, 1894
- Phytocoris raunoi Kerzhner & Schuh, 1995
- Phytocoris ravidus Stonedahl, 1995
- Phytocoris reamuriae Trapeznikova, 2009
- Phytocoris relativus Knight, 1968
- Phytocoris reraiensis Lindberg, 1940
- Phytocoris retamae Reuter, 1900
- Phytocoris reticulatus Knight, 1968
- Phytocoris reuteri Saunders, 1876
- Phytocoris ribesi Wagner, 1969
- Phytocoris ricardoi Maldonado, 1969
- Phytocoris riegeri Ribes & Heiss, 2001
- Phytocoris rileyi Menard & Schwartz, 2023
- Phytocoris rioleonensis Carvalho & Gomes, 1969
- Phytocoris rjabovi Kerzhner, 1964
- Phytocoris robustus Odhiambo, 1960
- Phytocoris rondoniensis Carvalho & Costa, 1990
- Phytocoris roseipennis Knight, 1934
- Phytocoris roseotinctus Knight, 1925
- Phytocoris roseus (Uhler, 1894)
- Phytocoris rosillos Stonedahl, 1995
- Phytocoris rosmarini Wagner, 1976
- Phytocoris rostratus Linnavuori, 2000
- Phytocoris rubellus Knight, 1926
- Phytocoris rubigionosus Nonnaizab & Jorigtoo, 1992
- Phytocoris rubrescens Blanchard, 1852
- Phytocoris rubrimaculatus Stonedahl, 1988
- Phytocoris rubrocuneatus Stonedahl, 1988
- Phytocoris rubroornatus Knight, 1961
- Phytocoris rubropictus Knight, 1923
- Phytocoris rubrostrigatus Odhiambo, 1959
- Phytocoris rubrovenosus Carvalho & Ferreira, 1969
- Phytocoris rufoscriptus Van Duzee, 1914
- Phytocoris rufus Van Duzee, 1912
- Phytocoris sacramento Stonedahl, 1988
- Phytocoris sagax Van Duzee, 1920
- Phytocoris sahragardi Linnavuori, 2006
- Phytocoris salicis Knight, 1920
- Phytocoris salsolae Puton, 1874
- Phytocoris sanbernardino Stonedahl, 1988
- Phytocoris sanctipetri Carapezza, 1985
- Phytocoris sangabriel Stonedahl, 1988
- Phytocoris sanguinolentum (Distant, 1893)
- Phytocoris sanjoaquin Stonedahl, 1988
- Phytocoris santolinae Wagner, 1961
- Phytocoris sardus Wagner, 1976
- Phytocoris saundersi Reuter, 1896
- Phytocoris sauricus Muminov, 1998
- Phytocoris scapatus Wagner, 1968
- Phytocoris schaeuffelei Wagner, 1957
- Phytocoris schaffneri Stonedahl, 1988
- Phytocoris schmitzi Menard & Schwartz, 2023
- Phytocoris schotti Knight, 1926
- Phytocoris schuhi Stonedahl, 1988
- Phytocoris schuylkillensis T. Henry, 1974
- Phytocoris schwartzi Stonedahl, 1988
- Phytocoris scituloides Lindberg, 1948
- Phytocoris scitulus Reuter, 1908
- Phytocoris scotinus Kerzhner, 1977
- Phytocoris seidenstueckeri Wagner, 1955
- Phytocoris selvagensis Ribes, 1978
- Phytocoris semicrux Wagner, 1969
- Phytocoris seminotatus Knight, 1934
- Phytocoris sendelii Germar & Berendt, 1856
- Phytocoris serranus Carvalho & Gomes, 1970
- Phytocoris setiger Reuter, 1896
- Phytocoris sewardi Bliven, 1966
- Phytocoris sexguttatus Wagner, 1975
- Phytocoris shabliovskii Kerzhner, 1988
- Phytocoris shorensis Linnavuori, 2000
- Phytocoris shoshoni Stonedahl, 1988
- Phytocoris sichuanensis Xu & Zheng, 2002
- Phytocoris sierrae Stonedahl, 1988
- Phytocoris signaticollis Linnavuori, 1960
- Phytocoris signatipes Knight, 1926
- Phytocoris similaris Hernandez & Stonedahl, 1997
- Phytocoris simulatus Knight, 1928
- Phytocoris sinicus Poppius, 1915
- Phytocoris sinuatus Reuter, 1894
- Phytocoris sjostedti Poppius, 1910
- Phytocoris solano Stonedahl, 1988
- Phytocoris somersojae Kerzhner & Schuh, 1995
- Phytocoris sonorensis Van Duzee, 1920
- Phytocoris spicatus Knight, 1920
- Phytocoris squamosus Knight, 1934
- Phytocoris stellatus Van Duzee, 1920
- Phytocoris stitti Knight, 1961
- Phytocoris stoliczkanus Distant, 1879
- Phytocoris stonedahli Kerzhner & Schuh, 1995
- Phytocoris strigilifer Linnavuori, 1965
- Phytocoris strigosus Knight, 1925
- Phytocoris strymonensis Josifov, 1990
- Phytocoris stysi Linnavuori, 2008
- Phytocoris suadela Linnavuori, 1972
- Phytocoris suavis (Reuter, 1876)
- Phytocoris sublineatus Knight, 1968
- Phytocoris subpallidus Wagner, 1975
- Phytocoris subvittatus (Stal, 1860)
- Phytocoris sulcatus Knight, 1920
- Phytocoris sulinus Carvalho & Costa, 1990
- Phytocoris sunti V. Putshkov, 1976
- Phytocoris sweihanus Linnavuori & van Harten, 2006
- Phytocoris swirskii Linnavuori, 1960
- Phytocoris tauricola Linnavuori, 1965
- Phytocoris tauricus Kerzhner, 1964
- Phytocoris taxodii Knight, 1926
- Phytocoris tehachapi Stonedahl, 1988
- Phytocoris tener Kiritshenko, 1952
- Phytocoris tenerum Stonedahl, 1988
- Phytocoris tenuis Van Duzee, 1920
- Phytocoris teutonianus Carvalho & Costa, 1990
- Phytocoris texanus Knight, 1961
- Phytocoris thisbe Linnavuori, 1999
- Phytocoris thrax Josifov, 1969
- Phytocoris thymelaeanus Tamanini, 1980
- Phytocoris thymi Linnavuori, 1984
- Phytocoris tibialis Reuter, 1876
- Phytocoris tibullus Linnavuori, 2000
- Phytocoris tiliae (Fabricius, 1777)
- Phytocoris tilliandsiae Johnston, 1935
- Phytocoris tithonos Linnavuori & Al-Safadi, 1993
- Phytocoris tobrendae Stonedahl, 1988
- Phytocoris torridus Stonedahl, 1988
- Phytocoris tragacanthae V. Putshkov, 1978
- Phytocoris transcaspicus Stichel, 1958
- Phytocoris translucidus Carvalho & Ferreira, 1986
- Phytocoris triannulatus Carvalho & Ferreira, 1969
- Phytocoris trichopterus Rieger, 1989
- Phytocoris tricinctipes Knight, 1968
- Phytocoris tricinctus Knight, 1968
- Phytocoris tridens Wagner, 1954
- Phytocoris trigonus Carapezza, 1997
- Phytocoris triodontus Kerzhner, 1962
- Phytocoris tripolitanus Wagner, 1968
- Phytocoris triumphalis Carvalho & Costa, 1990
- Phytocoris tuberculatus Knight, 1920
- Phytocoris tucki Knight, 1953
- Phytocoris tumidifrons Stonedahl, 1995
- Phytocoris turkestanicus Poppius, 1912
- Phytocoris turquinensis Hernandez & Stonedahl, 1997
- Phytocoris ulmi (Linnaeus, 1758)
- Phytocoris umbrosus Knight, 1928
- Phytocoris undulatus Reuter, 1877
- Phytocoris uniformis Knight, 1923
- Phytocoris usingeri Stonedahl, 1988
- Phytocoris ustulatus Herrich-Schaeffer, 1835
- Phytocoris utahensis Knight, 1961
- Phytocoris uzeli Poppius, 1911
- Phytocoris validus Reuter, 1909
- Phytocoris vallhonrati Ribes & Ribes, 1999
- Phytocoris vanduzeei Reuter, 1912
- Phytocoris varicornis Erichson, 1842
- Phytocoris variegatus (Distant, 1892)
- Phytocoris varipes Boheman, 1852
- Phytocoris varius Knight, 1934
- Phytocoris vau Van Duzee, 1912
- Phytocoris venezuelanus Carvalho & Costa, 1991
- Phytocoris ventralis Van Duzee, 1918
- Phytocoris venustus Knight, 1923
- Phytocoris veraguasinus Carvalho & Costa, 1991
- Phytocoris vetustus Germar & Berendt, 1856
- Phytocoris viberti Horvath, 1911
- Phytocoris vicuniensis Carvalho & Carpintero, 1989
- Phytocoris vigens (Uhler, 1894)
- Phytocoris vinaceus Van Duzee, 1917
- Phytocoris virescens Wagner, 1961
- Phytocoris viridescens Knight, 1961
- Phytocoris vittiger Reuter, 1896
- Phytocoris vossoroca Carvalho & Costa, 1991
- Phytocoris wagneri Kerzhner & Schuh, 1998
- Phytocoris weidneri Wagner, 1975
- Phytocoris westwoodi Bliven, 1966
- Phytocoris whiteheadi Stehlik, 1950
- Phytocoris wolongensis Xu & Zheng, 2001
- Phytocoris wudingensis Xu & Zheng, 2001
- Phytocoris xero Maldonado, 1991
- Phytocoris yavapai Stonedahl, 1988
- Phytocoris yollabollae Bliven, 1956
- Phytocoris yongpinganus Xu & Zheng, 2001
- Phytocoris yuma Knight, 1961
- Phytocoris zarudnyi Reuter, 1904
- Phytocoris zebra Wagner, 1975
- Phytocoris zhengi Nonnaizab & Jorigtoo, 1992
- Phytocoris zimganus Wagner, 1975
