= Proba californica =

Scientific classification
- Kingdom: Animalia
- Phylum: Arthropoda
- Class: Insecta
- Order: Hemiptera
- Suborder: Heteroptera
- Family: Miridae
- Tribe: Mirini
- Genus: Proba
- Species: P. californica

Binomial name
- Proba californica (Knight, 1968)

Species of true bug

Proba californica is a species of plant bug in the family Miridae. It is found in North America.
