= Bolteria amicta =

Scientific classification
- Kingdom: Animalia
- Phylum: Arthropoda
- Class: Insecta
- Order: Hemiptera
- Suborder: Heteroptera
- Family: Miridae
- Tribe: Mirini
- Genus: Bolteria
- Species: B. amicta

Binomial name
- Bolteria amicta Uhler, 1887

Species of true bug

Bolteria amicta is a species of plant bug in the family Miridae. It is found in North America.
