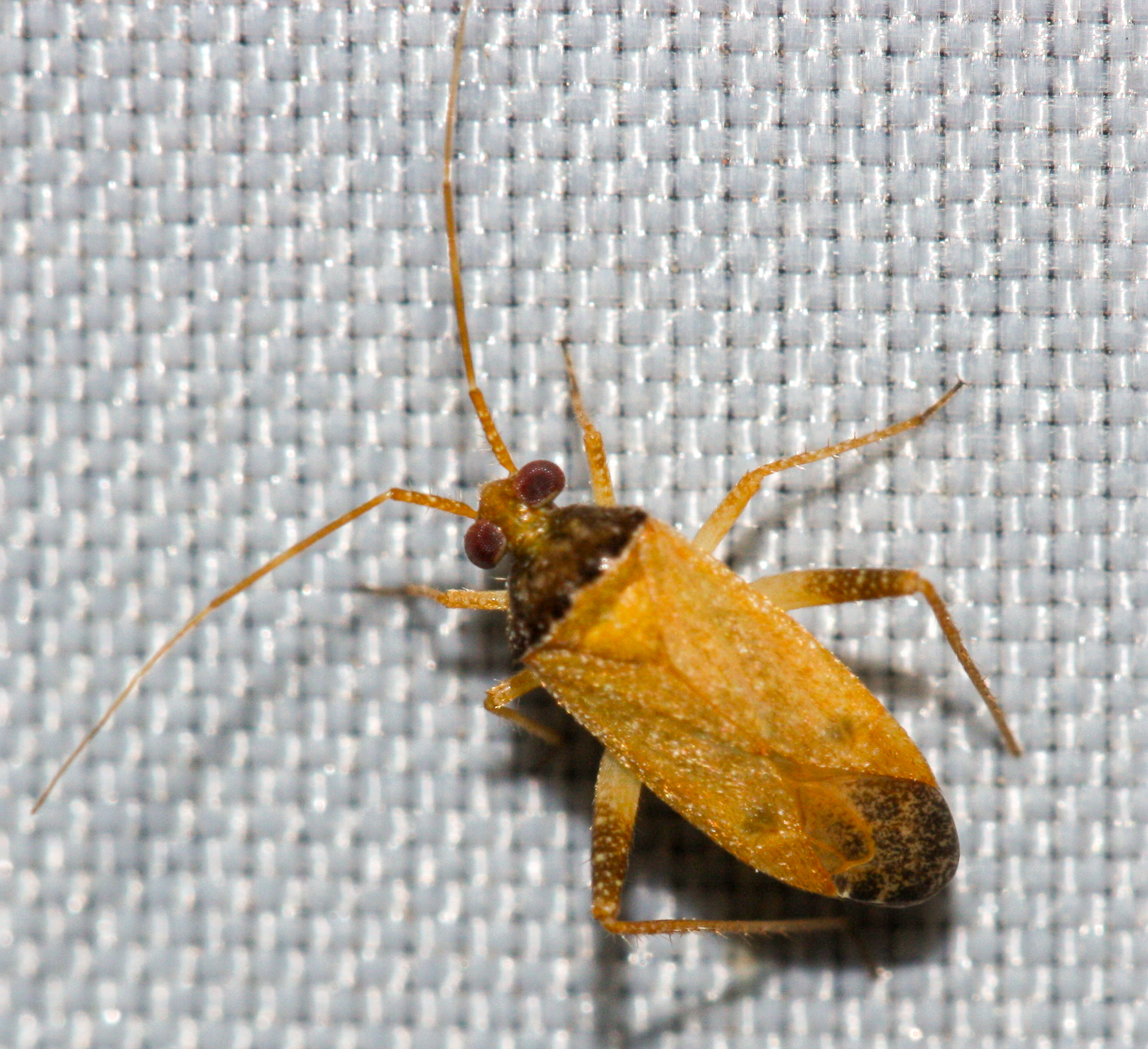
- Phytocoris ramosus, Arizona

Scientific classification
- Kingdom: Animalia
- Phylum: Arthropoda
- Class: Insecta
- Order: Hemiptera
- Suborder: Heteroptera
- Family: Miridae
- Tribe: Mirini
- Genus: Phytocoris
- Species: P. ramosus

Binomial name
- Phytocoris ramosus Uhler, 1894

= Phytocoris ramosus =

Species of true bug

Phytocoris ramosus is a species of plant bug in the family Miridae. It is found in Central America and North America.
