= Gracilimiris litoralis =

Scientific classification
- Kingdom: Animalia
- Phylum: Arthropoda
- Class: Insecta
- Order: Hemiptera
- Suborder: Heteroptera
- Family: Miridae
- Tribe: Mirini
- Genus: Gracilimiris
- Species: G. litoralis

Binomial name
- Gracilimiris litoralis Stonedahl & Henry, 1991

Species of true bug

Gracilimiris litoralis is a species of plant bug in the family Miridae. It is found in North America.
