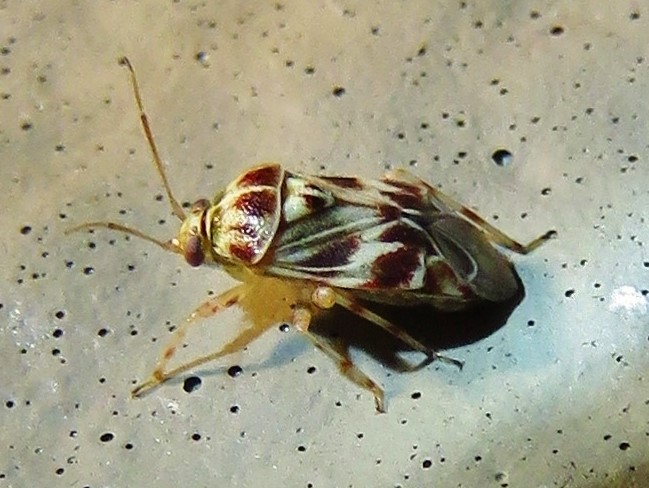

Scientific classification
- Kingdom: Animalia
- Phylum: Arthropoda
- Class: Insecta
- Order: Hemiptera
- Suborder: Heteroptera
- Family: Miridae
- Tribe: Mirini
- Genus: Tropidosteptes
- Species: T. quercicola

Binomial name
- Tropidosteptes quercicola (Johnston, 1939)

= Tropidosteptes quercicola =

Species of true bug

Tropidosteptes quercicola, the oak catkin mirid, is a species of plant bug in the family Miridae. It is found in North America.
