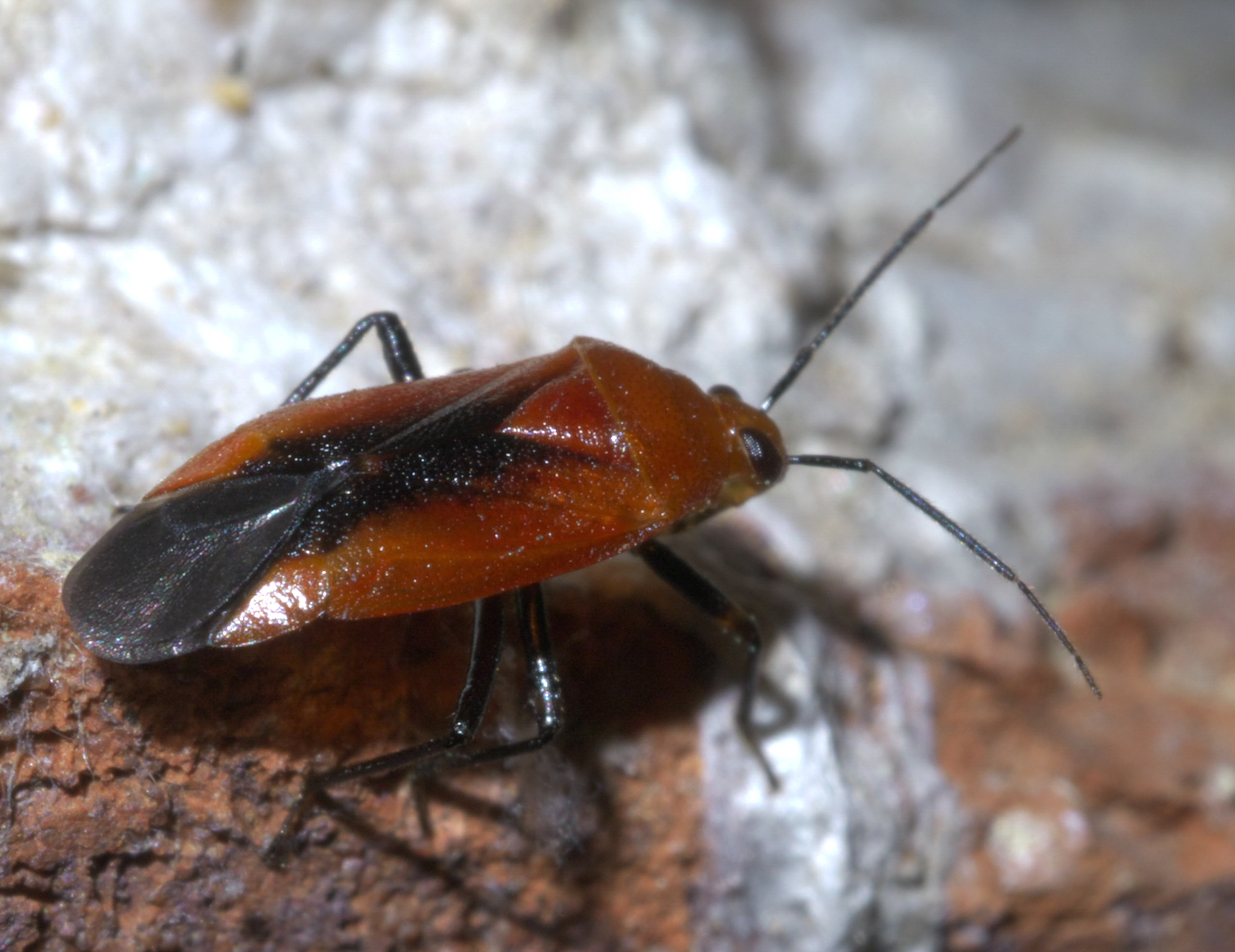

Scientific classification
- Kingdom: Animalia
- Phylum: Arthropoda
- Class: Insecta
- Order: Hemiptera
- Suborder: Heteroptera
- Family: Miridae
- Tribe: Mirini
- Genus: Tropidosteptes
- Species: T. cardinalis

Binomial name
- Tropidosteptes cardinalis Uhler, 1878

= Tropidosteptes cardinalis =

Species of true bug

Tropidosteptes cardinalis is a species of plant bug in the family Miridae. It is found in North America.

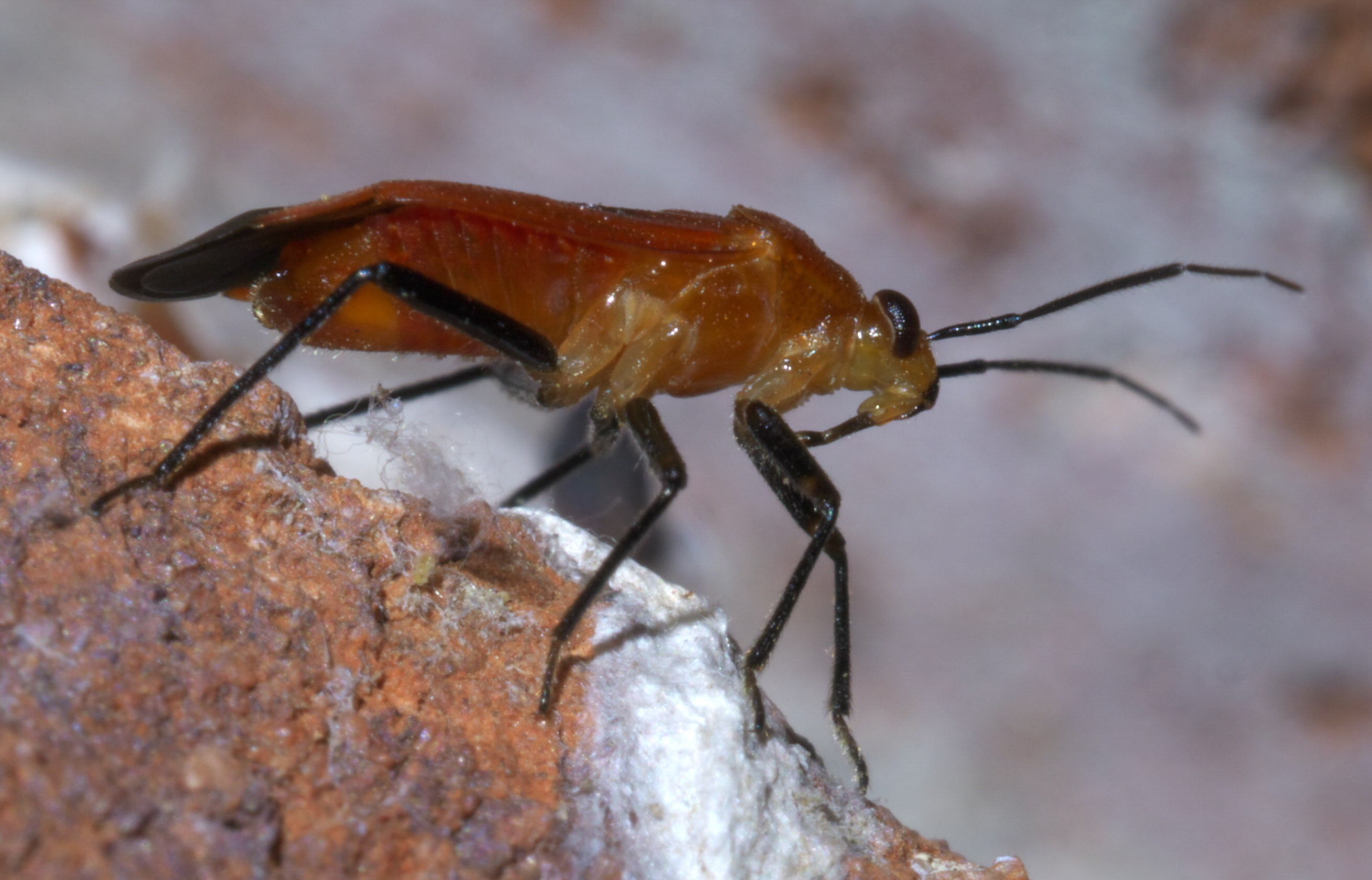
