= Tropidosteptes pubescens =

Scientific classification
- Kingdom: Animalia
- Phylum: Arthropoda
- Class: Insecta
- Order: Hemiptera
- Suborder: Heteroptera
- Family: Miridae
- Tribe: Mirini
- Genus: Tropidosteptes
- Species: T. pubescens

Binomial name
- Tropidosteptes pubescens (Knight, 1917)

Species of true bug

Tropidosteptes pubescens is a species of plant bug in the family Miridae. It is found in North America.
