= Lygidea rosacea =

Scientific classification
- Kingdom: Animalia
- Phylum: Arthropoda
- Class: Insecta
- Order: Hemiptera
- Suborder: Heteroptera
- Family: Miridae
- Tribe: Mirini
- Genus: Lygidea
- Species: L. rosacea

Binomial name
- Lygidea rosacea Reuter, 1909

Species of true bug

Lygidea rosacea is a species of plant bug in the family Miridae. It is found in North America.
