= Metriorrhynchomiris illini =

Scientific classification
- Kingdom: Animalia
- Phylum: Arthropoda
- Class: Insecta
- Order: Hemiptera
- Suborder: Heteroptera
- Family: Miridae
- Tribe: Mirini
- Genus: Metriorrhynchomiris
- Species: M. illini

Binomial name
- Metriorrhynchomiris illini (Knight, 1942)

Species of true bug

Metriorrhynchomiris illini is a species of plant bug in the family Miridae. It is found in North America.
