= Salignus tahoensis =

Scientific classification
- Kingdom: Animalia
- Phylum: Arthropoda
- Class: Insecta
- Order: Hemiptera
- Suborder: Heteroptera
- Family: Miridae
- Tribe: Mirini
- Genus: Salignus
- Species: S. tahoensis

Binomial name
- Salignus tahoensis (Knight, 1917)

Species of true bug

Salignus tahoensis is a species of plant bug in the family Miridae.
