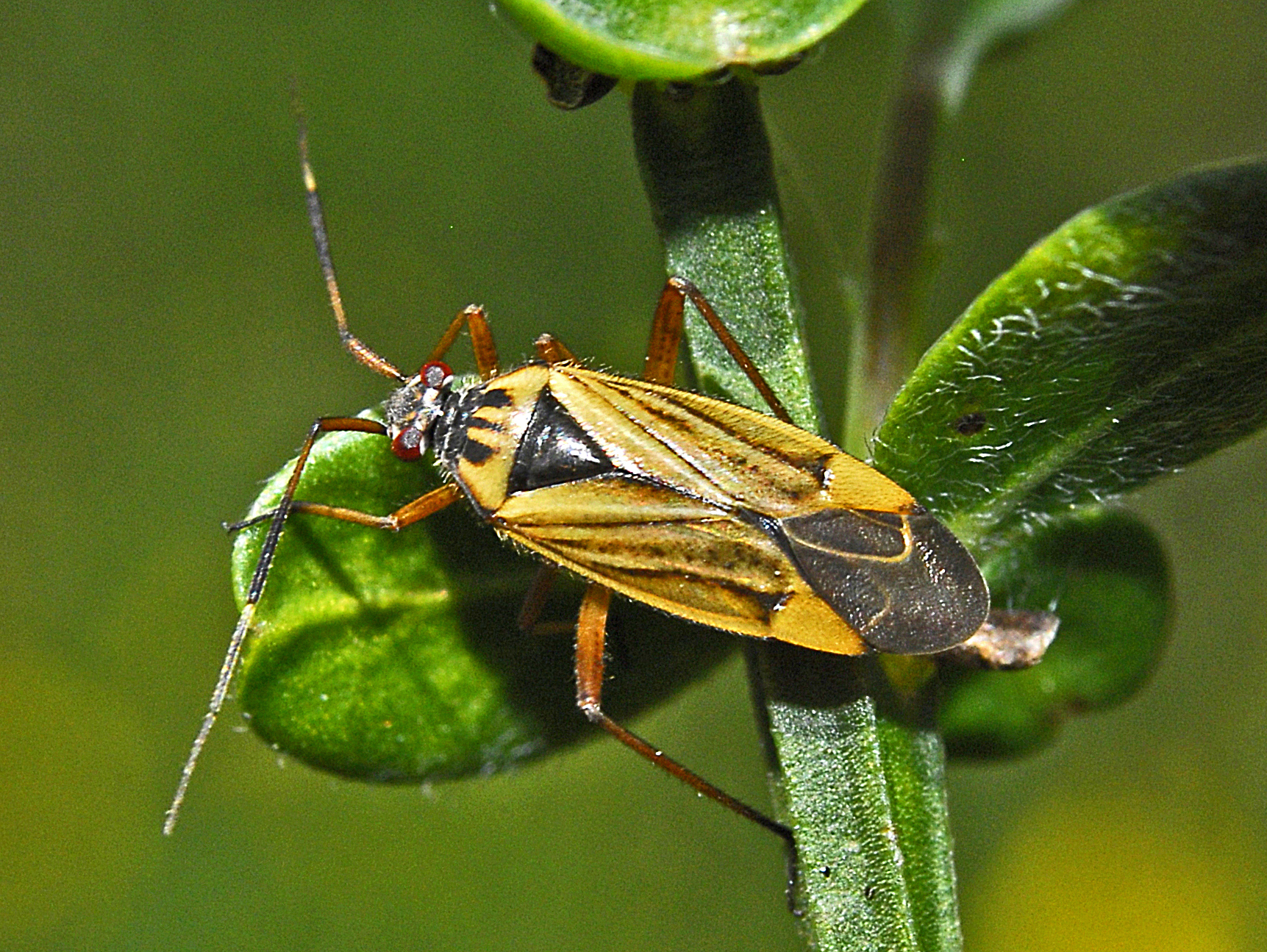

Scientific classification
- Kingdom: Animalia
- Phylum: Arthropoda
- Class: Insecta
- Order: Hemiptera
- Suborder: Heteroptera
- Family: Miridae
- Genus: Horwathia
- Species: H. lineolata

Binomial name
- Horwathia lineolata (A. Costa, 1862)

Synonyms
- Calocoris lineolatus (A. Costa, 1862)

= Horwathia lineolata =

Species of true bug

Horwathia lineolata is a species of bugs in the tribe Mirini, family Miridae.

== Distribution ==
This rare species is present in Austria, France, Germany, Liechtenstein, Italy and Switzerland.

== Habitat ==
These bugs inhabit high-montane and subalpine heights and are endemic to the Alps and the Apennines.

== Description ==
Horwathia lineolata can reach a length of about 7–8 millimetres (0.28–0.31 in). These small bugs have a black or dark brown scutellum and a brown membrane. The pronotum is yellowish with three dark brown markings. Hemelytra are yellowish, crossed by thin longitudinal brown lines (hence the Latin species name lineolata, from Latin lineola, diminutive of linea, meaning small line. Legs and antennae are reddish.

== Biology ==
Adults can be found from May to early June. The larvae are herbivores and live on species of the genus Luzula, especially on Luzula campestris.
