= Stittocapsus franseriae =

Scientific classification
- Kingdom: Animalia
- Phylum: Arthropoda
- Class: Insecta
- Order: Hemiptera
- Suborder: Heteroptera
- Family: Miridae
- Tribe: Mirini
- Genus: Stittocapsus
- Species: S. franseriae

Binomial name
- Stittocapsus franseriae Knight, 1942

Species of true bug

Stittocapsus franseriae is a species of plant bug in the family Miridae. It is found in North America.
