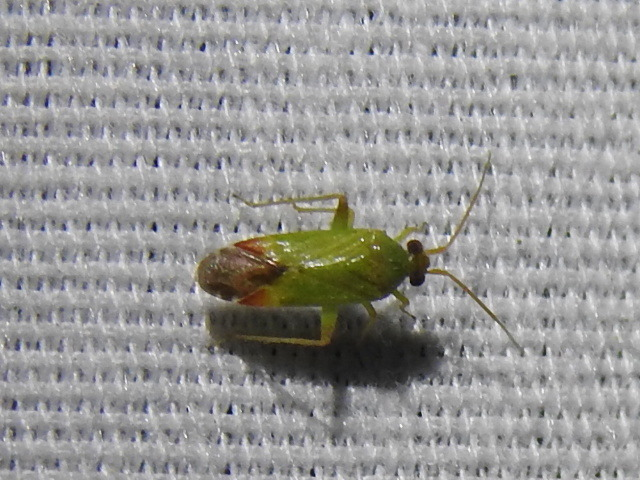
- Phytocoris vanduzeei, Texas

Scientific classification
- Kingdom: Animalia
- Phylum: Arthropoda
- Class: Insecta
- Order: Hemiptera
- Suborder: Heteroptera
- Family: Miridae
- Tribe: Mirini
- Genus: Phytocoris
- Species: P. vanduzeei

Binomial name
- Phytocoris vanduzeei Reuter, 1912

= Phytocoris vanduzeei =

Species of true bug

Phytocoris vanduzeei is a species of plant bug in the family Miridae. It is found in Central America and North America.
