= Dagbertus semipictus =

Scientific classification
- Kingdom: Animalia
- Phylum: Arthropoda
- Class: Insecta
- Order: Hemiptera
- Suborder: Heteroptera
- Family: Miridae
- Tribe: Mirini
- Genus: Dagbertus
- Species: D. semipictus

Binomial name
- Dagbertus semipictus (Blatchley, 1926)

Species of true bug

Dagbertus semipictus is a species of plant bug in the family Miridae. It is found in the Caribbean Sea and North America.
