= Tropidosteptes palmeri =

Scientific classification
- Kingdom: Animalia
- Phylum: Arthropoda
- Class: Insecta
- Order: Hemiptera
- Suborder: Heteroptera
- Family: Miridae
- Tribe: Mirini
- Genus: Tropidosteptes
- Species: T. palmeri

Binomial name
- Tropidosteptes palmeri (Reuter, 1908)

Species of true bug

Tropidosteptes palmeri is a species of plant bug in the family Miridae. It is found in North America.
