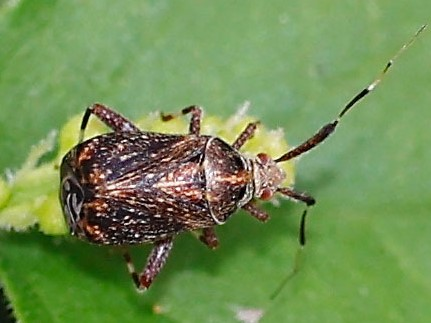

Scientific classification
- Kingdom: Animalia
- Phylum: Arthropoda
- Class: Insecta
- Order: Hemiptera
- Suborder: Heteroptera
- Family: Miridae
- Tribe: Mirini
- Genus: Lampethusa
- Species: L. nicholi

Binomial name
- Lampethusa nicholi Knight, 1933

= Lampethusa nicholi =

Species of true bug

Lampethusa nicholi is a species of plant bug in the family Miridae. It is found in North America.
