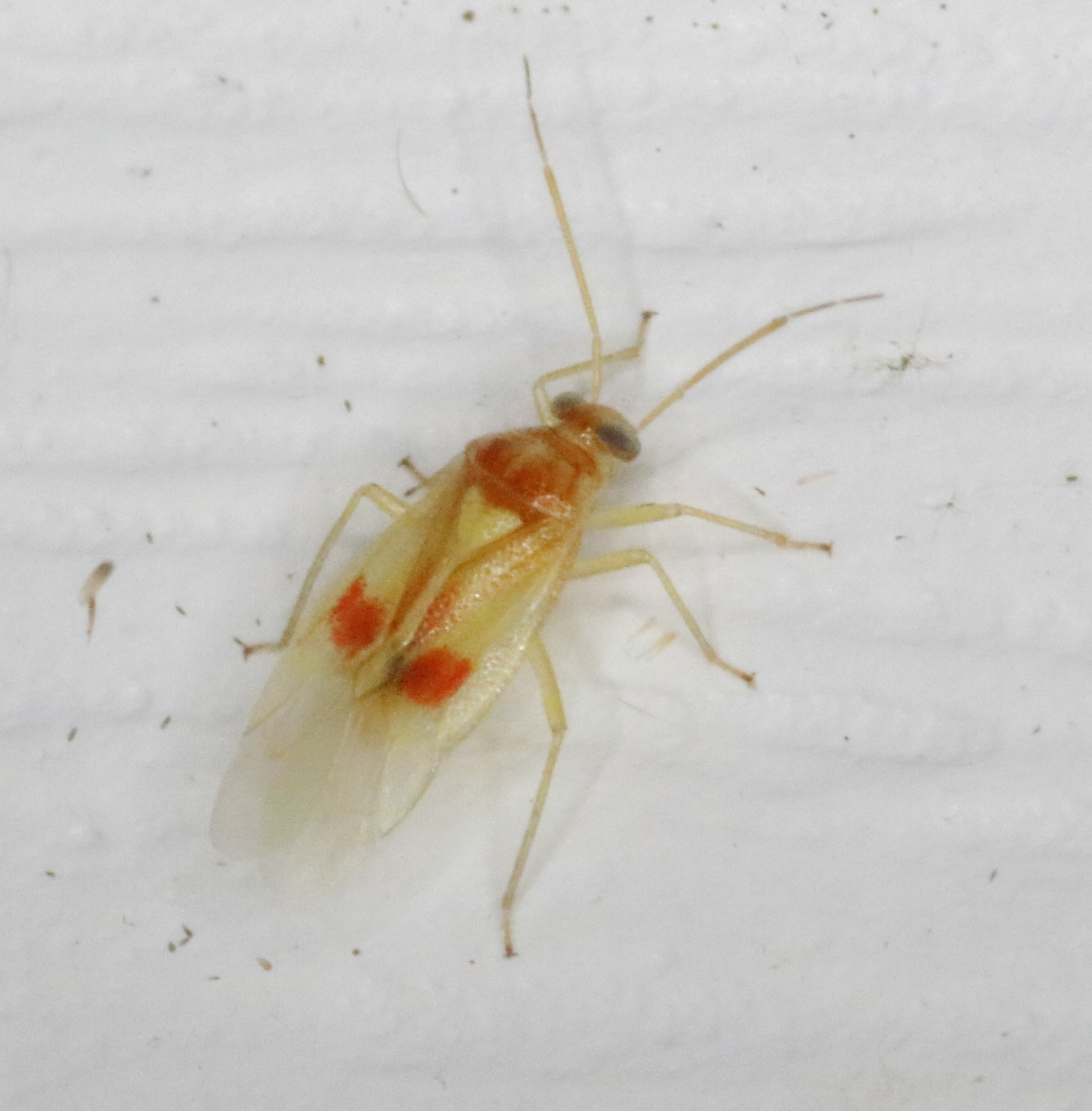

Scientific classification
- Kingdom: Animalia
- Phylum: Arthropoda
- Class: Insecta
- Order: Hemiptera
- Suborder: Heteroptera
- Family: Miridae
- Tribe: Mirini
- Genus: Tropidosteptes
- Species: T. amoenus

Binomial name
- Tropidosteptes amoenus Reuter, 1909

= Tropidosteptes amoenus =

Species of true bug

Tropidosteptes amoenus, the ash plant bug, is a species of plant bug in the family Miridae. It is found in North America.

== Subspecies ==
These six subspecies belong to the species Tropidosteptes amoenus:

- Tropidosteptes amoenus amoenus Reuter, 1909
- Tropidosteptes amoenus atriscutis (Knight, 1929)
- Tropidosteptes amoenus floridanus (Knight, 1929)
- Tropidosteptes amoenus plagiatus Reuter, 1909
- Tropidosteptes amoenus scutellaris Reuter, 1909
- Tropidosteptes amoenus signatus Reuter, 1909
