= Bolteria luteifrons =

Scientific classification
- Kingdom: Animalia
- Phylum: Arthropoda
- Clade: Pancrustacea
- Class: Insecta
- Order: Hemiptera
- Suborder: Heteroptera
- Family: Miridae
- Tribe: Mirini
- Genus: Bolteria
- Species: B. luteifrons

Binomial name
- Bolteria luteifrons Knight, 1921

Species of true bug

Bolteria luteifrons is a species of plant bug in the family Miridae. It is found in North America.
