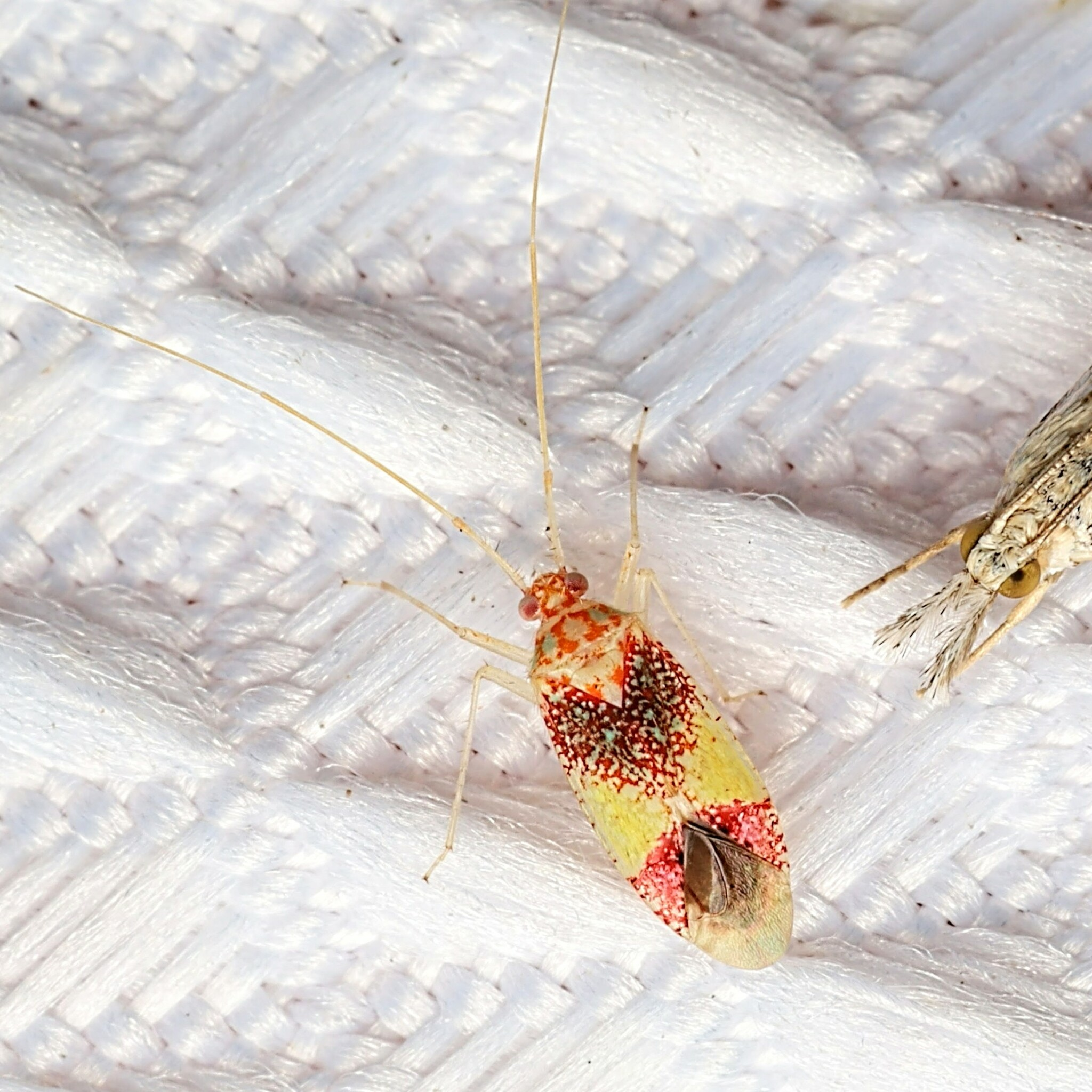
- In Maryland, US

Scientific classification
- Kingdom: Animalia
- Phylum: Arthropoda
- Class: Insecta
- Order: Hemiptera
- Suborder: Heteroptera
- Family: Miridae
- Tribe: Mirini
- Genus: Phytocoris
- Species: P. venustus

Binomial name
- Phytocoris venustus Knight, 1923

= Phytocoris venustus =

Species of true bug

Phytocoris venustus is a species of plant bug in the family Miridae. It is found in North America.
