= Henrylygus nubilus =

Scientific classification
- Kingdom: Animalia
- Phylum: Arthropoda
- Class: Insecta
- Order: Hemiptera
- Suborder: Heteroptera
- Family: Miridae
- Tribe: Mirini
- Genus: Henrylygus
- Species: H. nubilus

Binomial name
- Henrylygus nubilus (Van Duzee, 1914)

Synonyms
- Lygus nubilus Van Duzee, 1914

Species of true bug

Henrylygus nubilus is a species of plant bug in the family Miridae. It is found in Central America and North America.
