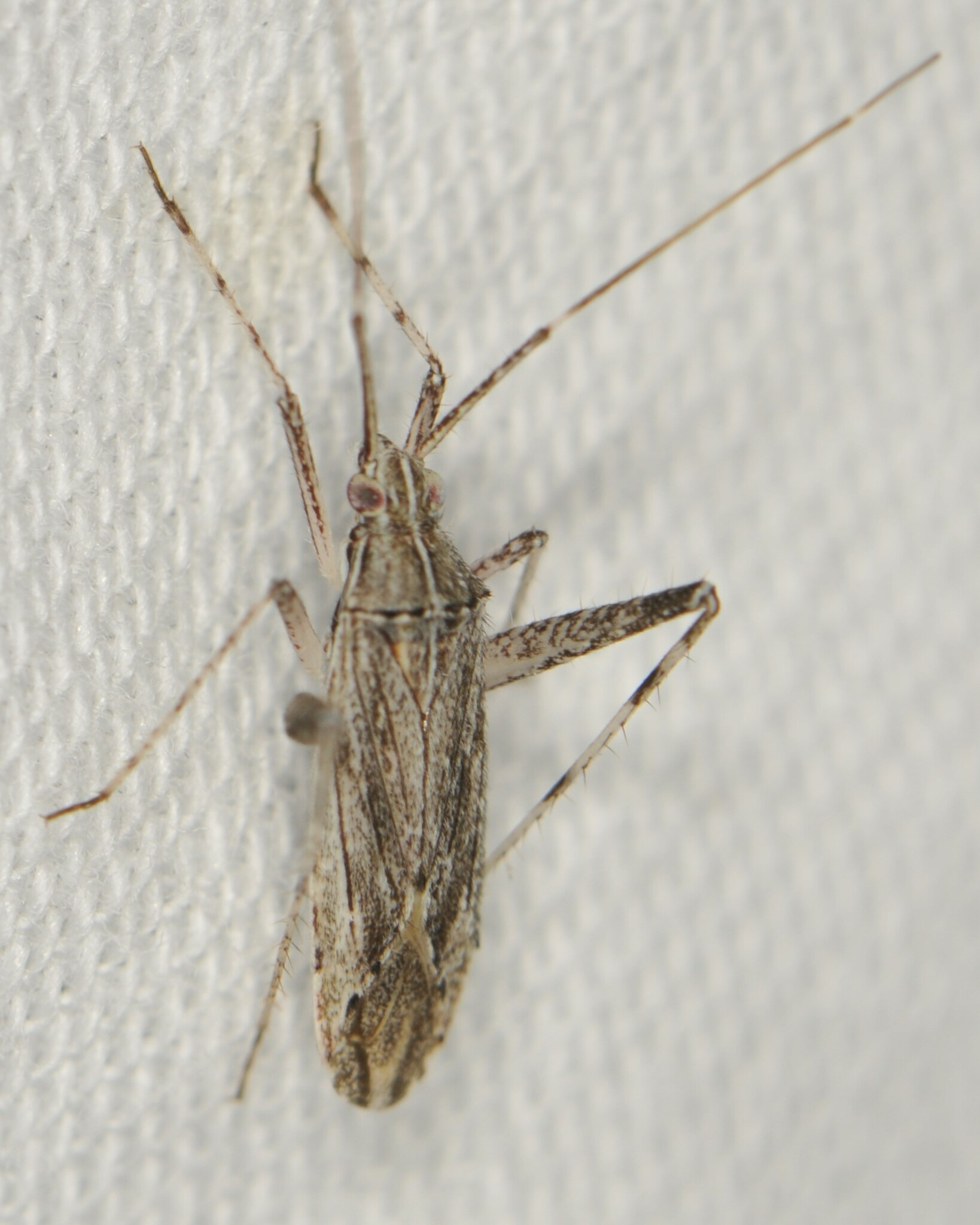
- Phytocoris pulchricollis, New Mexico

Scientific classification
- Kingdom: Animalia
- Phylum: Arthropoda
- Class: Insecta
- Order: Hemiptera
- Suborder: Heteroptera
- Family: Miridae
- Tribe: Mirini
- Genus: Phytocoris
- Species: P. pulchricollis

Binomial name
- Phytocoris pulchricollis Van Duzee, 1923

= Phytocoris pulchricollis =

Species of true bug

Phytocoris pulchricollis is a species of plant bug in the family Miridae. It is found in Central America and North America.
