= Phytocoris fuscipennis =

Scientific classification
- Kingdom: Animalia
- Phylum: Arthropoda
- Class: Insecta
- Order: Hemiptera
- Suborder: Heteroptera
- Family: Miridae
- Tribe: Mirini
- Genus: Phytocoris
- Species: P. fuscipennis

Binomial name
- Phytocoris fuscipennis Knight, 1934

Synonyms
- Phytocoris longirostris Knight, 1934

Species of true bug

Phytocoris fuscipennis is a species of plant bug in the family Miridae. It is found in North America.
