= Neoborella tumida =

Scientific classification
- Kingdom: Animalia
- Phylum: Arthropoda
- Class: Insecta
- Order: Hemiptera
- Suborder: Heteroptera
- Family: Miridae
- Tribe: Mirini
- Genus: Neoborella
- Species: N. tumida

Binomial name
- Neoborella tumida Knight, 1925

Species of true bug

Neoborella tumida is a species of plant bug in the family Miridae.
