= Proba distanti =

Scientific classification
- Kingdom: Animalia
- Phylum: Arthropoda
- Class: Insecta
- Order: Hemiptera
- Suborder: Heteroptera
- Family: Miridae
- Tribe: Mirini
- Genus: Proba
- Species: P. distanti

Binomial name
- Proba distanti (Atkinson, 1890)

Species of true bug

Proba distanti is a species of plant bug in the family Miridae. It is found in Central America and North America.
