= Bolteria =

- Bolteria speciosa

Scientific classification
- Kingdom: Animalia
- Phylum: Arthropoda
- Clade: Pancrustacea
- Class: Insecta
- Order: Hemiptera
- Suborder: Heteroptera
- Family: Miridae
- Subfamily: Mirinae
- Tribe: Mirini
- Genus: Bolteria; Uhler, 1887

Genus of true bugs

Bolteria is a genus of plant bugs in the family Miridae. There are about 18 species described in the genus Bolteria.

== Species ==
These 18 species belong to the genus Bolteria:

- Bolteria amicta Uhler, 1887
- Bolteria arizonae Knight, 1971
- Bolteria atricornis Kelton, 1972
- Bolteria balli Knight, 1928
- Bolteria dakotae Knight, 1971
- Bolteria juniperi Knight, 1968
- Bolteria luteifrons Knight, 1921
- Bolteria mexicana Kelton, 1972
- Bolteria nevadensis Knight, 1971
- Bolteria nicholi Knight, 1928
- Bolteria omani Knight, 1971
- Bolteria picta Schmidt
- Bolteria rubropallida Knight, 1918
- Bolteria schaffneri Knight, 1971
- Bolteria scutata Kelton, 1972
- Bolteria scutellata Kelton, 1972
- Bolteria siouxan Knight, 1971
- Bolteria speciosa (Van Duzee, 1916)
