= Lygidea mendax =

Scientific classification
- Kingdom: Animalia
- Phylum: Arthropoda
- Class: Insecta
- Order: Hemiptera
- Suborder: Heteroptera
- Family: Miridae
- Genus: Lygidea
- Species: L. mendax

Binomial name
- Lygidea mendax Reuter, 1909

Species of true bug

Lygidea mendax, the apple red bug, is a species of plant bug in the family Miridae. It is found in North America.
