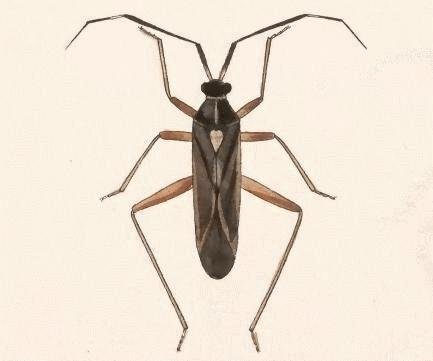

Scientific classification
- Kingdom: Animalia
- Phylum: Arthropoda
- Clade: Pancrustacea
- Class: Insecta
- Order: Hemiptera
- Suborder: Heteroptera
- Family: Miridae
- Subfamily: Mirinae
- Tribe: Mirini
- Genus: Garganus; Stål, 1862

= Garganus =

Genus of true bugs

Garganus is a genus of plant bugs in the family Miridae. There are about 12 described species in Garganus.

== Species ==
These 12 species belong to the genus Garganus:

- Garganus albidivittis Stål, 1862
- Garganus andinus Carvalho, 1992
- Garganus argentinus Carvalho & Carpintero, 1989
- Garganus diversicornis Knight & Carvalho, 1943
- Garganus fusiformis (Say, 1832)
- Garganus gracilentus (Stål, 1860)
- Garganus insularis Carvalho & Becker, 1957
- Garganus magnus Carvalho & Gomes, 1969
- Garganus saltensis (Berg, 1892)
- Garganus splendidus Distant, 1893
- Garganus venezuelanus Carvalho, 1992
- Garganus vilcanisensis Carvalho, 1992
