= Trichobasis =

Scientific classification
- Kingdom: Animalia
- Phylum: Arthropoda
- Class: Insecta
- Order: Hemiptera
- Suborder: Heteroptera
- Family: Miridae
- Tribe: Mirini
- Genus: Trichobasis

Genus of true bugs

Trichobasis is a genus of plant bugs in the tribe Mirini.
