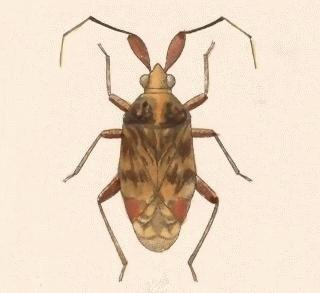
- Lampethusa anatina

Scientific classification
- Kingdom: Animalia
- Phylum: Arthropoda
- Clade: Pancrustacea
- Class: Insecta
- Order: Hemiptera
- Suborder: Heteroptera
- Family: Miridae
- Subfamily: Mirinae
- Tribe: Mirini
- Genus: Lampethusa; Distant, 1884

= Lampethusa =

Genus of true bugs

Lampethusa is a genus of plant bugs belonging to the Miridae family. There are about eight described species in Lampethusa.

== Species ==
These eight species belong to the genus Lampethusa:

- Lampethusa anatina Distant, 1884
- Lampethusa annulata (Distant, 1883)
- Lampethusa attenuata (Distant, 1883)
- Lampethusa collaris Reuter, 1909
- Lampethusa diamantina Carvalho, 1984
- Lampethusa nicholi Knight, 1933
- Lampethusa tupinambana Carvalho, 1977
- Lampethusa viannai Carvalho, 1947
