= Coccobaphes =

Scientific classification
- Kingdom: Animalia
- Phylum: Arthropoda
- Clade: Pancrustacea
- Class: Insecta
- Order: Hemiptera
- Suborder: Heteroptera
- Family: Miridae
- Tribe: Mirini
- Genus: Coccobaphes; Uhler, 1878
- Species: C. frontifer

Binomial name
- Coccobaphes frontifer (Walker, 1873)

Genus of true bugs

Coccobaphes is a genus of plant bugs in the family Miridae. There is one described species in Coccobaphes, C. frontifer.
