= Urucuiana =

Scientific classification
- Kingdom: Animalia
- Phylum: Arthropoda
- Class: Insecta
- Order: Hemiptera
- Suborder: Heteroptera
- Family: Miridae
- Tribe: Mirini
- Genus: Urucuiana

Genus of true bugs

Urucuiana is a genus of plant bugs in the tribe Mirini.
