= Ectopiocerus anthracinus =

Scientific classification
- Kingdom: Animalia
- Phylum: Arthropoda
- Clade: Pancrustacea
- Class: Insecta
- Order: Hemiptera
- Suborder: Heteroptera
- Family: Miridae
- Tribe: Mirini
- Genus: Ectopiocerus; Uhler, 1890
- Species: E. anthracinus

Binomial name
- Ectopiocerus anthracinus Uhler, 1890

Genus of true bugs

Ectopiocerus anthracinus is a monotypic species of plant bugs in the family Miridae.
