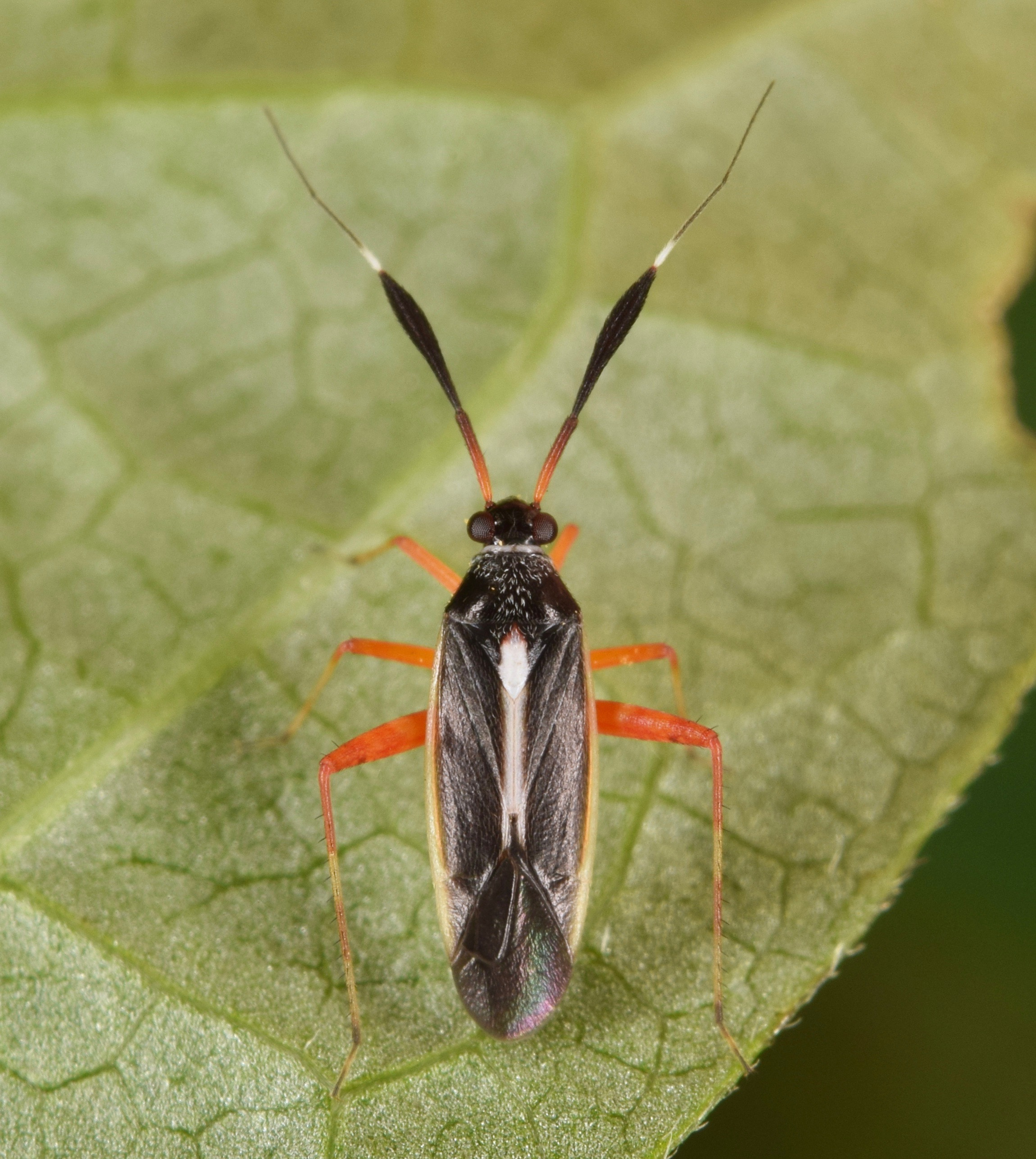

Scientific classification
- Kingdom: Animalia
- Phylum: Arthropoda
- Clade: Pancrustacea
- Class: Insecta
- Order: Hemiptera
- Suborder: Heteroptera
- Family: Miridae
- Genus: Garganus
- Species: G. fusiformis

Binomial name
- Garganus fusiformis (Say, 1832)

= Garganus fusiformis =

Species of true bug

Garganus fusiformis is a species of plant bug in the family Miridae. It is found in North America.
