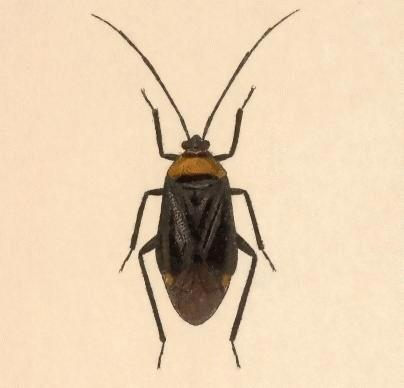

Scientific classification
- Kingdom: Animalia
- Phylum: Arthropoda
- Class: Insecta
- Order: Hemiptera
- Suborder: Heteroptera
- Family: Miridae
- Genus: Neocapsus
- Species: N. cuneatus

Binomial name
- Neocapsus cuneatus Distant, 1893

= Neocapsus cuneatus =

Species of true bug

Neocapsus cuneatus is a species of plant bug in the family Miridae. It is found in Central America and North America.
