= Apantilius =

Scientific classification
- Kingdom: Animalia
- Phylum: Arthropoda
- Class: Insecta
- Order: Hemiptera
- Suborder: Heteroptera
- Family: Miridae
- Subfamily: Mirinae
- Tribe: Mirini
- Genus: Apantilius; Kiritshenko, 1951
- Species: A. prasinus

Binomial name
- Apantilius prasinus (Fieber, 1870)

Synonyms
- Conometopus prasinus Fieber, 1870

Species of true bug

Apantilius prasinus is a species of true bug in the family Miridae. It is in the monotypic genus Apantilius.
