= Eurystylus bellevoyei =

Scientific classification
- Kingdom: Animalia
- Phylum: Arthropoda
- Class: Insecta
- Order: Hemiptera
- Suborder: Heteroptera
- Family: Miridae
- Genus: Eurystylus
- Species: E. bellevoyei

Binomial name
- Eurystylus bellevoyei (Reuter, 1879)

Synonyms
- Eurycyrtus bellevoyei

Species of true bug

Eurystylus bellevoyei is a species of true bug in the family Miridae with a wide distribution in the Old World. It feeds primarily on Chenopodiaceae plants. It is a serious pest of sorghum in Africa and India.
