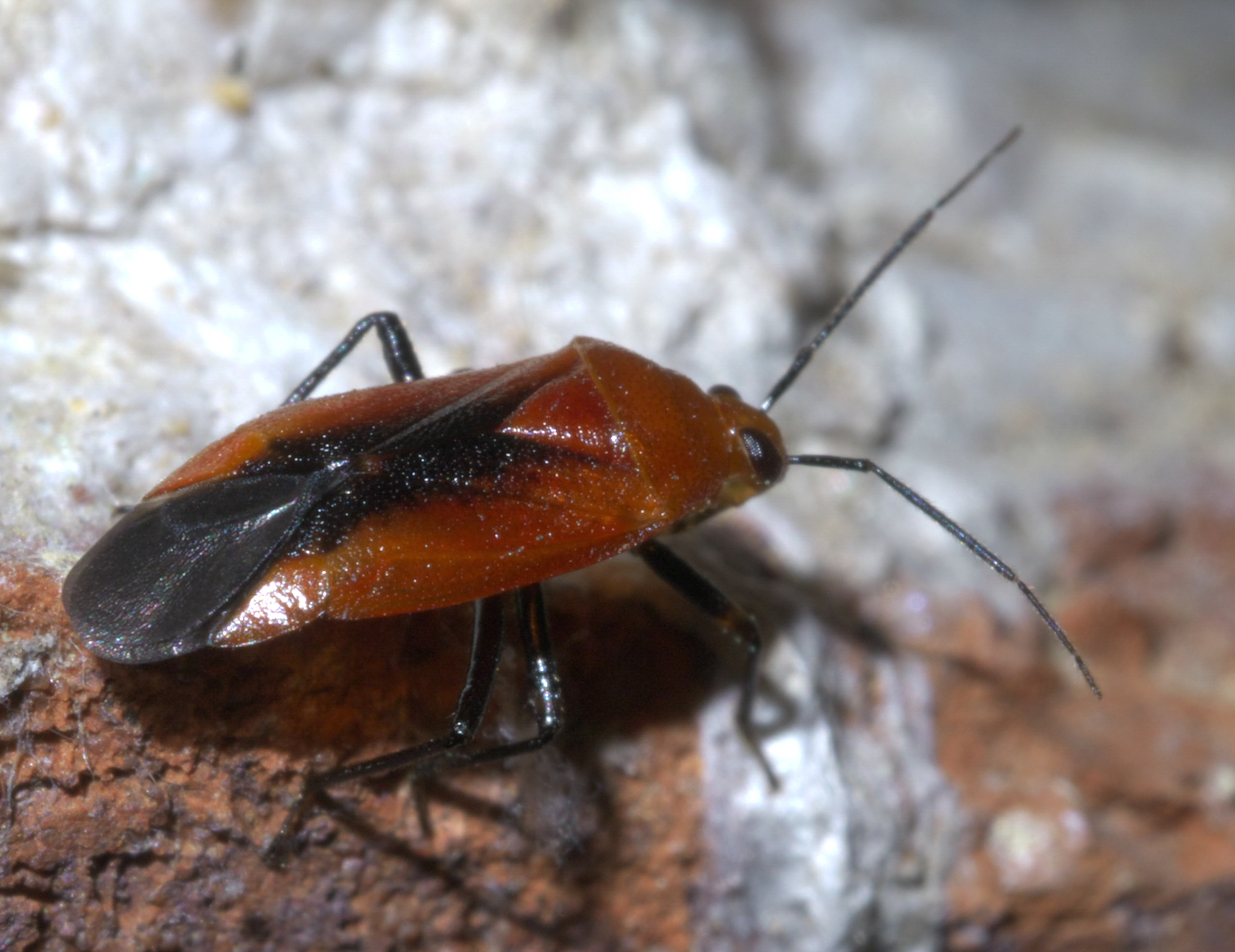
- Tropidosteptes cardinalis

Scientific classification
- Kingdom: Animalia
- Phylum: Arthropoda
- Class: Insecta
- Order: Hemiptera
- Suborder: Heteroptera
- Family: Miridae
- Tribe: Mirini
- Genus: Tropidosteptes; Uhler, 1878

Synonyms
- Neoborus Distant, 1884

= Tropidosteptes =

Genus of true bugs

Tropidosteptes is a genus of plant bugs in the family Miridae. There are at least 30 described species in Tropidosteptes.

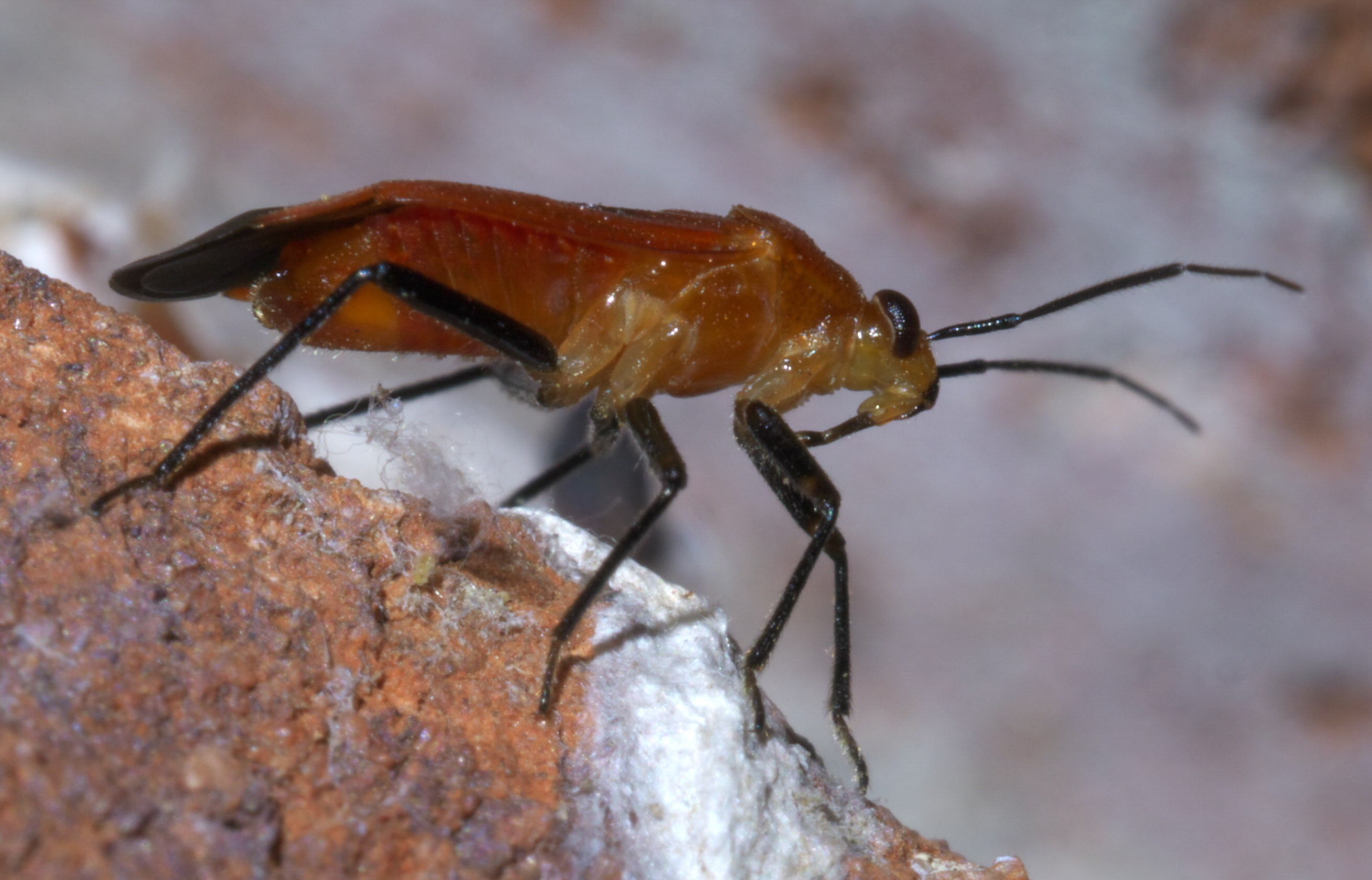
Tropidosteptes cardinalis

== Species ==
- Tropidosteptes adeliae (Knight, 1929)
- Tropidosteptes adustus (Knight, 1929)
- Tropidosteptes amoenus Reuter, 1909 (ash plant bug)
- Tropidosteptes atratus (Knight, 1929)
- Tropidosteptes brooksi Kelton, 1978
- Tropidosteptes canadensis Van Duzee, 1912
- Tropidosteptes cardinalis Uhler, 1878
- Tropidosteptes chionanthi (Knight, 1927)
- Tropidosteptes commissuralis (Reuter, 1908)
- Tropidosteptes fasciolus (Knight, 1929)
- Tropidosteptes flaviceps (Knight, 1929)
- Tropidosteptes geminus (Say, 1832)
- Tropidosteptes glaber (Knight, 1923)
- Tropidosteptes illitus (Van Duzee, 1921)
- Tropidosteptes imbellis Bliven, 1973
- Tropidosteptes neglectus (Knight, 1917)
- Tropidosteptes osmanthicola (Johnston, 1935)
- Tropidosteptes pacifica (Van Duzee, 1921)
- Tropidosteptes pacificus
- Tropidosteptes palmeri (Reuter, 1908)
- Tropidosteptes pettiti Reuter, 1909
- Tropidosteptes plagifer Reuter, 1909
- Tropidosteptes populi (Knight, 1929)
- Tropidosteptes pubescens (Knight, 1917)
- Tropidosteptes quercicola (Johnston, 1939) (oak catkin mirid)
- Tropidosteptes rufivenosus (Knight, 1929)
- Tropidosteptes rufusculus (Knight, 1923)
- Tropidosteptes saxeus (Distant, 1884)
- Tropidosteptes selectus (Knight, 1929)
- Tropidosteptes setiger Bliven, 1973
- Tropidosteptes torosus Bliven, 1973
- Tropidosteptes tricolor Van Duzee, 1912
- Tropidosteptes turgidulus Bliven, 1973
- Tropidosteptes viscicolus (Van Duzee, 1921)
- Tropidosteptes vittifrons (Knight, 1929)
- Tropidosteptes vittiscutis (Knight, 1929)
- Tropidosteptes wileyae (Knight, 1929)
- Tropidosteptes ygdrasilis Bliven, 1973
