= Pycnocoris =

Scientific classification
- Kingdom: Animalia
- Phylum: Arthropoda
- Clade: Pancrustacea
- Class: Insecta
- Order: Hemiptera
- Suborder: Heteroptera
- Family: Miridae
- Tribe: Mirini
- Genus: Pycnocoris; Van Duzee, 1914
- Species: P. ursinus

Binomial name
- Pycnocoris ursinus Van Duzee, 1914

Genus of true bugs

Pycnocoris is a genus of plant bugs in the family Miridae. There is one described species in Pycnocoris, P. ursinus.
