= Henrylygus =

Scientific classification
- Kingdom: Animalia
- Phylum: Arthropoda
- Class: Insecta
- Order: Hemiptera
- Suborder: Heteroptera
- Family: Miridae
- Subfamily: Mirinae
- Tribe: Mirini
- Genus: Henrylygus; Schwartz, 1998

Genus of true bugs

Henrylygus is a genus of plant bugs in the family Miridae. There are at least 2 described species in Henrylygus.

== Species ==
- Henrylygus nubilus (Van Duzee, 1914)
- Henrylygus ultranubilus (Knight, 1917)
