= Knightomiris =

Scientific classification
- Kingdom: Animalia
- Phylum: Arthropoda
- Clade: Pancrustacea
- Class: Insecta
- Order: Hemiptera
- Suborder: Heteroptera
- Family: Miridae
- Tribe: Mirini
- Genus: Knightomiris; Kelton, 1973
- Species: K. distinctus

Binomial name
- Knightomiris distinctus (Knight, 1917)

Genus of true bugs

Knightomiris is a genus of plant bugs in the family Miridae. There is one described species in Knightomiris, K. distinctus.
