= Stittocapsus =

Scientific classification
- Kingdom: Animalia
- Phylum: Arthropoda
- Clade: Pancrustacea
- Class: Insecta
- Order: Hemiptera
- Suborder: Heteroptera
- Family: Miridae
- Subfamily: Mirinae
- Tribe: Mirini
- Genus: Stittocapsus; Knight, 1942

Genus of true bugs

Stittocapsus is a genus of plant bugs in the family Miridae. There are at least three described species in Stittocapsus.

== Species ==
These three species belong to the genus Stittocapsus:

- Stittocapsus franseriae Knight, 1942
- Stittocapsus incaicus Carvalho, 1976
- Stittocapsus mexicanus Carvalho, 1974
