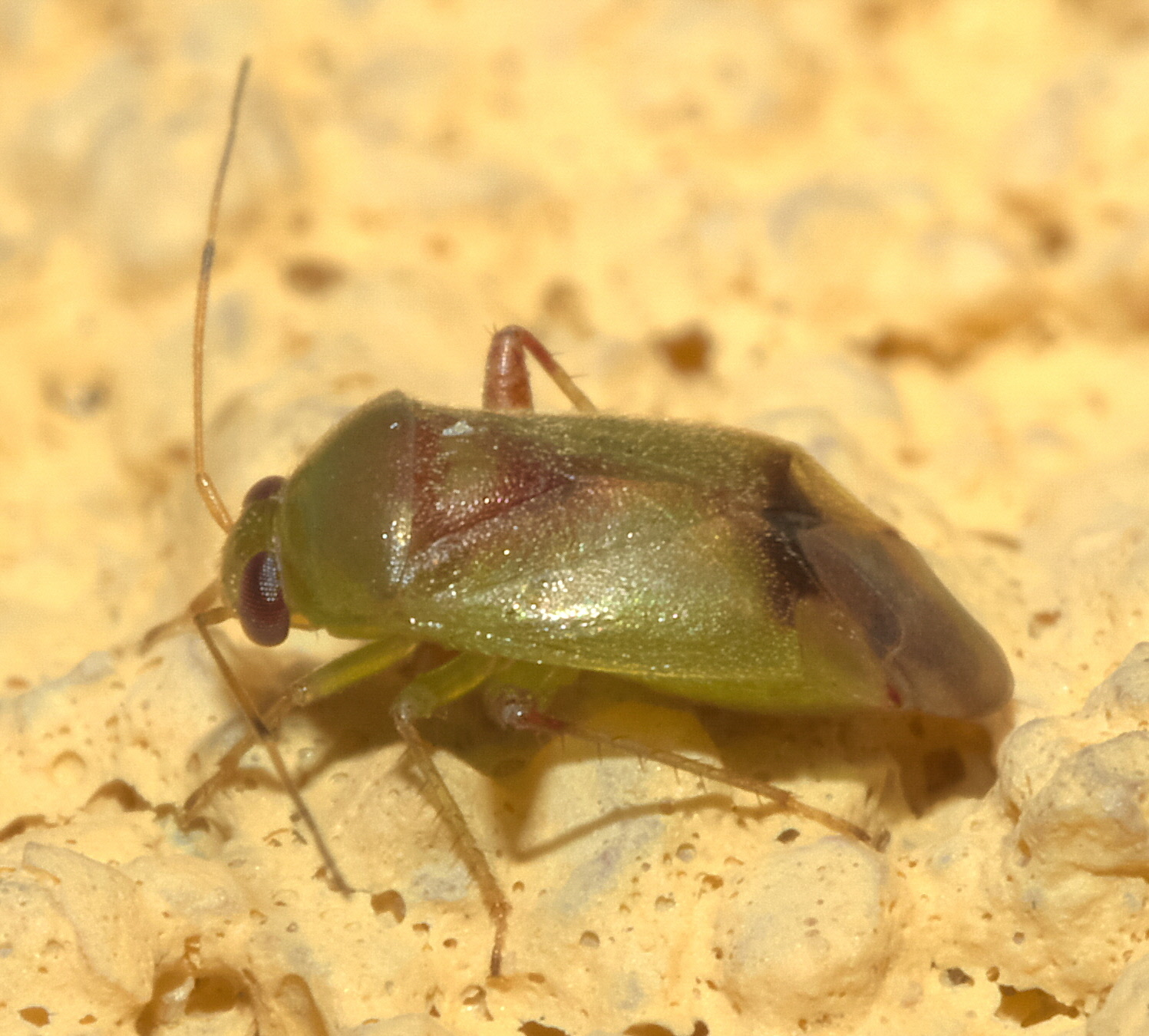
- Dagbertus olivaceus

Scientific classification
- Kingdom: Animalia
- Phylum: Arthropoda
- Clade: Pancrustacea
- Class: Insecta
- Order: Hemiptera
- Suborder: Heteroptera
- Family: Miridae
- Subfamily: Mirinae
- Tribe: Mirini
- Genus: Dagbertus; Distant, 1904

= Dagbertus =

Genus of true bugs

Dagbertus is a genus of plant bugs in the family Miridae. There are more than 40 described species in Dagbertus.

== Species ==
These 42 species belong to the genus Dagbertus:

- Dagbertus amapaensis Carvalho, 1988
- Dagbertus antillianus Carvalho & Fontes, 1983
- Dagbertus bahianus Carvalho, 1975
- Dagbertus bermudensis Carvalho & Fontes, 1983
- Dagbertus bonariensis (Stal, 1859)
- Dagbertus carabobensis Carvalho, 1987
- Dagbertus caraboensis Barros de Carvalho
- Dagbertus carmelitanus Carvalho & Fontes, 1983
- Dagbertus curacaoensis Carvalho & Fontes, 1983
- Dagbertus darwini (Butler, 1877)
- Dagbertus diamantinus Carvalho, 1984
- Dagbertus emboabanus Carvalho, 1985
- Dagbertus eustatiuensis Carvalho & Fontes, 1983
- Dagbertus fasciatus (Reuter, 1876)
- Dagbertus figuratus Gagne, 1968
- Dagbertus formosus Carvalho, 1968
- Dagbertus froeschneri Carvalho, 1985
- Dagbertus guaraniensis Carvalho & Fontes, 1983
- Dagbertus hospitus (Distant, 1893)
- Dagbertus insignis Carvalho, 1977
- Dagbertus irroratus (Blatchley, 1926)
- Dagbertus lineatus Gagne, 1968
- Dagbertus marmoratus Carvalho, 1968
- Dagbertus matogrossensis Carvalho & Fontes, 1983
- Dagbertus mexicanus Carvalho & Schaffner, 1973
- Dagbertus minensis Carvalho & Fontes, 1983
- Dagbertus nigrifrons Gagne, 1968
- Dagbertus oaxacensis Carvalho & Fontes, 1983
- Dagbertus obscurus Carvalho & Fontes, 1983
- Dagbertus olivaceus (Reuter, 1907)
- Dagbertus pallidus Gagne, 1968
- Dagbertus paraensis Carvalho, 1980
- Dagbertus pellitus (Distant, 1893)
- Dagbertus peruanus Carvalho, 1985
- Dagbertus phaleratus (Berg, 1892)
- Dagbertus potosianus Carvalho & Fontes, 1983
- Dagbertus quadrinotatus (Walker, 1873)
- Dagbertus salvadorensis Carvalho, 1985
- Dagbertus semipictus (Blatchley, 1926)
- Dagbertus sinopensis Carvalho & Fontes, 1983
- Dagbertus spoliatus (Walker, 1873)
- Dagbertus suspectus (Reuter, 1907)
