= Garganus splendidus =

Scientific classification
- Kingdom: Animalia
- Phylum: Arthropoda
- Class: Insecta
- Order: Hemiptera
- Suborder: Heteroptera
- Family: Miridae
- Genus: Garganus
- Species: G. splendidus

Binomial name
- Garganus splendidus Distant, 1893

Species of true bug

Garganus splendidus is a species of plant bug in the family Miridae. It is found in Central America and North America.
