= Henrylygus ultranubilus =

Scientific classification
- Kingdom: Animalia
- Phylum: Arthropoda
- Class: Insecta
- Order: Hemiptera
- Suborder: Heteroptera
- Family: Miridae
- Genus: Henrylygus
- Species: H. ultranubilus

Binomial name
- Henrylygus ultranubilus (Knight, 1917)

Species of true bug

Henrylygus ultranubilus is a species of plant bug in the family Miridae. It is found in North America.
