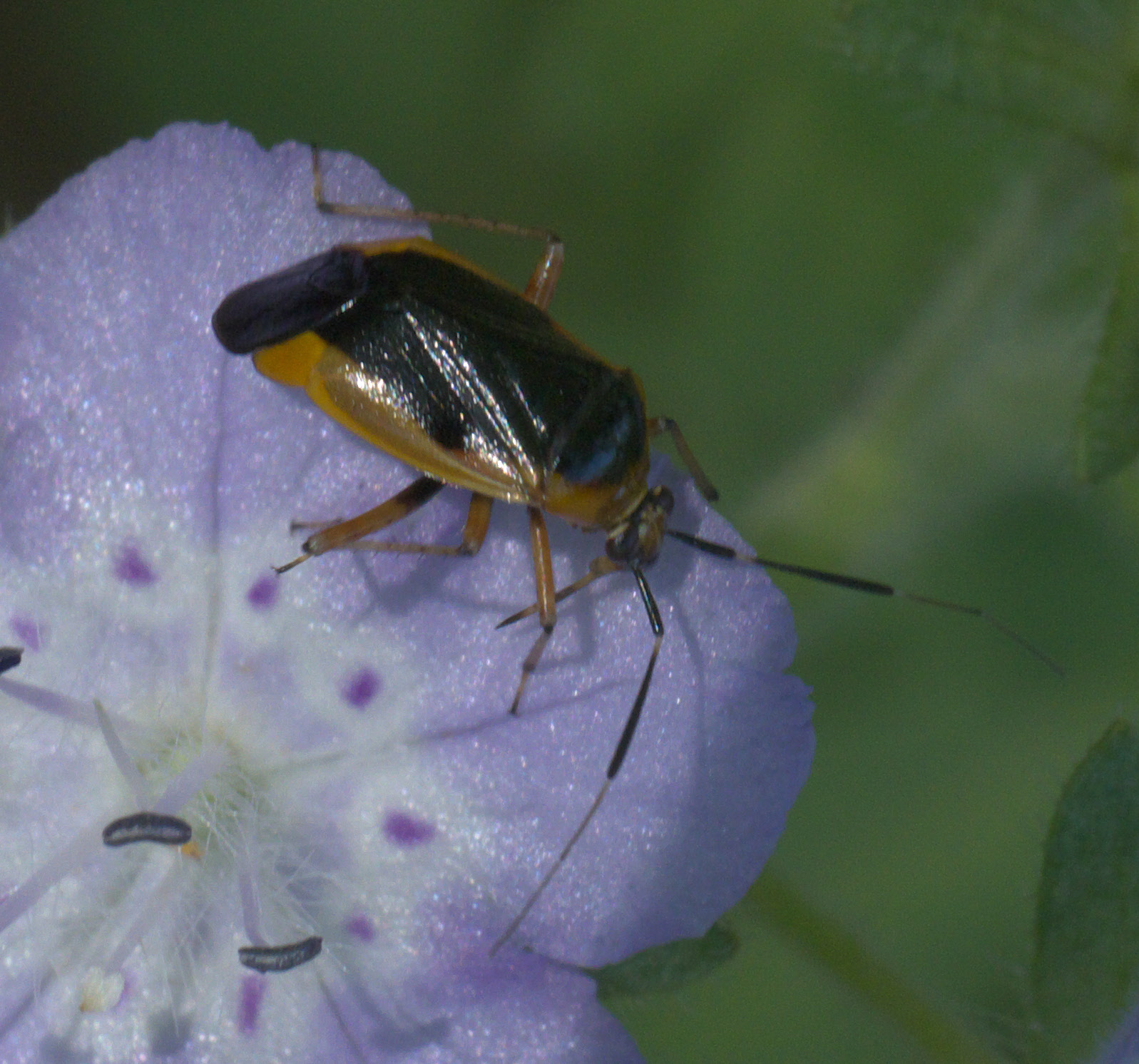
- Metriorrhynchomiris dislocatus

Scientific classification
- Kingdom: Animalia
- Phylum: Arthropoda
- Clade: Pancrustacea
- Class: Insecta
- Order: Hemiptera
- Suborder: Heteroptera
- Family: Miridae
- Subfamily: Mirinae
- Tribe: Mirini
- Genus: Metriorrhynchomiris; Kirkaldy, 1904

= Metriorrhynchomiris =

Genus of true bugs

Metriorrhynchomiris is a genus of plant bugs in the family Miridae. There are at least three described species in Metriorrhynchomiris.

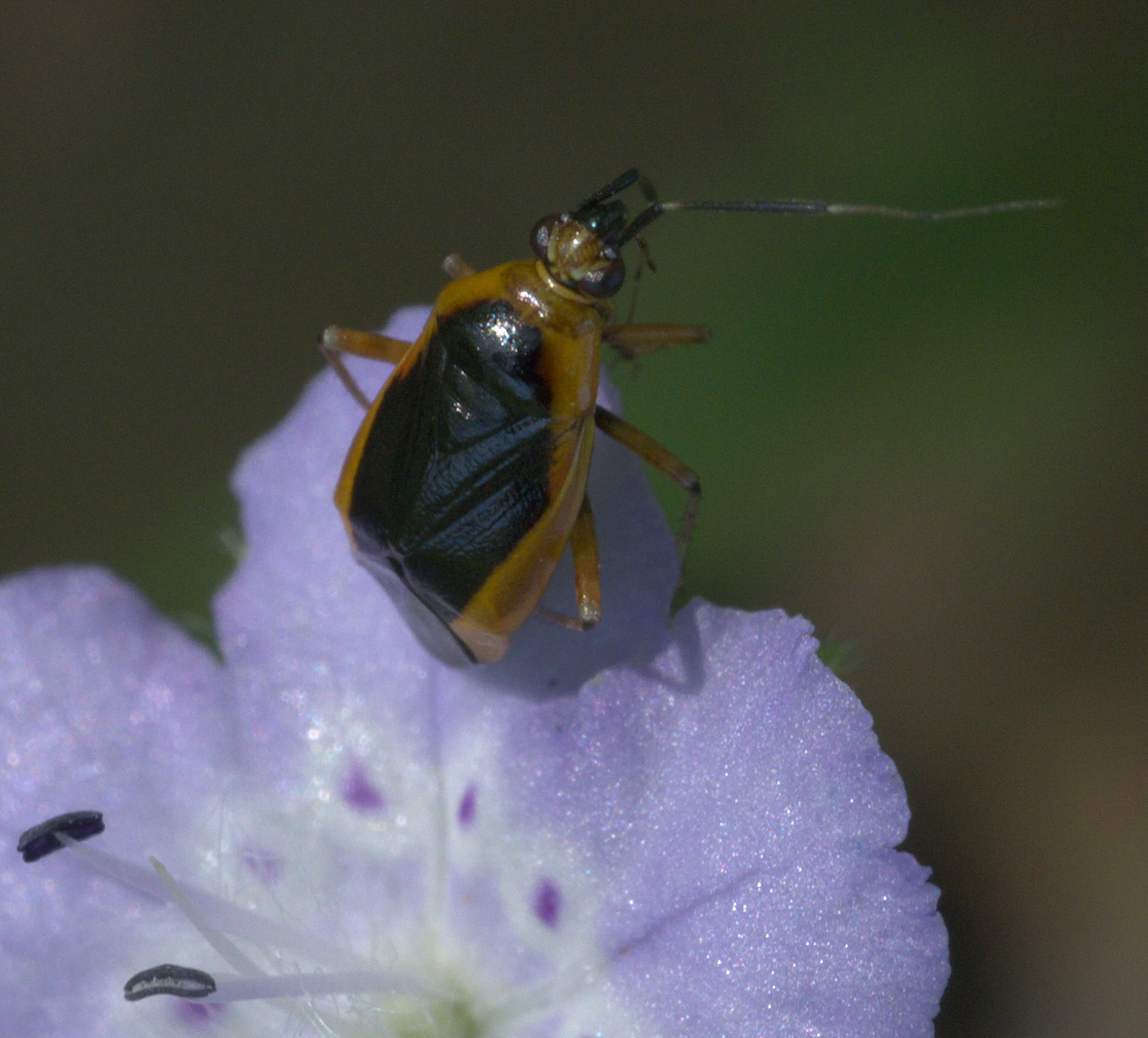
Metriorrhynchomiris dislocatus

== Species ==
These three species belong to the genus Metriorrhynchomiris:

- Metriorrhynchomiris dislocatus (Say, 1832)
- Metriorrhynchomiris fallax (Reuter, 1909)
- Metriorrhynchomiris illini (Knight, 1942)
