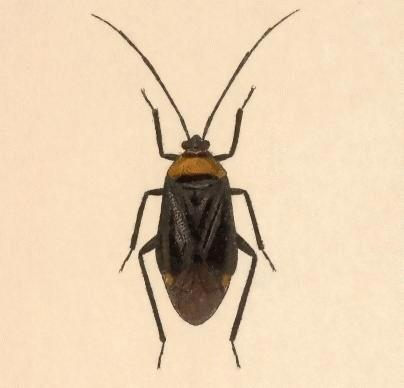
- Neocapsus cuneatus

Scientific classification
- Kingdom: Animalia
- Phylum: Arthropoda
- Clade: Pancrustacea
- Class: Insecta
- Order: Hemiptera
- Suborder: Heteroptera
- Family: Miridae
- Subfamily: Mirinae
- Tribe: Mirini
- Genus: Neocapsus; Distant, 1884

= Neocapsus =

Genus of true bugs

Neocapsus is a genus of plant bugs in the family Miridae. There are about six described species in Neocapsus.

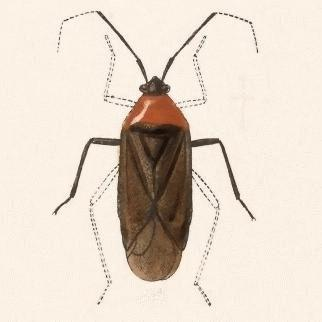
Neocapsus mexicanus

== Species ==
These six species belong to the genus Neocapsus:

- Neocapsus agrarius (Distant, 1884)
- Neocapsus cuneatus Distant, 1893
- Neocapsus fasciativentris (Stål, 1862)
- Neocapsus leviscutatus Knight, 1925
- Neocapsus mexicanus Distant, 1893
- Neocapsus zopilotes Carvalho, 1987
