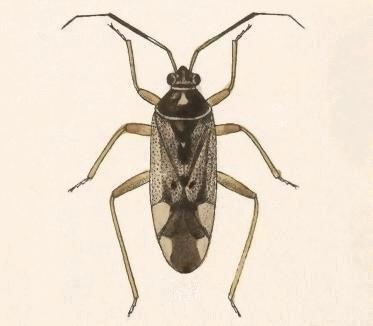
- Proba gracilis

Scientific classification
- Kingdom: Animalia
- Phylum: Arthropoda
- Class: Insecta
- Order: Hemiptera
- Suborder: Heteroptera
- Family: Miridae
- Tribe: Mirini
- Genus: Proba; Distant, 1884

= Proba (bug) =

Genus of true bugs

Proba is a genus of plant bugs in the family Miridae. There are at least 20 described species in the genus Proba.

== Species ==
These 22 species belong to the genus Proba:

- Proba aeruginata (Bergroth, 1910)^{c g}
- Proba californica (Knight, 1968)^{i c g b}
- Proba distanti (Atkinson, 1890)^{i c g b}
- Proba elquiensis (Blanchard, 1852)^{c g}
- Proba fraudulenta (Stål, 1860)^{c g}
- Proba froeschneri Carvalho, 1986^{c g}
- Proba gracilioides Carvalho and Costa, 1989^{c g}
- Proba gracilis Distant, 1884^{i c g}
- Proba hyalina Maldonado, 1969^{i}
- Proba inspersa (Distant, 1884)^{c g}
- Proba missionera Carvalho and Carpintero, 1986^{c g}
- Proba nigra Carvalho and Carpintero, 1989^{c g}
- Proba plagifer (Reuter, 1908)^{c g}
- Proba sallei (Stål, 1862)^{i c g}
- Proba saltensis Carvalho and Costa, 1989^{c g}
- Proba signaticeps (Reuter, 1908)^{c g}
- Proba tacta (Distant, 1884)^{c g}
- Proba tactilis (Distant, 1893)^{c g}
- Proba vicarius (Reuter, 1908)^{c g}
- Proba vicinus (Blanchard, 1852)^{c g}
- Proba vinaceus (Distant, 1884)^{c g}
- Proba vittiscutis (Stål, 1860)^{i c g}

Data sources: i = ITIS, c = Catalogue of Life, g = GBIF, b = Bugguide.net
