= Nonlygus =

Scientific classification
- Kingdom: Animalia
- Phylum: Arthropoda
- Clade: Pancrustacea
- Class: Insecta
- Order: Hemiptera
- Suborder: Heteroptera
- Family: Miridae
- Tribe: Mirini
- Genus: Nonlygus; Schwartz in Schwartz & Foottit, 1998

Genus of true bugs

Nonlygus is a genus of plant bugs in the family Miridae. There is at least one described species in Nonlygus, N. nubilatus.
