= Lygidea =

Scientific classification
- Kingdom: Animalia
- Phylum: Arthropoda
- Class: Insecta
- Order: Hemiptera
- Suborder: Heteroptera
- Family: Miridae
- Tribe: Mirini
- Genus: Lygidea; Reuter, 1879

Genus of true bugs

Lygidea is a genus of plant bugs in the family Miridae. There are about 10 described species in Lygidea.

== Species ==
- Listronotus distinctus Henderson LS, 1941
- Lygidea annexa (Uhler, 1872)
- Lygidea essigi Van Duzee, 1925
- Lygidea illota (Stål, 1858)
- Lygidea mendax Reuter, 1909 (apple red bug)
- Lygidea obscura Reuter, 1909
- Lygidea rosacea Reuter, 1909
- Lygidea rubecula (Uhler, 1895)
- Lygidea salicis Knight, 1939
- Lygidea viburni Knight, 1923
