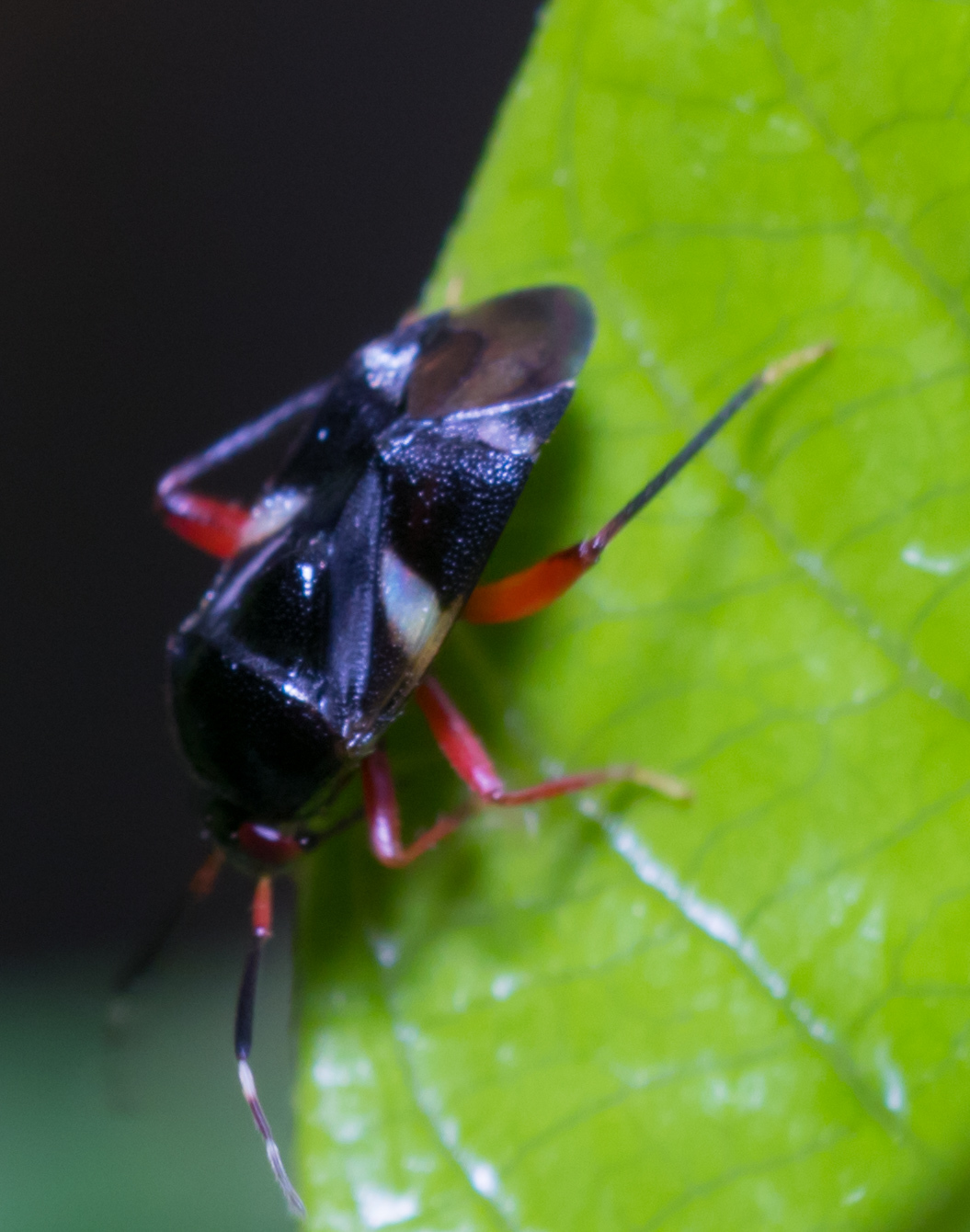
- Bertsa lankana

Scientific classification
- Kingdom: Animalia
- Phylum: Arthropoda
- Class: Insecta
- Order: Hemiptera
- Suborder: Heteroptera
- Family: Miridae
- Tribe: Mirini
- Genus: Bertsa; Kirkaldy, 1904

Synonyms
- Berta Kirkaldy 1902

= Bertsa =

Genus of true bugs

Bertsa is a genus of true bugs in the family Miridae.

== Characteristics ==
Elongated oval shaped body, antenna with four segments. The white band on the dorsal of the insect marks the difference between this genus with others within the same tribus.

== Distribution ==
This genus is distributed in warmer area of East Asia, South East Asia and South Asia. They have been found from Japan to South Korea, Mainland China and Hong Kong。

== Species ==
So far only two species have been described:

- Bertsa lankana (Kirby, 1891): Seen only in the warmest provinces of South Korea, southern provinces of Mainland China, Taiwan, as well as the area spanning from Indonesia to Sri Lanka.
- Bertsa major Zheng, 2004
