= Salignus =

Scientific classification
- Kingdom: Animalia
- Phylum: Arthropoda
- Clade: Pancrustacea
- Class: Insecta
- Order: Hemiptera
- Suborder: Heteroptera
- Family: Miridae
- Subfamily: Mirinae
- Tribe: Mirini
- Genus: Salignus; Kelton, 1955

Genus of true bugs

Salignus is a genus of plant bugs in the family Miridae. There are at least three described species in Salignus.

== Species ==
These three species belong to the genus Salignus:

- Salignus distinguendus (Reuter, 1875)
- Salignus duplicatus (Reuter, 1906)
- Salignus tahoensis (Knight, 1917)
