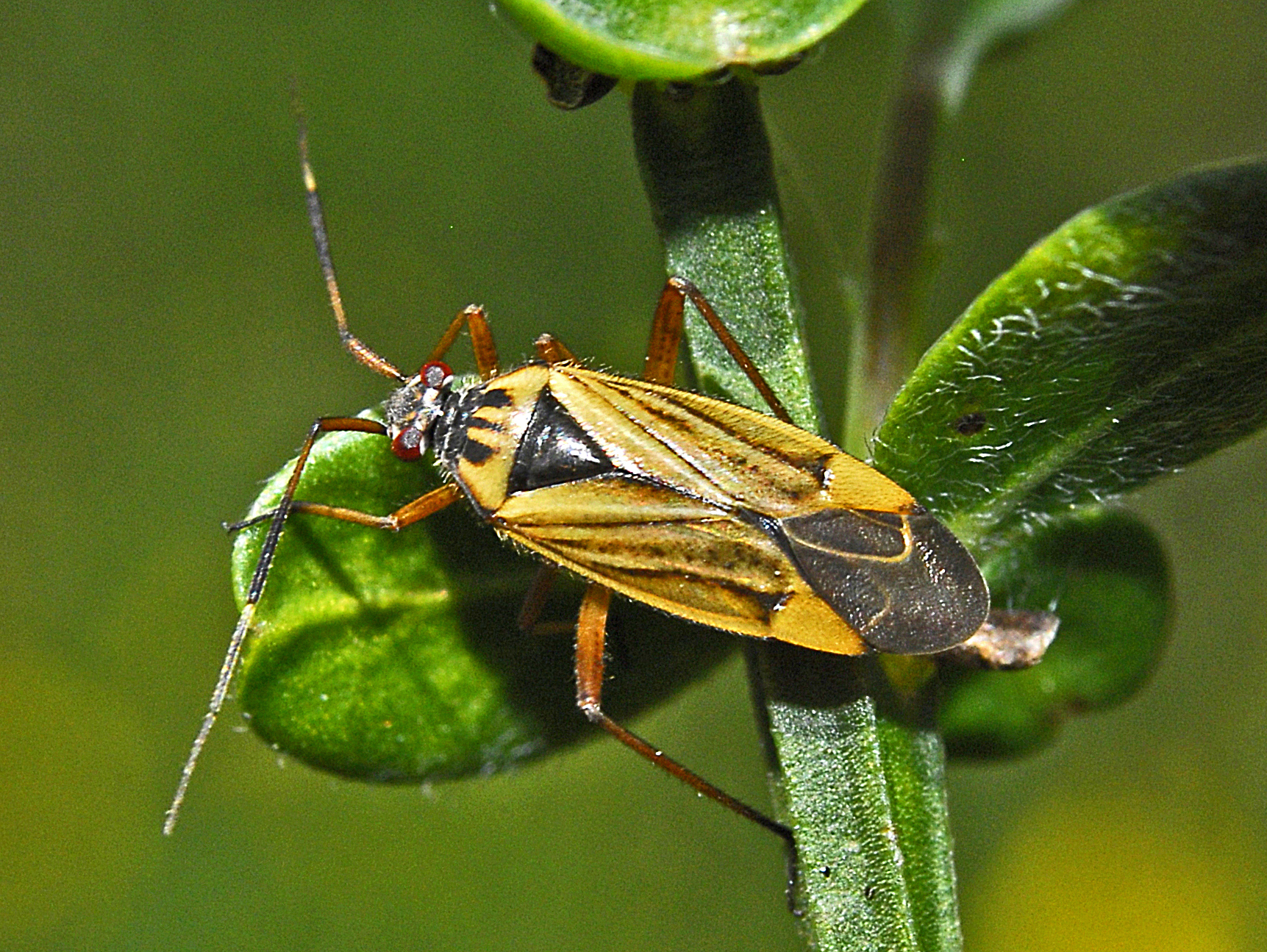
- Horwathia lineolata

Scientific classification
- Kingdom: Animalia
- Phylum: Arthropoda
- Class: Insecta
- Order: Hemiptera
- Suborder: Heteroptera
- Family: Miridae
- Tribe: Mirini
- Genus: Horwathia; Reuter, 1881

= Horwathia =

Genus of true bugs

Horwathia is a genus of bugs in the tribe Mirini, family Miridae.

== Species ==
- Horwathia hieroglyphica (Mulsant & Rey, 1852)
- Horwathia lineolata (A. Costa, 1862)
