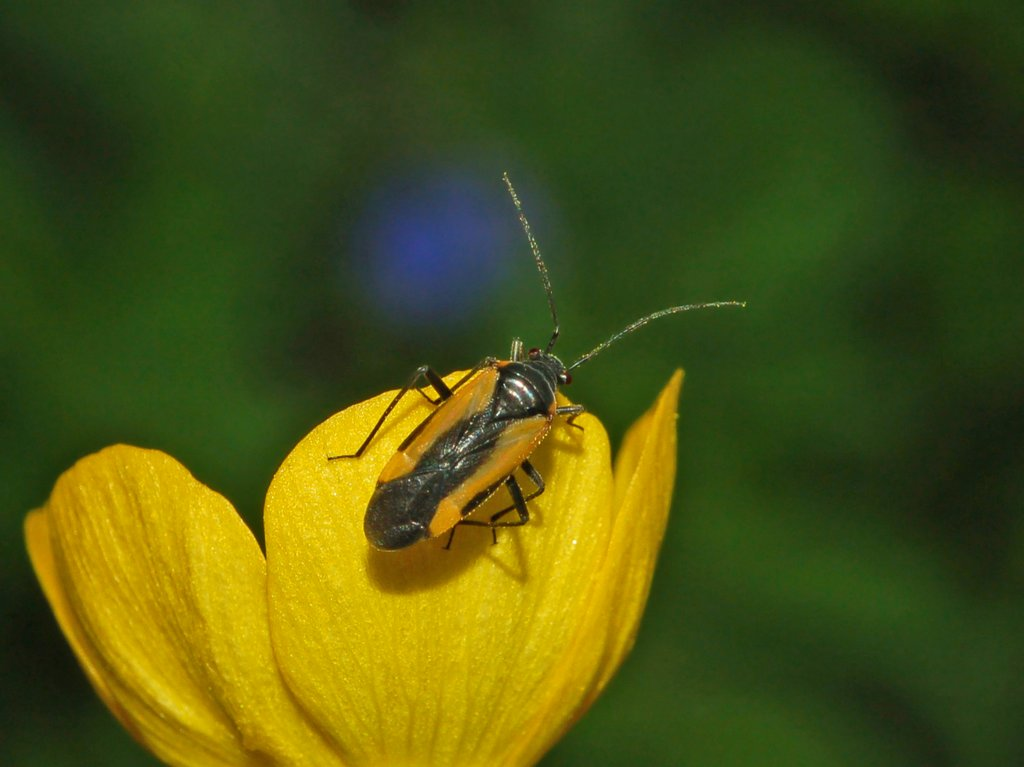
- Dionconotus neglectus var. flavescens

Scientific classification
- Kingdom: Animalia
- Phylum: Arthropoda
- Class: Insecta
- Order: Hemiptera
- Suborder: Heteroptera
- Family: Miridae
- Genus: Dionconotus
- Species: D. neglectus

Binomial name
- Dionconotus neglectus (Fabricius, 1798)

= Dionconotus neglectus =

Species of true bug

Dionconotus neglectus is a plant bug belonging to the family Miridae, subfamily Mirinae. The species was first described by Johan Christian Fabricius in 1798.

== Subspecies ==
- Dionconotus neglectus neglectus (Fabricius, 1798)
- Dionconotus neglectus major Wagner, 1968
- Dionconotus neglectus flavescens Ferrari, 1874
- Dionconotus neglectus sellatus Lindberg, 1930

== Distribution ==
This species can mainly be found in France, Italy, Belgium, Bosnia and Croatia.

== Description ==
Dionconotus neglectus can reach a length of about 7 millimetres (0.28 in). Its body is usually black with red or yellow hemielytra.

== Biology ==
These bugs are polyphagous, They develop on grasses and herbaceous weeds and migrate to orange trees. Adults can be found from mid-March to mid-May.
