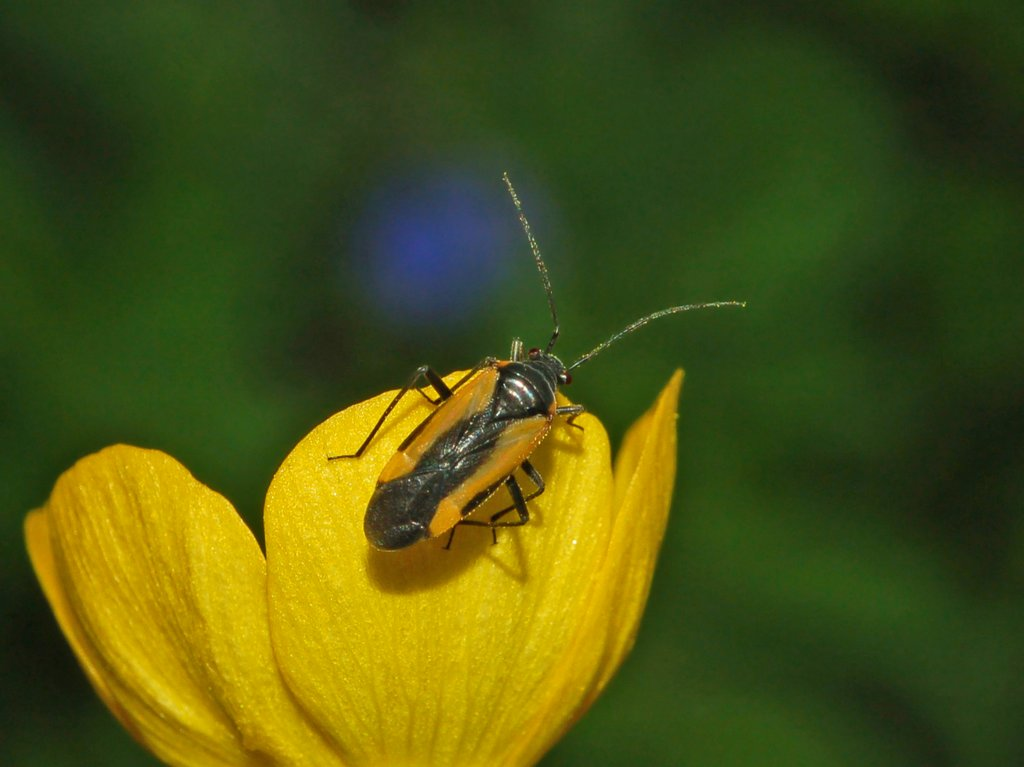
- Dionconotus neglectus var. flavescens

Scientific classification
- Kingdom: Animalia
- Phylum: Arthropoda
- Class: Insecta
- Order: Hemiptera
- Suborder: Heteroptera
- Family: Miridae
- Tribe: Mirini
- Genus: Dionconotus; Reuter, 1894

= Dionconotus =

Genus of true bugs

Dionconotus is a genus of plant bugs belonging to the family Miridae, subfamily Mirinae. Species of this genus are present in Albania, Austria, Bulgaria, Croatia, France, Greece, Hungary, Italy, North Macedonia, Romania, Slovenia and the former Yugoslavia.

== Species ==
- Dionconotus confluens Hoberlandt, 1945
- Dionconotus cruentatus (Brullé, 1832)
- Dionconotus neglectus (Fabricius, 1798)
- Dionconotus parnisanus Hoberlandt, 1945
