= Gracilimiris =

Scientific classification
- Kingdom: Animalia
- Phylum: Arthropoda
- Clade: Pancrustacea
- Class: Insecta
- Order: Hemiptera
- Suborder: Heteroptera
- Family: Miridae
- Subfamily: Mirinae
- Tribe: Mirini
- Genus: Gracilimiris; Stonedahl & Henry, 1991

Genus of true bugs

Gracilimiris is a genus of plant bugs in the family Miridae. There are at least three described species in Gracilimiris.

== Species ==
These three species belong to the genus Gracilimiris:

- Gracilimiris litoralis Stonedahl & Henry, 1991
- Gracilimiris strigosus Stonedahl & Henry, 1991
- Gracilimiris wheeleri Stonedahl & Henry, 1991
