= Ganocapsus =

Scientific classification
- Kingdom: Animalia
- Phylum: Arthropoda
- Clade: Pancrustacea
- Class: Insecta
- Order: Hemiptera
- Suborder: Heteroptera
- Family: Miridae
- Tribe: Mirini
- Genus: Ganocapsus; Van Duzee, 1912
- Species: G. filiformis

Binomial name
- Ganocapsus filiformis Van Duzee, 1912

Genus of true bugs

Ganocapsus is a genus of plant bugs in the family Miridae. There is one described species in Ganocapsus, G. filiformis.
