= Notholopisca =

Scientific classification
- Kingdom: Animalia
- Phylum: Arthropoda
- Clade: Pancrustacea
- Class: Insecta
- Order: Hemiptera
- Suborder: Heteroptera
- Family: Miridae
- Tribe: Mirini
- Genus: Notholopisca; Carvalho, 1975
- Species: N. californica

Binomial name
- Notholopisca californica (Knight, 1933)

Genus of true bugs

Notholopisca is a genus of plant bugs in the family Miridae. There is one described species in Notholopisca, N. californica.
