= Tropidosteptes geminus =

Scientific classification
- Kingdom: Animalia
- Phylum: Arthropoda
- Class: Insecta
- Order: Hemiptera
- Suborder: Heteroptera
- Family: Miridae
- Genus: Tropidosteptes
- Species: T. geminus

Binomial name
- Tropidosteptes geminus (Say, 1832)

Species of true bug

Tropidosteptes geminus is a species of plant bug in the family Miridae. It is found in North America.
