= Zalmunna =

Scientific classification
- Kingdom: Animalia
- Phylum: Arthropoda
- Class: Insecta
- Order: Hemiptera
- Suborder: Heteroptera
- Family: Miridae
- Tribe: Mirini
- Genus: Zalmunna; Distant, 1909

Genus of true bugs

Zalmunna is a genus of plant bugs in the tribe Mirini.
