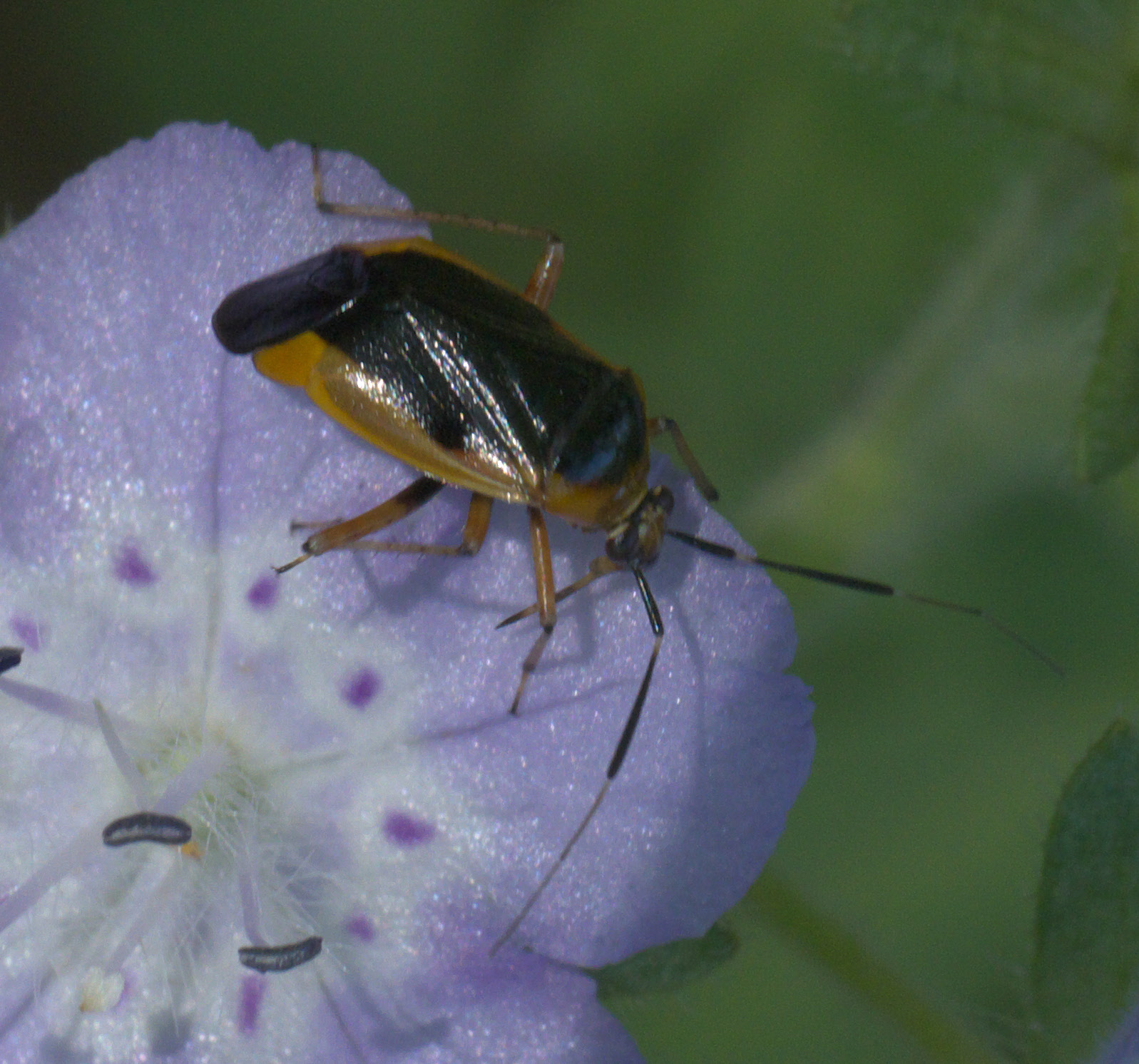

Scientific classification
- Kingdom: Animalia
- Phylum: Arthropoda
- Class: Insecta
- Order: Hemiptera
- Suborder: Heteroptera
- Family: Miridae
- Genus: Metriorrhynchomiris
- Species: M. dislocatus

Binomial name
- Metriorrhynchomiris dislocatus (Say, 1832)

Synonyms
- Metriorrhynchomiris affinis (Reuter, 1876); Poecilocapsus affinis Reuter, 1876

= Metriorrhynchomiris dislocatus =

Species of true bug

Metriorrhynchomiris dislocatus is a species of plant bug in the family Miridae. It is found in North America.

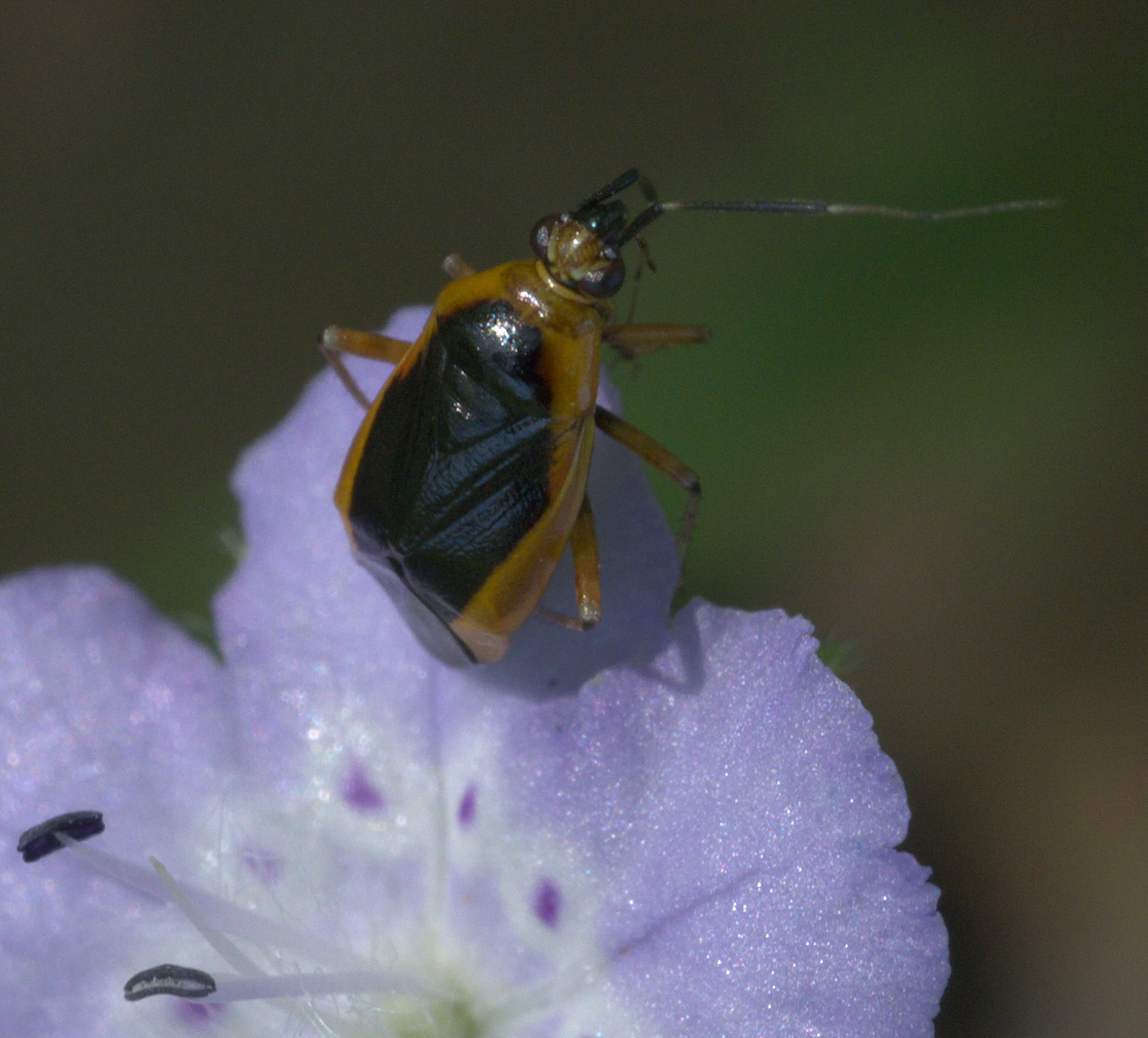
