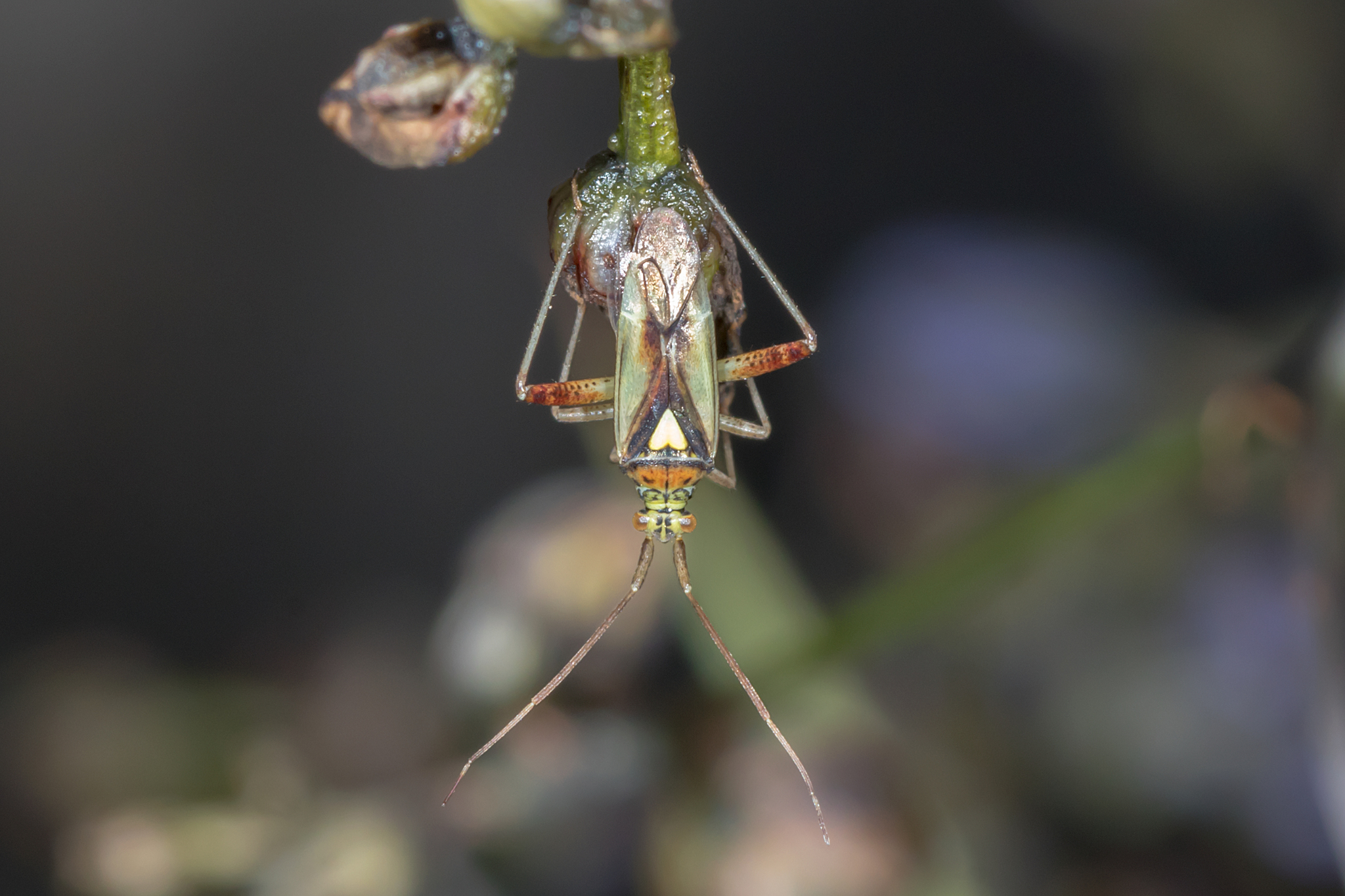

Scientific classification
- Kingdom: Animalia
- Phylum: Arthropoda
- Class: Insecta
- Order: Hemiptera
- Suborder: Heteroptera
- Family: Miridae
- Tribe: Mirini
- Genus: Lincolnia; Eyles & Carvalho, 1988

= Lincolnia =

Genus of true bugs

Lincolnia is a genus of bugs in the tribe Mirini.

== See also ==
- Linconia (US colony in Central America proposed by Abraham Lincoln in 1862)
