= Neoborella =

Scientific classification
- Kingdom: Animalia
- Phylum: Arthropoda
- Clade: Pancrustacea
- Class: Insecta
- Order: Hemiptera
- Suborder: Heteroptera
- Family: Miridae
- Subfamily: Mirinae
- Tribe: Mirini
- Genus: Neoborella; Knight, 1925

Genus of true bugs

Neoborella is a genus of plant bugs in the family Miridae. There are about five described species in Neoborella.

== Species ==
These five species belong to the genus Neoborella:

- Neoborella canadensis Kelton & Herring, 1978
- Neoborella pseudotsugae Kelton & Herring, 1978
- Neoborella simplex (Reuter, 1908)
- Neoborella tumida Knight, 1925
- Neoborella xanthenes Herring, 1972
