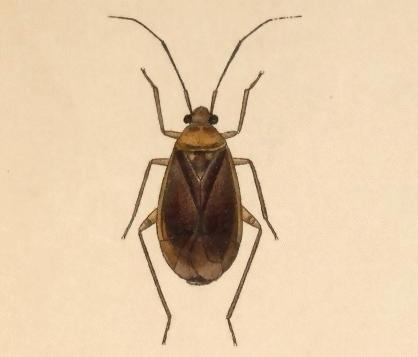
- Rhasis amplificatus

Scientific classification
- Kingdom: Animalia
- Phylum: Arthropoda
- Class: Insecta
- Order: Hemiptera
- Suborder: Heteroptera
- Family: Miridae
- Tribe: Mirini
- Genus: Rhasis; Distant, 1893

= Rhasis =

Genus of true bugs

Rhasis is a genus of true bugs in the tribe Mirini.
