= Thania =

Thania is a feminine given name. Notable people with the name include:

- Thania Paffenholz, Swiss researcher and policy advisor
- Thania Petersen (born 1980), South African visual artist
- Thania St. John, American television producer and writer

== See also ==
- Tania, feminine given name
- Al Thania TV, Syrian television network
