= Eurystylus =

Scientific classification
- Domain: Eukaryota
- Kingdom: Animalia
- Phylum: Arthropoda
- Class: Insecta
- Order: Hemiptera
- Suborder: Heteroptera
- Family: Miridae
- Genus: Eurystylus

Genus of insects

Eurystylus is a genus of true bugs belonging to the family Miridae.

The genus has almost cosmopolitan distribution.

Species:

- Eurystylus alboplagiatus Distant, 1913
- Eurystylus annulipes (Poppius, 1910)
- Eurystylus antennatus Odhiambo, 1958
- Eurystylus apicifer (Walker, 1873)
- Eurystylus austrinus (Kirkaldy, 1908)
- Eurystylus bakeri Poppius, 1915
- Eurystylus bellevoyei (Reuter, 1879)
- Eurystylus brunneus Poppius, 1911
- Eurystylus burmanicus (Distant, 1904)
- Eurystylus capensis (Distant, 1904)
- Eurystylus cardui (Distant, 1913)
- Eurystylus coelestialium (Kirkaldy, 1902)
- Eurystylus costalis Stal, 1871
- Eurystylus erebus (Distant, 1904)
- Eurystylus fuscatus Odhiambo, 1958
- Eurystylus horvathi Poppius, 1911
- Eurystylus jingfui Yasunaga, Nakatani & Chérot, 2017
- Eurystylus latus Poppius, 1915
- Eurystylus lestoni Stonedahl, 1995
- Eurystylus lineaticollis Poppius, 1911
- Eurystylus luteus Hsiao, 1941
- Eurystylus marginatus Odhiambo, 1958
- Eurystylus minutus Poppius, 1911
- Eurystylus montanus Poppius, 1915
- Eurystylus oldi Poppius, 1912
- Eurystylus pallidus Poppius, 1915
- Eurystylus reuteri Poppius, 1911
- Eurystylus rubroscutellatus Odhiambo, 1958
- Eurystylus rufocunealis Poppius, 1911
- Eurystylus ryukyus Yasunaga, Nakatani & Chérot, 2017
- Eurystylus sauteri Poppius, 1915
- Eurystylus schoutedeni (Reuter, 1910)
- Eurystylus scutellaris Poppius, 1915
- Eurystylus varipennis Odhiambo, 1958
