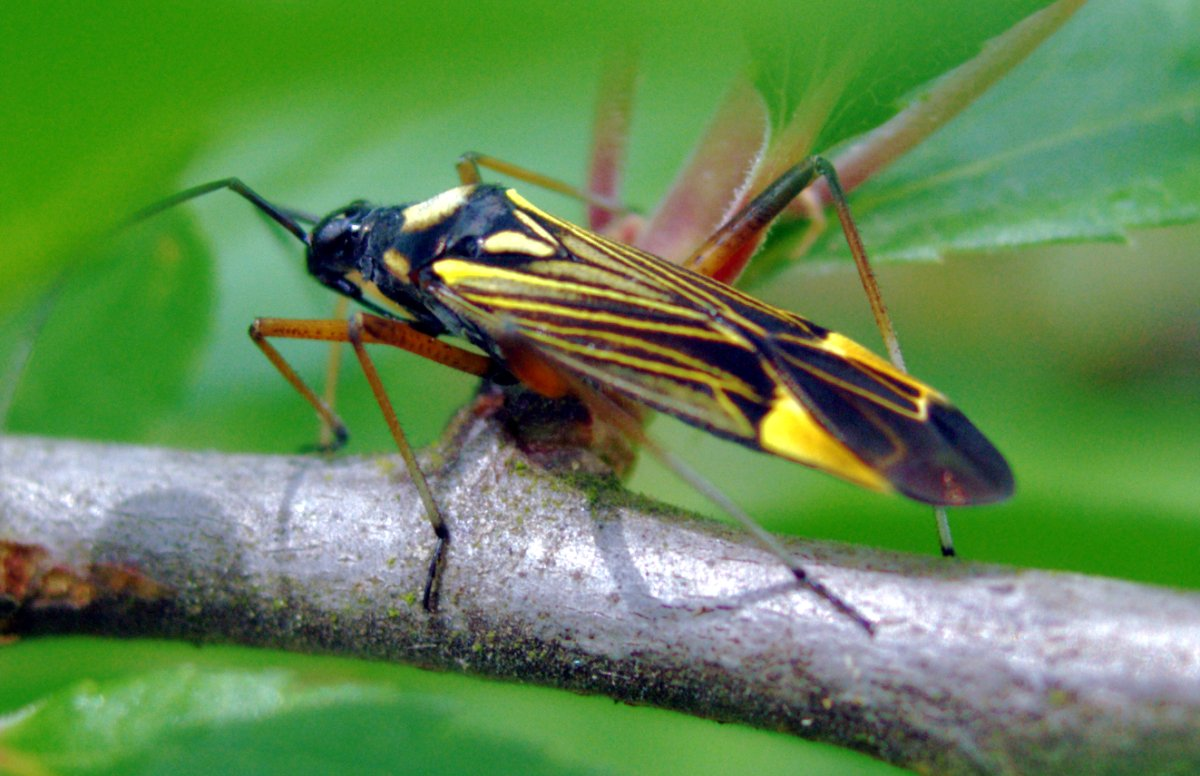
- Miris striatus, Münster, Germany, 2004

Scientific classification
- Kingdom: Animalia
- Phylum: Arthropoda
- Clade: Pancrustacea
- Class: Insecta
- Order: Hemiptera
- Suborder: Heteroptera
- Family: Miridae
- Subfamily: Mirinae
- Tribe: Mirini; Hahn, 1831

Genera
- See text

= Mirini =

Tribe of true bugs

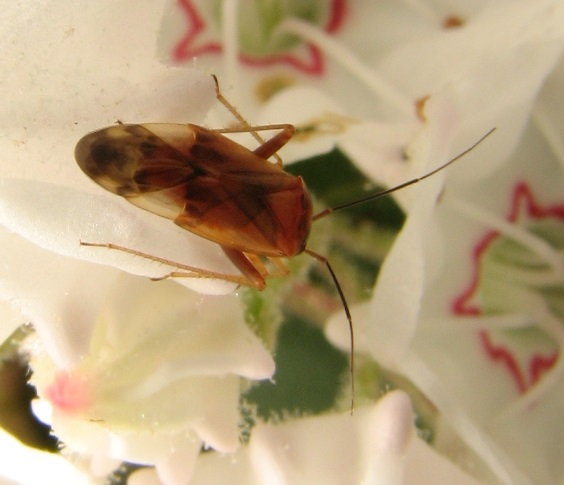
Neolygus laureae on mountain mint

Mirini is a tribe of plant bugs belonging to the subfamily Mirinae.

== Genera ==
Acanthocranella - Acanthopeplus - Actinonotus - Adelphocoridea - Adelphocoris - Adelphocorisella - Adnotholopus - Adphytocoris - Adpiasus - Adtaedia - Agnocoris - Alloeochrus - Alloeonotus - Allorhinocoris - Anexochus - Anosibea - Anthophilolygus - Apantilius - Aphanosoma - Apolygopsis - Apolygus - Araucanomiris - Argenis - Aristopeplus - Atahualpacoris - Austrocapsus - Austropeplus - Azumamiris - Bertsa - Bipuncticoris - Bispinocoris - Bolivarmiris - Boliviocapsus - Boliviocoris - Bolteria - Bowdenella - Brachycoleus - Buettneriella - Calocoris - Calocorisca - Calocoropsis - Calondas - Calyptodera - Camptozygum - Capsodes - Capsus - Carvalhocapsus - Castanopsides - Catarinea - Charagochilus - Cheilocapsidea - Cheilocapsus - Chileaia - Chilocrates - Chimsunchartella - Chinamiris - Chrysodasia - Cixacoris - Closterotomus - Coccobaphes - Corcovadisca - Coyolesia - Creontiades - Cyphodema - Cyphodemidea - Cyphoxacicoris - Dagbertus - Derophthalma - Derophthalmoides - Dichrooscytus - Diognetus - Diomocoris - Dionconotus - Diplotrichiella - Eblis - Ectopiocerus - Eglerocoris - Elektra - Elthemidea - Eocalocoris - Eolygus - Epimecellus - Eremobiellus - Eubatas - Euchilocoris - Euphorbialygus - Euphytocoris - Eurystylomorpha - Eurystylopsis - Eurystylus - Fangumellus - Fortunacoris - Froeschneriella - Galapagomiris - Ganocapsinus - Ganocapsisca - Ganocapsoides - Ganocapsus - Garganisca - Garganus - Gauchocoris - Gianellia - Gigantomiris - Gollneria - Gorna - Gracilimiris - Grypocoris - Guianella - Gutrida - Hadrodemus - Himalisundacoris - Henicocnemis - Henrylygus - Heterolygus - Heteropantilius - Hissaritus - Histriocoridea - Histriocoris - Horcias - Horciasinus - Horciasisca - Horciasoides - Horistus - Horvathiella - Horwathia - Ialibua - Incamiris - Irbisia - Iridopeplus - Ischnoscelicoris - Isoldalinus - Jacchinus - Josifovolygus - Juinia - Kiambura - Kiwimiris - Knightomiris - Koreocoris - Kraussmiris - Lampethusa - Lamprocapsidea - Liistonotus - Lilianocoris - Lincolnia - Linocerocoris - Liocapsidea - Liocapsus - Liocoris - Loristes - Lucitanus - Lygidea - Lygidolon - Lygocorias - Lygocorides - Lygocoris - Lygus - Macednus - Macgregorius - Macrolygus - Macropeplus - Madondo - Mahania - Maxacalinus - Megacoelopsis - Megacoelum - Mermitelocerus - Metasequoiamiris - Metriorrhynchomiris - Micromimetus - Minasmiris - Minytus - Miridius - Miridoides - Miris - Mirivena - Mixocapsus - Miyamotoa - Mollendocoris - Monalocorisca - Monopharsus - Moroca - Morocisca - Mourecoris - Nannomiris - Neoborella - Neoborops - Neocapsus - Neolygopsis - Neolygus - Neomegacoelum - Neopeplus - Neosapinnius - Neostenotus - Nepiolygus - Nesosylphas - Neurocolpus - Niastama - Nonlygus - Notholopisca - Notholopus - Ochtherocapsus - Odontoplatys - Oecophyllodes - Ommatodema - Onderothops - Oreolygus - Orientocapsus - Orientomiris - Orthops - Oxacicoris - Pachylygus - Pachypeltocoris - Pachypterna - Pantilius - Pappus - Paramiridius - Paurolygus - Peltidolygus - Peltidopeplus - Perumiris - Pharyllus - Philostephanus - Phytocoridea - Phytocoris - Phytocorisca - Piasus - Pinalitopsis - Pinalitus - Plesioborops - Plesiocapsus - Plesiolygus - Pleurochilophorus - Poeas - Poecilocapsus - Poecilonotus - Polymerias - Polymerus - Poppiocapsidea - Poppiomegacoelum - Proba - Proboscidocoris - Prolygus - Protaedia - Pseudeurystylus - Pseudolygocoris - Pseudolygus - Pseudomegacoelum - Pseudopantilius - Pycnocoris - Quichuamiris - Quitocoris - Rauniella - Reuterista - Rhabdomiris - Rhabdoscytus - Rhasis - Rondonegeria - Ruspoliella - Ryukulygus - Sabactiopus - Sabactus - Salignus - Sanluizia - Sapinnius - Saundersiella - Schoutedeniella - Sidnia - Sinopecoris - Stenoparedra - Stenopterna - Stenotus - Stittocapsus - Stomatomiris - Taedia - Taurocalocoris - Taylorilygus - Teratocapsus - Thania - Thiomiris - Tinginotopsis - Tinginotum - Tolongia - Tracheluchus - Trichobasis - Trichocapsus - Tropidophorella - Tropidosteptes - Tuicoris - Ulumiris - Urubumiris - Urucuiana - Vairocanamiris - Vissosamiris - Volumnus - Warrisia - Waucoris - Wekamiris - Xavantinisca - Yamatolygus - Yngveella - Zalmunna - Zygimus
