= List of Neolygus species =

This is a list of 114 species in Neolygus, a genus of plant bugs in the family Miridae.

== Neolygus species ==
- Neolygus aceris (Kerzhner, 1988)^{c g}
- Neolygus aesculi Knight, 1953^{c g}
- Neolygus alni (Knight, 1917)^{c g}
- Neolygus angustiverticis Lu and Zheng, 2004^{c g}
- Neolygus atricallus (Kelton, 1971)^{c g}
- Neolygus atrinotatus (Knight, 1917)^{c g}
- Neolygus atritylus (Knight, 1917)^{c g}
- Neolygus belfragii (Reuter, 1876)^{c g}
- Neolygus betulae Knight, 1953^{c g}
- Neolygus bimaculatus (Lu and Zheng, 1996)^{c}
- Neolygus bipuncticollis (Poppius, 1915)^{c}
- Neolygus bui Lu and Zheng, 2004^{c g}
- Neolygus canadensis (Knight, 1917)^{c g}
- Neolygus carpini Knight, 1939^{c g}
- Neolygus carvalhoi Lu and Zheng, 2004^{c g}
- Neolygus caryae (Knight, 1917)^{c g b} (hickory plant bug)
- Neolygus chinensis (Lu and Yasunaga, 1994)^{c g}
- Neolygus clavigenitalis (Knight, 1917)^{c g}
- Neolygus communis (Knight, 1916)^{c g b} (pear plant bug)
- Neolygus contaminatus (Fallén, 1807)^{c g}
- Neolygus coryli (Kulik, 1965)^{c g}
- Neolygus crataegi Henry, 2007^{c g}
- Neolygus disciger (Poppius, 1915)^{c g}
- Neolygus elaegni (Yasunaga, 1999)^{c g}
- Neolygus esakii (Yasunaga, 1991)^{c g}
- Neolygus fagi (Knight, 1917)^{c g}
- Neolygus fanjingensis Zheng, 2004^{c g}
- Neolygus flaviceps (Yasunaga, 1991)^{c g}
- Neolygus flavoviridis (Yasunaga, 1991)^{c g}
- Neolygus fraxini (Kerzhner, 1988)^{c g}
- Neolygus gansuensis (Lu and H. Wang, 1996)^{c g}
- Neolygus geminus Knight, 1941^{c g}
- Neolygus geneseensis (Knight, 1917)^{c g}
- Neolygus hakusanensis (Yasunaga, 1991)^{c g}
- Neolygus hani Lu and Zheng, 2004^{c g}
- Neolygus hebeiensis Lu and Zheng, 2004^{c g}
- Neolygus hirticulus (Van Duzee, 1916)^{c g b}
- Neolygus hoberlandti (Kulik, 1965)^{c g}
- Neolygus honshuensis (Linnavuori, 1961)^{c g}
- Neolygus ichitai (Yasunaga, 1991)^{c g}
- Neolygus inconspicuus (Knight, 1917)^{c g b}
- Neolygus indicus (Poppius, 1914)^{c}
- Neolygus invitus (Say, 1832)^{c g}
- Neolygus johnsoni (Knight, 1917)^{c g}
- Neolygus juglandis (Kerzhner, 1988)^{c g}
- Neolygus kawasawai Yasunaga and Schwartz, 2005^{c g}
- Neolygus keltoni (Lu and Zheng, 1998)^{c g}
- Neolygus knighti (Kelton, 1971)^{c g}
- Neolygus kyushensis (Yasunaga, 1991)^{c g}
- Neolygus lativerticis (Lu and Y. Wang, 1997)^{c g}
- Neolygus laureae (Knight, 1917)^{c g b}
- Neolygus liui Lu and Zheng, 2004^{c g}
- Neolygus lobatus (Linnavuori, 1963)^{c g}
- Neolygus longiusculus (Kulik, 1965)^{c g}
- Neolygus machanensis Yasunaga, Duwal, and Schwartz, 2012^{c g}
- Neolygus majusculus (Yasunaga, 1999)^{c g}
- Neolygus makiharai (Yasunaga, 1992)^{c g}
- Neolygus matsumurae (Poppius, 1915)^{c g}
- Neolygus meridionalis Lu and Zheng, 2004^{c g}
- Neolygus miyamotoi (Yasunaga, 1991)^{c g}
- Neolygus mjohjangsanicus (Josifov, 1992)^{c g}
- Neolygus monticola Lu and Zheng, 2004^{c g}
- Neolygus nakatanii (Yasunaga, 1999)^{c g}
- Neolygus neglectus (Knight, 1917)^{c g}
- Neolygus nemoralis (Kulik, 1965)^{c g}
- Neolygus nigriscutellaris Lu & Zheng, 2004^{g}
- Neolygus nigroscutellaris Lu and Zheng, 2004^{c g}
- Neolygus nipponicus (Yasunaga, 1991)^{c g}
- Neolygus nyssae (Knight, 1918)^{c g}
- Neolygus obesus (Yasunaga, 1991)^{c g}
- Neolygus omnivagus (Knight, 1917)^{c g}
- Neolygus ostryae (Knight, 1917)^{c g}
- Neolygus parrotti (Knight, 1919)^{c g}
- Neolygus parshleyi (Knight, 1917)^{c g}
- Neolygus partitus (Walker, 1873)^{c g}
- Neolygus philyrinus (Kerzhner, 1988)^{c g}
- Neolygus piceicola (Kelton, 1971)^{c g}
- Neolygus pictus Lu and Zheng, 2004^{c g}
- Neolygus populi (Leston, 1957)^{c g}
- Neolygus pteleinus (Kerzhner, 1977)^{c g}
- Neolygus quercalbae (Knight, 1917)^{c g}
- Neolygus renae Lu and Zheng, 2004^{c g}
- Neolygus roseus (Yasunaga, 1991)^{c g}
- Neolygus rufilorum (Lu and Zheng, 1998)^{c g}
- Neolygus rufostriatus Lu and Zheng, 2004^{c g}
- Neolygus ryoma Yasunaga and Schwartz, 2005^{c g}
- Neolygus salicicola (Lu and Zheng, 1998)^{c g}
- Neolygus semivittatus (Knight, 1917)^{c g}
- Neolygus shennongensis Lu and Zheng, 2004^{c g}
- Neolygus similis (Yasunaga, 1992)^{c g}
- Neolygus simillimus (Lu and Zheng, 1998)^{c g}
- Neolygus sondaicus (Poppius, 1914)^{c g}
- Neolygus subrufilori Lu and Zheng, 2004^{c g}
- Neolygus sylvaticus (Josifov, 1992)^{c g}
- Neolygus tiliae (Knight, 1917)^{c g b}
- Neolygus tilianus (Lu and Zheng, 1996)^{c g}
- Neolygus tiliicola (Kulik, 1965)^{c g}
- Neolygus tinctus Knight, 1941^{c g b}
- Neolygus tokaraensis (Yasunaga, 1991)^{c g}
- Neolygus tomokunii (Yasunaga, 1991)^{c g}
- Neolygus tsugaruensis (Yasunaga, 1992)^{c g}
- Neolygus univittatus (Knight, 1917)^{c g}
- Neolygus viburni (Knight, 1917)^{c g}
- Neolygus viridis (Fallén, 1807)^{c g}
- Neolygus vitticollis (Reuter, 1876)^{c g b}
- Neolygus vityazi (Kerzhner, 1988)^{c g}
- Neolygus walleyi (Kelton, 1971)^{c g}
- Neolygus wuyiensis (Lu and Zheng, 1998)^{c g}
- Neolygus xizangensis (Lu and Zheng, 1998)^{c g}
- Neolygus yamatoensis (Yasunaga, 1999)^{c g}
- Neolygus yulongensis (Lu and Zheng, 1998)^{c g}
- Neolygus zebei Gunther, 1997^{g}
- Neolygus zhengi (Lu and Yasunaga, 1994)^{c g}
- Neolygus zhugei (Yasunaga, 1991)^{c g}

Data sources: i = ITIS, c = Catalogue of Life, g = GBIF, b = Bugguide.net
