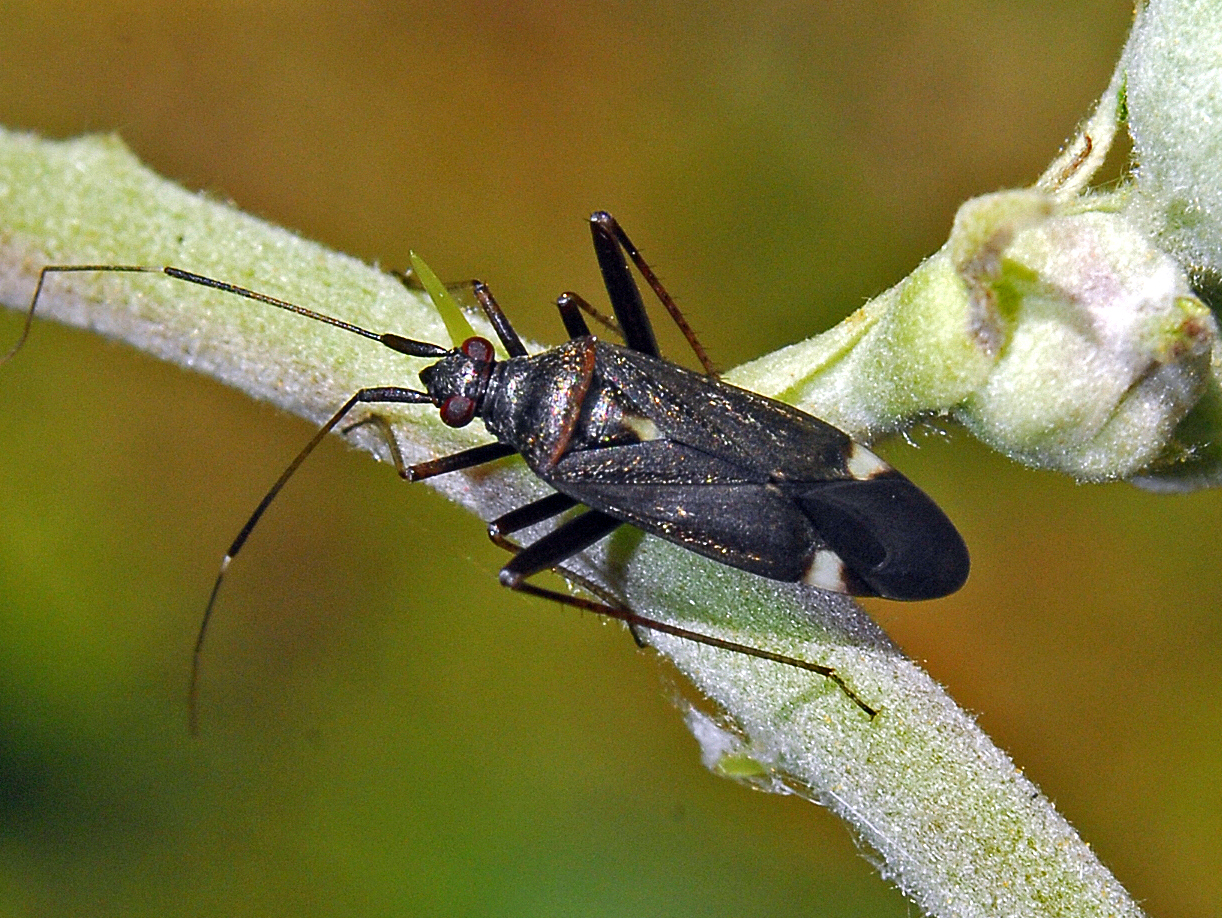
- Closterotomus ventralis

Scientific classification
- Kingdom: Animalia
- Phylum: Arthropoda
- Class: Insecta
- Order: Hemiptera
- Suborder: Heteroptera
- Family: Miridae
- Subfamily: Mirinae
- Tribe: Mirini
- Genus: Closterotomus
- Species: C. ventralis

Binomial name
- Closterotomus ventralis (Reuter, 1879)

Synonyms
- Calocoris ventralis Reuter, 1879; Phytocoris ventralis Reuter, 1879

= Closterotomus ventralis =

Species of true bug

Closterotomus ventralis is a species of plant bugs belonging to the family Miridae, subfamily Mirinae.

== Distribution ==
This species can be found in the southern Europe (Bulgaria, France, Greece, Italy, North Macedonia, Romania, Slovenia and Spain).

== Description ==
Closterotomus ventralis can reach a length of 6–7 millimetres (0.24–0.28 in). The body is mainly black, as are the head and the antennae. The second antennal segment is larger in the distal part. The legs are reddish or brown-red.

== Biology ==
These bugs feed on Rubus species.
