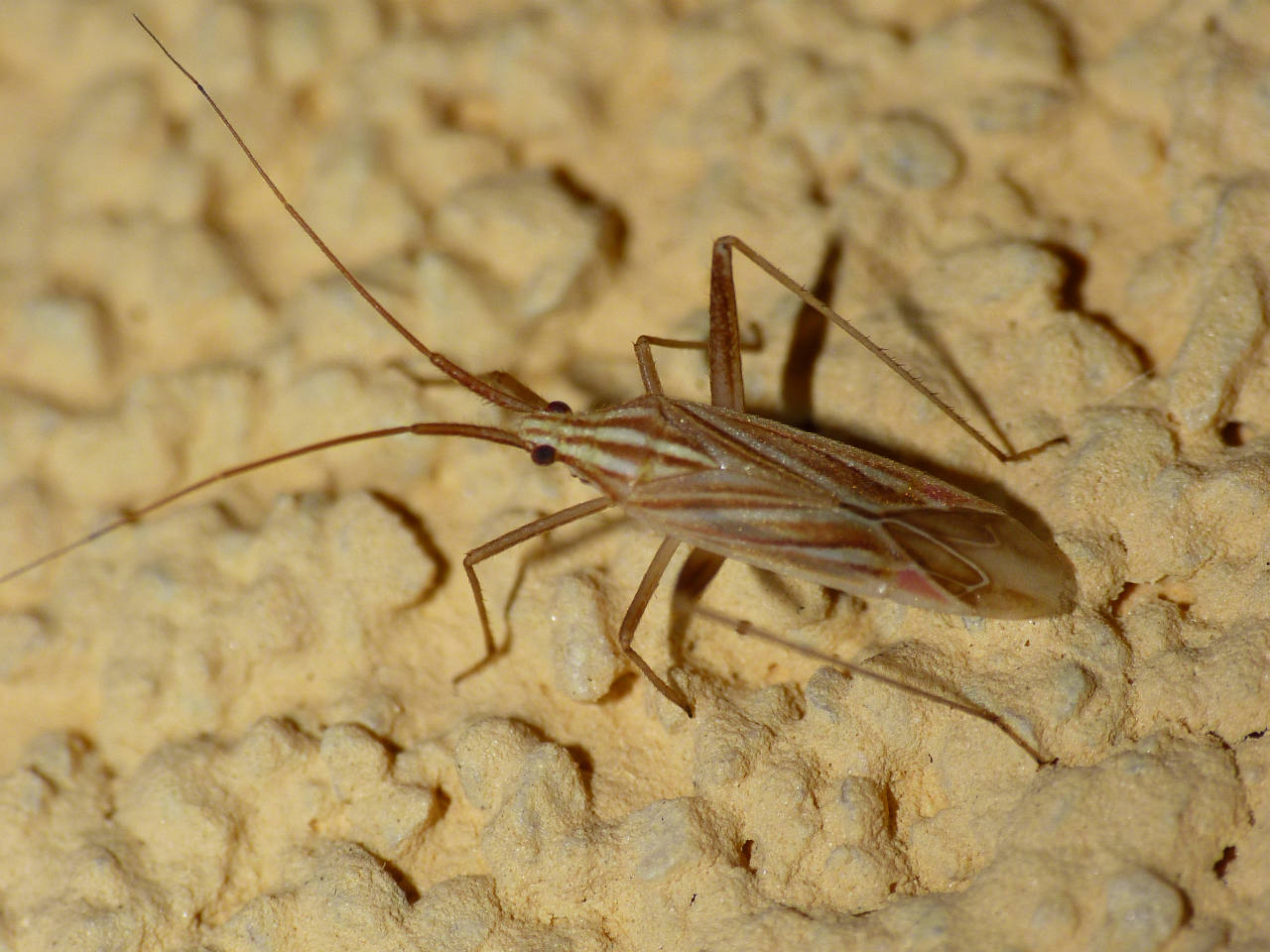

Scientific classification
- Kingdom: Animalia
- Phylum: Arthropoda
- Class: Insecta
- Order: Hemiptera
- Suborder: Heteroptera
- Family: Miridae
- Subfamily: Mirinae
- Tribe: Mirini
- Genus: Miridius
- Species: M. quadrivirgatus

Binomial name
- Miridius quadrivirgatus (A. Costa, 1853)

Synonyms
- Miris quadrivirgatus A. Costa 1853

= Miridius quadrivirgatus =

Species of true bug

Miridius quadrivirgatus, is a species of European bugs in the tribe Mirini. They can be found much of the western European mainland, Corsica, the Azores, southern England and Pembrokeshire.

== Description ==
The species is 9–11 millimetres (0.35–0.43 in) long and have creamy-red coloured stripes which go along its head, prothorax and scutellum.

== Distribution ==
It is mainly found in Austria, Belgium, Bulgaria, the Canary Islands, Croatia, France, Germany, Greece, Italy, Portugal, Spain, Switzerland, the Netherlands, Ukraine and Britain I. In Britain, it is found between Suffolk and Pembrokeshire.
