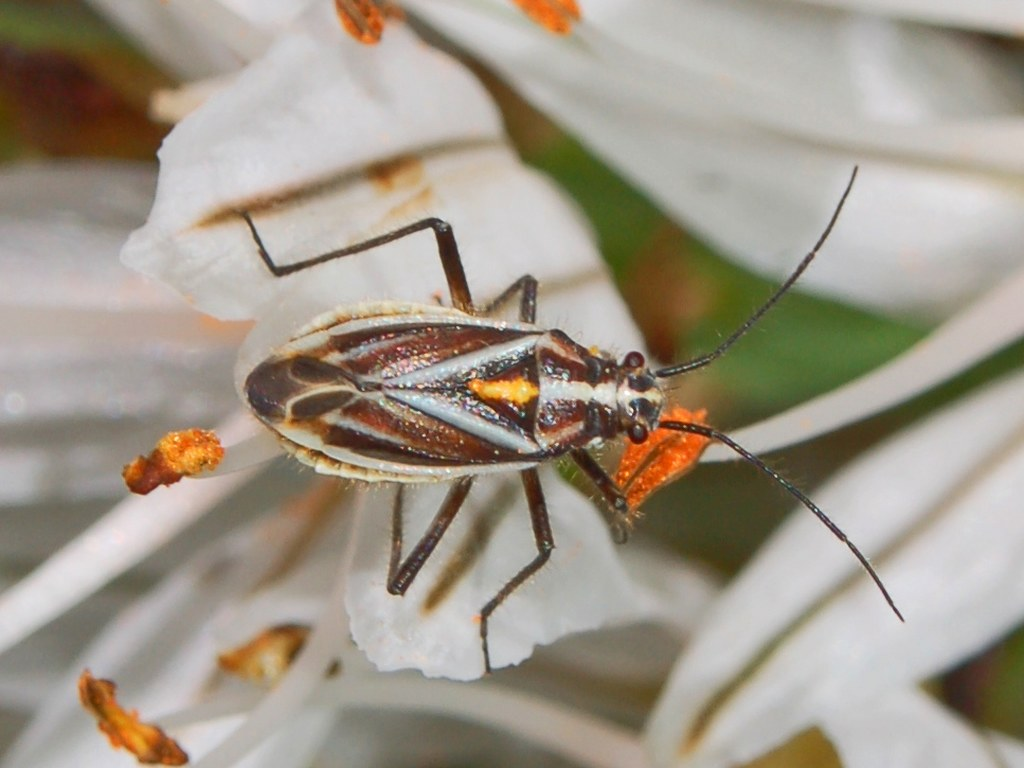

Scientific classification
- Kingdom: Animalia
- Phylum: Arthropoda
- Class: Insecta
- Order: Hemiptera
- Suborder: Heteroptera
- Family: Miridae
- Genus: Horistus
- Species: H. orientalis

Binomial name
- Horistus orientalis (Gmelin, 1790)

Synonyms
- Capsides cingulatus (Fabricius, 1787); Capsides lineolatus (Brullé, 1832)

= Horistus orientalis =

Species of true bug

Horistus orientalis is a species of plant bugs, part of the suborder Heteroptera (also called "true bugs"), which belongs to the family Miridae, subfamily Mirinae.

== Distribution ==
This species can be found in most of continental Europe. These bugs primarily inhabit wet meadows and meadows.

== Description ==
Horistus orientalis can reach a length of 5.3–6.7 millimetres (0.21–0.26 in).

== Biology ==
Adults can be seen from May to August. These polyphagous bugs mainly feed on nectar and juices of Glechoma hederacea, Achillea millefolium, Angelica sylvestris, Galium, Senecio and Bromus species. It is also often found on Asphodelus.
