= Miridius longiceps =

Scientific classification
- Kingdom: Animalia
- Phylum: Arthropoda
- Class: Insecta
- Order: Hemiptera
- Suborder: Heteroptera
- Family: Miridae
- Subfamily: Mirinae
- Tribe: Mirini
- Genus: Miridius
- Species: M. longiceps

Binomial name
- Miridius longiceps Wagner, 1955

Species of true bug

Miridius longiceps is a species of bug from the Miridae family endemic to France, Portugal and Spain.
