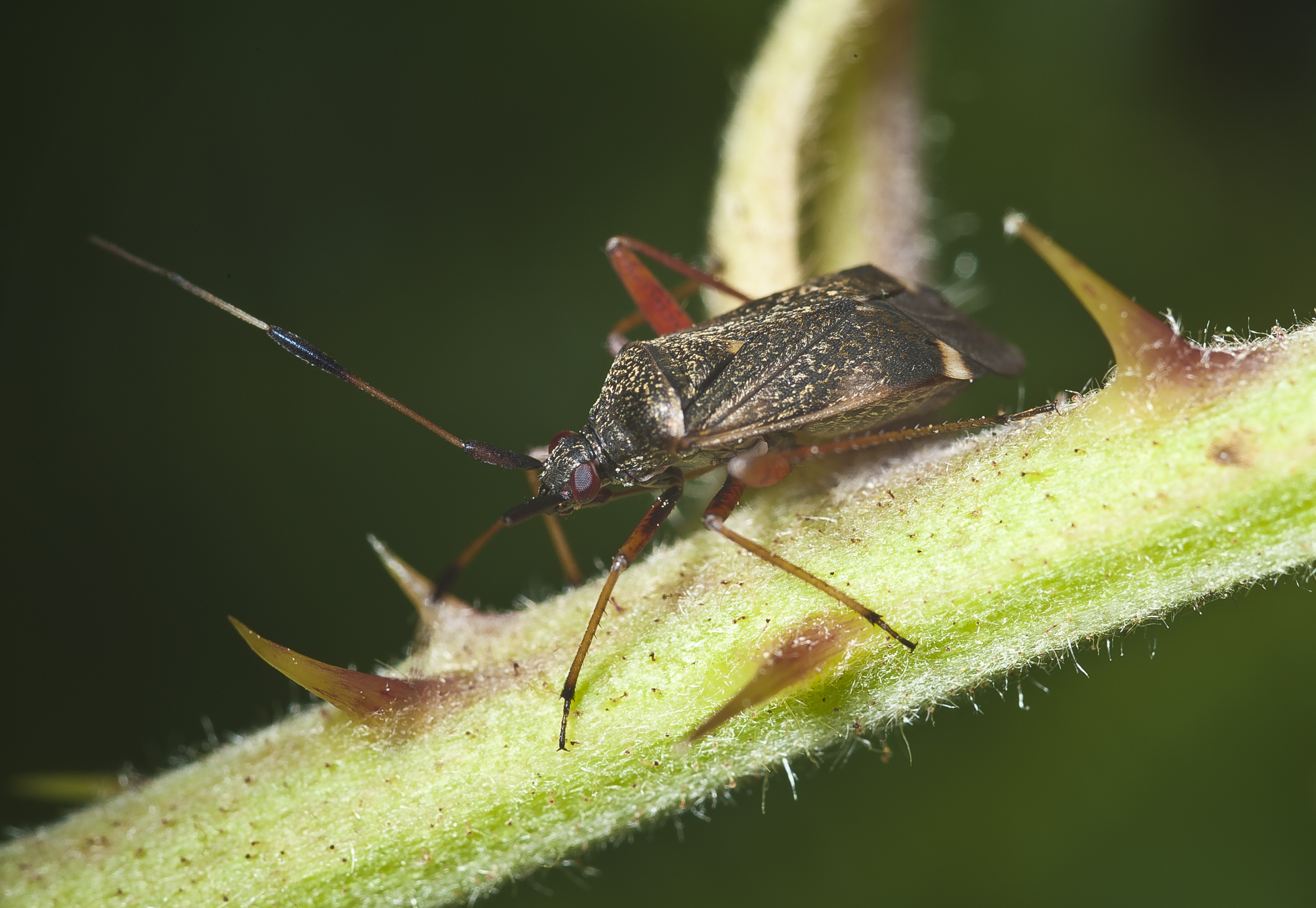

Scientific classification
- Kingdom: Animalia
- Phylum: Arthropoda
- Class: Insecta
- Order: Hemiptera
- Suborder: Heteroptera
- Family: Miridae
- Subfamily: Mirinae
- Tribe: Mirini
- Genus: Closterotomus
- Species: C. biclavatus

Binomial name
- Closterotomus biclavatus (Herrich-Schäffer, 1835)

Synonyms
- Calocoris biclavatus (Herrich-Schäffer, 1835); Calocoris biclavatus biclavatus (Herrich-Schäffer, 1835)

= Closterotomus biclavatus =

Species of true bug

Closterotomus biclavatus is a plant bug belonging to the family Miridae, subfamily Mirinae. The species was first described by Gottlieb August Wilhelm Herrich-Schäffer in 1835.

== Subspecies ==
- Closterotomus biclavatus biclavatus (Herrich-Schäffer, 1835)
- Closterotomus biclavatus dalmatinus (Wagner, 1957)

== Distribution and habitat ==
This species is present in most of Europe. The preferred habitats are trees and bushes, wet forests, the edge rows, and spruce forest edge.

== Description ==
Closterotomus biclavatus can reach a length of 5.5–7 millimetres (0.22–0.28 in) in males, of 6.5–7.6 millimetres (0.26–0.30 in) in females. The color of the body is quite variable, usually black or dark brown, the legs are brown or dark brown. The species can be recognized (even in young specimens) for the enlarged apex of second antennal segment which is blackened.

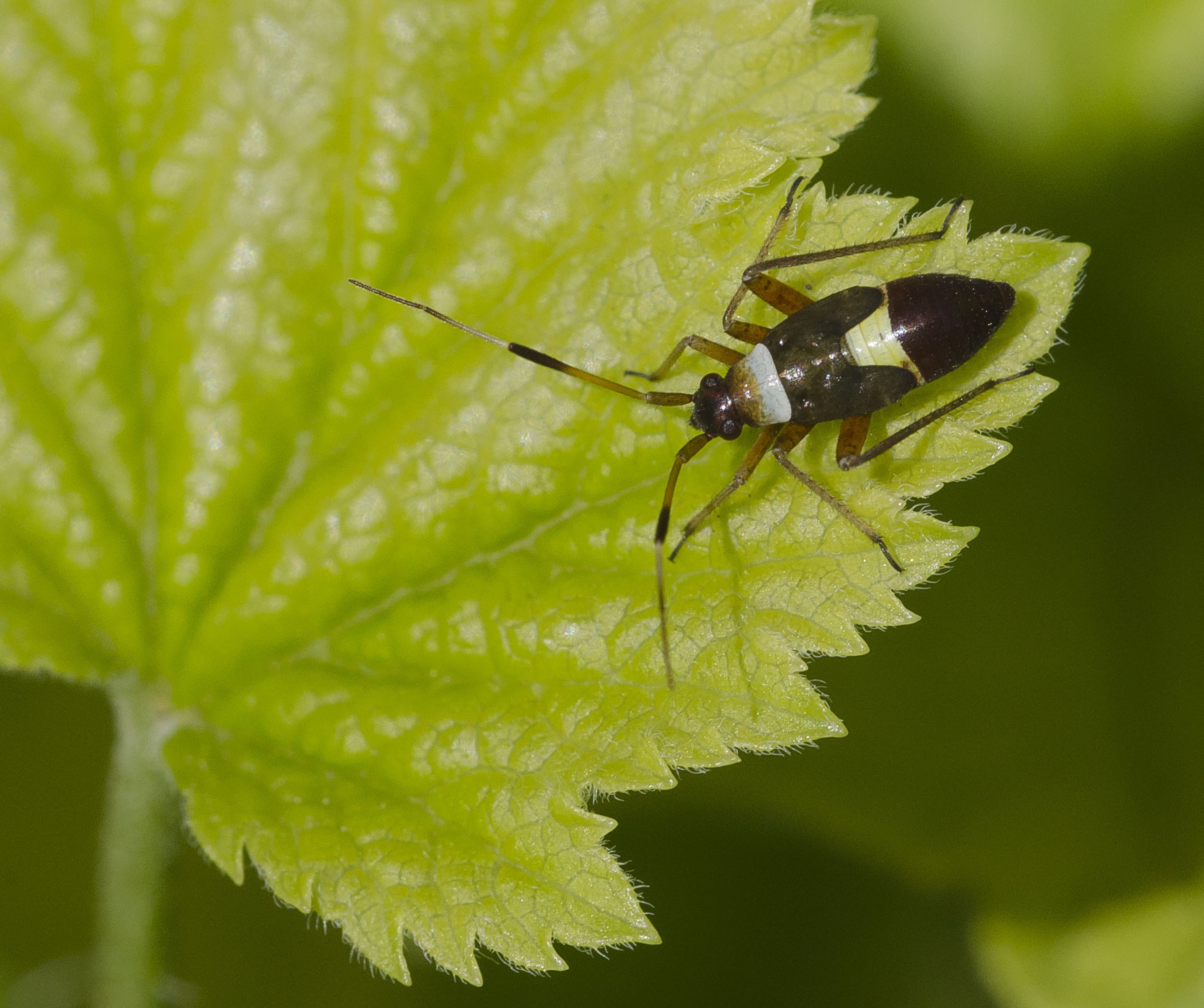
Closterotomus biclavatus, nymph

== Biology ==
Nymphs can be found in June, while adults are present from late June up to September. These plant bugs are polyphagous, feeding on several species of trees and shrubs. They mainly feed on blackberries (Rubus sp.), birch (Betula sp.), hazelnut (Corylus avellana), common honeysuckle (Lonicera periclymenum), blueberry (Vaccinium myrtillus), common ash (Fraxinus excelsior) and also on small insects. They overwinter as eggs, with just one generation per year.
