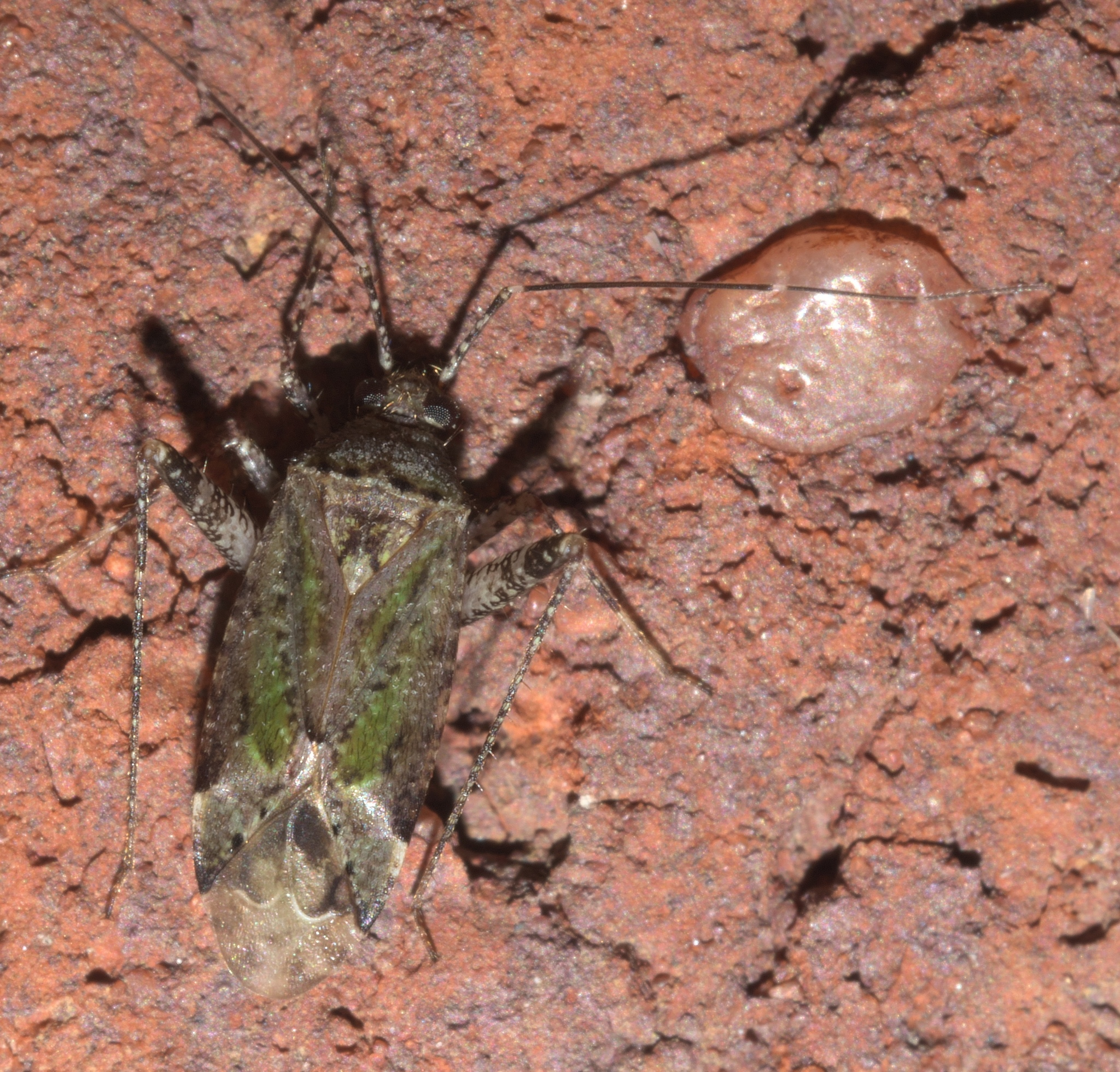
- Phytocoris eximius, Oklahoma

Scientific classification
- Kingdom: Animalia
- Phylum: Arthropoda
- Class: Insecta
- Order: Hemiptera
- Suborder: Heteroptera
- Family: Miridae
- Subfamily: Mirinae
- Tribe: Mirini
- Genus: Phytocoris
- Species: P. eximius

Binomial name
- Phytocoris eximius Reuter, 1876

Synonyms
- Phytocoris eximius Henry & Smith, 1979; Phytocoris exinus Snodgrass, Henry & Scott, 1984; Phytocoris penipecten Knight, 1920

= Phytocoris eximius =

Species of true bugs

Phytocoris eximius is a species of plant bug in the family Miridae. It is found in the United States.
