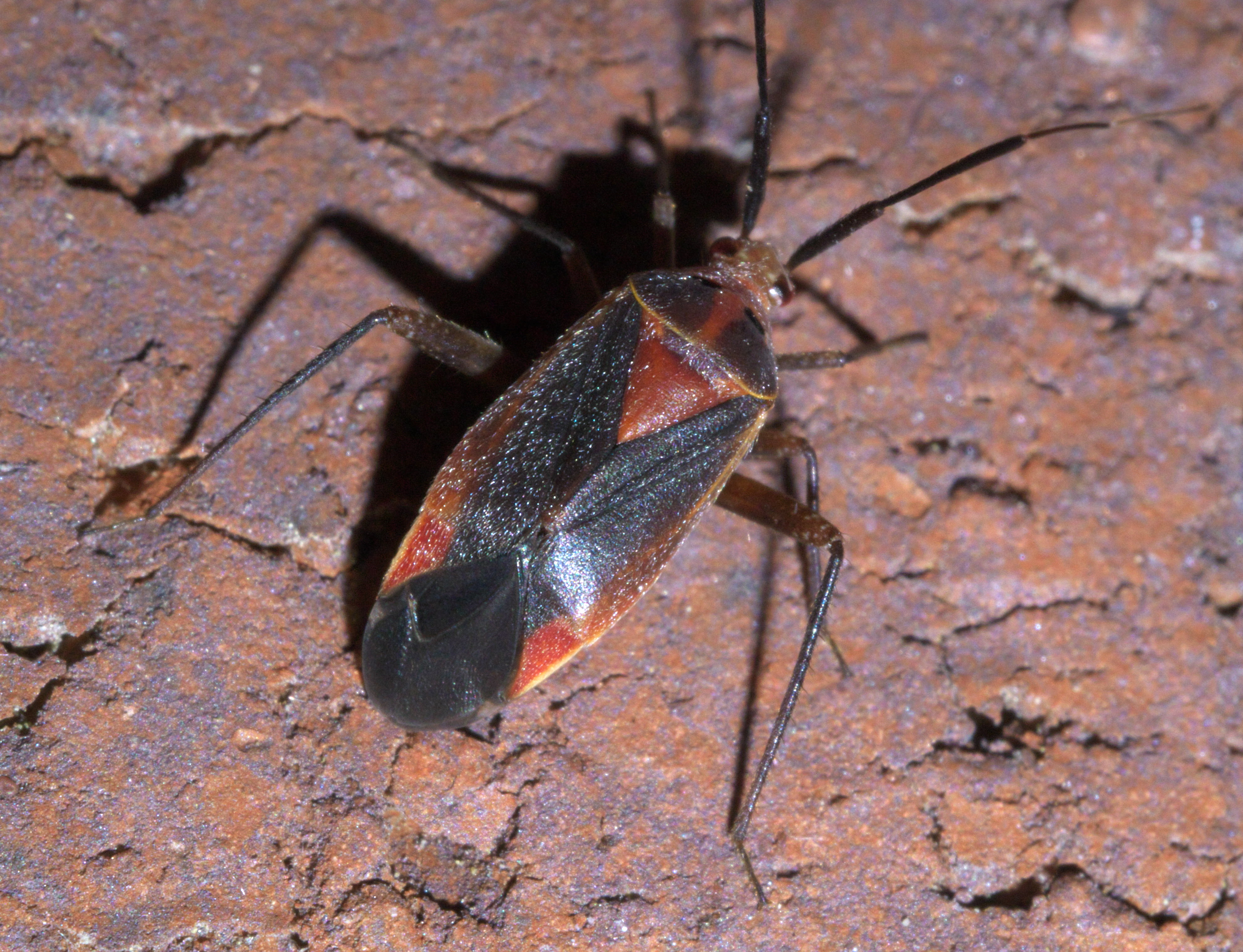

Scientific classification
- Kingdom: Animalia
- Phylum: Arthropoda
- Clade: Pancrustacea
- Class: Insecta
- Order: Hemiptera
- Suborder: Heteroptera
- Family: Miridae
- Subfamily: Mirinae
- Tribe: Mirini
- Genus: Taedia; Distant, 1883

Synonyms
- Paracalocoris Distant, 1883

= Taedia =

Genus of true bugs

Taedia is a genus of plant bugs in the family Miridae. There are more than 80 described species in Taedia.

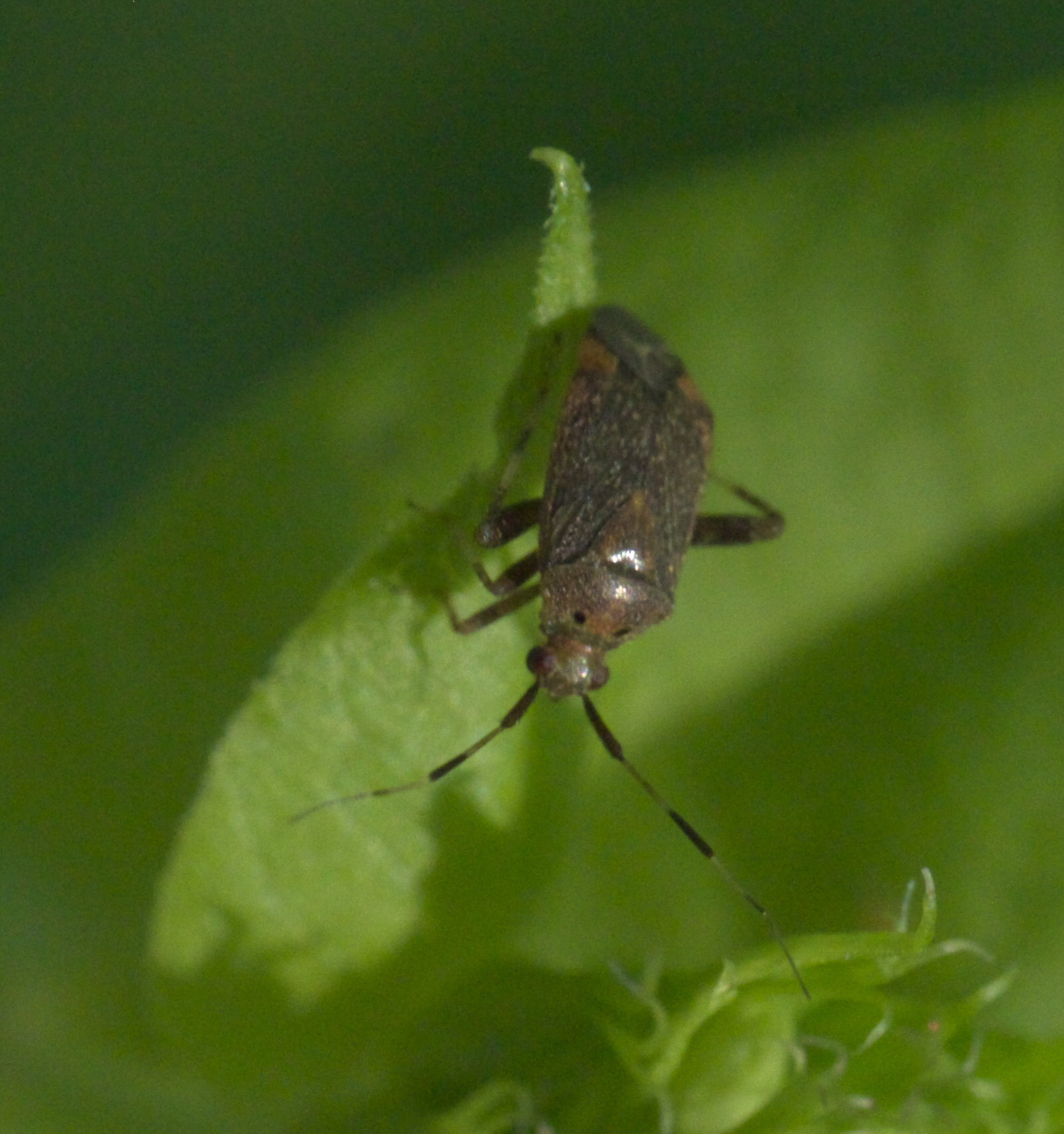

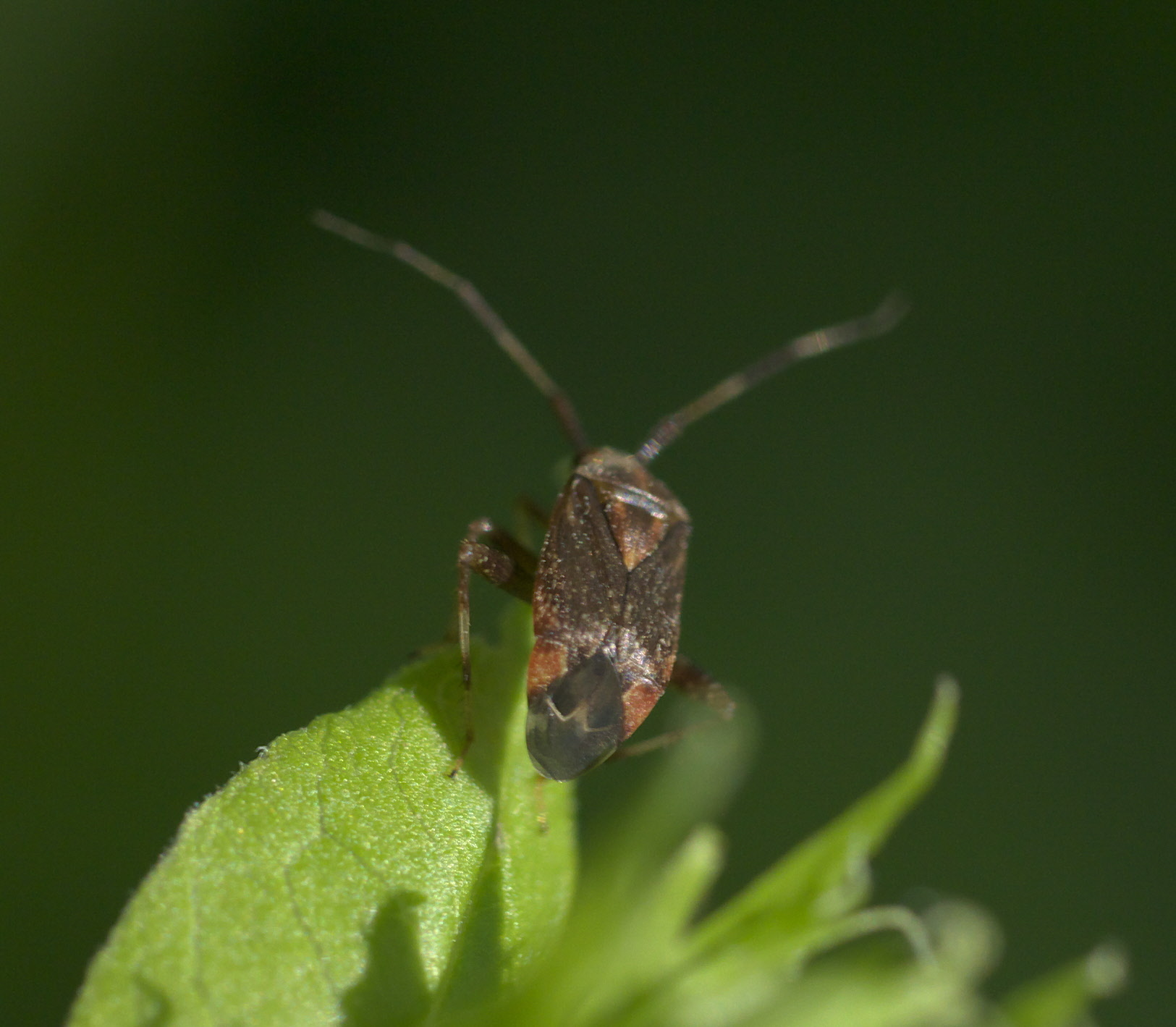

== Species ==
These 87 species belong to the genus Taedia:

- Taedia adusta (McAtee, 1917)
- Taedia albicans Reuter, 1907
- Taedia albifacies (Knight, 1930)
- Taedia angrensis Carvalho, 1975
- Taedia bahiana Carvalho, 1975
- Taedia bananalensis Carvalho & Costa, 1993
- Taedia batesi Carvalho, 1980
- Taedia benfica Carvalho & Costa, 1993
- Taedia bilutea Carvalho, Costa & Cherot, 2000
- Taedia breviata (Knight, 1926)
- Taedia cajabiana Carvalho, 1976
- Taedia casta (McAtee, 1917)
- Taedia celtidis (Knight, 1930)
- Taedia chapadensis Carvalho & Costa, 1993
- Taedia clarensis Carvalho & Costa, 1993
- Taedia coimbrai Carvalho, 1975
- Taedia colon (Say, 1832)
- Taedia compacta Carvalho & Gomes, 1971
- Taedia compactina Carvalho, 1975
- Taedia compactoides Carvalho, 1975
- Taedia cylapoides Carvalho & Gomes, 1971
- Taedia deletica (Reuter, 1909)
- Taedia diamantina Carvalho, 1984
- Taedia dispersa Carvalho & Costa, 1993
- Taedia distantina Carvalho, 1954
- Taedia elongata Carvalho & Gomes, 1971
- Taedia evonymi (Knight, 1930)
- Taedia externa (Herrich-schaeffer, 1845)
- Taedia fasciola (Knight, 1930)
- Taedia fernandopolina Carvalho & Costa, 1993
- Taedia fistulosus (Distant, 1883)
- Taedia floridana (Knight, 1926)
- Taedia gleditsiae (Knight, 1926)
- Taedia goiana Carvalho & Costa, 1992
- Taedia guimarana Carvalho & Costa, 1993
- Taedia guttulosa (Reuter, 1907)
- Taedia hawleyi (Knight, 1917) (hop plant bug)
- Taedia heidemanni (Reuter, 1909)
- Taedia incaica Carvalho & Gomes, 1971
- Taedia johnstoni (Knight, 1930)
- Taedia juina Carvalho & Costa, 1993
- Taedia jurgiosa (Stål, 1862)
- Taedia koluenia Carvalho & Costa, 1993
- Taedia lenticulosa (Stål, 1860)
- Taedia leprosa (Walker, 1873)
- Taedia limba (McAtee, 1917)
- Taedia maculosa (Knight, 1930)
- Taedia manauara Carvalho, 1983
- Taedia maraba Carvalho & Costa, 1993
- Taedia marmorata (Uhler, 1894)
- Taedia mexicana Carvalho, 1975
- Taedia missionera Carvalho, 1975
- Taedia mollicula (Distant, 1884)
- Taedia multicolor Carvalho, 1975
- Taedia multisignata (Reuter, 1909)
- Taedia nicholi (Knight, 1926)
- Taedia nobilitata (Stål, 1860)
- Taedia pacifica Carvalho & Gomes, 1971
- Taedia pallidula (McAtee, 1917)
- Taedia paraguaiana Carvalho & Costa, 1991
- Taedia parenthesis (Knight, 1930)
- Taedia pauwelsi Carvalho, Costa & Cherot, 2000
- Taedia pernobilis (Reuter, 1907)
- Taedia pirapora Carvalho & Costa, 1993
- Taedia rondonia Carvalho, 1983
- Taedia salicis (Knight, 1926)
- Taedia schaffneri Carvalho, 1975
- Taedia scrupea (Say, 1832)
- Taedia scutellata Carvalho & Wallerstein, 1978
- Taedia semilota (Stål, 1860)
- Taedia severini (Knight, 1926)
- Taedia signata Carvalho & Gomes, 1971
- Taedia similaris Carvalho & Gomes, 1971
- Taedia sinopea Carvalho & Costa, 1993
- Taedia stigmosa (Berg, 1878)
- Taedia striolata (Bergroth, 1898)
- Taedia sulina Carvalho, 1954
- Taedia tehuacana Carvalho, 1975
- Taedia teutoniana Carvalho & Costa, 1993
- Taedia tibiannulata Carvalho, 1975
- Taedia tijucana Carvalho & Costa, 1993
- Taedia trivitta (Knight, 1930)
- Taedia trivittatus (Reuter, 1913)
- Taedia tucuruiensis Carvalho, 1981
- Taedia vilhena Carvalho & Costa, 1993
- Taedia virgulata (Knight, 1930)
- Taedia xinguana Carvalho, 1975
