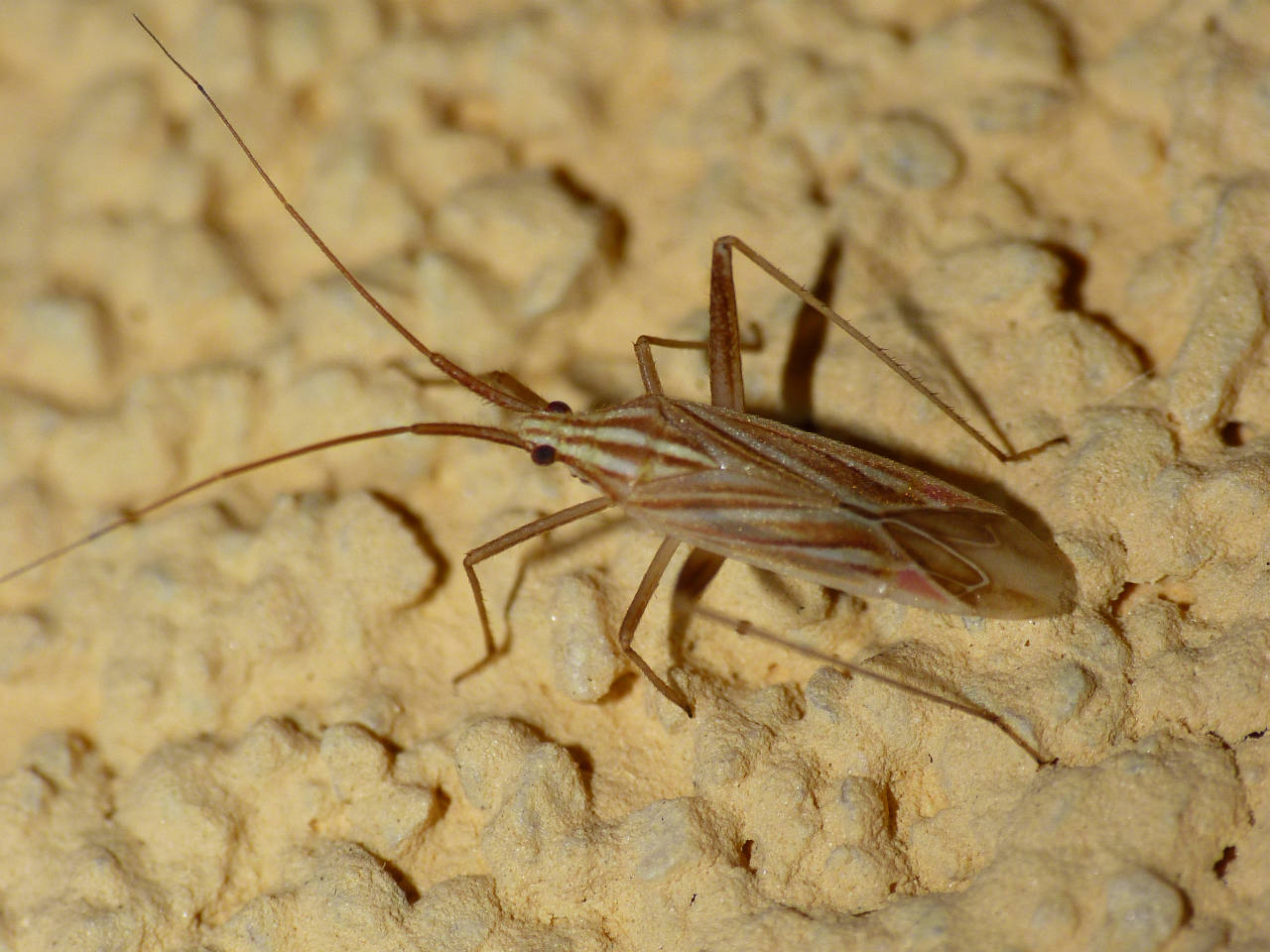
- Miridius quadrivirgatus

Scientific classification
- Domain: Eukaryota
- Kingdom: Animalia
- Phylum: Arthropoda
- Class: Insecta
- Order: Hemiptera
- Suborder: Heteroptera
- Family: Miridae
- Subfamily: Mirinae
- Tribe: Mirini
- Genus: Miridius; Fieber, 1858

= Miridius =

Genus of true bugs

Miridius is a genus of mostly European bugs in the family Miridae and tribe Mirini, erected by Franz Xaver Fieber in 1858.

== Species ==
The following are included:

1. Miridius longiceps Wagner, 1955
2. Miridius multidentatus Carapezza, 1997
3. Miridius pallidus Horvath, 1887
4. Miridius quadrivirgatus (A. Costa, 1853)
5. Miridius rubrolineatus (Poppius, 1912) (synonym M. loriae Poppius, 1914)
