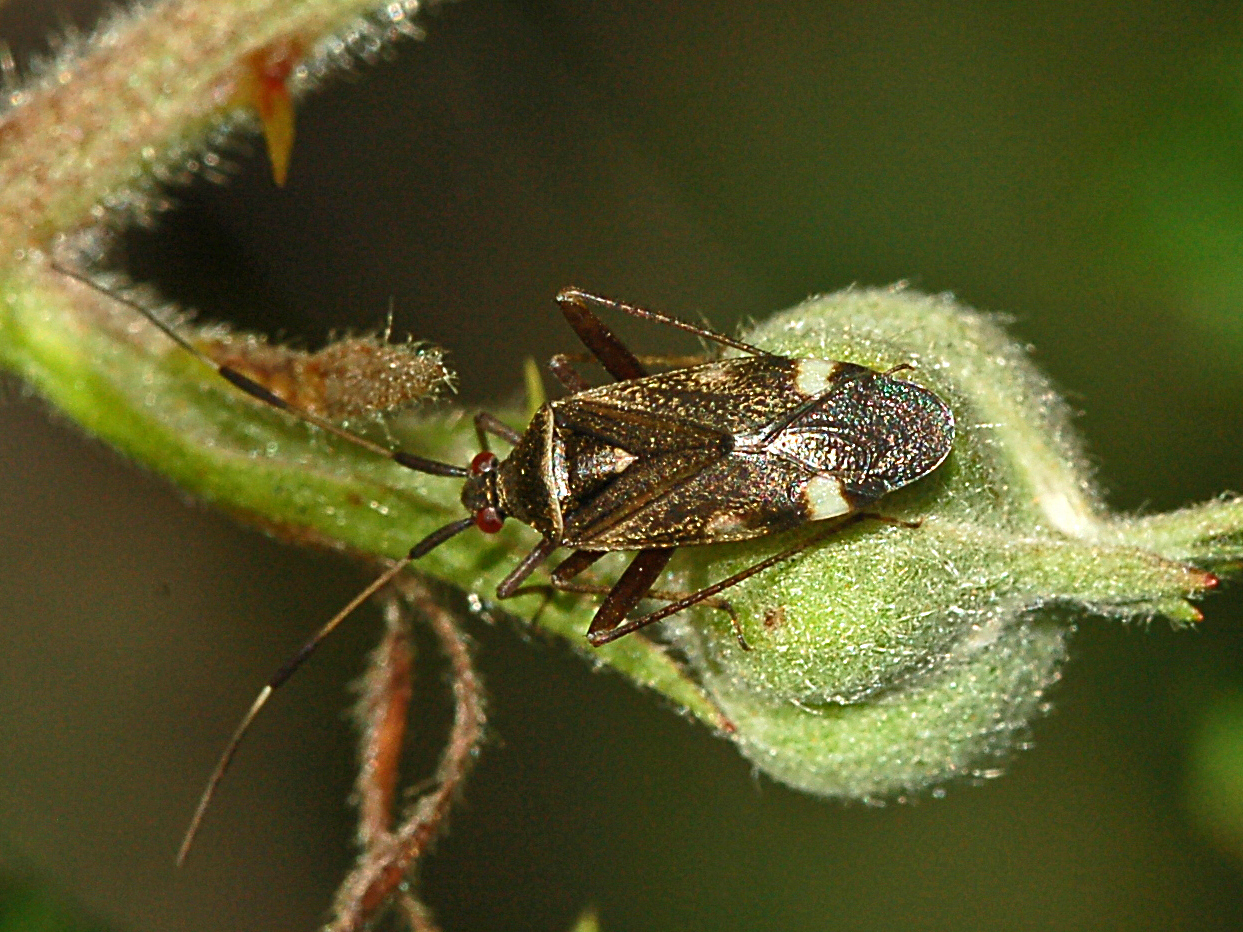
- Closterotomus biclavatus

Scientific classification
- Kingdom: Animalia
- Phylum: Arthropoda
- Class: Insecta
- Order: Hemiptera
- Suborder: Heteroptera
- Family: Miridae
- Subfamily: Mirinae
- Tribe: Mirini
- Genus: Closterotomus; Fieber, 1858

= Closterotomus =

Genus of true bugs

Closterotomus is a genus of plant bugs belonging to the family Miridae, subfamily Mirinae. They are found in the Palearctic and North America.

== Species ==
These 34 species belong to the genus Closterotomus:

- Closterotomus annulus (Brulle, 1832)
- Closterotomus aqranus (Linnavuori, 1984)
- Closterotomus biclavatus (Herrich-Schaeffer, 1835)
- Closterotomus cinctipes (A.Costa, 1853)
- Closterotomus costae (Reuter, 1888)
- Closterotomus fulvomaculatus (De Geer, 1773)
- Closterotomus hedenborgi (Fieber, 1870)
- Closterotomus histrio (Reuter, 1877)
- Closterotomus izyai Matocq & Pluot-Sigwalt, 2006
- Closterotomus kroesus (Seidenstucker, 1977)
- Closterotomus krueperi (Reuter, 1880)
- Closterotomus longitarsis (Reuter, 1896)
- Closterotomus marmoratus (Lindberg, 1934)
- Closterotomus migrans (Lindberg, 1948)
- Closterotomus nigronasutus (Reuter, 1901)
- Closterotomus nigrostriatus (Carapezza, 1997)
- Closterotomus norvegicus (Gmelin, 1790)
- Closterotomus orientalis Carapezza, 2002
- Closterotomus picturatus (Reuter, 1896)
- Closterotomus princeps (Reuter, 1880)
- Closterotomus putoni (Horvath, 1888)
- Closterotomus reuteri (Horvath, 1882)
- Closterotomus rosenzweigi Linnavuori, 2006
- Closterotomus samojedorum (J. Sahlberg, 1878)
- Closterotomus scorzonerae Rosenzweig, 1997
- Closterotomus sedilloti (Puton, 1886)
- Closterotomus spec (Gmelin, 1790)
- Closterotomus trivialis (A.Costa, 1853)
- Closterotomus tunetanus (Wagner, 1942)
- Closterotomus ussuriensis (Kerzhner, 1988)
- Closterotomus valcarceli Ribes & Ribes, 2003
- Closterotomus ventralis (Reuter, 1879)
- Closterotomus venustus (Fieber, 1861)
- Closterotomus vicinus (Horvath, 1876)

== Gallery ==
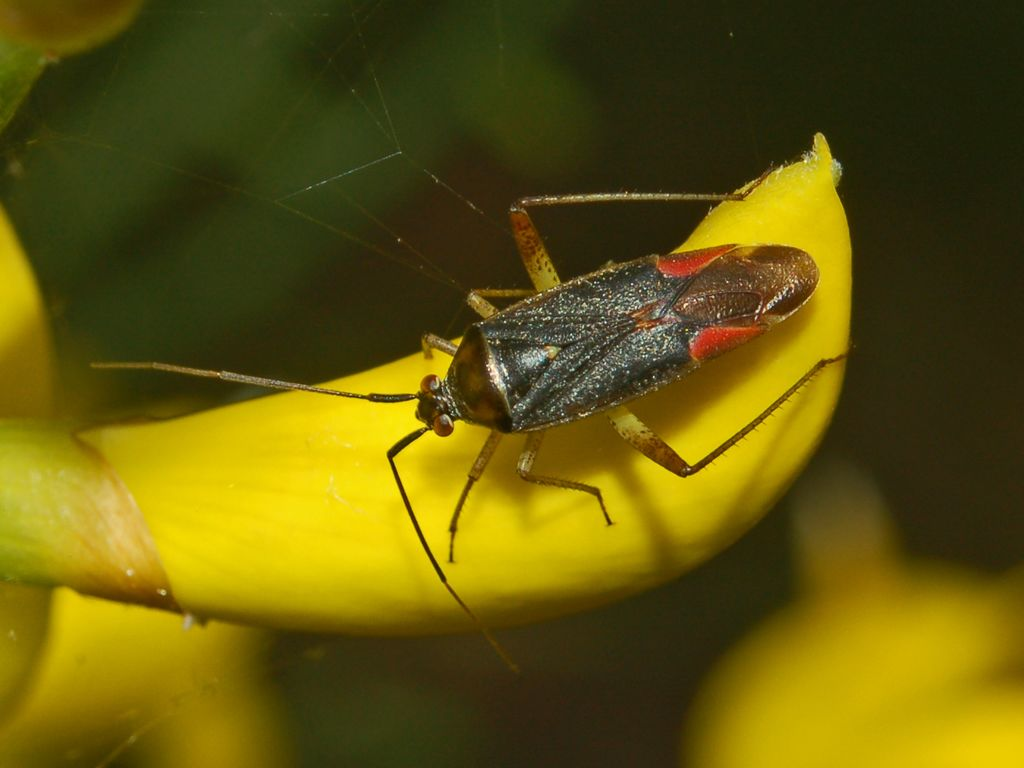
Closterotomus trivialis, male

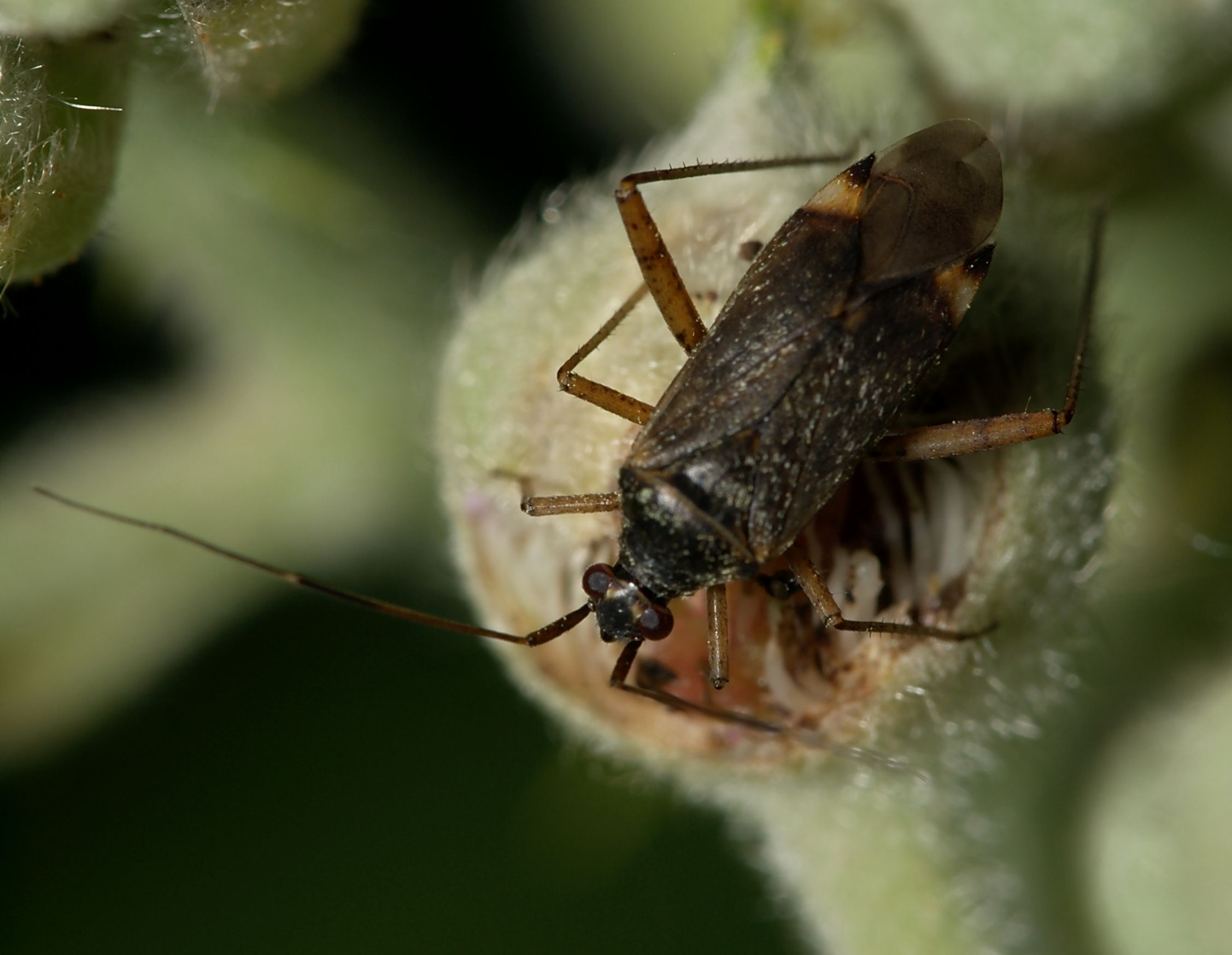
Closterotomus fulvomaculatus

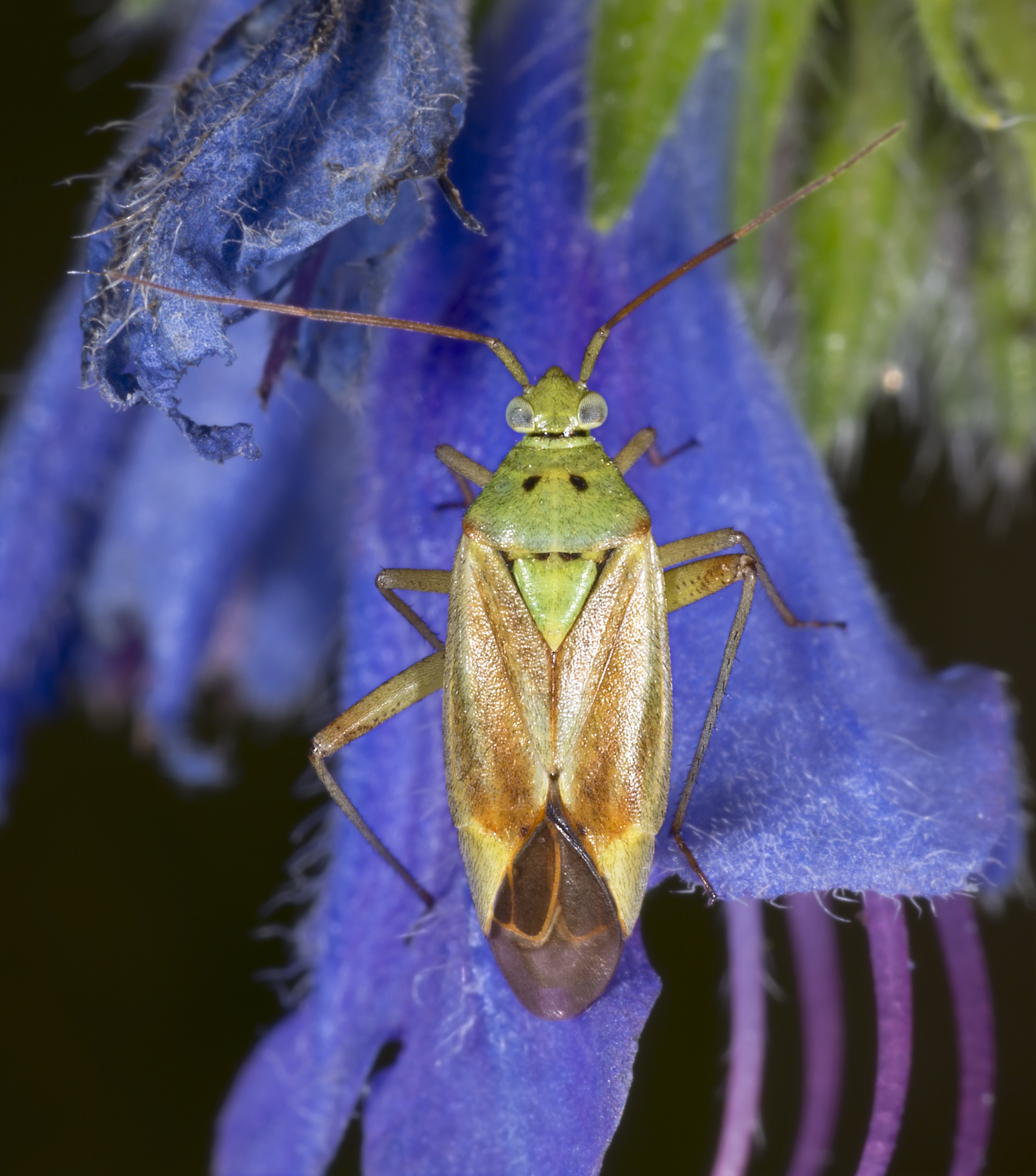
Closterotomus norwegicus

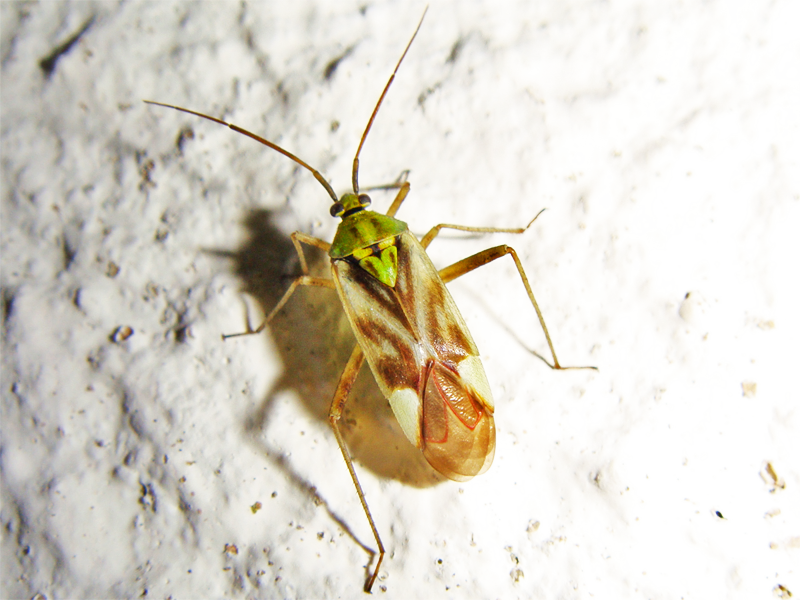
Closterotomus venustus

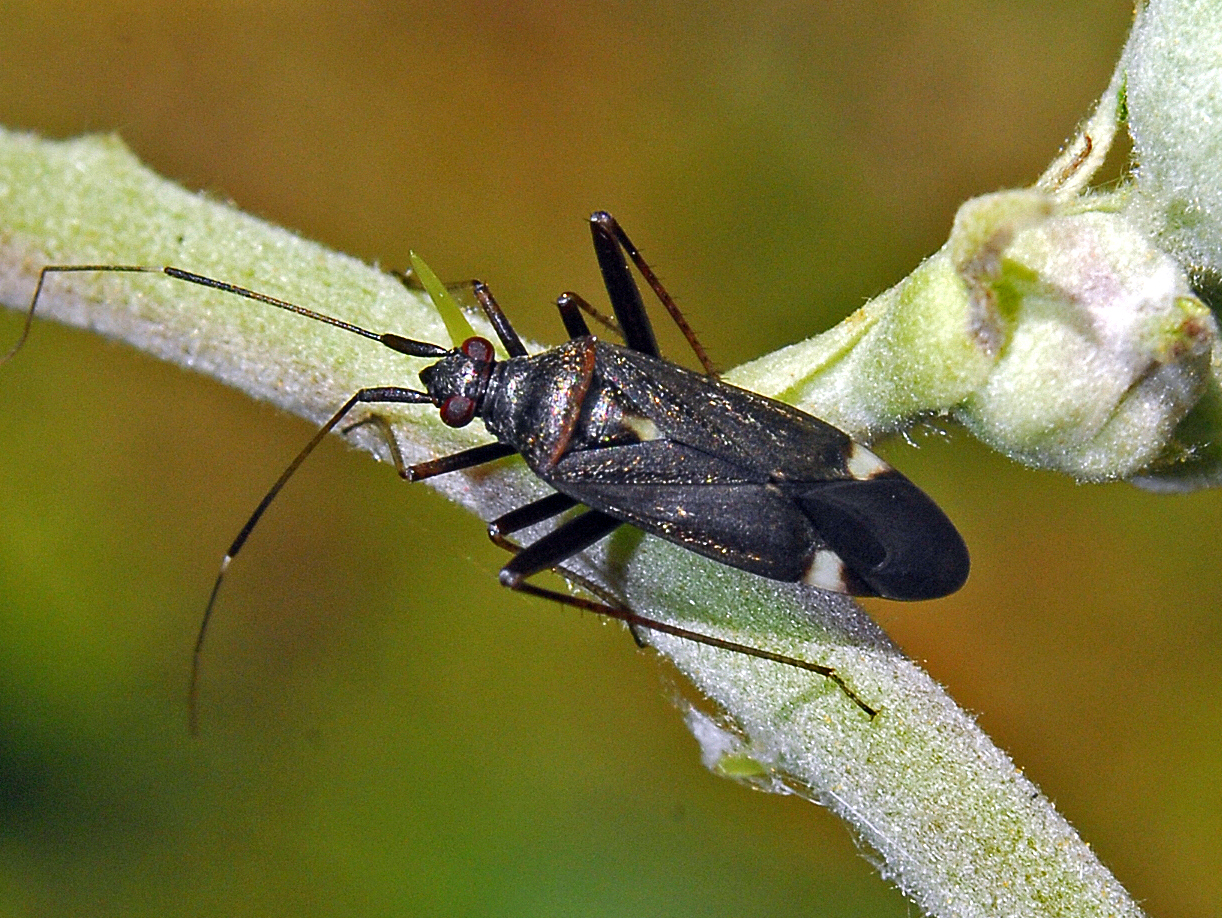
Closterotomus ventralis
