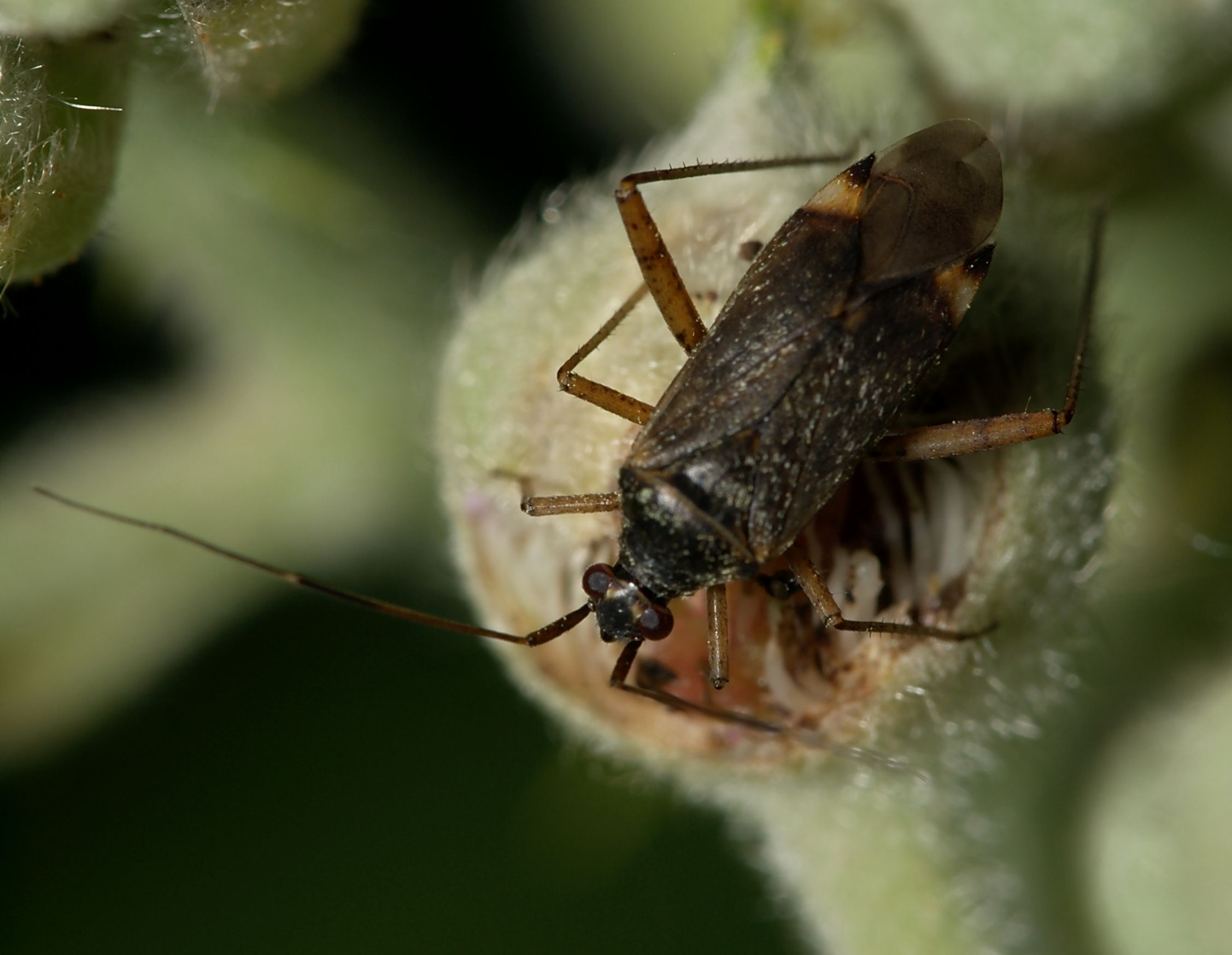
- Closterotomus fulvomaculatus

Scientific classification
- Kingdom: Animalia
- Phylum: Arthropoda
- Clade: Pancrustacea
- Class: Insecta
- Order: Hemiptera
- Suborder: Heteroptera
- Family: Miridae
- Subfamily: Mirinae
- Tribe: Mirini
- Genus: Closterotomus
- Species: C. fulvomaculatus

Binomial name
- Closterotomus fulvomaculatus (De Geer, 1773)

Synonyms
- Cimex fulvomaculatus (De Geer, 1773)

= Closterotomus fulvomaculatus =

Species of true bug

Closterotomus fulvomaculatus is a species of plant bugs of the family Miridae, subfamily Mirinae.

== Description ==
The species is brownish coloured and is 6–7 millimetres (0.24–0.28 in) long while its nymph is either green or yellowish-green in colour. By July, it becomes an adult.

== Distribution ==
It is mainly absent from Andorra, Azores, Canary Islands, Cyprus, Faroe Islands, Iceland, Ireland, Madeira, Malta and northwestern part of Russia.

== Ecology ==
Closterotomus fulvomaculatus lay eggs in the cracks of wooden stems in late July and August. They feed on various fruit crops including Trifolium, Urtica and various plants from family Asteraceae which includes Anthemis, Carduus, Cirsium and Matricaria species.
