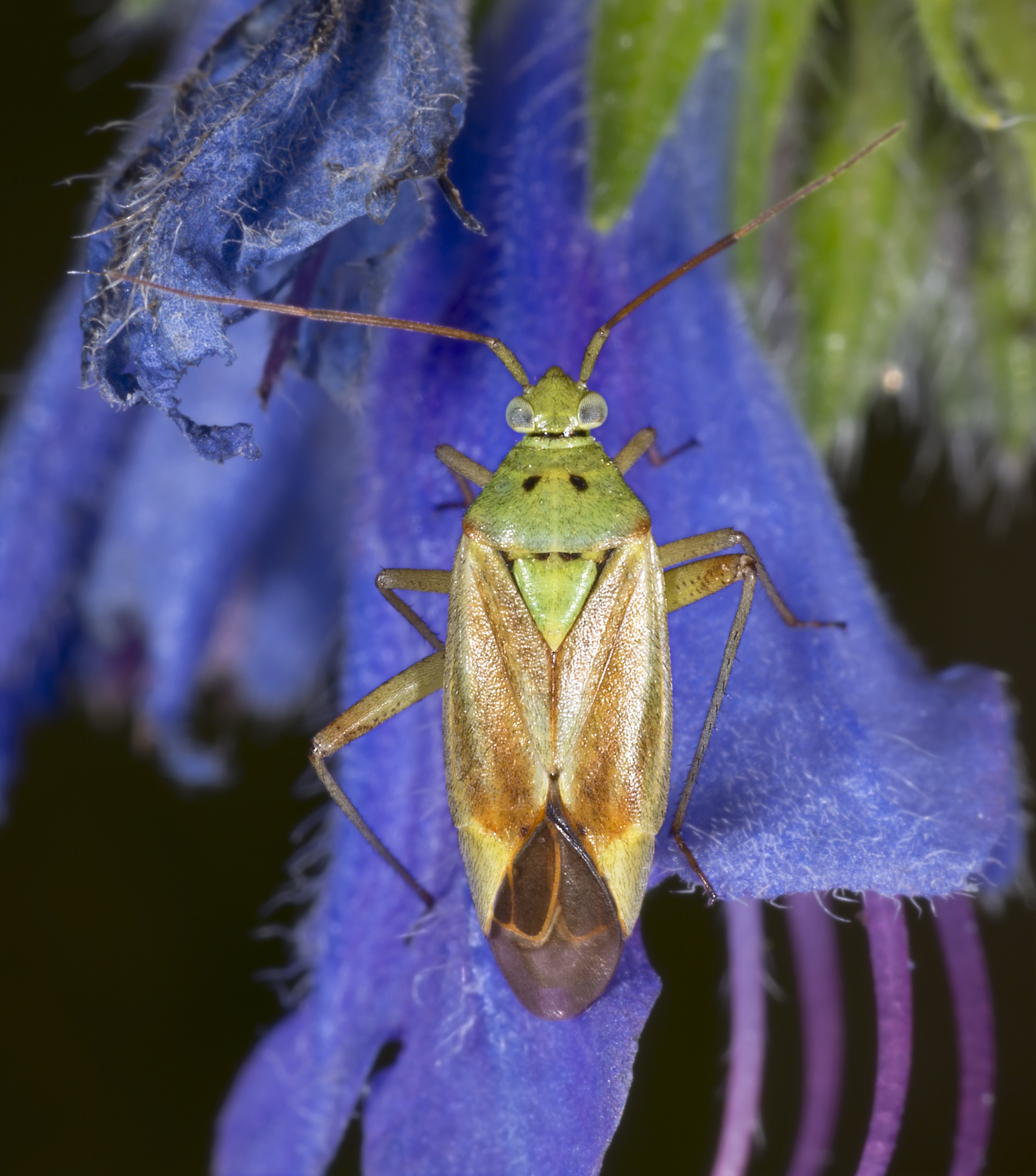

Scientific classification
- Kingdom: Animalia
- Phylum: Arthropoda
- Class: Insecta
- Order: Hemiptera
- Suborder: Heteroptera
- Family: Miridae
- Subfamily: Mirinae
- Tribe: Mirini
- Genus: Closterotomus
- Species: C. norvegicus

Binomial name
- Closterotomus norvegicus (Gmelin, 1790)

= Closterotomus norvegicus =

Species of true bug

Closterotomus norvegicus (also known as the potato capsid) is a species of bugs belonging to the family Miridae, subfamily Mirinae. It can be found feeding on nettle, clover, and cannabis, as well as Compositae, potatoes, carrots and chrysanthemums. They prefer to feed on the flowers, buds and unripe fruit. The species occurs in the Palearctic-British Isles and east across continental Europe to Siberia. It also occurs in the Nearctic as an adventive species. In 1997 it was moved from the genus Calocoris to its current name.

== Description ==
The species is green coloured as a nymph, but when they get to adulthood the colour changes to reddish brown. It does however, vary by territory; for example, specimens from northern Britain are brownish black. The prothorax has two spots, while its scutellum has dark marks.
