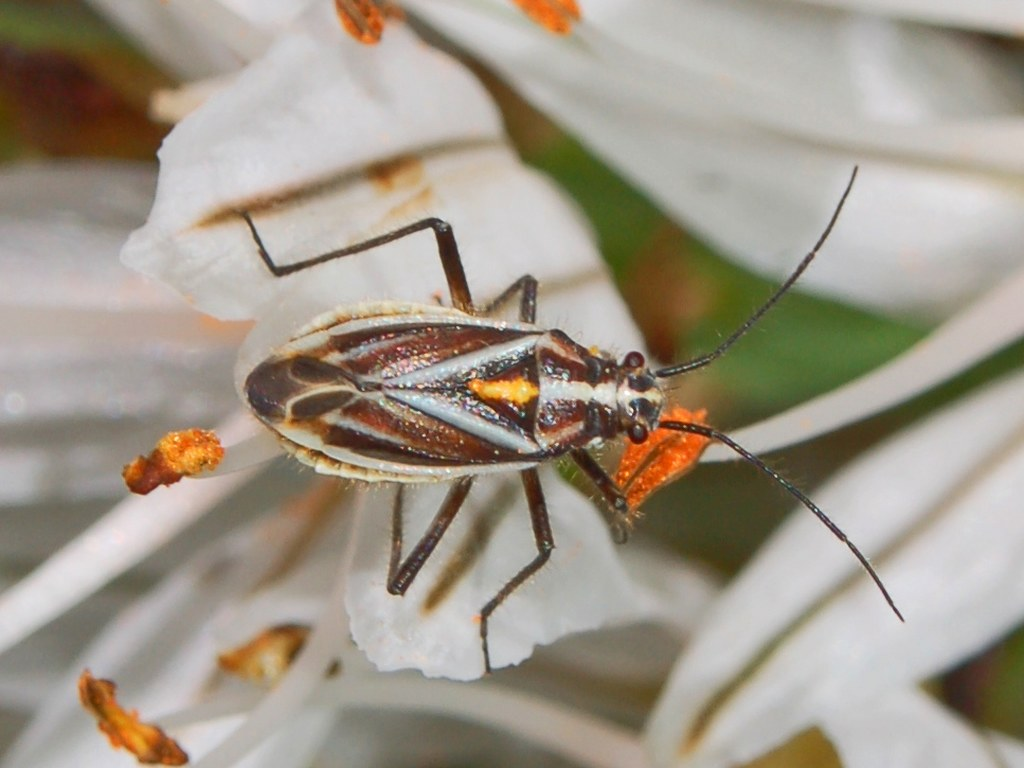
- Horistus orientalis

Scientific classification
- Kingdom: Animalia
- Phylum: Arthropoda
- Class: Insecta
- Order: Hemiptera
- Suborder: Heteroptera
- Family: Miridae
- Tribe: Mirini
- Genus: Horistus; Fieber, 1861

= Horistus =

Genus of true bugs

Horistus is a genus of plant bugs belonging to the family Miridae, subfamily Mirinae.

== Species ==
Species within this genus include:

- Horistus bimaculatus (Jakovlev, 1884)
- Horistus elongatus (Wagner, 1951)
- Horistus infuscatus (Brullé, 1832)
- Horistus orientalis (Gmelin, 1790)
