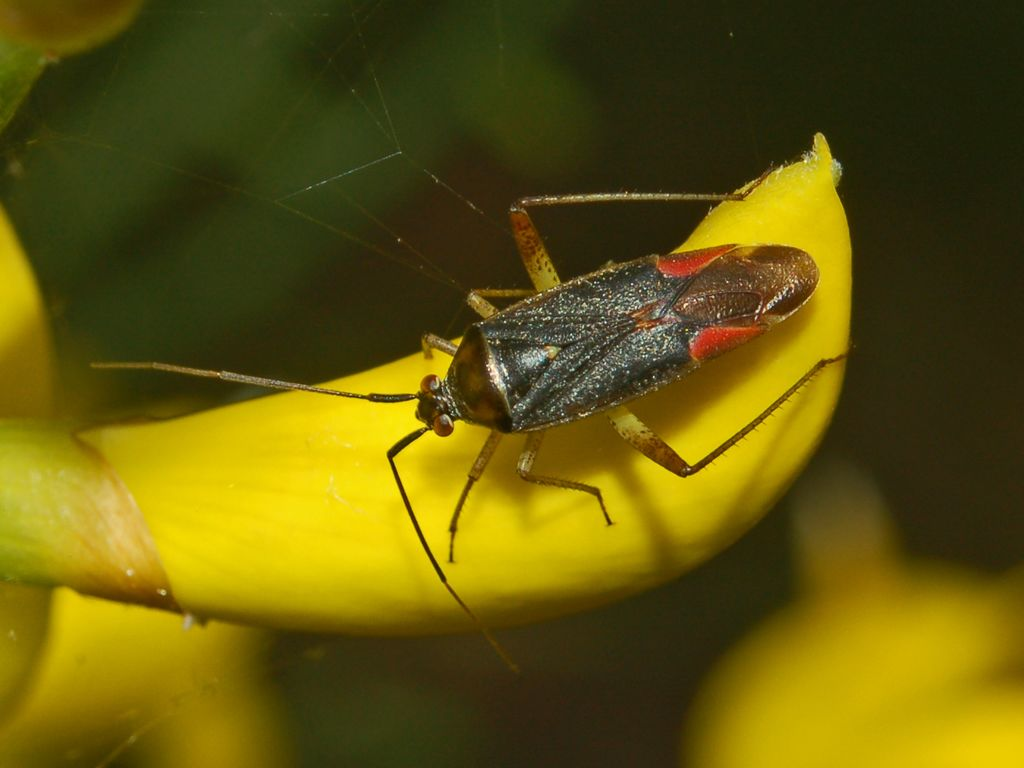
- Closterotomus trivialis - male
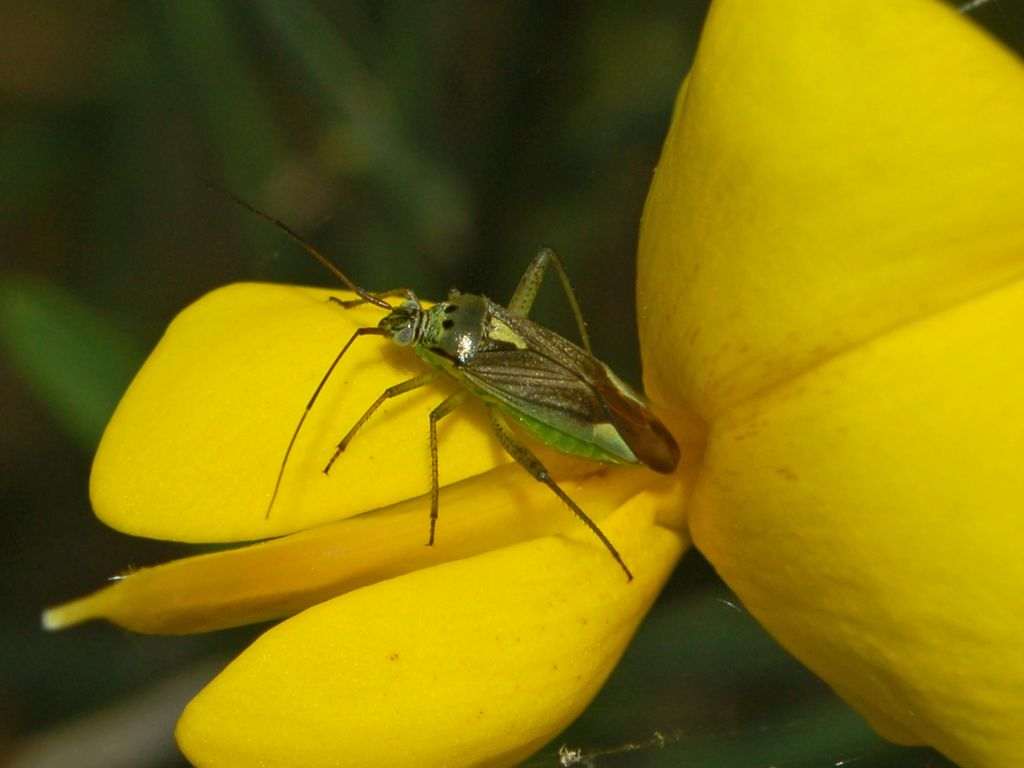
- Closterotomus trivialis - female

Scientific classification
- Kingdom: Animalia
- Phylum: Arthropoda
- Clade: Pancrustacea
- Class: Insecta
- Order: Hemiptera
- Suborder: Heteroptera
- Family: Miridae
- Subfamily: Mirinae
- Tribe: Mirini
- Genus: Closterotomus
- Species: C. trivialis

Binomial name
- Closterotomus trivialis (A. Costa, 1853)

Synonyms
- Calocoris trivialis (A. Costa, 1853)

= Closterotomus trivialis =

Species of true bug

Closterotomus trivialis is a species of plant bugs belonging to the family Miridae, subfamily Mirinae.

== Distribution ==
This species is mainly found in Italy, Greece, Portugal, Spain and Yugoslavia.

== Description ==
Closterotomus trivialis can reach a length of 6.6–7.9 millimetres (0.26–0.31 in). The color of the body is quite variable. In the females the body is usually yellow and green in color, with a yellow green head. Males may be red and black. Pronotum usually shows two central and two lateral black spots.

== Biology ==
In the Mediterranean basin Closterotomus trivialis has been reported as a serious pest of olive and citrus crops. This species has a single annual generation (univoltine) on citrus and overwinters in the egg stage in bark cracks. Females oviposit their eggs at the end of spring. Eggs hatch in late winter to early spring and larvae feed on understorey weeds, mainly on Urtica species and Parietaria officinalis , Urticaceae being the main hosts. The adults feed on buds and young flowers of olives.

== Bibliography ==
- Carvalho, J. C. M. (1959) A catalogue of the Miridae of the world. Part IV.: Arquivos do Museu Nacional, Rio de Janeiro 48: 384 pp.
- Costa, A. (1853) Cimicum Regni Neapolitani Centuria tertia et quartae fragmentum.: Napoli. 77 (73) pp., 2 pls. (Preprint from 1855, Atti R. Inst. Incorrag. Sci. Nat. Napoli 8: 225–299). NOT SEEN
- Eckerlein, H. and E. Wagner. (1965) Ein Beitrag zur Heteropterenfauna Algeriens.: Acta Faunistica Entomologica Musei Nationalis Pragae 11: 195–243.
- Pericart, J. (1965) Contribution a la fanistique de la Corse: Héteroptères Miridae et Anthocoridae (Hem.).: Bulletin Mensuel de la Societe Linneenne de Lyon 34: 377–384.
- Ribes, J. (1965) Hemipteros de Mallorca.: Publ. Inst. Biol. Apl., Barcelona 39: 71–95.
- Ribes, J. and E. Ribes (2003) Sobre algunos Mirinae de Argelia (Hemiptera, Heteroptera, Miridae).: Bulletin de la Société entomologique de France 108: 361–370
- Rosenzweig, V. Y. (1997) Revised classification of the Calocoris complex and related genera (Heteroptera: Miridae).: Zoosystematica Rossica 6: 139–169.
- Tamanini, L. (1981) Gli eterotteri della Basilicata e della Calabria (Italia meridionale) (Hemiptera, Heteroptera).: Memorie del Museo civico di storia naturale di Verona, ser. 2, A, 3: 1--164.
