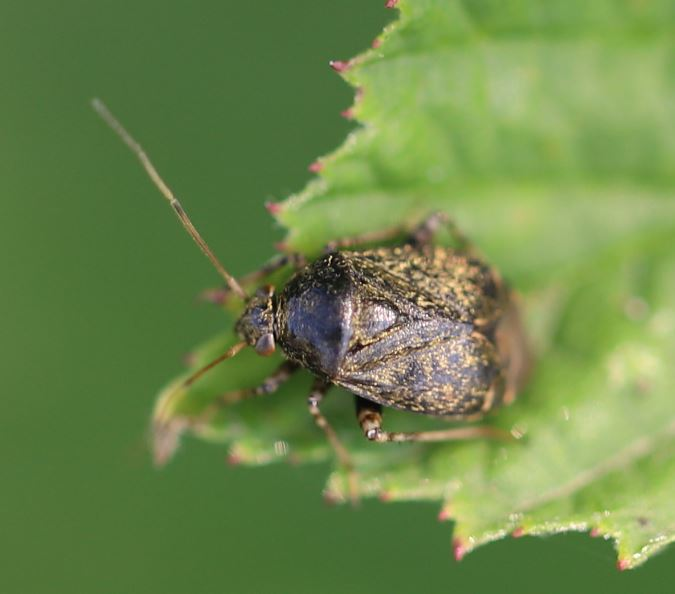
- Charagochilus gyllenhalii

Scientific classification
- Domain: Eukaryota
- Kingdom: Animalia
- Phylum: Arthropoda
- Class: Insecta
- Order: Hemiptera
- Suborder: Heteroptera
- Family: Miridae
- Subfamily: Mirinae
- Tribe: Mirini
- Genus: Charagochilus; Fieber, 1858

= Charagochilus =

Genus of true bugs

Charagochilus is a genus of true bugs belonging to the family Miridae.

The genus was first described by Fieber in 1858.

The species of this genus are found in Eurasia and Australia.

Species include:

- Charagochilus gyllenhalii (Fallen, 1807)
- Charagochilus weberi
