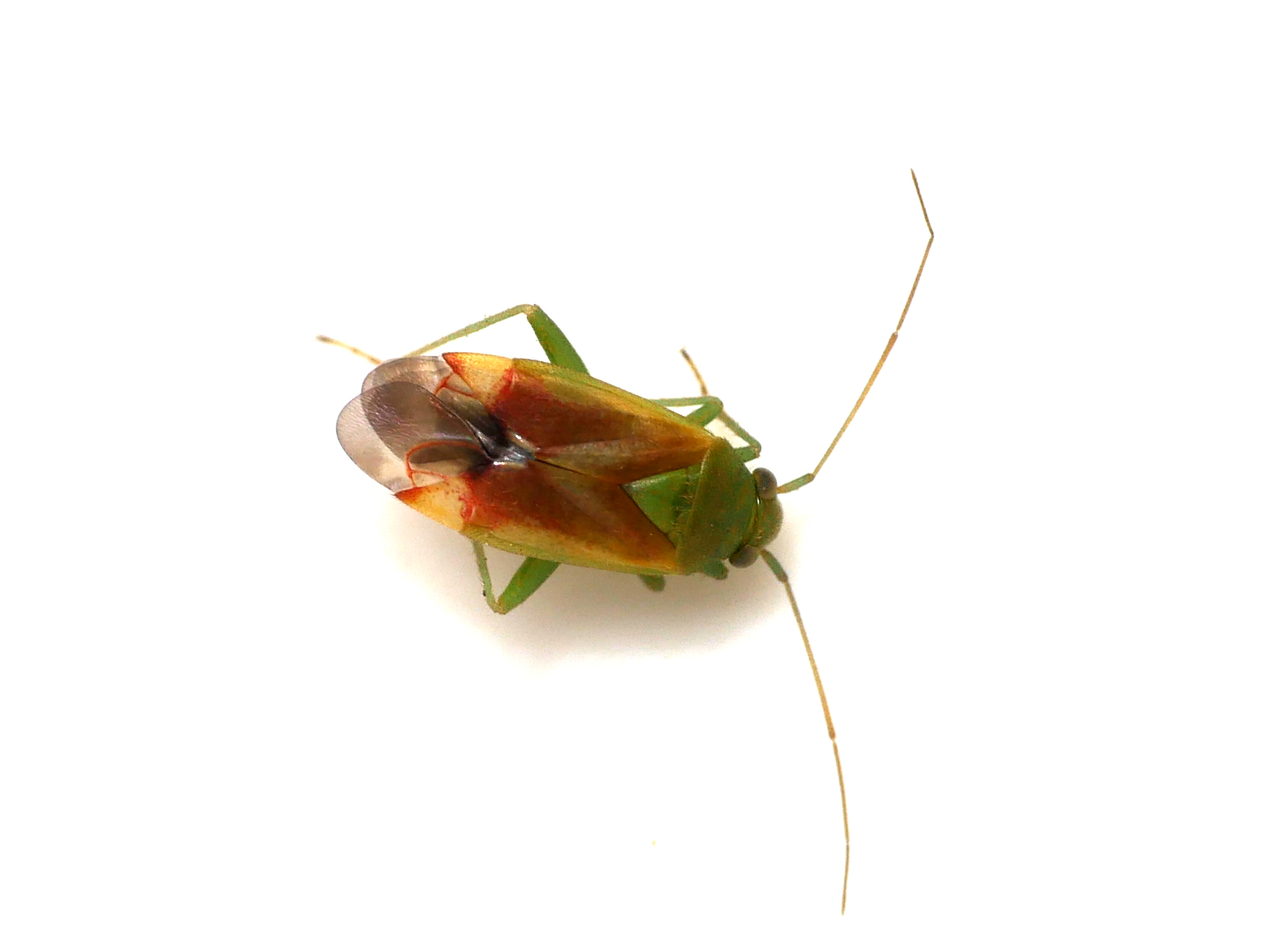
- Dichrooscytus gustavi

Scientific classification
- Kingdom: Animalia
- Phylum: Arthropoda
- Clade: Pancrustacea
- Class: Insecta
- Order: Hemiptera
- Suborder: Heteroptera
- Family: Miridae
- Subfamily: Mirinae
- Tribe: Mirini
- Genus: Dichrooscytus; Fieber, 1858

= Dichrooscytus =

Genus of true bugs

Dichrooscytus is a genus of plant bugs in the family Miridae. There are more than 70 described species in the genus Dichrooscytus.

== Species ==
These 77 species belong to the genus Dichrooscytus:

- Dichrooscytus abietis Bliven, 1956
- Dichrooscytus adamsi Knight, 1968
- Dichrooscytus albidovirens Reuter, 1896
- Dichrooscytus algiricus Wagner, 1951
- Dichrooscytus alpinus Kelton, 1972
- Dichrooscytus altaicus Josifov, 1974
- Dichrooscytus angustifrons Knight, 1968
- Dichrooscytus apicalis Knight, 1968
- Dichrooscytus asanovae Josifov, 1974
- Dichrooscytus aztecus Kelton, 1972
- Dichrooscytus barberi Knight, 1925
- Dichrooscytus brevirostris Kelton, 1972
- Dichrooscytus bureschi Josifov, 1974
- Dichrooscytus consobrinus Horvath, 1904
- Dichrooscytus consorbinus Horvath, 1904
- Dichrooscytus convexifrons Knight, 1968
- Dichrooscytus cuneatus Knight, 1968
- Dichrooscytus cyprius Lindberg, 1948
- Dichrooscytus dalmatinus Wagner, 1951
- Dichrooscytus deleticus Knight, 1968
- Dichrooscytus dentatus Kelton, 1972
- Dichrooscytus elegans Heidemann, 1892
- Dichrooscytus flagellatus Kelton, 1972
- Dichrooscytus flagitiosus Kelton & Schaffner, 1972
- Dichrooscytus flavescens Knight, 1968
- Dichrooscytus flavivenosus Knight, 1968
- Dichrooscytus fuscosignatus Knight, 1968
- Dichrooscytus gustavi Josifov, 1981
- Dichrooscytus impros Heiss, 1988
- Dichrooscytus inermis Wagner, 1974
- Dichrooscytus intermedius Reuter, 1885
- Dichrooscytus irroratus Van Duzee, 1912
- Dichrooscytus josifovi Kerzhner, 1997
- Dichrooscytus juniperi Lindberg, 1948
- Dichrooscytus junipericola Knight, 1968
- Dichrooscytus kerzhneri Josifov, 1974
- Dichrooscytus kiritshenkoi Josifov, 1974
- Dichrooscytus lagopinus Bliven, 1956
- Dichrooscytus latifrons Knight, 1968
- Dichrooscytus longirostris Kelton, 1972
- Dichrooscytus maculatus Van Duzee, 1912
- Dichrooscytus major Wagner, 1962
- Dichrooscytus mexicanus Kelton, 1972
- Dichrooscytus minimus Knight, 1968
- Dichrooscytus minutus Kelton & Schaffner, 1972
- Dichrooscytus nanae Wagner, 1957
- Dichrooscytus nitidus Knight, 1968
- Dichrooscytus ochreus Kelton, 1972
- Dichrooscytus oxycedri
- Dichrooscytus persicus Josifov, 1974
- Dichrooscytus pinicola Knight, 1968
- Dichrooscytus pseudosabinae Reuter, 1896
- Dichrooscytus putshkovi Josifov, 1974
- Dichrooscytus rainieri Knight, 1968
- Dichrooscytus repletus (Heidemann, 1892)
- Dichrooscytus rostratus Kelton, 1972
- Dichrooscytus ruberellus Knight, 1968
- Dichrooscytus rubidus Kelton, 1972
- Dichrooscytus rubromaculatus Kelton, 1972
- Dichrooscytus rufipennis (Fallén, 1807)
- Dichrooscytus rufivenosus Knight, 1968
- Dichrooscytus rufusculus Kelton, 1972
- Dichrooscytus rugosus Knight, 1968
- Dichrooscytus seidenstueckeri Josifov, 1974
- Dichrooscytus sequoiae Bliven, 1954
- Dichrooscytus suspectus Reuter, 1909
- Dichrooscytus taosensis Kelton & Schaffner, 1972
- Dichrooscytus tauricus Seidenstucker, 1954
- Dichrooscytus tescorum Bliven, 1956
- Dichrooscytus texanus Kelton & Schaffner, 1972
- Dichrooscytus toltecus Kelton, 1972
- Dichrooscytus uhleri Wheeler & Henry, 1975
- Dichrooscytus utahensis Knight, 1968
- Dichrooscytus valesianus Fieber, 1861
- Dichrooscytus visendus Bliven, 1956
- Dichrooscytus vittatipennis Knight, 1968
- Dichrooscytus vittatus Van Duzee, 1921
