= Taedia marmorata =

Scientific classification
- Kingdom: Animalia
- Phylum: Arthropoda
- Class: Insecta
- Order: Hemiptera
- Suborder: Heteroptera
- Family: Miridae
- Tribe: Mirini
- Genus: Taedia
- Species: T. marmorata

Binomial name
- Taedia marmorata (Uhler, 1894)

Species of true bug

Taedia marmorata is a species of plant bug in the family Miridae. It is found in Central America and North America.
