= Taedia albifacies =

Scientific classification
- Kingdom: Animalia
- Phylum: Arthropoda
- Class: Insecta
- Order: Hemiptera
- Suborder: Heteroptera
- Family: Miridae
- Tribe: Mirini
- Genus: Taedia
- Species: T. albifacies

Binomial name
- Taedia albifacies (Knight, 1930)

Species of true bug

Taedia albifacies is a species of plant bug in the family Miridae. It is found in North America.
