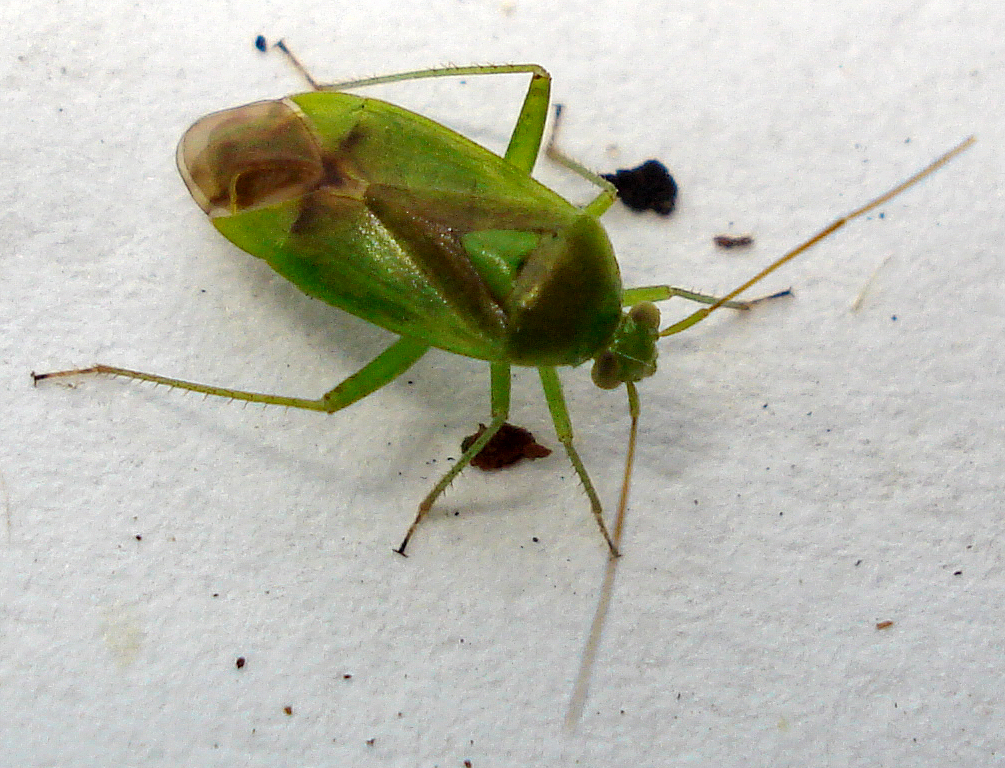
- Neolygus viridis depicted in Edward Saunders Hemiptera Heteroptera of the British Islands (figure 2)

Scientific classification
- Kingdom: Animalia
- Phylum: Arthropoda
- Class: Insecta
- Order: Hemiptera
- Suborder: Heteroptera
- Family: Miridae
- Genus: Neolygus
- Species: N. viridis

Binomial name
- Neolygus viridis (Fallén, 1807)

= Neolygus viridis =

Species of true bug

Neolygus viridis is a true bug. The species is found in the Palearctic, from Europe (with the exception of the southern parts of the Mediterranean) to Siberia and the Russian Far East, and it is common and widespread in Central Europe. It occurs in semi-shady to open places with high humidity, such as around the edges of woods or meadows, but also on isolated trees.

Neolygus viridis lives on deciduous trees; (Tilia, Alnus, Rhamnus, Salix, Betula, Acer and Corylus). Occasionally they are largely predatory. Overwinters occurs as the egg and there is one generation per year. The adult bugs occur from June, they die no later than September.
