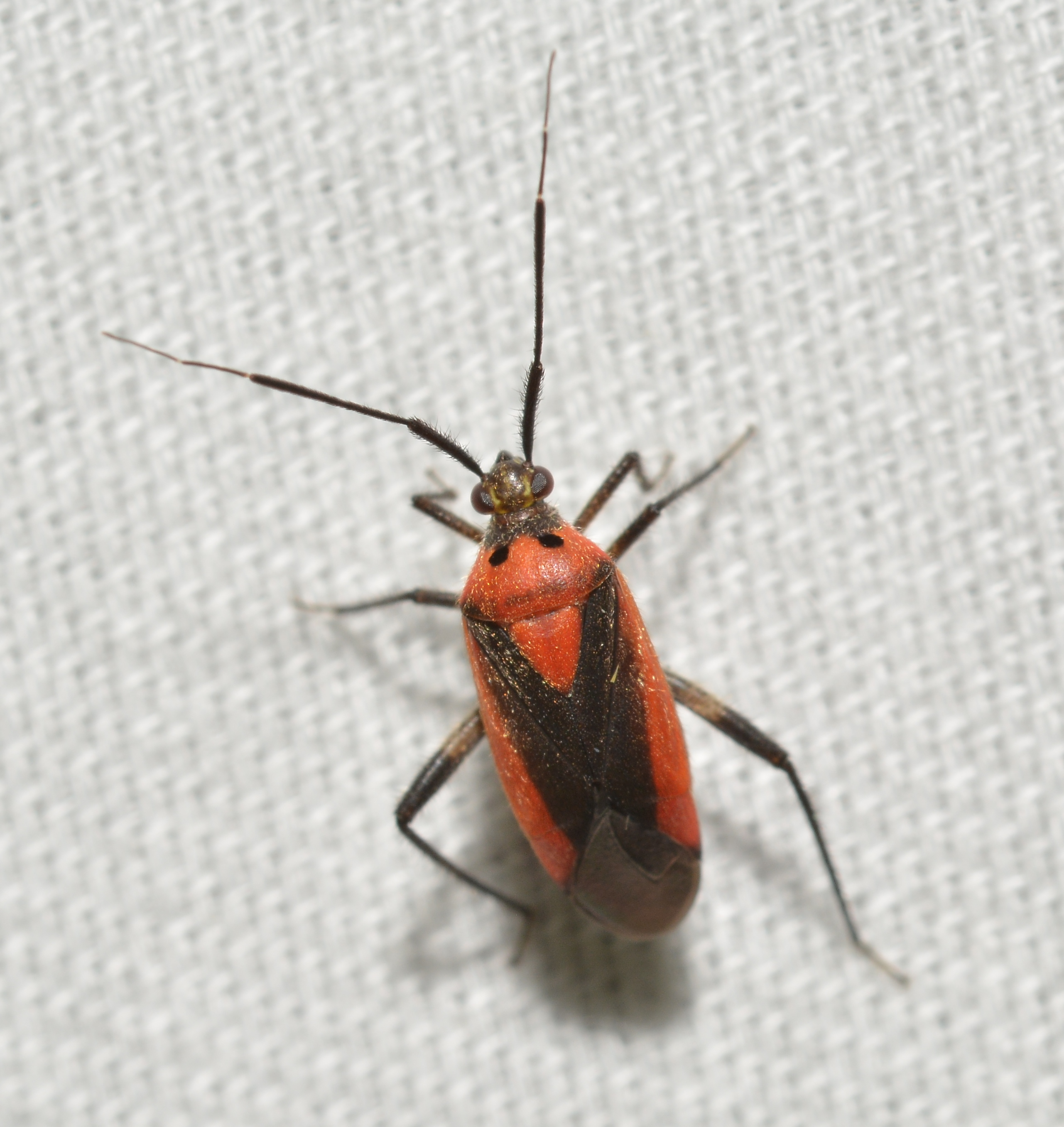

Scientific classification
- Kingdom: Animalia
- Phylum: Arthropoda
- Clade: Pancrustacea
- Class: Insecta
- Order: Hemiptera
- Suborder: Heteroptera
- Family: Miridae
- Tribe: Mirini
- Genus: Taedia
- Species: T. scrupea

Binomial name
- Taedia scrupea (Say, 1832)

= Taedia scrupea =

Species of true bug

Taedia scrupea is a species of plant bug in the family Miridae. It is found in Central America and North America. It is known to eat Vitis riparia, and its size varies from 6 to 7.5 millimeters in length.
