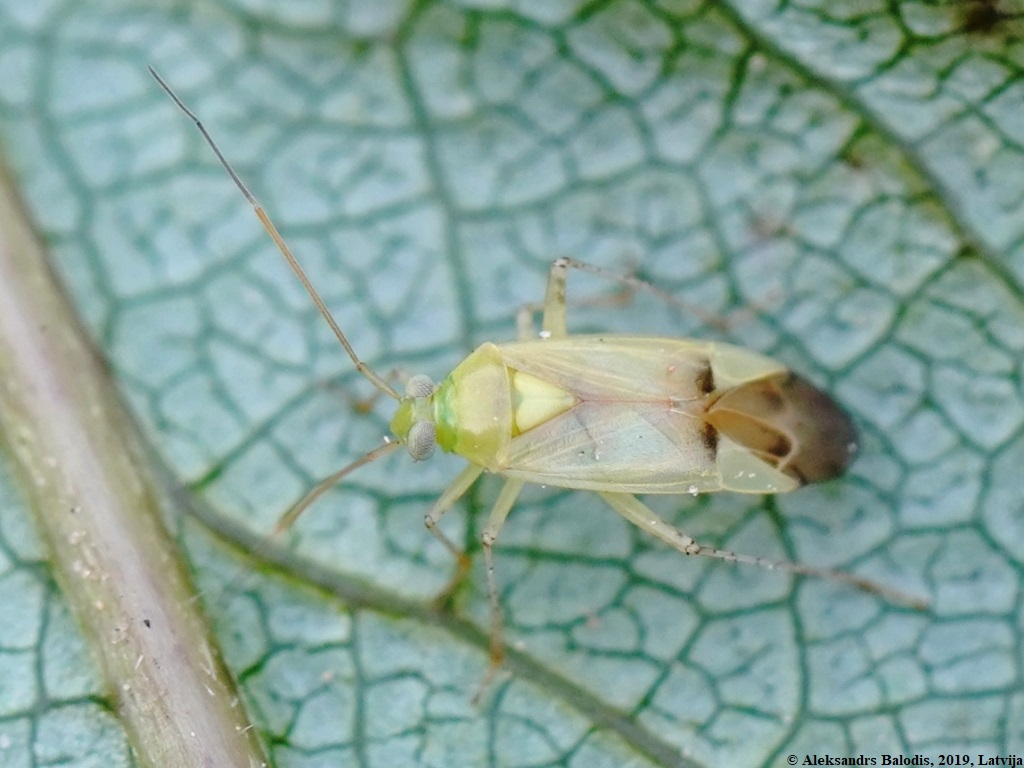
- Neolygus contaminatus Latvia

Scientific classification
- Domain: Eukaryota
- Kingdom: Animalia
- Phylum: Arthropoda
- Class: Insecta
- Order: Hemiptera
- Suborder: Heteroptera
- Family: Miridae
- Genus: Neolygus
- Species: N. contaminatus

Binomial name
- Neolygus contaminatus (Fallen 1807)

= Neolygus contaminatus =

Species of true bug

Neolygus contaminatus is a Palearctic species of true bug.
