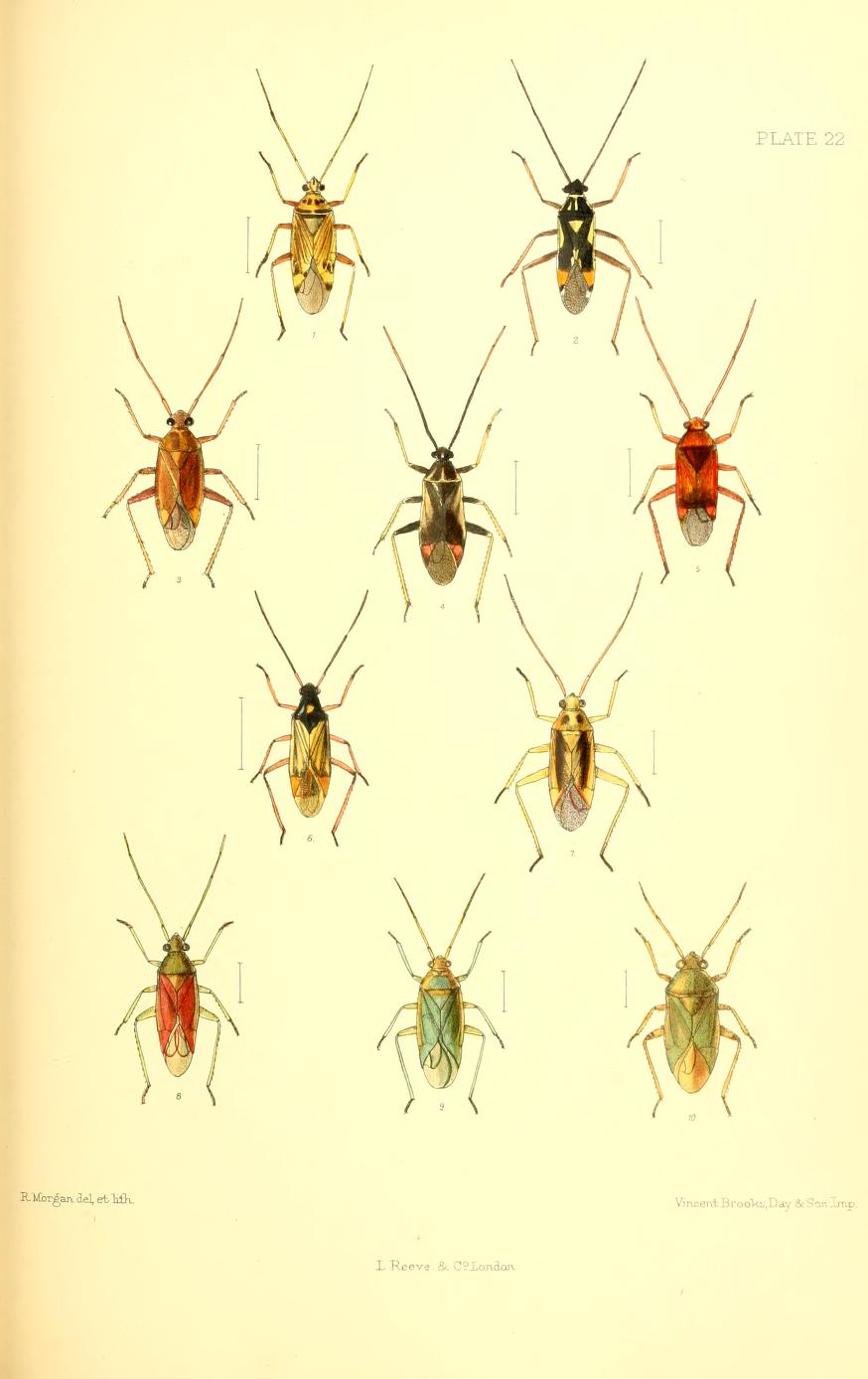
- Dichrooscytus rufipennis depicted in Edward Saunders figure 8

Scientific classification
- Kingdom: Animalia
- Phylum: Arthropoda
- Clade: Pancrustacea
- Class: Insecta
- Order: Hemiptera
- Suborder: Heteroptera
- Family: Miridae
- Genus: Dichrooscytus
- Species: D. rufipennis

Binomial name
- Dichrooscytus rufipennis (Fallen 1807)

= Dichrooscytus rufipennis =

Species of true bug

Dichrooscytus rufipennis is a Palearctic species of true bug.
