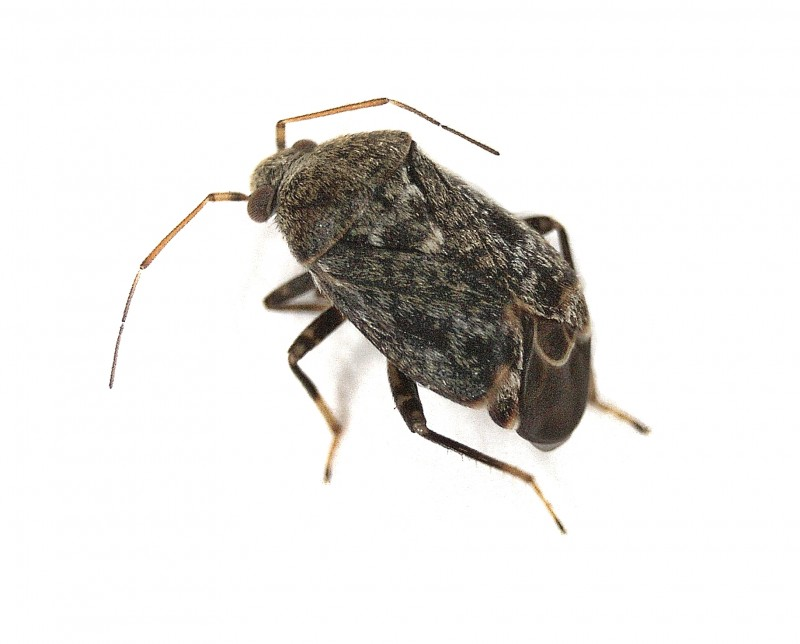
- Charagochilus gyllenhalii Elst (Gld), the Netherlands

Scientific classification
- Kingdom: Animalia
- Phylum: Arthropoda
- Class: Insecta
- Order: Hemiptera
- Suborder: Heteroptera
- Family: Miridae
- Genus: Charagochilus
- Species: C. gyllenhalii

Binomial name
- Charagochilus gyllenhalii (Fallen, 1807)

= Charagochilus gyllenhalii =

Species of true bug

Charagochilus gyllenhalii is a Palearctic species of true bug.
