= Dichrooscytus elegans =

Scientific classification
- Kingdom: Animalia
- Phylum: Arthropoda
- Class: Insecta
- Order: Hemiptera
- Suborder: Heteroptera
- Family: Miridae
- Tribe: Mirini
- Genus: Dichrooscytus
- Species: D. elegans

Binomial name
- Dichrooscytus elegans Heidemann, 1892

Species of true bug

Dichrooscytus elegans is a species of plant bug in the family Miridae. It is found in North America.
