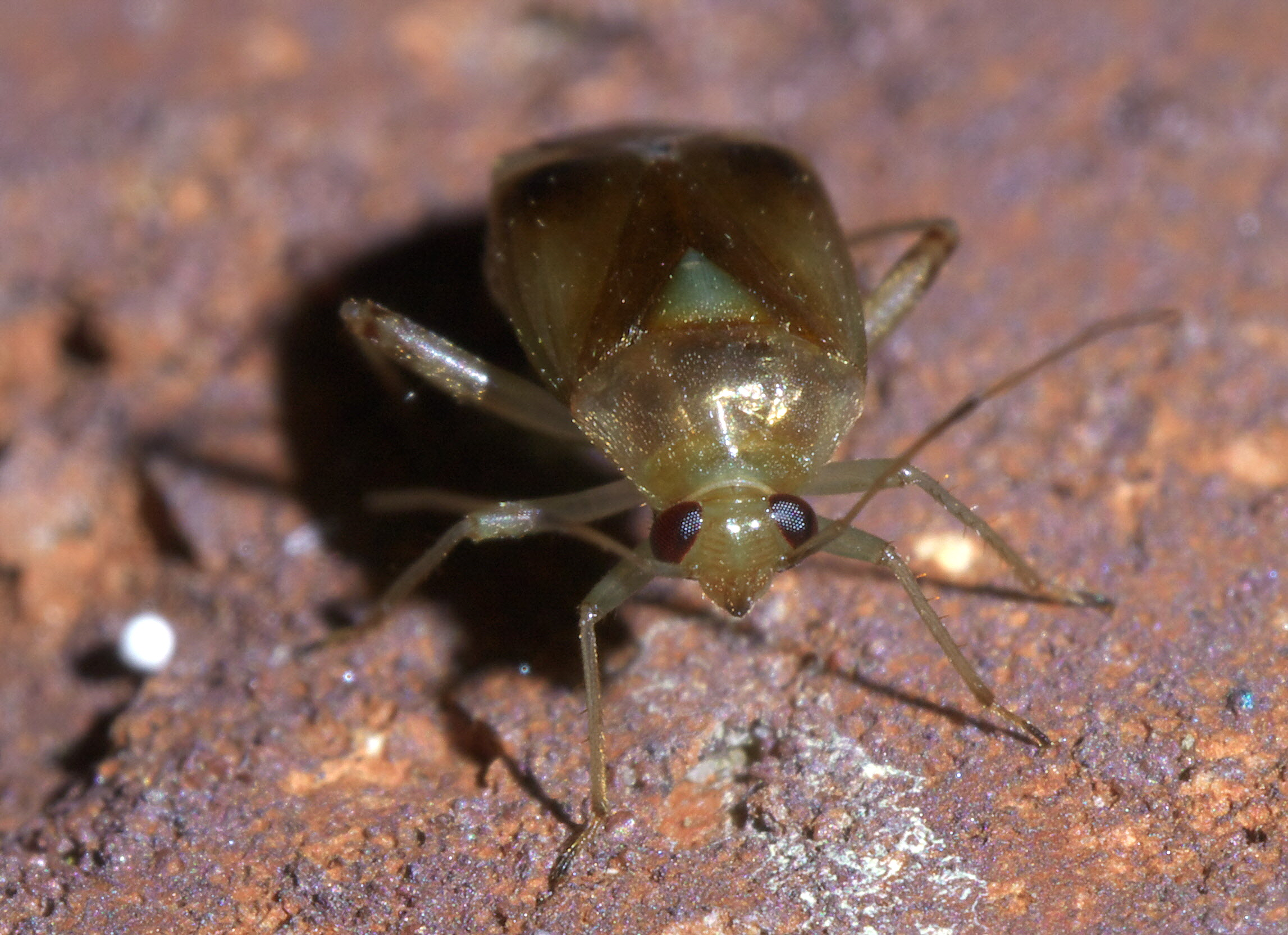

Scientific classification
- Kingdom: Animalia
- Phylum: Arthropoda
- Clade: Pancrustacea
- Class: Insecta
- Order: Hemiptera
- Suborder: Heteroptera
- Family: Miridae
- Subfamily: Mirinae
- Tribe: Mirini
- Genus: Neolygus; Knight, 1917

= Neolygus =

Genus of true bugs

Neolygus is a genus of plant bugs in the family Miridae. There are at least 110 described species in Neolygus.

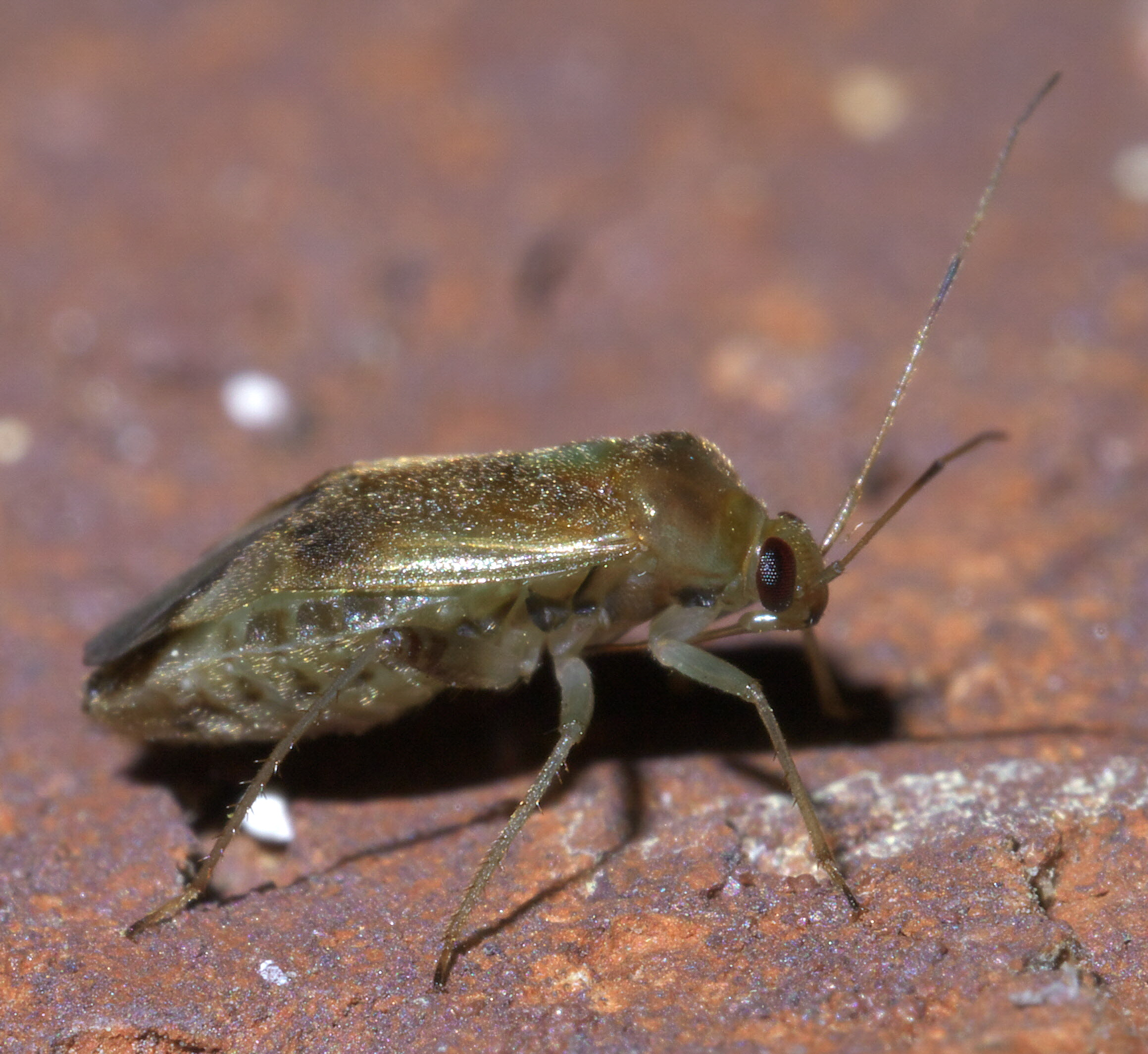

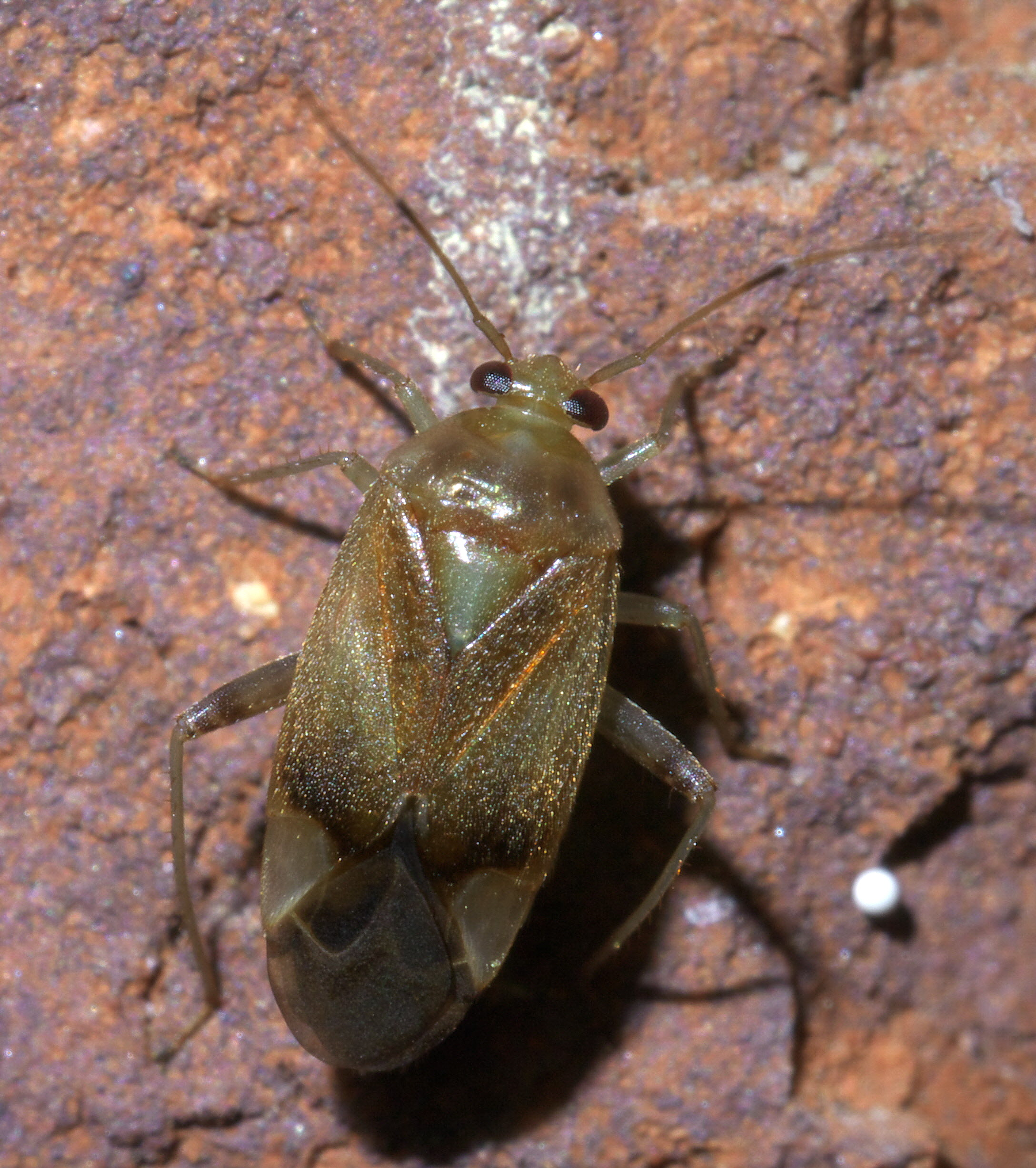

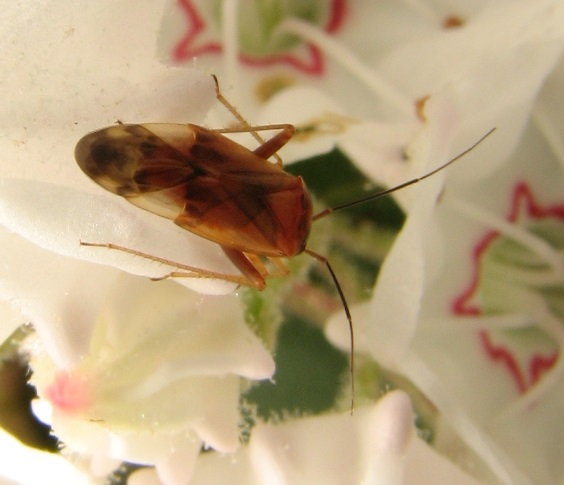
Neolygus laureae on mountain mint

== See also ==
- List of Neolygus species
