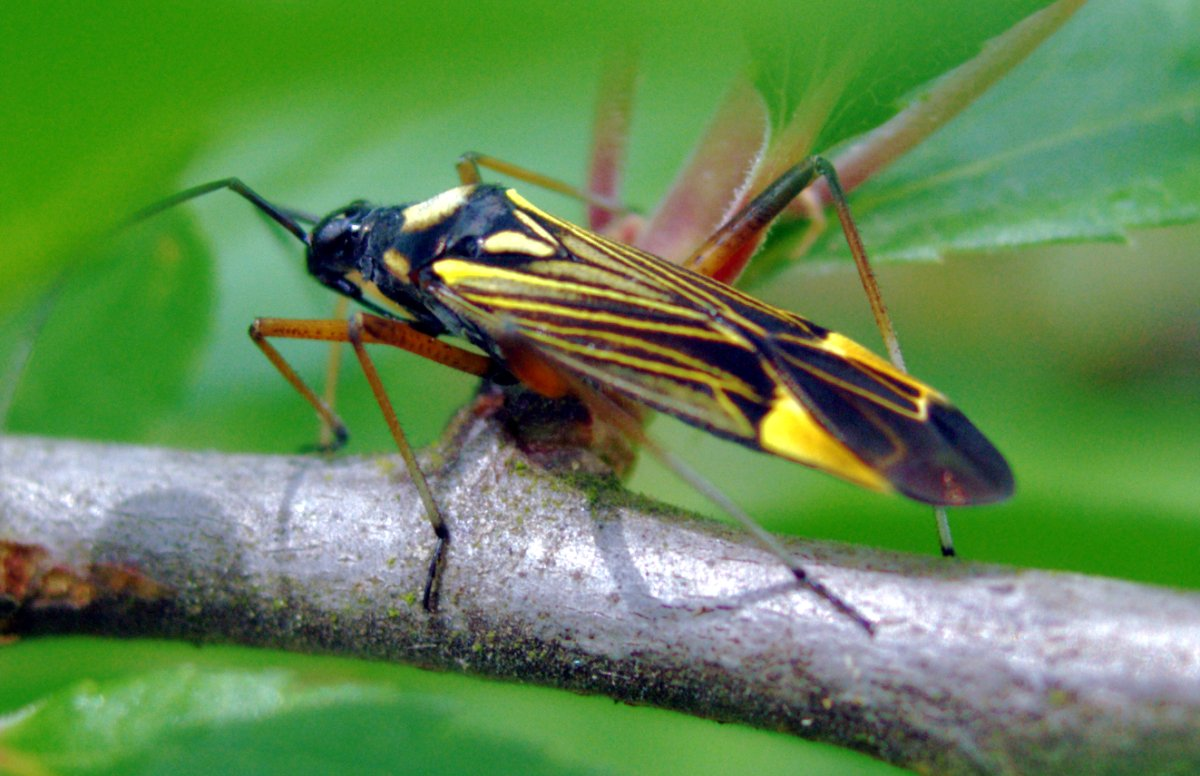
- Miris striatus, Münster, Germany, 2004

Scientific classification
- Kingdom: Animalia
- Phylum: Arthropoda
- Clade: Pancrustacea
- Class: Insecta
- Order: Hemiptera
- Suborder: Heteroptera
- Family: Miridae
- Subfamily: Mirinae
- Tribe: Mirini; Hahn, 1831

Tribes
- See text

= Mirinae =

Subfamily of true bugs

Mirinae is a subfamily of plant bugs, insects in the family Miridae.

== Tribes ==
- Herdoniini
- Hyalopeplini
- Mecistoscelini
- Mirini
- Restheniini
- Scutelliferini
- Stenodemini
