= List of Prepops species =

This is a list of 198 species in Prepops, a genus of plant bugs in the family Miridae.

== Prepops species ==
- Prepops accinctus (Distant, 1893)^{c g}
- Prepops adluteiceps Carvalho, 1988^{c g}
- Prepops albomarginatus (Reuter, 1910)^{c g}
- Prepops alienus (Reuter, 1910)^{c g}
- Prepops anasueliae Carvalho and Fontes, 1970^{c g}
- Prepops areatus (Reuter, 1910)^{c g}
- Prepops atratus (Distant, 1883)^{c g}
- Prepops atripennis (Reuter, 1876)^{i c g}
- Prepops atroluteus (Walker, 1873)^{c g}
- Prepops bachmanni Carvalho and Carpintero, 1990^{c g}
- Prepops bahiensis Carvalho, 1975^{c g}
- Prepops banosus Carvalho, 1988^{c g}
- Prepops barueriensis Carvalho, 1988^{c g}
- Prepops bastensis Carvalho and Costa, 1991^{c g}
- Prepops bechynei Carvalho, 1988^{c g}
- Prepops beniensis Carvalho, 1988^{c g}
- Prepops bicolor (Distant, 1883)^{c}
- Prepops bicoloroides Carvalho and Schaffner, 1987^{c g}
- Prepops bivittatus (Stål, 1860)^{c g}
- Prepops bivittis (Stål, 1862)^{i c g b}
- Prepops bolivianus Carvalho and Fontes, 1969^{c g}
- Prepops borealis (Knight, 1923)^{i c g b}
- Prepops caatinganus Carvalho, 1988^{c g}
- Prepops cajuruensis Carvalho and Costa, 1991^{c g}
- Prepops caliensis Carvalho, 1989^{c g}
- Prepops candelariensis Hernandez and Henry, 2010^{c g}
- Prepops canelae Carvalho and Fontes, 1970^{c g}
- Prepops caracensis Carvalho, 1974^{c g}
- Prepops carioca Carvalho and Fontes, 1970^{c g}
- Prepops casualis Carvalho, 1988^{c g}
- Prepops catamarcanus Carvalho, 1988^{c g}
- Prepops catarinensis Carvalho and Fontes, 1970^{c g}
- Prepops championi (Carvalho, 1952)^{c g}
- Prepops chanchamaianus Carvalho, 1988^{c g}
- Prepops circumcinctus (Say, 1832)^{i c g b}
- Prepops circummaculatus (Stål, 1854)^{c g}
- Prepops columbiensis (Carvalho and Fontes, 1972)^{c g}
- Prepops comarapanus Carvalho, 1988^{c g}
- Prepops commissuralis (Reuter, 1910)^{c g}
- Prepops concinnoides Carvalho, 1988^{c g}
- Prepops concinnus (Stål, 1860)^{c g}
- Prepops concisus (Knight, 1929)^{i c g}
- Prepops confraternus (Uhler, 1872)^{i c g}
- Prepops cordobanus Carvalho and Fontes, 1969^{c g}
- Prepops correntinoides Carvalho and Carpintero, 1987^{c g}
- Prepops costalis (Stål, 1860)^{c g}
- Prepops crassicornis (Reuter, 1910)^{c g}
- Prepops cruciferoides Carvalho and Fontes, 1970^{c g}
- Prepops crucifera (Berg, 1879)^{i c g}
- Prepops cruxnigra (Reuter, 1910)^{c g}
- Prepops cubanus Carvalho and Schaffner, 1974^{c g}
- Prepops cuzcoensis Carvalho, 1988^{c g}
- Prepops decoratus (Reuter, 1910)^{c g}
- Prepops diamantinensis Carvalho, 1984^{c g}
- Prepops diminutus Carvalho and Fontes, 1973^{i c g}
- Prepops dissociatus (Berg, 1892)^{c g}
- Prepops divisus (Herrich-Schaeffer, 1850)^{i c g}
- Prepops englemani Carvalho and Schaffner, 1987^{c g}
- Prepops entrerianus Carvalho and Carpintero, 1987^{c g}
- Prepops eremicola (Knight, 1929)^{i c g}
- Prepops erubescens (Distant, 1883)^{c g}
- Prepops falloui (Bergroth, 1898)^{c g}
- Prepops fernandopolis Carvalho, 1988^{c g}
- Prepops fiuzai Carvalho and Fontes, 1973^{c g}
- Prepops flavicostus (Berg, 1884)^{c g}
- Prepops flavoniger (Stål, 1860)^{c g}
- Prepops flavovarius (Reuter, 1910)^{c g}
- Prepops fragosoi Carvalho, 1988^{c g}
- Prepops fraterculus (Knight, 1923)^{i c g}
- Prepops fraternus (Knight, 1923)^{i c g b}
- Prepops frontalis (Reuter, 1905)^{i c g}
- Prepops goianus Carvalho and Costa, 1992^{c g}
- Prepops gracilis (Reuter, 1910)^{c g}
- Prepops guanduensis Carvalho and Costa, 1991^{c g}
- Prepops guaranianus Carvalho and Fontes, 1970^{c g}
- Prepops guttaticeps (Reuter, 1910)^{c g}
- Prepops hambletoni Carvalho, 1988^{c g}
- Prepops hogbergi (Stål, 1862)^{c g}
- Prepops horvathi (Reuter, 1910)^{c g}
- Prepops howardi (Reuter, 1910)^{c g}
- Prepops huanucanus Carvalho, 1974^{c g}
- Prepops huascaraiensis Carvalho, 1988^{c g}
- Prepops iconnicoffi (Reuter, 1910)^{c g}
- Prepops iguazuensis Carvalho and Carpintero, 1987^{c g}
- Prepops imperatrizensis Carvalho and Costa, 1991^{c g}
- Prepops insignis (Say, 1832)^{i c g}
- Prepops insitivoides Carvalho and Fontes, 1969^{c g}
- Prepops insitivus (Say, 1832)^{i c g b}
- Prepops interpunctus (Distant, 1883)^{c g}
- Prepops itatiaiensis Carvalho and Fontes, 1968^{c g}
- Prepops jamaicensis (Walker, 1873)^{c g}
- Prepops koschevnikovi (Reuter, 1910)^{c g}
- Prepops latipennis (Stål, 1862)^{c g}
- Prepops liliae Carvalho, 1988^{c g}
- Prepops limbicollis (Reuter, 1910)^{c g}
- Prepops lineatus Carvalho, 1975^{c g}
- Prepops lopesi Carvalho and Fontes, 1973^{c g}
- Prepops luteiceps (Stal, 1859)^{c g}
- Prepops luteofasciatus (Distant, 1883)^{c g}
- Prepops maldonadoi Carvalho and Fontes, 1973^{c g}
- Prepops malkini Carvalho, 1988^{c g}
- Prepops marginalis (Reuter, 1910)^{c g}
- Prepops mariliensis Carvalho and Costa, 1991^{c g}
- Prepops meinerti (Reuter, 1905)^{c g}
- Prepops mielkei Carvalho, 1988^{c g}
- Prepops mimosus Carvalho and Fontes, 1970^{c g}
- Prepops minensis Carvalho and Fontes, 1970^{c g}
- Prepops minutulus (Reuter, 1910)^{c g}
- Prepops missionesus Carvalho, 1988^{c g}
- Prepops montevidensis (Berg, 1883)^{c g}
- Prepops montivagus (Distant, 1883)^{c g}
- Prepops nicaraguensis Carvalho and Schaffner, 1987^{c g}
- Prepops nigricollis (Reuter, 1876)^{i c g}
- Prepops nigripennis (Stål, 1860)^{c g}
- Prepops nigripilus (Knight, 1929)^{i c g b}
- Prepops nigritus Carvalho, 1988^{c g}
- Prepops nigroscutellatus (Knight, 1923)^{i c g}
- Prepops nigrus Carvalho and Fontes, 1970^{c g}
- Prepops nitidipennis (Reuter, 1910)^{c g}
- Prepops nobilis (Reuter, 1910)^{c g}
- Prepops notaticollis (Reuter, 1910)^{c g}
- Prepops nuevoleonensis Carvalho and Schaffner, 1987^{c g}
- Prepops oaxacaenus Carvalho and Schaffner, 1974^{c g}
- Prepops obscurans (Distant, 1883)^{c g}
- Prepops olmosensis Carvalho, 1988^{c g}
- Prepops omphalophorus (Reuter, 1910)^{c g}
- Prepops palatanganus Carvalho, 1988^{c g}
- Prepops paraensis Carvalho and Fontes, 1971^{c g}
- Prepops paraguaiensis Carvalho and Fontes, 1970^{c g}
- Prepops paranaensis Carvalho and Fontes, 1969^{c g}
- Prepops patricius (Reuter, 1910)^{c g}
- Prepops paulistanus Carvalho and Fontes, 1970^{c g}
- Prepops pauloi Carvalho, 1988^{c g}
- Prepops pentheri (Reuter, 1907)^{c g}
- Prepops persignandus (Distant, 1883)^{i c g}
- Prepops persimilis (Reuter, 1907)^{c g}
- Prepops peruvianus (Reuter, 1910)^{c g}
- Prepops piraporanus Carvalho, 1988^{c g}
- Prepops platensis (Berg, 1878)^{c g}
- Prepops plaumann Carvalho, 1989^{c g}
- Prepops plenus (Distant, 1883)^{c g}
- Prepops poppii (Bergroth, 1910)^{c g}
- Prepops prepopsoides Carvalho, 1974^{c g}
- Prepops procorrentinus Carvalho and Carpintero, 1992^{c g}
- Prepops quadriguttatus Carvalho and Fontes, 1970^{c g}
- Prepops riodocensis Carvalho, 1988^{c g}
- Prepops robustus (Reuter, 1913)^{i}
- Prepops rollei (Reuter, 1910)^{c g}
- Prepops rondoniensis Carvalho, 1988^{c g}
- Prepops roppai Carvalho, 1974^{c g}
- Prepops rubellicollis (Knight, 1923)^{i c g}
- Prepops rubroscutellatus (Knight, 1929)^{i c g b}
- Prepops rubrovittatus (Stål, 1862)^{i c g b}
- Prepops rufocapitis Carvalho and Fontes, 1971^{c g}
- Prepops rurrenabaquensis Carvalho and Costa, 1991^{c g}
- Prepops saltensis Carvalho and Fontes, 1970^{c g}
- Prepops santiagoensis Hernandez and Henry, 2010^{c g}
- Prepops schaffneri Carvalho and Fontes, 1973^{c g}
- Prepops semifemoratus Carvalho and Costa, 1992^{c g}
- Prepops seminiger (Stål, 1860)^{c g}
- Prepops serranus Carvalho and Fontes, 1969^{c g}
- Prepops setosipes (Reuter, 1910)^{c g}
- Prepops signifer (Reuter, 1910)^{c g}
- Prepops similaris Carvalho and Fontes, 1973^{c g}
- Prepops simplex (Kuhlgatz, 1902)^{c g}
- Prepops stricturalis (Reuter, 1910)^{c g}
- Prepops subandinus Carvalho and Wallerstein, 1978^{c g}
- Prepops subannulatus (Stål, 1860)^{c g}
- Prepops subsimilis (Reuter, 1907)^{c g}
- Prepops teapensis (Distant, 1893)^{c g}
- Prepops teutonianus Carvalho and Fontes, 1969^{c g}
- Prepops teutoniensis Carvalho, 1993^{c g}
- Prepops thoracicus (Distant, 1883)^{c g}
- Prepops tingoensis Carvalho, 1988^{c g}
- Prepops tiquiensis Carvalho, 1988^{c g}
- Prepops trilineatus Carvalho and Fontes, 1970^{c g}
- Prepops tristicolor (Reuter, 1910)^{c g}
- Prepops trivittatus Carvalho and Fontes, 1969^{c g}
- Prepops trujilloi (Distant, 1893)^{c g}
- Prepops tucumanensis Carvalho and Fontes, 1969^{c g}
- Prepops tupianus Carvalho and Fontes, 1970^{c g}
- Prepops turrialbanus Carvalho and Schaffner, 1974^{c g}
- Prepops ubirajarai Carvalho, 1989^{c g}
- Prepops univittatoides Carvalho and Fontes, 1970^{c g}
- Prepops univittatus (Berg, 1878)^{c g}
- Prepops uruguayensis (Berg, 1883)^{c g}
- Prepops variabilis Carvalho and Fontes, 1970^{c g}
- Prepops vianai Carvalho and Fontes, 1970^{c g}
- Prepops vissosensis Carvalho, 1988^{c g}
- Prepops vittatus Carvalho and Schaffner, 1987^{c g}
- Prepops vitticollis (Reuter, 1910)^{c g}
- Prepops vittifrons (Stål, 1862)^{c g}
- Prepops wallersteini Carvalho and Fontes, 1970^{c g}
- Prepops wanderbilti Carvalho, 1988^{c g}
- Prepops xavantinoides Carvalho and Fontes, 1972^{c g}
- Prepops xavantinus Carvalho and Fontes, 1969^{c g}
- Prepops zetterstedti (Stål, 1860)^{c g}
- Prepops zonatus (Knight, 1926)^{i c g}

Data sources: i = ITIS, c = Catalogue of Life, g = GBIF, b = Bugguide.net
