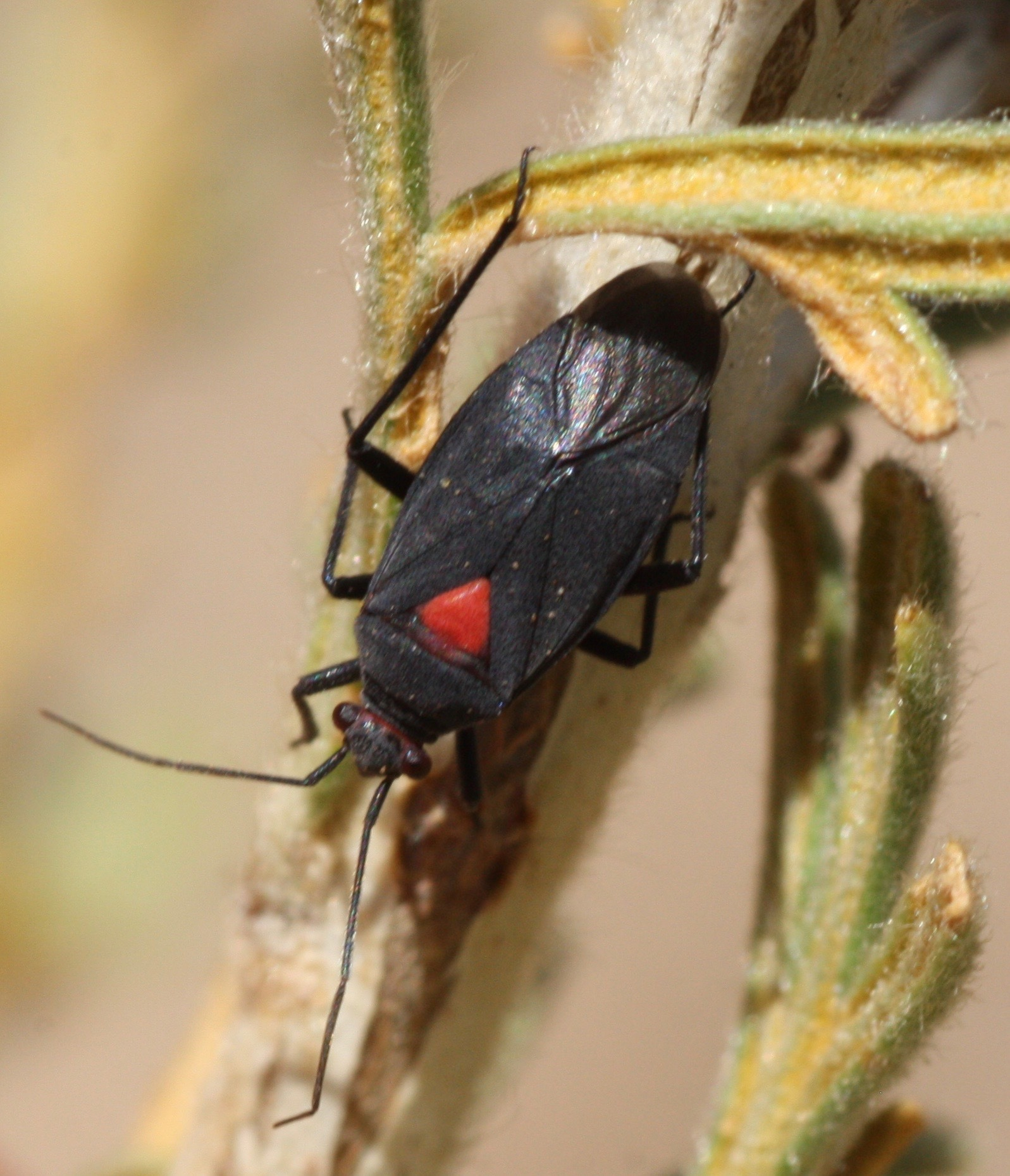

Scientific classification
- Kingdom: Animalia
- Phylum: Arthropoda
- Class: Insecta
- Order: Hemiptera
- Suborder: Heteroptera
- Family: Miridae
- Tribe: Restheniini
- Genus: Prepops
- Species: P. rubroscutellatus

Binomial name
- Prepops rubroscutellatus (Knight, 1929)

= Prepops rubroscutellatus =

Species of true bug

Prepops rubroscutellatus is a species of plant bug in the family Miridae. It is found in North America.

== Subspecies ==
These two subspecies belong to the species Prepops rubroscutellatus:

- Prepops rubroscutellatus nigriscutis (Knight, 1929)
- Prepops rubroscutellatus rubroscutellatus (Knight, 1929)
