= Prepops nigripilus =

Scientific classification
- Kingdom: Animalia
- Phylum: Arthropoda
- Class: Insecta
- Order: Hemiptera
- Suborder: Heteroptera
- Family: Miridae
- Tribe: Restheniini
- Genus: Prepops
- Species: P. nigripilus

Binomial name
- Prepops nigripilus (Knight, 1929)

Species of true bug

Prepops nigripilus is a species of plant bug in the family Miridae. It is found in North America.
