= Prepops fraternus =

Scientific classification
- Kingdom: Animalia
- Phylum: Arthropoda
- Class: Insecta
- Order: Hemiptera
- Suborder: Heteroptera
- Family: Miridae
- Tribe: Restheniini
- Genus: Prepops
- Species: P. fraternus

Binomial name
- Prepops fraternus (Knight, 1923)

Species of true bug

Prepops fraternus is a species of plant bug in the family Miridae. It is found in North America. It is normally found on sumac.

== Subspecies ==
These four subspecies belong to the species Prepops fraternus:

- Prepops fraternus discifer (Knight, 1923)
- Prepops fraternus fraternus (Knight, 1923)
- Prepops fraternus regalis (Knight, 1923)
- Prepops fraternus rubromarginatus (Knight, 1923)
