= Prepops bivittis =

Scientific classification
- Kingdom: Animalia
- Phylum: Arthropoda
- Clade: Pancrustacea
- Class: Insecta
- Order: Hemiptera
- Suborder: Heteroptera
- Family: Miridae
- Tribe: Restheniini
- Genus: Prepops
- Species: P. bivittis

Binomial name
- Prepops bivittis (Stål, 1862)

Species of true bug

Prepops bivittis is a species of plant bug in the family Miridae. It is found in Central America and North America.

== Subspecies ==
These two subspecies belong to the species Prepops bivittis:

- Prepops bivittis bivittis (Stål, 1862)
- Prepops bivittis evittatus (Knight, 1929)
