= Prepops borealis =

Scientific classification
- Kingdom: Animalia
- Phylum: Arthropoda
- Class: Insecta
- Order: Hemiptera
- Suborder: Heteroptera
- Family: Miridae
- Tribe: Restheniini
- Genus: Prepops
- Species: P. borealis

Binomial name
- Prepops borealis (Knight, 1923)

Species of true bug

Prepops borealis is a species of plant bug in the family Miridae. It is found in North America.

== Subspecies ==
These two subspecies belong to the species Prepops borealis:

- Prepops borealis borealis (Knight, 1923)
- Prepops borealis notatus (Knight, 1929)
