= Creontiades debilis =

Scientific classification
- Kingdom: Animalia
- Phylum: Arthropoda
- Class: Insecta
- Order: Hemiptera
- Suborder: Heteroptera
- Family: Miridae
- Tribe: Mirini
- Genus: Creontiades
- Species: C. debilis

Binomial name
- Creontiades debilis Van Duzee, 1915

Species of true bug

Creontiades debilis is a species of plant bug in the family Miridae. It is found in the Caribbean Sea and North America.
