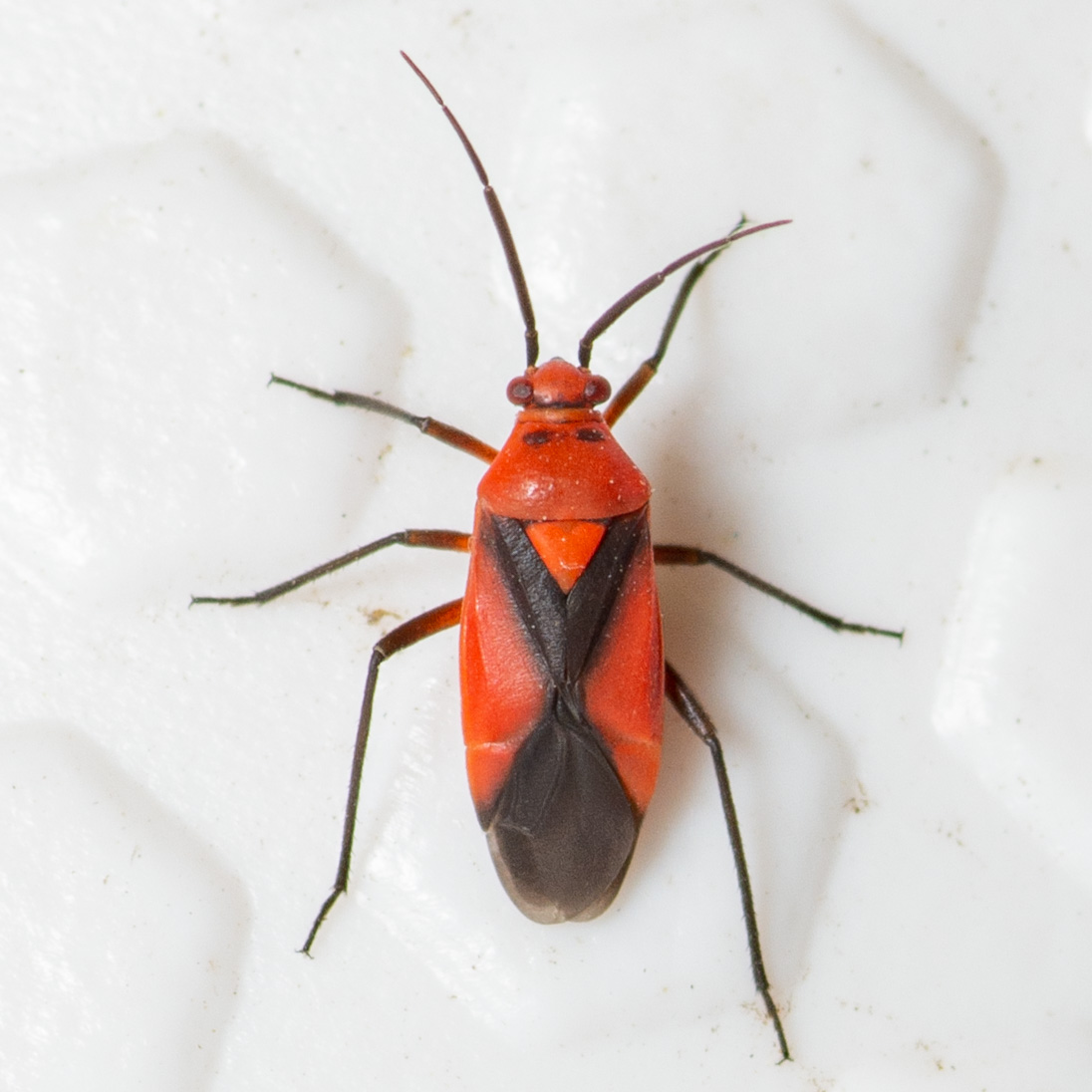

Scientific classification
- Kingdom: Animalia
- Phylum: Arthropoda
- Class: Insecta
- Order: Hemiptera
- Suborder: Heteroptera
- Family: Miridae
- Genus: Oncerometopus
- Species: O. nigriclavus

Binomial name
- Oncerometopus nigriclavus Reuter, 1876

= Oncerometopus nigriclavus =

Species of true bug

Oncerometopus nigriclavus is a species of plant bug in the family Miridae. It is found in Central America and North America.
