= Corticoris =

Scientific classification
- Kingdom: Animalia
- Phylum: Arthropoda
- Clade: Pancrustacea
- Class: Insecta
- Order: Hemiptera
- Suborder: Heteroptera
- Family: Miridae
- Subfamily: Isometopinae
- Genus: Corticoris; McAtee & Malloch, 1922

Genus of true bugs

Corticoris is a genus of jumping tree bugs in the family of Miridae. There are about nine described species in Corticoris.

== Species ==
These nine species belong to the genus of Corticoris:

- Corticoris infuscatus Henry & Herring, 1979
- Corticoris libertus (Gibson, 1917)
- Corticoris mexicanus Henry & Herring, 1979
- Corticoris pallidus T.Henry, 1984
- Corticoris pintoi T.Henry, 1984
- Corticoris pubescens T.Henry, 1984
- Corticoris pulchellus (Heidemann, 1908)
- Corticoris signatus (Heidemann, 1908)
- Corticoris unicolor (Heidemann, 1908)
