= Stenotus =

Stenotus may refer to:

- Stenotus (bug), a bug genus in the family Miridae
- Stenotus (plant), a plant genus in the family Asteraceae
