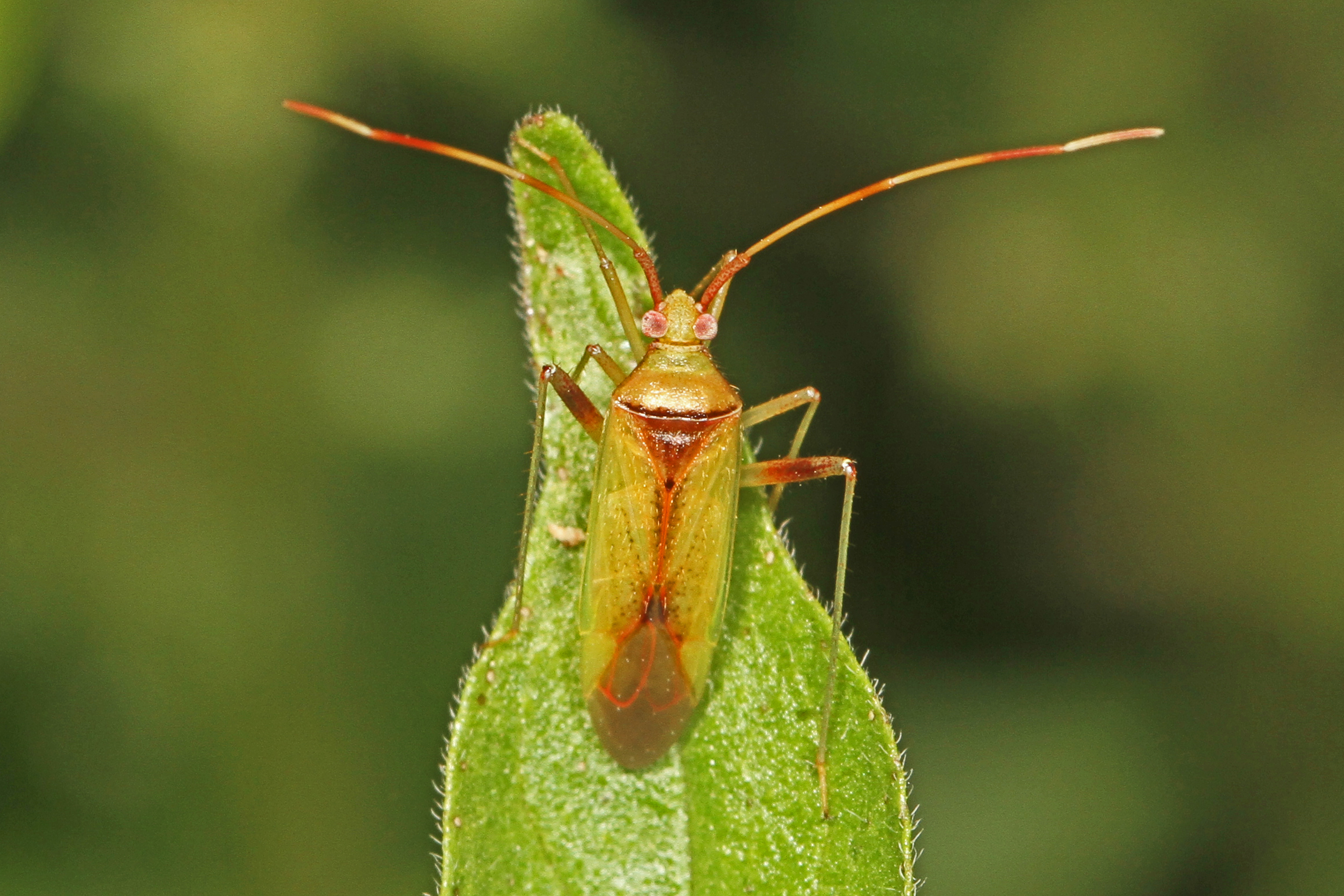

Scientific classification
- Kingdom: Animalia
- Phylum: Arthropoda
- Clade: Pancrustacea
- Class: Insecta
- Order: Hemiptera
- Suborder: Heteroptera
- Family: Miridae
- Tribe: Mirini
- Genus: Creontiades
- Species: C. rubrinervis

Binomial name
- Creontiades rubrinervis (Stål, 1862)

Synonyms
- Megacoelum rubrinerve Stål, 1862

= Creontiades rubrinervis =

Species of true bug

Creontiades rubrinervis is a species of plant bug in the family Miridae. It is found in Central America, North America, and South America.
