= Lidopus heidemanni =

Scientific classification
- Domain: Eukaryota
- Kingdom: Animalia
- Phylum: Arthropoda
- Class: Insecta
- Order: Hemiptera
- Suborder: Heteroptera
- Family: Miridae
- Genus: Lidopus
- Species: L. heidemanni

Binomial name
- Lidopus heidemanni Gibson, 1917

Species of true bug

Lidopus heidemanni is a species of jumping tree bug in the family Miridae. It is found in Central America and North America.
