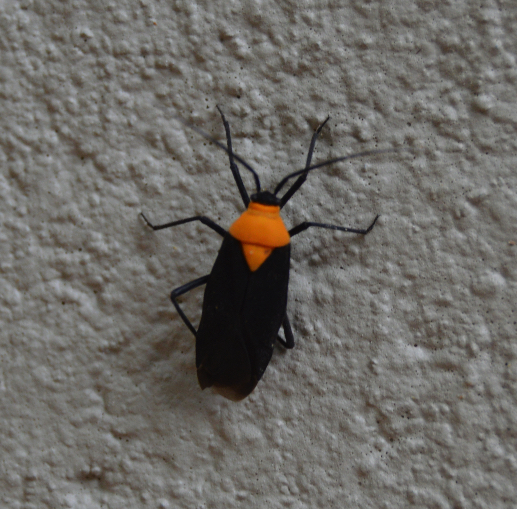

Scientific classification
- Kingdom: Animalia
- Phylum: Arthropoda
- Class: Insecta
- Order: Hemiptera
- Suborder: Heteroptera
- Family: Miridae
- Genus: Prepops
- Species: P. insitivus

Binomial name
- Prepops insitivus (Say, 1832)

= Prepops insitivus =

Species of true bug

Prepops insitivus is a species of plant bug in the family Miridae. It is found in North America.

== Subspecies ==
These two subspecies belong to the species Prepops insitivus:

- Prepops insitivus angusticollis (Knight, 1923)
- Prepops insitivus insitivus (Say, 1832)
