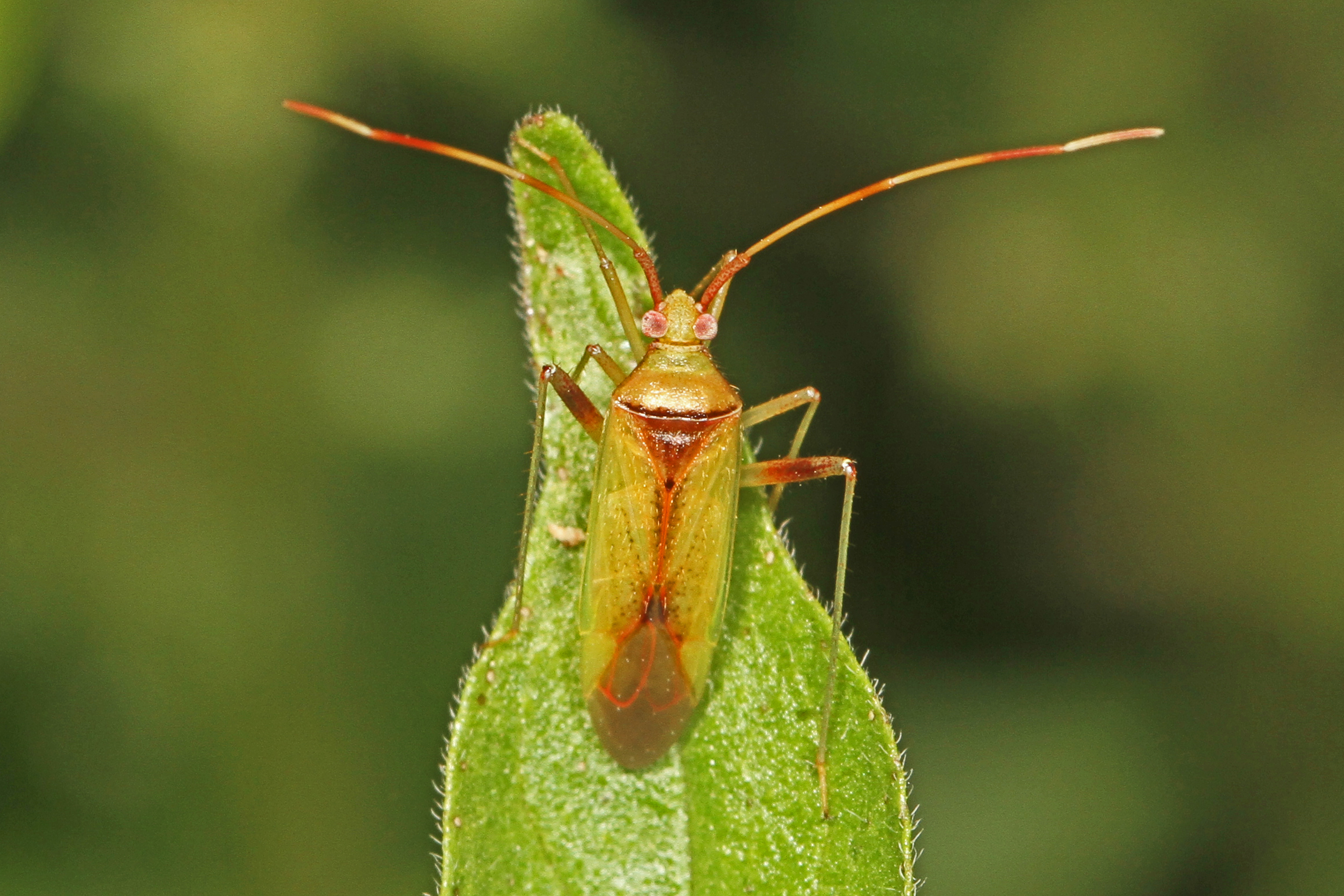
- Creontiades rubrinervis

Scientific classification
- Kingdom: Animalia
- Phylum: Arthropoda
- Clade: Pancrustacea
- Class: Insecta
- Order: Hemiptera
- Suborder: Heteroptera
- Family: Miridae
- Subfamily: Mirinae
- Tribe: Mirini
- Genus: Creontiades; Distant, 1883

= Creontiades =

Genus of true bugs

Creontiades is a genus of plant bugs in the family Miridae. There are more than 50 described species in Creontiades.

== Species ==
These 55 species belong to the genus Creontiades:

- Creontiades angulifer (Walker, 1873)
- Creontiades ater Poppius, 1915
- Creontiades bipunctatus Poppius, 1915
- Creontiades bouvieri Poppius, 1912
- Creontiades brevis Yasunaga, 1997
- Creontiades brunneus Poppius, 1914
- Creontiades castaneum Van Duzee, 1933
- Creontiades citrinus Carvalho, 1968
- Creontiades coloratus Poppius, 1912
- Creontiades coloripes Hsiao & Meng, 1963
- Creontiades debilis Van Duzee, 1915
- Creontiades dilutus (Stal, 1859)
- Creontiades elongatus (Lethierry, 1881)
- Creontiades erlangeri Poppius, 1912
- Creontiades fernandinus Carvalho, 1968
- Creontiades fruhstorferi Poppius, 1915
- Creontiades fuscosus Barber, 1925
- Creontiades grandis (Poppius, 1912)
- Creontiades hildebrandti Poppius, 1912
- Creontiades hirsutus (Poppius, 1910)
- Creontiades insularis Poppius, 1911
- Creontiades longicornis Poppius, 1912
- Creontiades maculicollis Poppius, 1915
- Creontiades marginatus Poppius, 1915
- Creontiades minutus Poppius, 1915
- Creontiades modiglianii Poppius, 1915
- Creontiades montanus Poppius, 1915
- Creontiades neavei Poppius, 1914
- Creontiades novaeguineae Poppius, 1915
- Creontiades orientalis Poppius, 1915
- Creontiades pacificus (Stal, 1859)
- Creontiades palauensis Carvalho, 1956
- Creontiades pallidus (Rambur, 1839)
- Creontiades philippinensis Yasunaga, 1998
- Creontiades plebejus Poppius, 1912
- Creontiades pulchricornis Poppius, 1912
- Creontiades punctatus Carvalho, 1968
- Creontiades purgatus (Stål, 1860)
- Creontiades ravana (Kirkaldy, 1909)
- Creontiades rubrinervis (Stål, 1862)
- Creontiades rugicollis Poppius, 1914
- Creontiades rusticus Poppius, 1912
- Creontiades samoanus Knight, 1935
- Creontiades signatus (Distant, 1884) (verde plant bug)
- Creontiades simillimus Poppius, 1912
- Creontiades subpellucidus Poppius, 1912
- Creontiades sumatrensis Poppius, 1915
- Creontiades suturalis (Poppius, 1910)
- Creontiades tellinii (Reuter, 1905)
- Creontiades uzeli Poppius, 1911
- Creontiades vittatus Carvalho, 1968
- Creontiades vitticollis Poppius, 1915
- Creontiades vittipennis Reuter, 1905
- Creontiades willowsi Van Duzee, 1933
- Creontiades yapensis Carvalho, 1956
