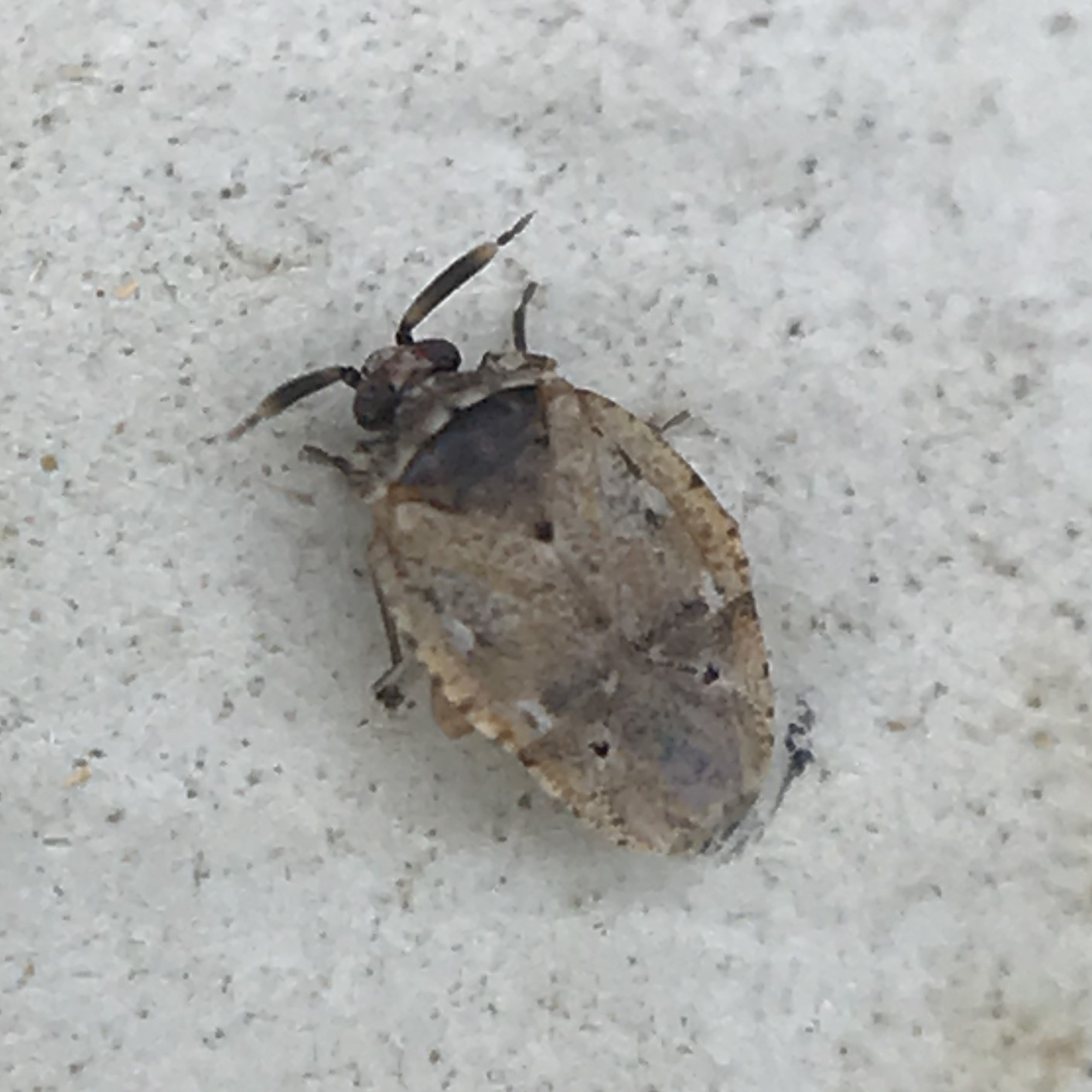
- Diphleps unica

Scientific classification
- Kingdom: Animalia
- Phylum: Arthropoda
- Clade: Pancrustacea
- Class: Insecta
- Order: Hemiptera
- Suborder: Heteroptera
- Family: Miridae
- Subfamily: Isometopinae
- Genus: Diphleps; Bergroth, 1924

= Diphleps =

Genus of true bugs

Diphleps is a genus of jumping tree bugs in the family Miridae. There are about five described species in Diphleps.

== Species ==
These five species belong to the genus Diphleps:

- Diphleps henryi Hernandez, 1998
- Diphleps maldonadoi T.Henry, 1977
- Diphleps similaris T.Henry, 1977
- Diphleps unica Bergroth, 1924
- Diphleps yenli Santiago-Blay & Poinar, 1993
