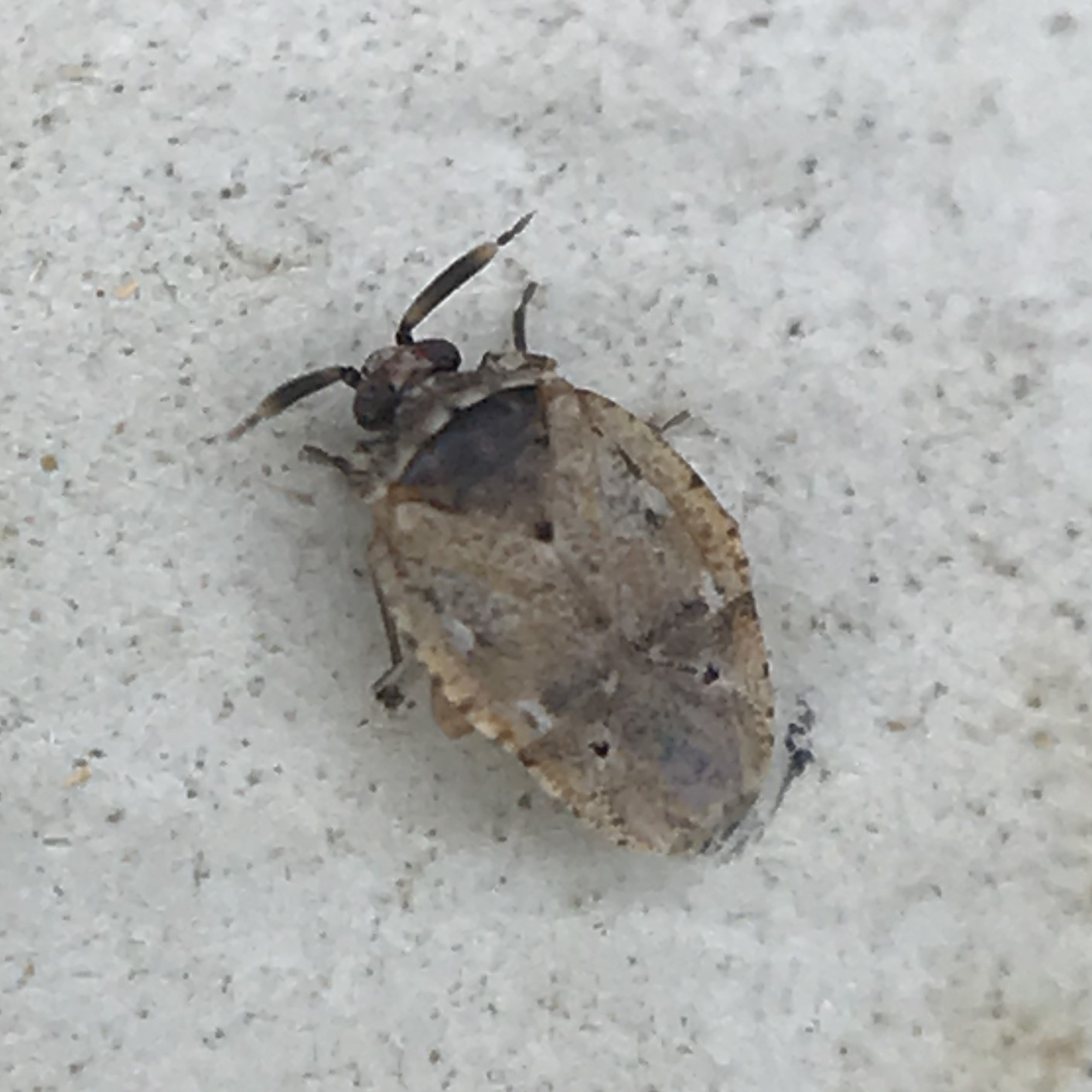

Scientific classification
- Domain: Eukaryota
- Kingdom: Animalia
- Phylum: Arthropoda
- Class: Insecta
- Order: Hemiptera
- Suborder: Heteroptera
- Family: Miridae
- Genus: Diphleps
- Species: D. unica

Binomial name
- Diphleps unica Bergroth, 1924

= Diphleps unica =

Species of true bug

Diphleps unica is a species of jumping tree bug in the family Miridae. It is found in North America.
