= Corticoris signatus =

Scientific classification
- Domain: Eukaryota
- Kingdom: Animalia
- Phylum: Arthropoda
- Class: Insecta
- Order: Hemiptera
- Suborder: Heteroptera
- Family: Miridae
- Genus: Corticoris
- Species: C. signatus

Binomial name
- Corticoris signatus (Heidemann, 1908)

Species of true bug

Corticoris signatus is a species of jumping tree bug in the family Miridae. It is found in North America.
