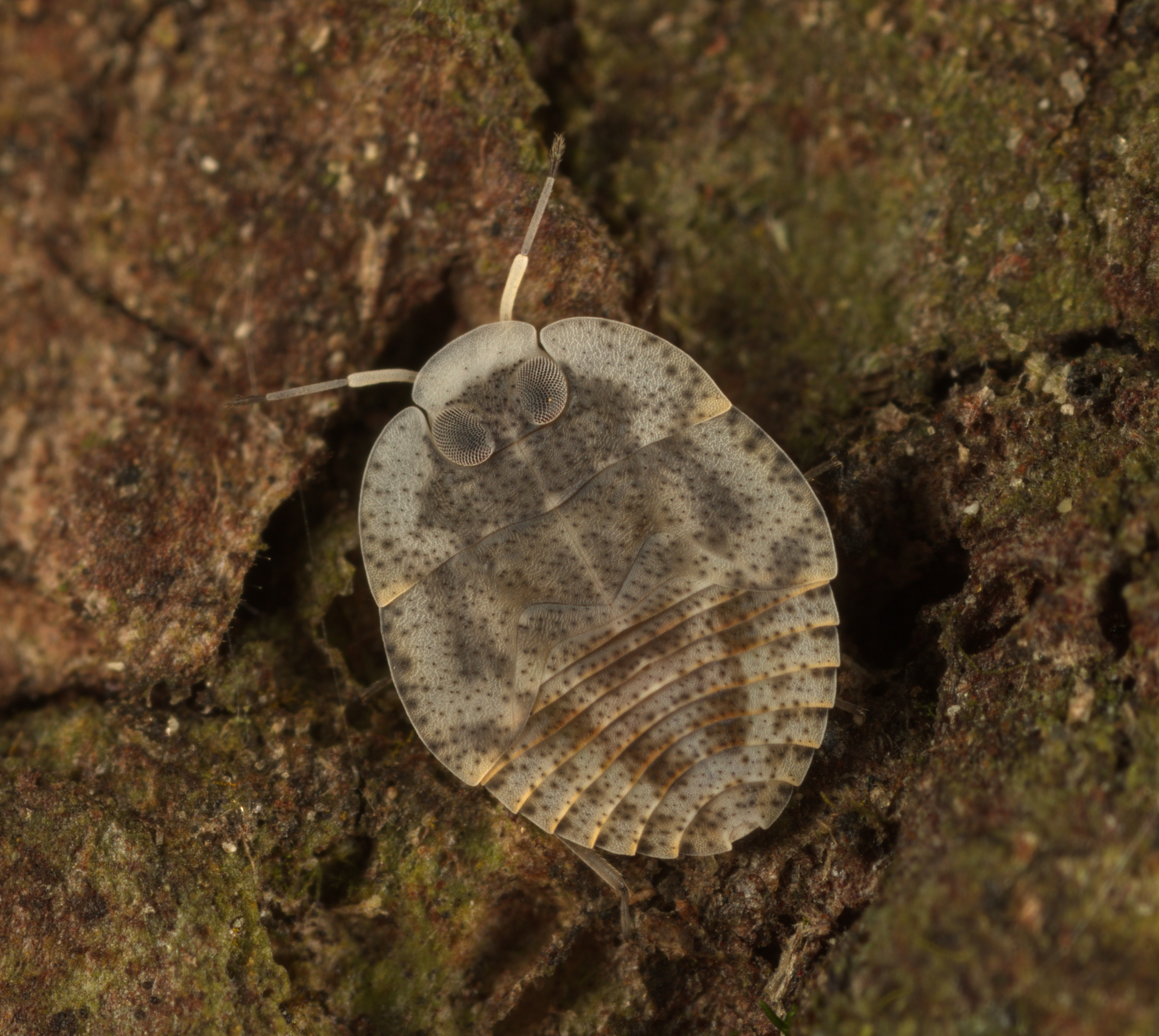

Scientific classification
- Domain: Eukaryota
- Kingdom: Animalia
- Phylum: Arthropoda
- Class: Insecta
- Order: Hemiptera
- Suborder: Heteroptera
- Family: Miridae
- Subfamily: Isometopinae; Fieber, 1860

= Isometopinae =

Subfamily of true bugs

Isometopinae is a subfamily of jumping tree bugs in the family Miridae and are the only members of the Miridae to possess ocelli. The subfamily is split into five tribes. There are 42 genera and approximately 239 described species in Isometopinae.

== Genera ==
These six genera belong to the subfamily Isometopinae:

- Corticoris McAtee & Malloch, 1922
- Diphleps Bergroth, 1924
- Lidopus Gibson, 1917
- Myiomma Puton, 1872
- Wetmorea McAtee and Malloch, 1924
- Myiopus Henry 1980
