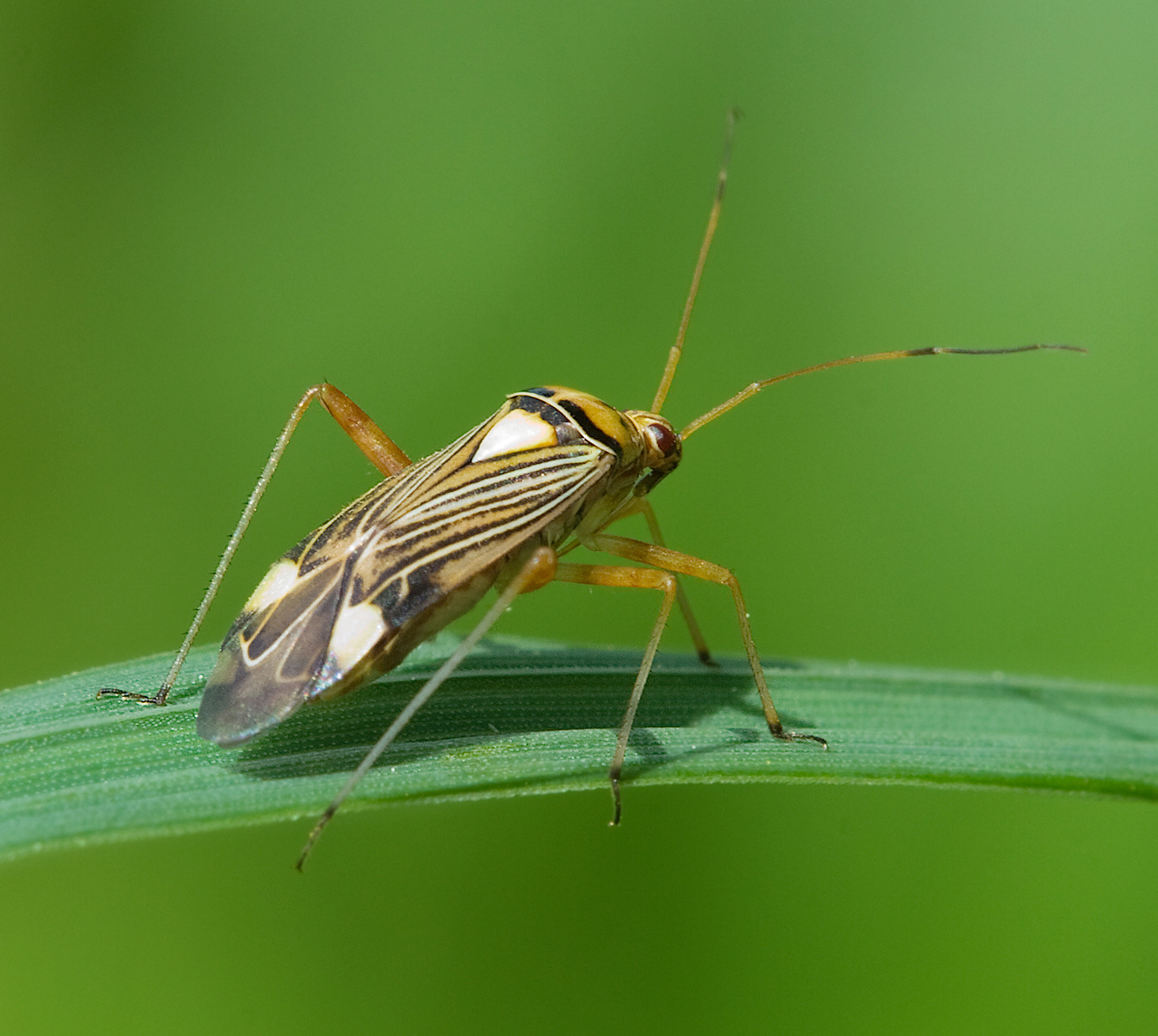
- Rhabdomiris striatellus

Scientific classification
- Domain: Eukaryota
- Kingdom: Animalia
- Phylum: Arthropoda
- Class: Insecta
- Order: Hemiptera
- Suborder: Heteroptera
- Family: Miridae
- Genus: Rhabdomiris; Wagner, 1968

= Rhabdomiris =

Genus of true bugs

Rhabdomiris is a genus of true bugs belonging to the family Miridae.

The species of this genus are found in Europe and Far Eastern Russia.

Species:

- Rhabdomiris pulcherrimus (Lindberg, 1934)
- Rhabdomiris striatellus (Fabricius, 1794)
