= Prepops circumcinctus =

Scientific classification
- Kingdom: Animalia
- Phylum: Arthropoda
- Class: Insecta
- Order: Hemiptera
- Suborder: Heteroptera
- Family: Miridae
- Genus: Prepops
- Species: P. circumcinctus

Binomial name
- Prepops circumcinctus (Say, 1832)

Species of true bug

Prepops circumcinctus is a species of plant bug in the family Miridae. It is found in Central America and North America.
