= Oncerometopus =

Scientific classification
- Kingdom: Animalia
- Phylum: Arthropoda
- Class: Insecta
- Order: Hemiptera
- Suborder: Heteroptera
- Family: Miridae
- Tribe: Restheniini
- Genus: Oncerometopus; Reuter, 1876

Genus of true bugs

Oncerometopus is a genus of plant bugs in the family Miridae. There are about 12 described species in Oncerometopus.

== Species ==
These 12 species belong to the genus Oncerometopus:

- Oncerometopus atriscutis Knight, 1928
- Oncerometopus californica Van Duzee, 1918
- Oncerometopus californicus Van Duzee, 1918
- Oncerometopus impictus Knight, 1928
- Oncerometopus mexicanus Carvalho and Schaffner, 1987
- Oncerometopus nasutus Knight, 1928
- Oncerometopus nicholi Knight, 1928
- Oncerometopus nigriclavus Reuter, 1876
- Oncerometopus nitens Knight, 1928
- Oncerometopus pueblensis Carvalho, 1988
- Oncerometopus rectanguliferus Reuter, 1908
- Oncerometopus ruber Reuter, 1876
