= Creontiades pallidus =

Scientific classification
- Kingdom: Animalia
- Phylum: Arthropoda
- Class: Insecta
- Order: Hemiptera
- Suborder: Heteroptera
- Family: Miridae
- Genus: Creontiades
- Species: C. pallidus

Binomial name
- Creontiades pallidus (Rambur, 1839)

Species of true bug

Creontiades pallidus is a species of true bug in the family Miridae. It is a serious pest of cotton and sorghum in Africa.
