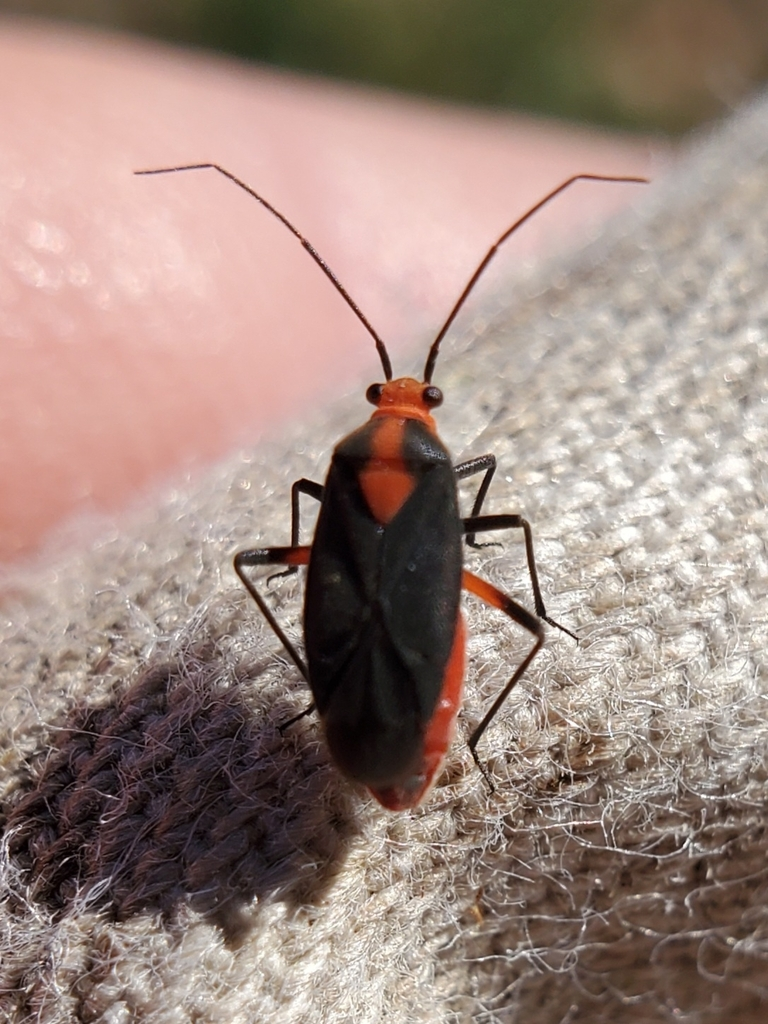

Scientific classification
- Kingdom: Animalia
- Phylum: Arthropoda
- Clade: Pancrustacea
- Class: Insecta
- Order: Hemiptera
- Suborder: Heteroptera
- Family: Miridae
- Genus: Prepops
- Species: P. rubrovittatus

Binomial name
- Prepops rubrovittatus (Stål, 1862)

= Prepops rubrovittatus =

Species of true bug

Prepops rubrovittatus is a species of plant bug in the family Miridae. It is found in Central America and North America.
