= Creontiades signatus =

Scientific classification
- Kingdom: Animalia
- Phylum: Arthropoda
- Class: Insecta
- Order: Hemiptera
- Suborder: Heteroptera
- Family: Miridae
- Genus: Creontiades
- Species: C. signatus

Binomial name
- Creontiades signatus (Distant, 1884)

Species of true bug

Creontiades signatus, the verde plant bug, is a species of plant bug in the family Miridae. It is found in Central America and North America.
