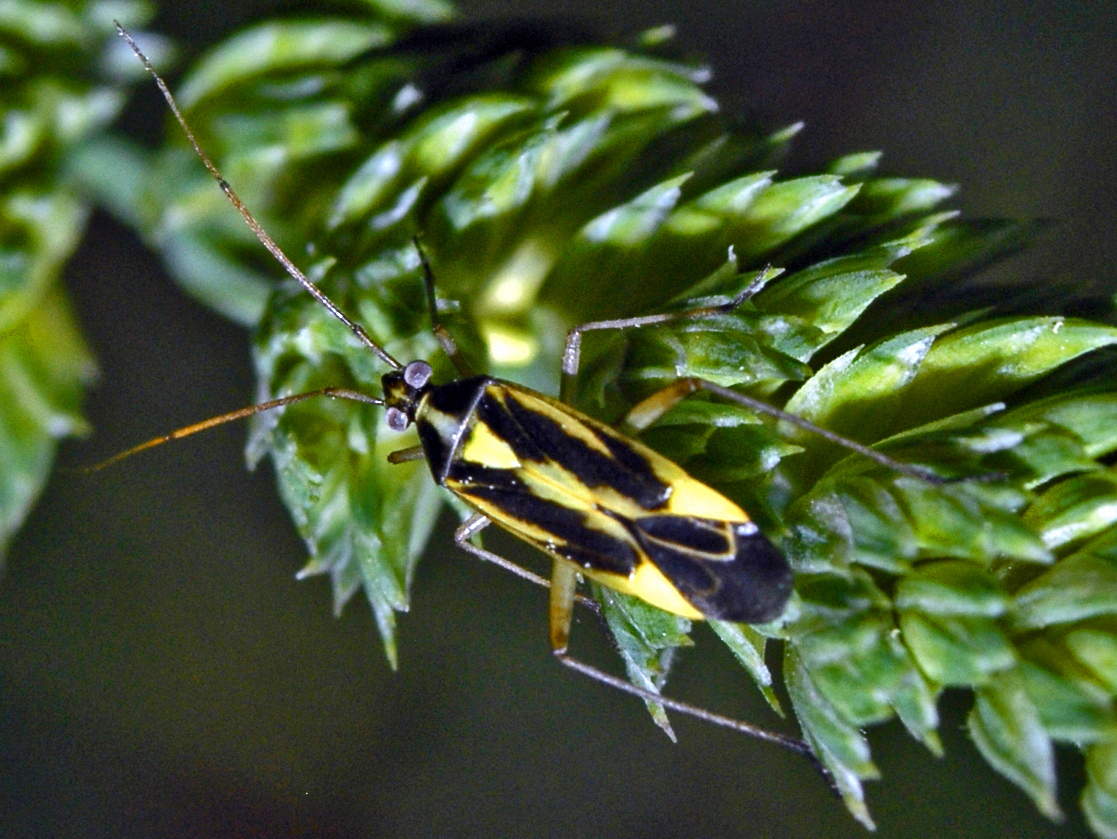
- Male
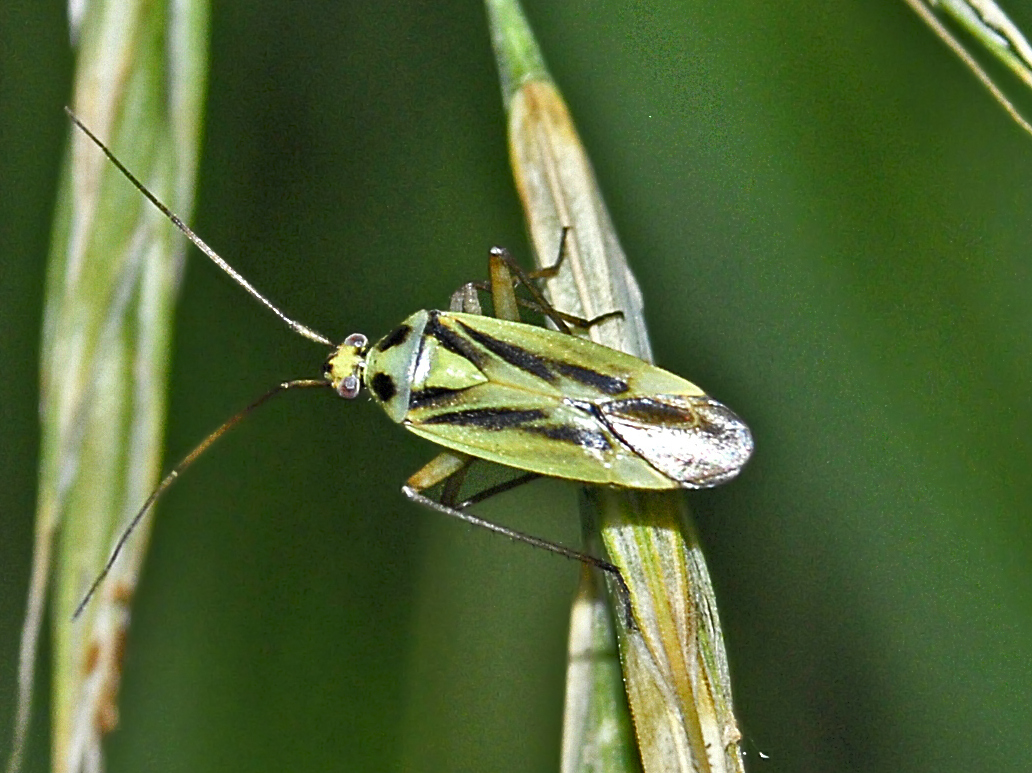
- Female

Scientific classification
- Kingdom: Animalia
- Phylum: Arthropoda
- Class: Insecta
- Order: Hemiptera
- Suborder: Heteroptera
- Family: Miridae
- Genus: Stenotus (bug)
- Species: S. binotatus

Binomial name
- Stenotus binotatus (Fabricius, 1794)

Synonyms
- Lygaeus binotatus Fabricius, 1794; Cimex paykulli Turton, 1802; Stenotus sareptanus Jakovlev, 1877

= Stenotus binotatus =

Species of true bug

Stenotus binotatus is a species of plant bug, originally from Europe, but now also established across North America and New Zealand. It is 6–7 mm (0.24–0.28 in) long, yellowish, with darker markings on the pronotum and forewings. It feeds on various grasses, and can be a pest of crops such as wheat.

== Description ==
Stenotus binotatus is a fairly large plant bug (6–7 millimetres or 0.24–0.28 inches long), which is somewhat variable in appearance. The insect's sides are roughly parallel, and the colours depend on both the animal's sex and its age, the markings becoming darker and stronger with increasing age. Males are mostly yellow, with darker markings on the pronotum and forewings, which females are greenish-yellow with paler markings.

== Distribution ==
S. binotatus is native to most of the Palearctic but has been introduced to temperate regions around the world. It is common "throughout the northern and central U.S. and southern Canada", and it has been introduced to New Zealand, where it is now found almost throughout the country.

== Ecology ==
Both the nymphs and adults feed on the inflorescences of grasses, especially timothy-grass (Phleum pratense). In New Zealand, S. binotatus has been collected from a large variety of plants, including the grasses brown top, Yorkshire fog, cocksfoot, wheat, barley and maize, and many other plants (including rushes, Hypericum, Leptospermum scoparium, Metrosideros, Nothofagus, Coriaria, Olearia, Muehlenbeckia, Carmichaelia, Larix decidua, Eucalyptus, Melicytus ramiflorus, Coprosma robusta, hemlock and nettles).

Adults are active from June to September in the United Kingdom, and in December and January in New Zealand.

== Crop damage ==
Stenotus binotatus produces an enzyme which degrades the gluten in the grasses it feeds on. These enzymes are believed to be responsible for the characteristic "sticky dough" produced from wheat which has been attacked by plant bugs such as S. binotatus.

The wheat grain does not show a pale area or puncture mark after attack by S. binotatus, in contrast to other bugs. Instead, the grains appear collapsed. Wheat grains from known bug infestation in New Zealand do not resemble those produced by S. binotatus, and SDS-PAGE patterns also suggest that S. binotatus was not the cause of infestations.

== Taxonomic history ==
Stenotus binotatus was originally described under the name Lygaeus binotatus by Johan Christian Fabricius in 1794. The genus Stenotus was erected by Wassily Ewgrafowitsch Jakowlew (also transcribed as "Jakovlev") in 1877, and S. binotatus was designated its type species.

Stenotus binotatus is known by various common names, including two-spotted plant bug, timothy plant bug, and slender crop mirid.
