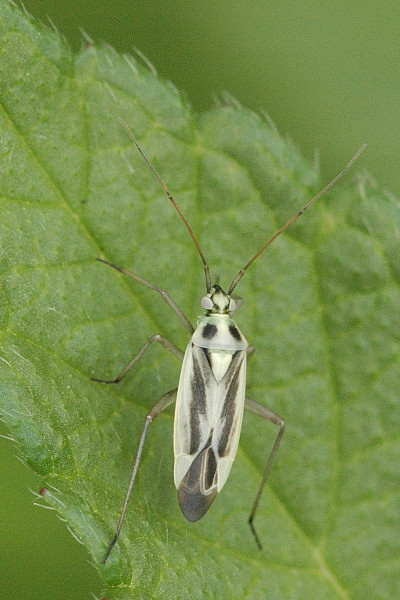
- Stenotus binotatus

Scientific classification
- Kingdom: Animalia
- Phylum: Arthropoda
- Class: Insecta
- Order: Hemiptera
- Suborder: Heteroptera
- Family: Miridae
- Subfamily: Mirinae
- Tribe: Mirini
- Genus: Stenotus (bug); Jakovlev, 1877

Type species
- Stenotus binotatus (Fabricius, 1794)

= Stenotus (bug) =

Genus of true bugs

Stenotus is a genus of plant bugs (family Miridae), containing the following species:

- Stenotus aureus Linnavuori, 1975
- Stenotus binotatus (Fabricius, 1794)
- Stenotus bipunctatus Poppius, 1911
- Stenotus bivittatus Poppius, 1915
- Stenotus brauni Poppius, 1912
- Stenotus brevicollis Poppius, 1915
- Stenotus brevior Poppius, 1910
- Stenotus capensis Poppius, 1912
- Stenotus caucasicus Akramovskaya & Kerzhner, 1978
- Stenotus chryseis Linnavuori, 1974
- Stenotus clypealis Poppius, 1915
- Stenotus distinctus Reuter, 1905
- Stenotus elegans Poppius, 1912
- Stenotus fasciaticollis Reuter, 1905
- Stenotus fulvus Poppius, 1912
- Stenotus gestroi Poppius, 1912
- Stenotus hathor (Kirkaldy, 1902)
- Stenotus insularis Poppius, 1915
- Stenotus klepsydra Linnavuori, 1974
- Stenotus lindiensis Poppius, 1912
- Stenotus lineaticollis Poppius, 1914
- Stenotus longiceps Poppius, 1915
- Stenotus longipennis Reuter, 1905
- Stenotus longulus Poppius, 1912
- Stenotus marginatus Poppius, 1914
- Stenotus niger Poppius, 1914
- Stenotus nigroquadristriatus (Kirkaldy, 1902)
- Stenotus pallidus (Reuter, 1904)
- Stenotus proitos Linnavuori, 1974
- Stenotus psole (Kirkaldy, 1902)
- Stenotus pulcher Poppius, 1912
- Stenotus pusillus Carvalho, Dutra & Becker, 1960
- Stenotus pygmaeus Poppius, 1915
- Stenotus pylaon (Kirkaldy, 1902)
- Stenotus ruber Poppius, 1912
- Stenotus rubricatum (Distant, 1904)
- Stenotus rubripedes Carvalho, 1953
- Stenotus rubrovittatus (Matsumura, 1913)
- Stenotus rufescens Poppius, 1910
- Stenotus sandaracatus (Distant, 1904)
- Stenotus stramineus Poppius, 1915
- Stenotus tesquorum Akramovskaya & Kerzhner, 1978
- Stenotus transvaalensis (Distant, 1904)
- Stenotus typicus (Distant, 1904)
- Stenotus viridis (Shiraki, 1913)
- Stenotus vitticollis Reuter, 1907
