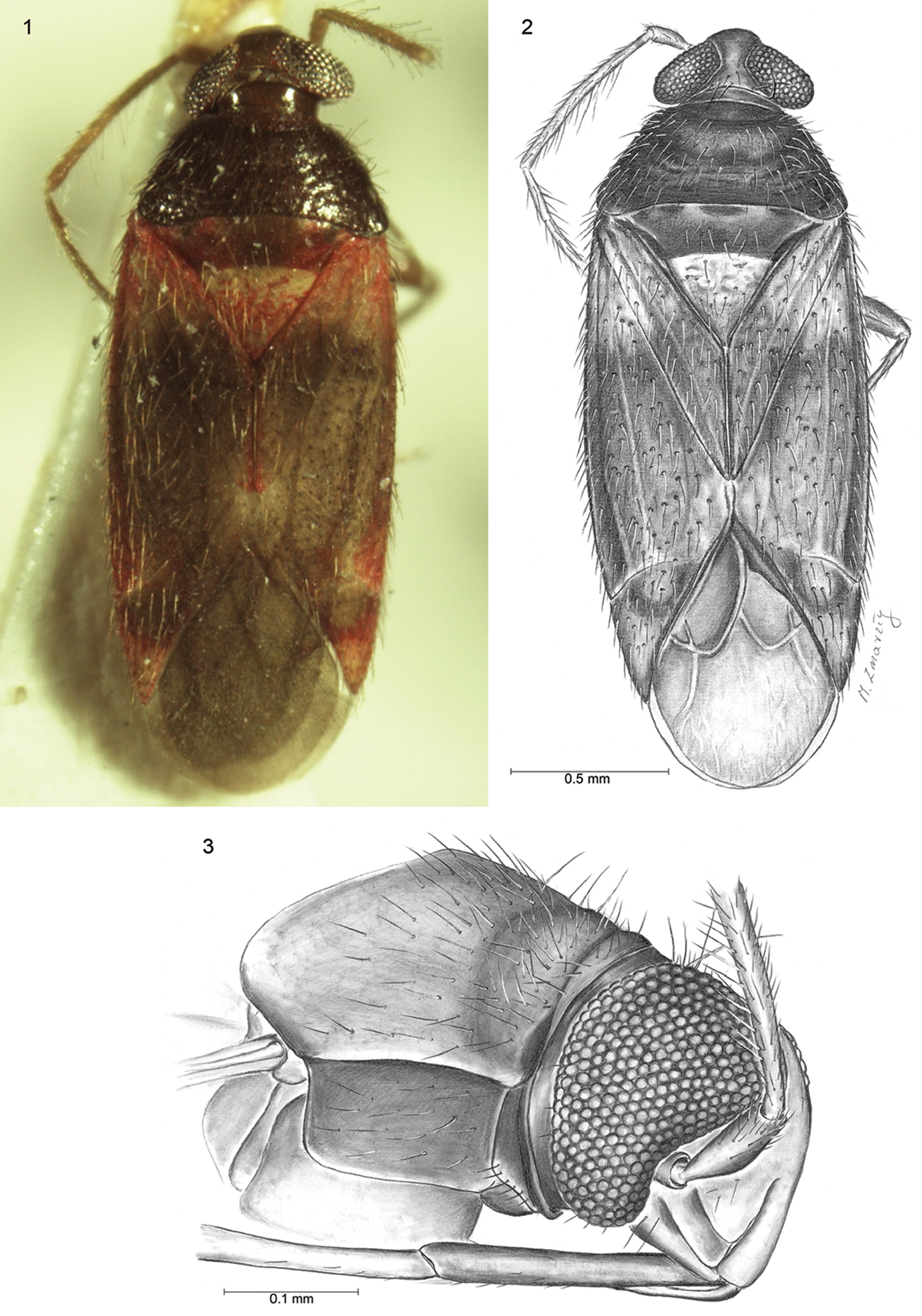
- Psallops coloratus from the Malay Peninsula

Scientific classification
- Kingdom: Animalia
- Phylum: Arthropoda
- Clade: Pancrustacea
- Class: Insecta
- Order: Hemiptera
- Suborder: Heteroptera
- Family: Miridae
- Subfamily: Psallopinae
- Genus: Psallops; Usinger, 1946

= Psallops =

Genus of true bugs

Psallops is a genus of capsid bugs typical of the subfamily Psallopinae, erected by Robert Usinger in 1946. Records of occurrence are mostly from Africa, Asia and the Pacific Islands.

== Species ==
As of 2026 the Global Biodiversity Information Facility and BioLib list:

1. Psallops bitterfeldi Herczek et al., 2015
2. Psallops chinensis C.S. Lin, 2004
3. Psallops coloratus Herczek, Popov & Gorczyca, 2017
4. Psallops cookensis Namyatova & Cassis, 2018
5. Psallops eocenicus Herczek, Popov & Gorczyca, 2015
6. Psallops formosanus C.S. Lin, 2008
7. Psallops fulvioides Yasunaga & Yamada, 2010
8. Psallops grandoculus Linnavuori & Al-Al-Né'amy, 1982
9. Psallops kalumburu Namyatova & Cassis, 2018
10. Psallops kimberley Namyatova & Cassis, 2018
11. Psallops leeae C.S. Lin, 2004
12. Psallops linnavuorii Herczek, Popov & Gorczyca, 2016
13. Psallops luteus C.S. Lin, 2006
14. Psallops myiocephalus Yasunaga, 1999
15. Psallops nakatanii Yasunaga, 1999
16. Psallops niedzwiedzkii Herczek & Popov, 2016
17. Psallops oculatus Usinger, 1946 - type species
18. Psallops ponapensis Carvalho, 1956
19. Psallops popovi Herczek, 2011
20. Psallops sakaerat Yasunaga & Yamada, 2010
21. Psallops schmitzi Herczek & Popov, 2014
22. Psallops webbi Herczek & Popov, 2014
23. Psallops webbii Herczek & Popov, 2015
24. Psallops yaeyamanus Yasunaga, 1999
25. Psallops yapensis Carvalho, 1956
