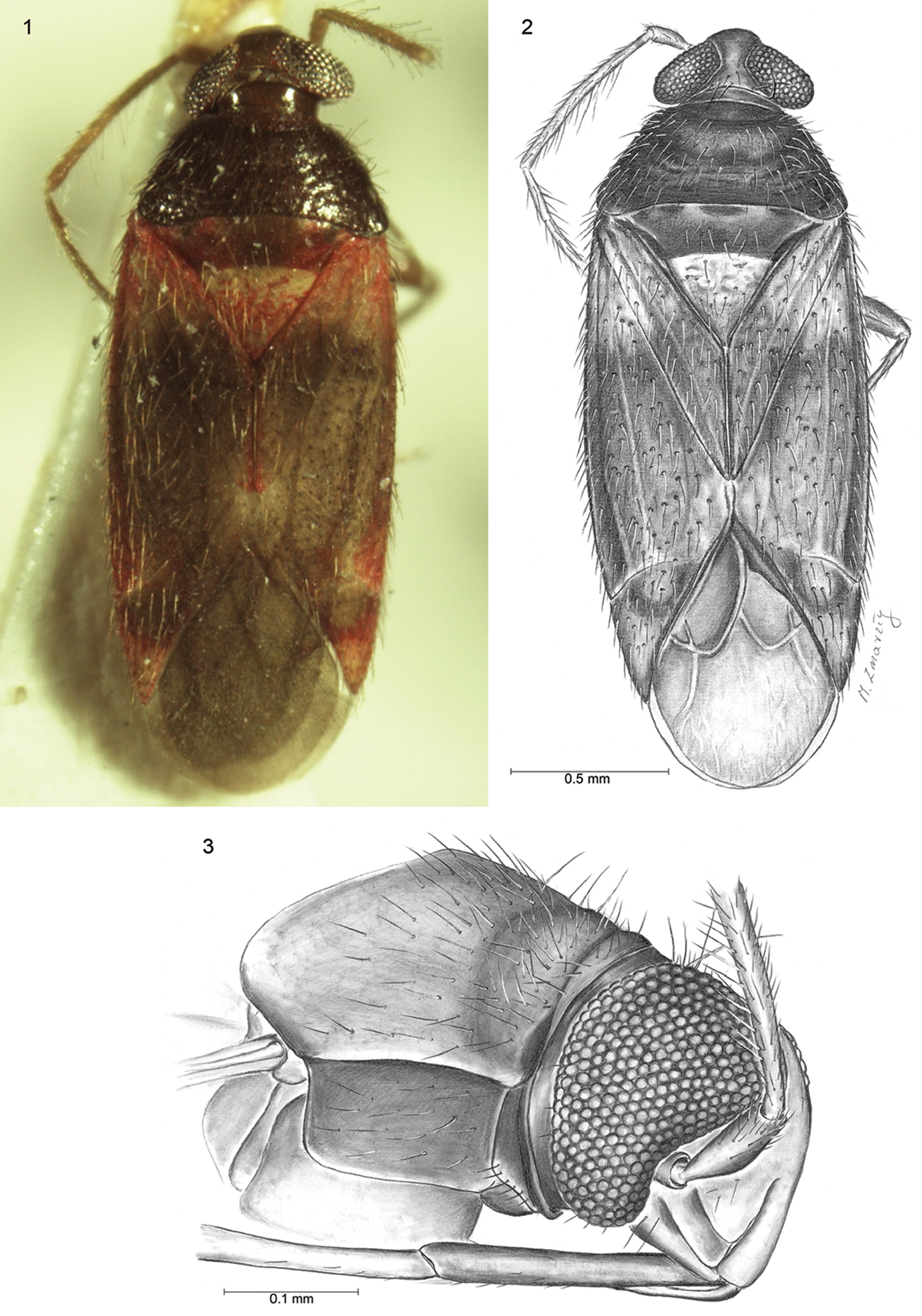
- Psallops coloratus from the Malay Peninsula

Scientific classification
- Kingdom: Animalia
- Phylum: Arthropoda
- Clade: Pancrustacea
- Class: Insecta
- Order: Hemiptera
- Suborder: Heteroptera
- Family: Miridae
- Subfamily: Psallopinae; Schuh, 1976

= Psallopinae =

Subfamily of plant bugs

Psallopinae is the smallest subfamily of plant bugs in the family Miridae.

== Distribution and systematics ==
The group is widely distributed across the Old World. Although historically there were no records of the subfamily from the Australian continent, a 2018 study by Namyatova and Cassis documented Psallopinae for the first time in Australia, describing three new species of the type genus Psallops, followed in 2022 by two Australian species in a new genus Psallofulvius.

== Genera ==
Biolib.cz includes the following extant and fossil genera in this subfamily:

1. †Cylapopsallops Popov & Herczek, 2006
2. †Epigonopsallops Herczek & Popov, 2009
3. †Isometopsallops Herczek & Popov, 1992
4. Psallofulvius Namyatova, 2022 - Australia
5. Psallops Usinger, 1946 (type genus)
