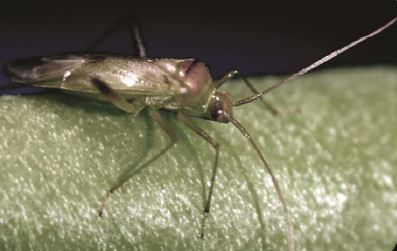
- green mirid adult

Scientific classification
- Kingdom: Animalia
- Phylum: Arthropoda
- Clade: Pancrustacea
- Class: Insecta
- Order: Hemiptera
- Suborder: Heteroptera
- Family: Miridae
- Genus: Creontiades
- Species: C. dilutus

Binomial name
- Creontiades dilutus Stål (1859)

= Creontiades dilutus =

Green mirid

Species of true bug

Creontiades dilutus, commonly known as the green mirid, is a member of the bug family Miridae (the largest bug family with over 10,000 species). This insect is considered a "generalist" feeding on over 100 plant species, and is also a major economic pest on several important agricultural crops.

== Distribution ==
The green mirid is endemic to Australia, and found throughout the continent including in Tasmania. This insect is found throughout the hot and arid interior of the continent (see figure below) and is particularly abundant in these regions during southern hemisphere winter (especially if there has been higher than average winter rain). In summer months the interior of the country is very hot and dry and there are very few plants available for green mirids to feed on, a few individuals do persist in this region during summer months but not many. In the Eastern cropping regions the winter months are too cold to support growth and development of green mirids, some do survive through the winter in these regions, but again in very low numbers. In the summer conditions in the Eastern cropping regions are ideal for mirid growth and development and large populations van build up rapidly. Anecdotal evidence indicates that mirids will often appear in large numbers in cropping regions associated with storm fronts or weather events that originated in the inland areas. Genetic evidence supports this anecdotal evidence and shows that inland populations and coastal populations of these insects are genetically connected.

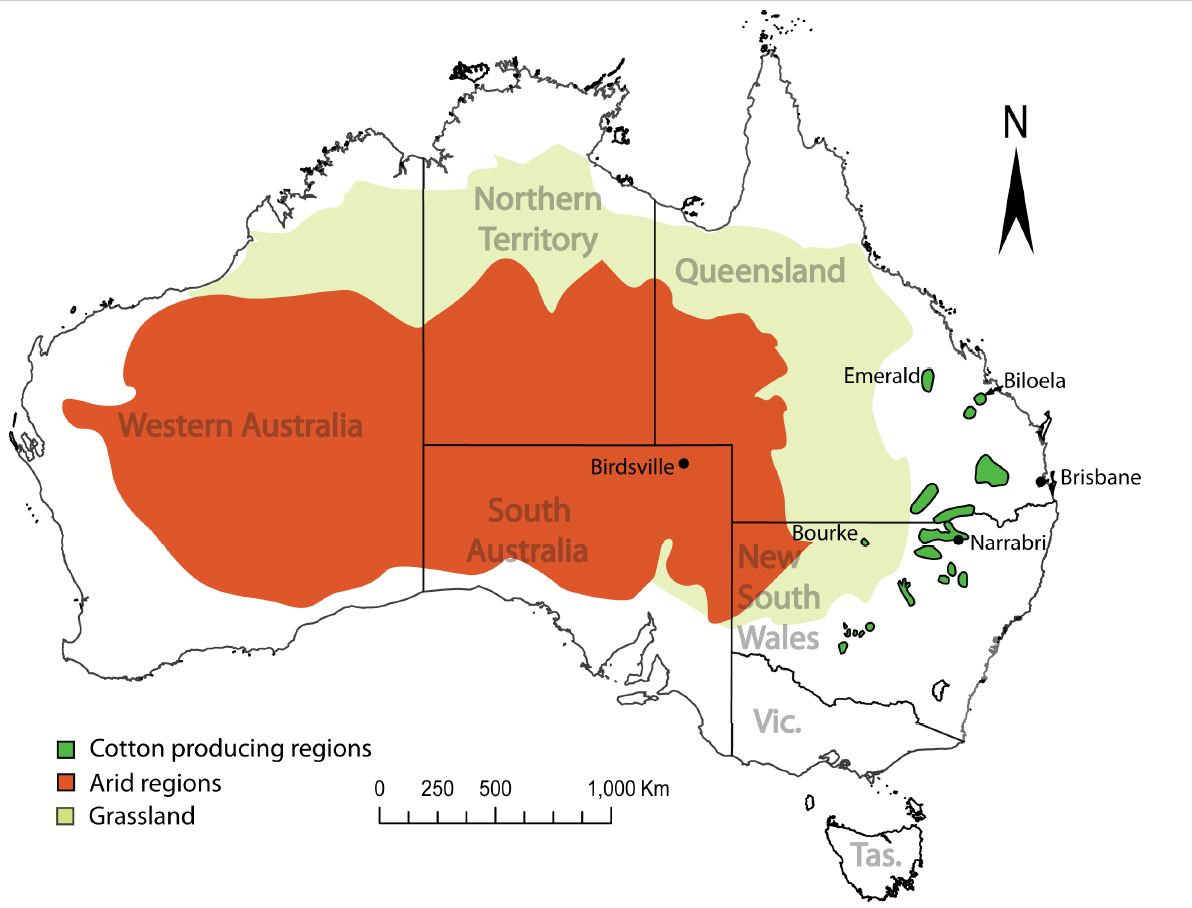

== Host plant relationships ==
Creontiades dilutus is highly polyphagous having been recorded from over 100 host plants (most in Fabaceae) and is therefore considered a generalist insect herbivore, it does not use all host plants equally, however. In its natural environment (the arid interior of Australia) it is found in much higher numbers on two plants in the genus Cullen, Cu. cinereum and Cu. Australasicum, it is also found more regularly on these two plant species than any other, leading to the designation of these plant species as primary hosts.

Although green mirids are now the primary pest of cotton this plant is a relatively bad host for mirids, low densities of green mirids are able to cause economic damage but high numbers are never found on Gossypium hirsutum. They do feed on and cause damage to many other agricultural crops, including soybean, green beans, stone fruits, grapes etc. In agricultural areas the highest densities are found in Lucerne and this observation lead to the suggestion that Lucerne could be grown next to cotton as a trap crop for mirids. Genetic tests of the gut contents of mirids in adjacent Cotton and Lucerne patches shows that these insects regularly move between these two plants and therefore Lucerne is more likely to provide higher numbers in cotton rather than reduce them

== Economic importance ==
The green mirid is currently the most serious insect pest of cotton in Australia, in that it is now the primary target of pesticide application in this crop. Prior to the introduction of transgenic cotton containing (insecticidal) Bt toxins green mirids were incidentally controlled by broad spectrum insecticides used to control Helicoverpa armigera. Currently pesticide use is much reduced because Bt cotton controls Helicoverpa armigera, but hemipterans are not affected by Bt toxins, and now mirids are the main target of pesticide application in cotton. This pattern of the emergence of sucking pests (heteroptera: true bugs) as the major target of insecticide control following the uptake of Bt cotton has been replicated in other countries but with different mirid species
