= Lidopus =

Scientific classification
- Domain: Eukaryota
- Kingdom: Animalia
- Phylum: Arthropoda
- Class: Insecta
- Order: Hemiptera
- Suborder: Heteroptera
- Family: Miridae
- Tribe: Isometopini
- Genus: Lidopus; Gibson, 1917

Genus of true bugs

Lidopus is a genus of jumping tree bugs in the family Miridae. There are at least two described species in Lidopus.

== Species ==
These two species belong to the genus Lidopus:

- Lidopus heidemanni Gibson, 1917
- Lidopus schwarzi (McAtee and Malloch, 1924)
