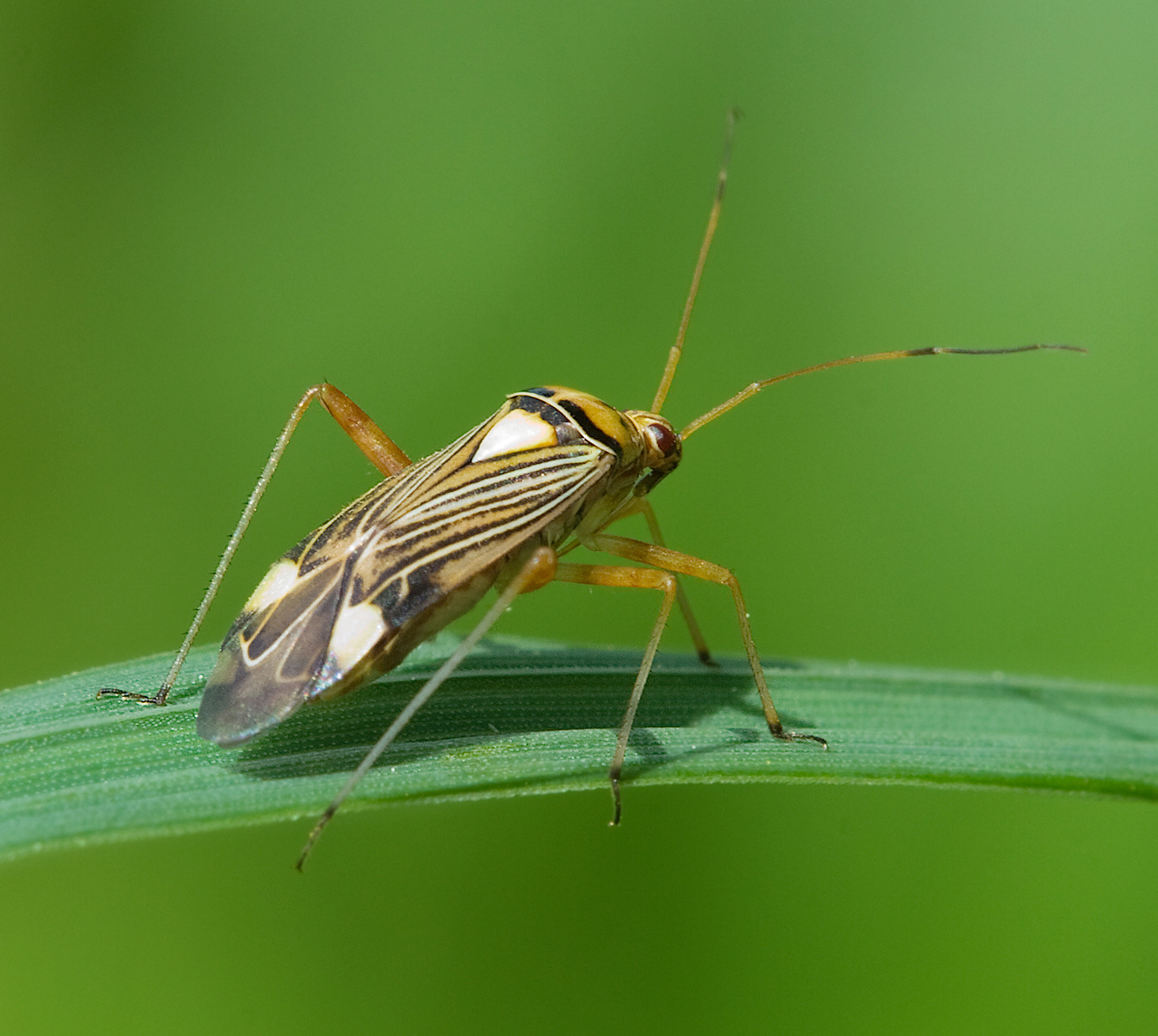
- Adult pale form of the Striped Oak Bug. Photograph taken in Perlacher Forst, Munich, Germany.

Scientific classification
- Domain: Eukaryota
- Kingdom: Animalia
- Phylum: Arthropoda
- Class: Insecta
- Order: Hemiptera
- Suborder: Heteroptera
- Family: Miridae
- Genus: Rhabdomiris
- Species: R. striatellus

Binomial name
- Rhabdomiris striatellus (Fabricius, 1794)

= Rhabdomiris striatellus =

Species of true bug

Rhabdomiris striatellus is a bug found widespread through the Europe with the exception of the extreme north and the southern Mediterranean. Its range extends east across Asia Minor to the Caucasus. It is common in the British Isles. The species is associated with oak trees. The body of the insect reaches 7–9 millimetres (0.3–0.4 in). The body is yellow to reddish brown and has yellow veins and dark stripes on its wings. The bug can also be much darker and similar to its relative, Miris striatus. The nymphs suck flowers and fruits while the adults prey on aphids and the larvae of other insects.
