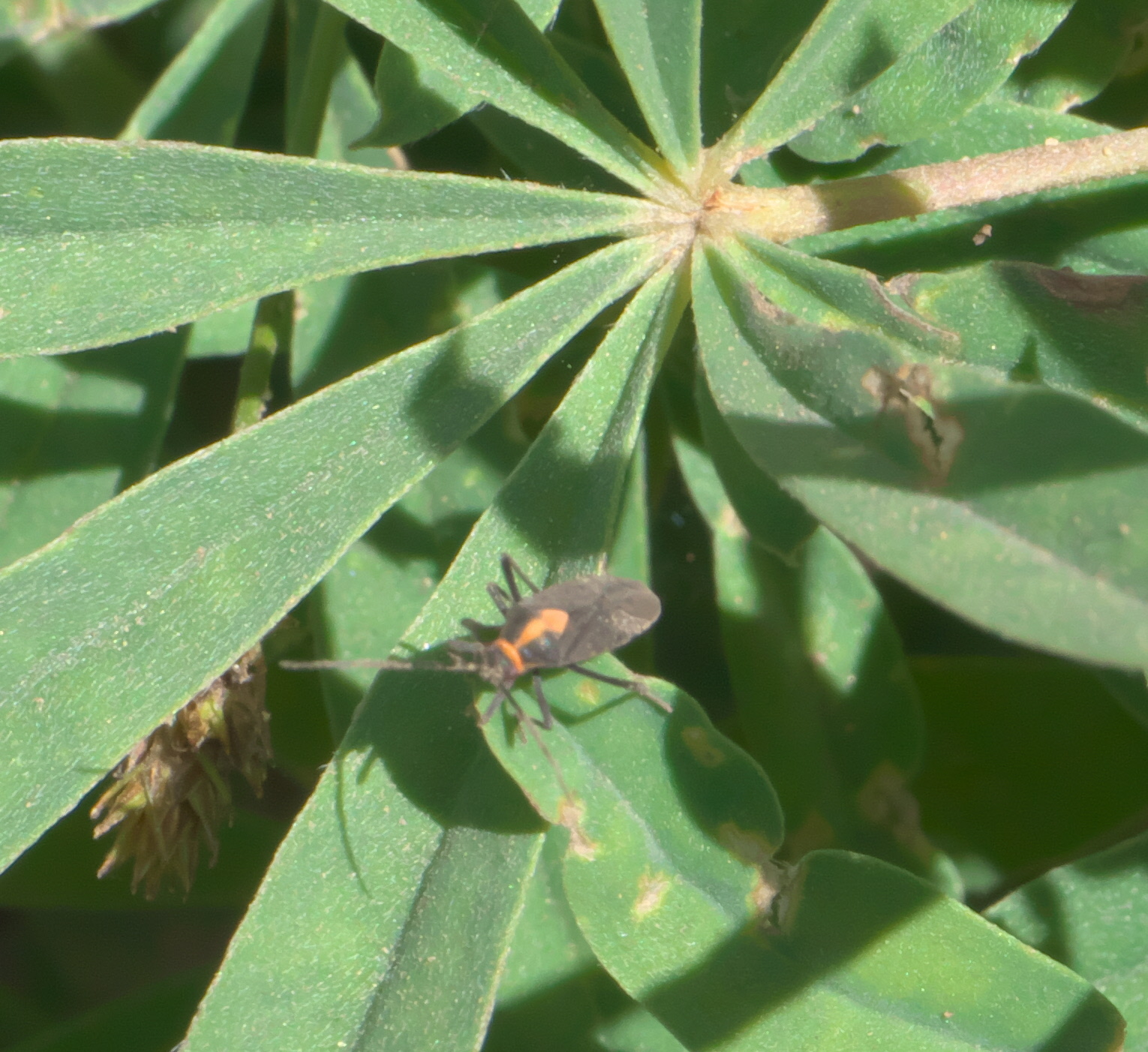
- Prepops

Scientific classification
- Kingdom: Animalia
- Phylum: Arthropoda
- Clade: Pancrustacea
- Class: Insecta
- Order: Hemiptera
- Suborder: Heteroptera
- Family: Miridae
- Subfamily: Mirinae
- Tribe: Restheniini; Reuter, 1905

= Restheniini =

Tribe of true bugs

Restheniini is a tribe of plant bugs in the family Miridae. There are at least 4 genera and 30 described species in Restheniini.

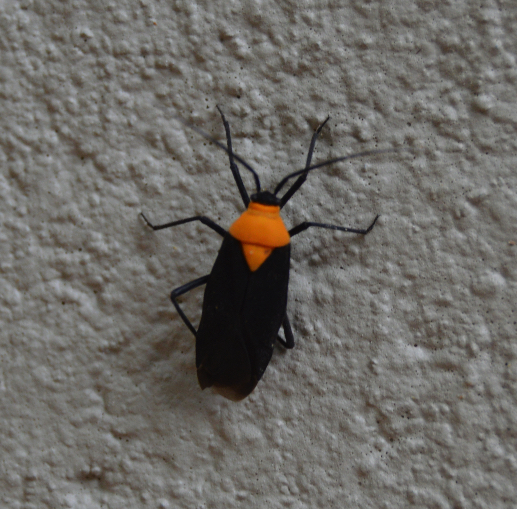
Prepops insitivus

== Genera ==
These four genera belong to the tribe Restheniini:

- Oncerometopus Reuter, 1876^{i c g}
- Opistheurista Carvalho, 1959^{i c g}
- Platytylus Fieber, 1858^{i c g}
- Prepops Reuter, 1905^{i c g}

Data sources: i = ITIS, c = Catalogue of Life, g = GBIF, b = Bugguide.net
