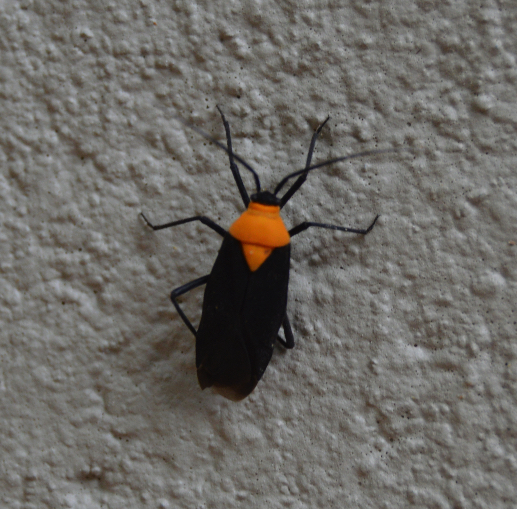
- Prepops insitivus

Scientific classification
- Kingdom: Animalia
- Phylum: Arthropoda
- Class: Insecta
- Order: Hemiptera
- Suborder: Heteroptera
- Family: Miridae
- Tribe: Restheniini
- Genus: Prepops; Reuter, 1905

Synonyms
- Opistheuria Reuter, 1907; Platytylellus Reuter, 1908

= Prepops =

Genus of true bugs

Prepops is a genus of plant bugs in the family Miridae. There are at least 190 described species in Prepops.

== See also ==
- List of Prepops species
