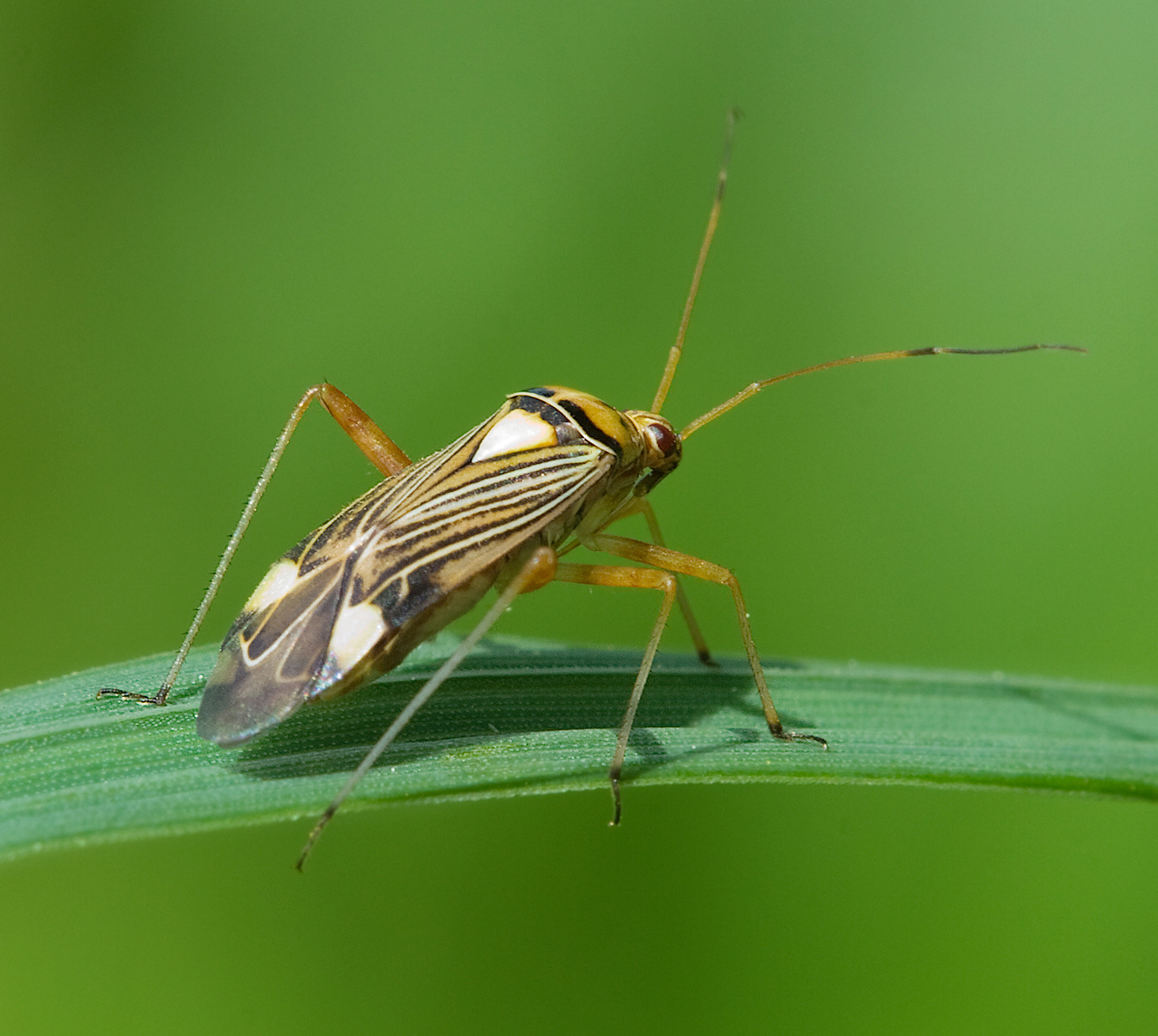
- Rhabdomiris striatellus

Scientific classification
- Kingdom: Animalia
- Phylum: Arthropoda
- Clade: Pancrustacea
- Class: Insecta
- Order: Hemiptera
- Suborder: Heteroptera
- Superfamily: Miroidea
- Family: Miridae; Hahn, 1831

Type species
- Cimex striatus L.

Subfamilies
- 1. Bryocorinae Baerensprung, 1860; 2. Cylapinae Kirkaldy, 1903; 3. Deraeocorinae Douglas & Scott, 1865; 4. Isometopinae Fieber, 1860; 5. Mirinae Hahn, 1833; 6. Orthotylinae Van Duzee, 1916; 7. Phylinae Douglas & Scott, 1865; 8. Psallopinae Schuh, 1976

Synonyms
- Capsidae Burmeister, 1835

= Miridae =

Family of true bugs

The Miridae are a large and diverse insect family at one time known by the taxonomic synonym Capsidae. Species in the family may be referred to as capsid bugs or "mirid bugs". Common names include plant bugs, leaf bugs, and grass bugs. It is the largest family of true bugs (suborder Heteroptera); it includes over 10,000 known species, and new ones are being described constantly. Most widely known mirids are species that are notorious agricultural pests that pierce plant tissues, feed on the sap, and sometimes transmit viral plant diseases. Some species however, are predatory.

== Description ==
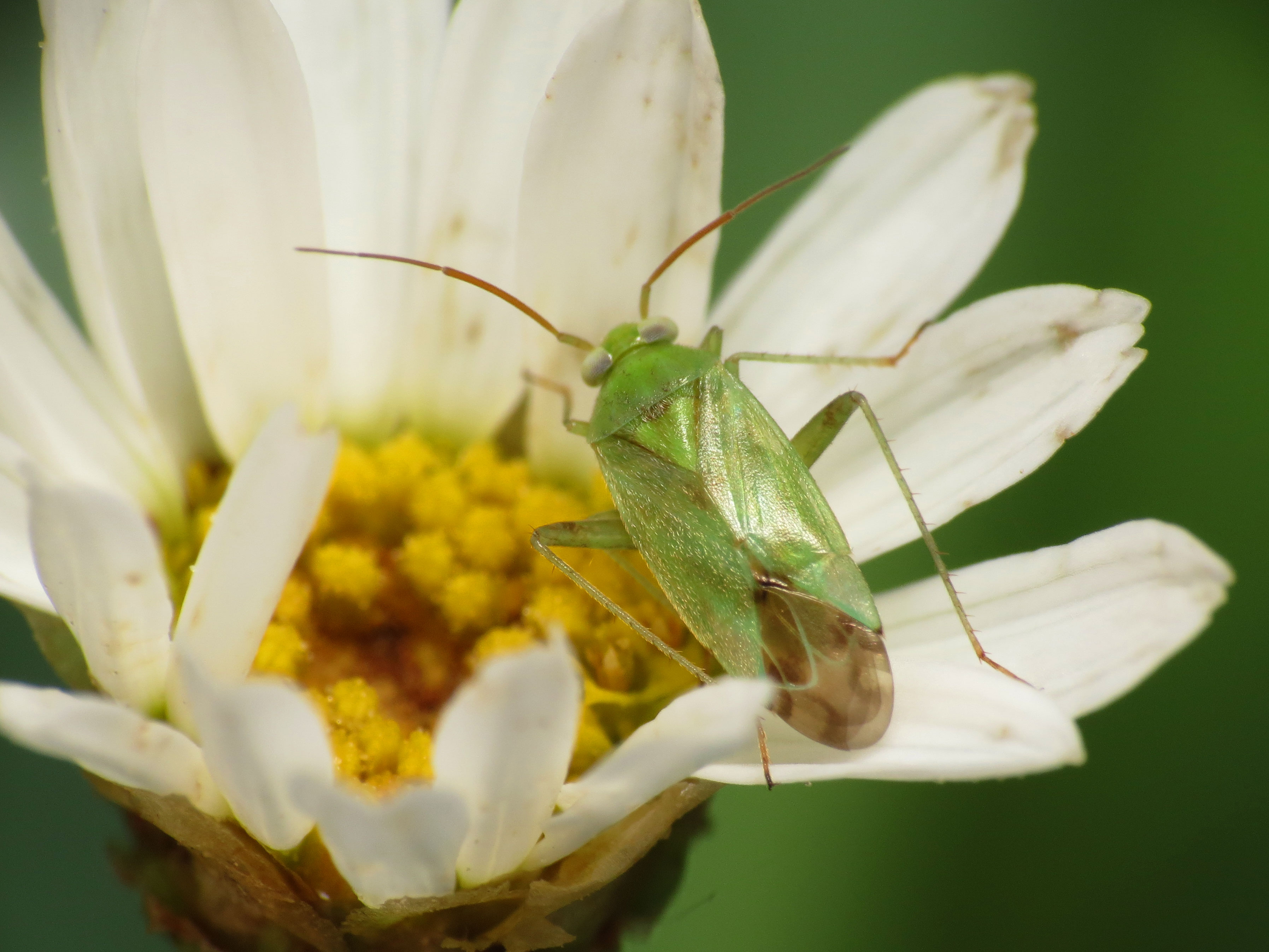
A typical mirid species, showing cuneus at the tip of the corium

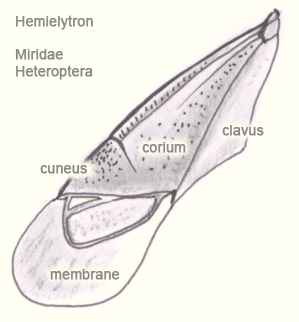
Wing of a species of Miridae, showing cuneus

Miridae are small, terrestrial insects, usually oval-shaped or elongate and measuring less than 12 millimetres (0.5 in) in length. Many of them have a hunched look, because of the shape of the prothorax, which carries the head bent down. Some are brightly coloured and attractively patterned, others drab or dark, most being inconspicuous. Some genera are ant mimics at certain stages of life. Miridae do not have any ocelli. Their rostrum has four segments. One useful feature in identifying members of the family is the presence of a cuneus; it is the triangular tip of the corium, the firm, sclerotized part of the forewing, the hemelytron. The cuneus is visible in nearly all Miridae, and only in a few other Hemiptera, notably the family Anthocoridae, which are not much like the Miridae in other ways. The tarsi almost always have three segments.

== Some mirid species ==
- Lygus bugs (Lygus spp.), including the tarnished and western tarnished plant bugs, are serious pests in the cotton, strawberry, and alfalfa industries.
- Stenotus binotatus, a minor pest of cereal crops, especially wheat
- Apple dimpling bug (Campylomma liebknechti) damages apple blossoms and small growing fruits.
- Mosquito bugs Helopeltis and Afropeltis spp. – that infest various crops including tea, cacao and cotton
- Honeylocust plant bug (Diaphnocoris chlorionis) damages foliage on honeylocust trees.

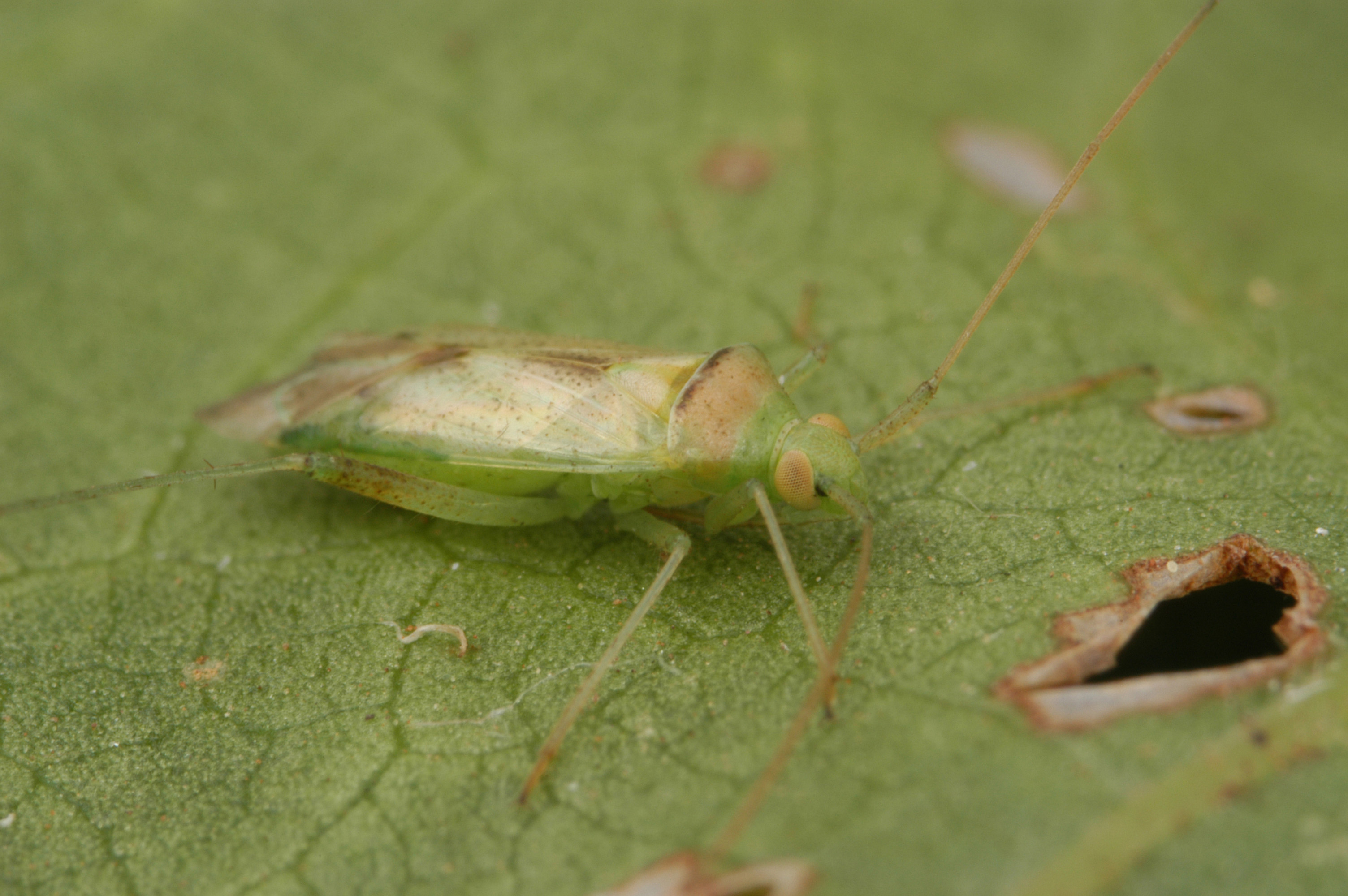
Creontiades dilutus

- Green mirid (Creontiades dilutus) damages many types of field crops.
- Potato capsid (Closterotomus norwegicus) is a noted pest of potato and clover plants in New Zealand.
- Deraeocoris nebulosus prefers other insects to plants in its diet, and has been used as a biocontrol agent against mites and scale insects.
- Dicyphus hesperus sucks sap from various plants and preys on whitefly and red spider mites and can be used in biological pest control.

== Systematics ==
This family includes a large number of species, many of which are still unknown, distributed in more than 1,300 genera. The taxonomic tree includes the following subfamilies and numerous tribes:

- Bryocorinae
  - Bryocorini
  - Dicyphini
  - Eccritotarsini
- Cylapinae
  - Cylapini
  - Fulviini
- Deraeocorinae
  - Clivinematini
  - Deraeocorini
  - Hyaliodini
  - Saturniomirini
  - Surinamellini
  - Termatophylini
- Isometopinae
  - Diphlebini
  - Isometopini
- Mirinae
  - Herdoniini
  - Hyalopeplini
  - Mirini
  - Pithanini
  - Restheniini
  - Stenodemini

Globiceps sp. - oviposition (Orthotylini)

- Orthotylinae
  - Ceratocapsini
  - Halticini
  - Orthotylini
- Phylinae
  - Hallodapini
  - Leucophoropterini
  - Phylini
  - Pilophorini

Psallopinae

Auth.: Schuh, 1976; includes:

- Isometopsallops Herczek & Popov, 1992
- Psallops Usinger, 1946
- † Extinct genera

=== Genera Incertae sedis ===
BioLib includes:

1. Amulacoris Carvalho & China, 1959
2. Anniessa Kirkaldy, 1903
3. Auchus Distant, 1893
4. Bahiarmiris Carvalho, 1977
5. Brasiliocarnus Kerzhner & Schuh, 1995
6. Carmelinus Carvalho & Gomes, 1972
7. Carmelus Drake & Harris, 1932
8. Chaetophylidea Knight, 1968
9. Charitides Kerzhner, 1962
10. Colimacoris Schaffner & Carvalho, 1985
11. Cylapocerus Carvalho & Fontes, 1968
12. Dimorphocoris Reuter, 1890
13. Duckecylapus Carvalho, 1982
14. Englemania Carvalho, 1985
15. Eurycipitia Reuter, 1905
16. Faliscomiris Kerzhner & Schuh, 1998
17. Fuscus Distant, 1884
18. Guerrerocoris Carvalho & China, 1959
19. Gunhadya - monotypic Gunhadya rubrofasciata Distant, 1920
20. Heterocoris Guérin-Ménéville in Sagra, 1857
21. Knightocoris Carvalho & China, 1951
22. Leonomiris Kerzhner & Schuh, 1998
23. Macrotyloides Van Duzee, 1916
24. Merinocapsus Knight, 1968
25. Mircarvalhoia Kerzhner & Schuh, 1998
26. Montagneria Akingbohungbe, 1978
27. Muirmiris Carvalho, 1983
28. Myochroocoris Reuter, 1909
29. Nesosylphas Kirkaldy, 1908
30. Notolobus Reuter, 1908
31. Nymannus Distant, 1904
32. Paracoriscus Kerzhner & Schuh, 1998
33. Paraguayna Carvalho, 1986
34. Prodomopsis TBD
35. Prodomus TBD
36. Pseudobryocoris Distant, 1884
37. Pygophorisca Carvalho & Wallerstein, 1978
38. Rayeria TBD
39. Rewafulvia Carvalho, 1972
40. Rhynacloa Reuter
41. Rondonisca Carvalho & Costa, 1994
42. Rondonoides Carvalho & Costa, 1994
43. Rondonotylus Carvalho & Costa, 1994
44. Spanogonicus Berg
45. Sthenaridia TBD
46. Zoilus Distant, 1884
