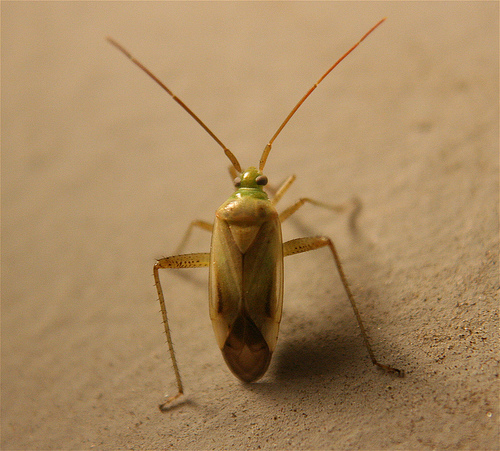
- Adelphocoris lineolatus

Scientific classification
- Kingdom: Animalia
- Phylum: Arthropoda
- Class: Insecta
- Order: Hemiptera
- Suborder: Heteroptera
- Family: Miridae
- Tribe: Mirini
- Genus: Adelphocoris; Reuter, 1896

Synonyms
- Fulgentius Distant, 1904; Trichophoroncus Reuter, 1896

= Adelphocoris =

Genus of true bugs

Adelphocoris is a genus of capsid bugs in the tribe Mirini. It is part of a genus group that now includes Creontiades, Megacoelum and Pseudomegacoelum.

== Species ==
The following species are included:

- Adelphocoris aethiopicus Poppius, 1912
- Adelphocoris albonotatus (Jakovlev, 1881)
- Adelphocoris bimaculicollis Lindberg, 1948
- Adelphocoris brunnescens Poppius, 1915
- Adelphocoris corallinus Kerzhner, 1988
- Adelphocoris demissus Horvath, 1905
- Adelphocoris detritus (Fieber, 1861)
- Adelphocoris dinsmorei Bliven, 1959
- Adelphocoris divergens Reuter, 1906
- Adelphocoris fasciaticollis Reuter, 1903
- Adelphocoris fasciiger Reuter, 1906
- Adelphocoris ferrugineus Hsiao, 1962
- Adelphocoris fijiensis Kerzhner & Schuh, 1995
- Adelphocoris flavovirens Yasunaga, 1996
- Adelphocoris funestus Reuter, 1903
- Adelphocoris fuscicornis Hsiao, 1962
- Adelphocoris hercynicus Wagner, 1938
- Adelphocoris idahoensis Bliven, 1959
- Adelphocoris insignis Horvath, 1898
- Adelphocoris insularis Poppius, 1915
- Adelphocoris josifovi Wagner, 1968
- Adelphocoris laeviusculus Vinokurov, 1976
- Adelphocoris lineolatus (Goeze, 1778)
- Adelphocoris luridus Reuter, 1906
- Adelphocoris melanocephalus Reuter, 1903
- Adelphocoris minor Wagner, 1969
- Adelphocoris nigritylus Hsiao, 1962
- Adelphocoris obliquefasciatus Lindberg, 1934
- Adelphocoris piceosetosus Kulik, 1965
- Adelphocoris ponghvariensis Josifov, 1978
- Adelphocoris quadripunctatus (Fabricius, 1794)
- Adelphocoris rapidus (Say, 1832)
- Adelphocoris reicheli (Fieber, 1836)
- Adelphocoris rufescens Hsiao, 1962
- Adelphocoris seticornis (Fabricius, 1775)
- Adelphocoris sichuanus Kerzhner & Schuh, 1995
- Adelphocoris sumatranus Poppius, 1915
- Adelphocoris superbus (Uhler, 1875)
- Adelphocoris suturalis (Jakovlev, 1882)
- Adelphocoris taeniophorus Reuter, 1906
- Adelphocoris tenebrosus (Reuter, 1875)
- Adelphocoris thoracatus (Stal, 1855)
- Adelphocoris tibetanus Zheng & H. Li, 1990
- Adelphocoris ticinensis (Meyer-Dur, 1843)
- Adelphocoris torquatus Reuter, 1906
- Adelphocoris triannulatus (Stal, 1858)
- Adelphocoris vandalicus (Rossi, 1790)
- Adelphocoris variabilis (Uhler, 1897)
- Adelphocoris vinokurovi Yasunaga, 1996
- Adelphocoris yunnanensis Zheng & H. Li, 1990
- Adelphocoris zoui Zheng & H. Li, 1990
