= Pseudomegacoelum beckeri =

Scientific classification
- Kingdom: Animalia
- Phylum: Arthropoda
- Class: Insecta
- Order: Hemiptera
- Suborder: Heteroptera
- Family: Miridae
- Subfamily: Mirinae
- Tribe: Mirini
- Genus: Pseudomegacoelum
- Species: P. beckeri

Binomial name
- Pseudomegacoelum beckeri (Fieber, 1870)

Synonyms
- List: Calocoris beckeri Fieber, 1870 (basionym); Calocoris fasciatus subsp. fasciata Jakovlev, 1875; Calocoris lethierryi Fieber, 1870; Calocoris rubidus Garbiglietti, 1869; Megacoelum beckeri (Fieber, 1870); Megacoelum beckeri subsp. fasciata Tamanini, 1982; Megacoelum beckeri subsp. fusca Stichel, 1930; Megacoelum beckeri subsp. rufotestaceus Stichel, 1930; Megacoelum fasciatus (Jakovlev, 1875); Megacoelum fusca Stichel, 1930; Megacoelum lethierryi (Fieber, 1870); Megacoelum pulchricorne Reuter, 1880; Megacoelum rubidus (Garbiglietti, 1869); Megacoelum ruficeps Reuter, 1880; Megacoelum rufotestaceus Stichel, 1930; Megacoelum strigipes Reuter, 1877

Species of true bugs

Pseudomegacoelum beckeri is a genus of capsid bugs in the tribe Mirini; it is the type species in its new genus, having previously been placed in the genus Megacoelum Fieber, 1858. This species is widespread throughout Europe, including the British Isles, where it can be found on Scots pine: Pinus sylvestris.

== See also ==
List of heteropteran bugs recorded in Britain
