= Adelphocoris rapidus =

Scientific classification
- Kingdom: Animalia
- Phylum: Arthropoda
- Class: Insecta
- Order: Hemiptera
- Suborder: Heteroptera
- Family: Miridae
- Genus: Adelphocoris
- Species: A. rapidus

Binomial name
- Adelphocoris rapidus (Say, 1832)

Synonyms
- A. superbus (Uhler, 1875); A. dinsmorei Bliven, 1959; A. idahoensis Bliven, 1959

Species of true bug

Adelphocoris rapidus, common names for which are rapid plant bug or superb plant bug, is a species of Hemiptera in the family Miridae, that can be found everywhere in the United States (except for central), and in the Peace–Athabasca Delta, Canada. The species are larger than other members of the family (7–8 millimetres or 0.28–0.31 inch), and are either yellowish-black or orange-black coloured.

== Life cycle ==
=== Egg ===
Females can lay 35–100 eggs. The greenish-white coloured eggs are laid singly in the stems of plants. The eggs could also be yellow coloured and can turn red by the time of hatching. They are 1.2–1.3 millimetres (0.047–0.051 inches) in length and are 0.3 millimetres (0.012 inches) wide. The eggs shape are cylindrical and are curved, which causes them to be mistaken for the eggs of tarnished plant bugs and pale legume bugs. However, the difference between the species eggs is that rapid plant bug's eggs have a distinct extension or spine. The incubation of the eggs takes 15–20 days of summer.

=== Nymph ===
The nymph have five stages of development and could appear either within 1.8, 2.4, 3.0, 3.8, or 4.8 days, with the total time of 15.4 days. When they appear, they are either brightly red or yellow coloured which depends on the stage in which they currently are. The start out as yellow coloured, transform to reddish-green by next stage, and ending up dark at the very last one. Their abdomen have a wide reddish-brown band that is located near the tip. The antennae have constantly changeable colour light and dark bands, which usually are of either red or yellow. Both the species abdomen and thorax don't have dark spots that are usually found on the tarnished and pale legume bugs.

=== Adult ===
The adults are 6.8–7.4 millimetres (0.27–0.29 inches) long, with yellowish to red coloured head, legs, and prothorax. Their pronotum is either yellow or yellowish-brown, although they have two large black spots near the hind margin. The hemelytra are brown other than for the lateral edges, which are narrow and yellow coloured. The antennae are black and are ringed with yellowish-white colour. The adult species also could fly, but not high, since the dispersal is not rapid.

== Enemies ==
Little is known about the predators that hunt this species. In Ontario, they might get eaten by a Peristenus pallipes, a species of parasitoids. The assassin and ambush bugs are common predators too, especially in Alberta.

== Pest ==
The species feed on alfalfa and sweet clover. They also enjoy feeding on vegetables such as beans, carrots, celery, and potatoes. But they don't stop there, they tend to feed on field crops such as cotton and sugarbeet and also on such weeds as Canada thistle (Cirsium arvense), Rumex and yarrow (Achillea).

== International names ==
The species are called capside du bouleau in French.
