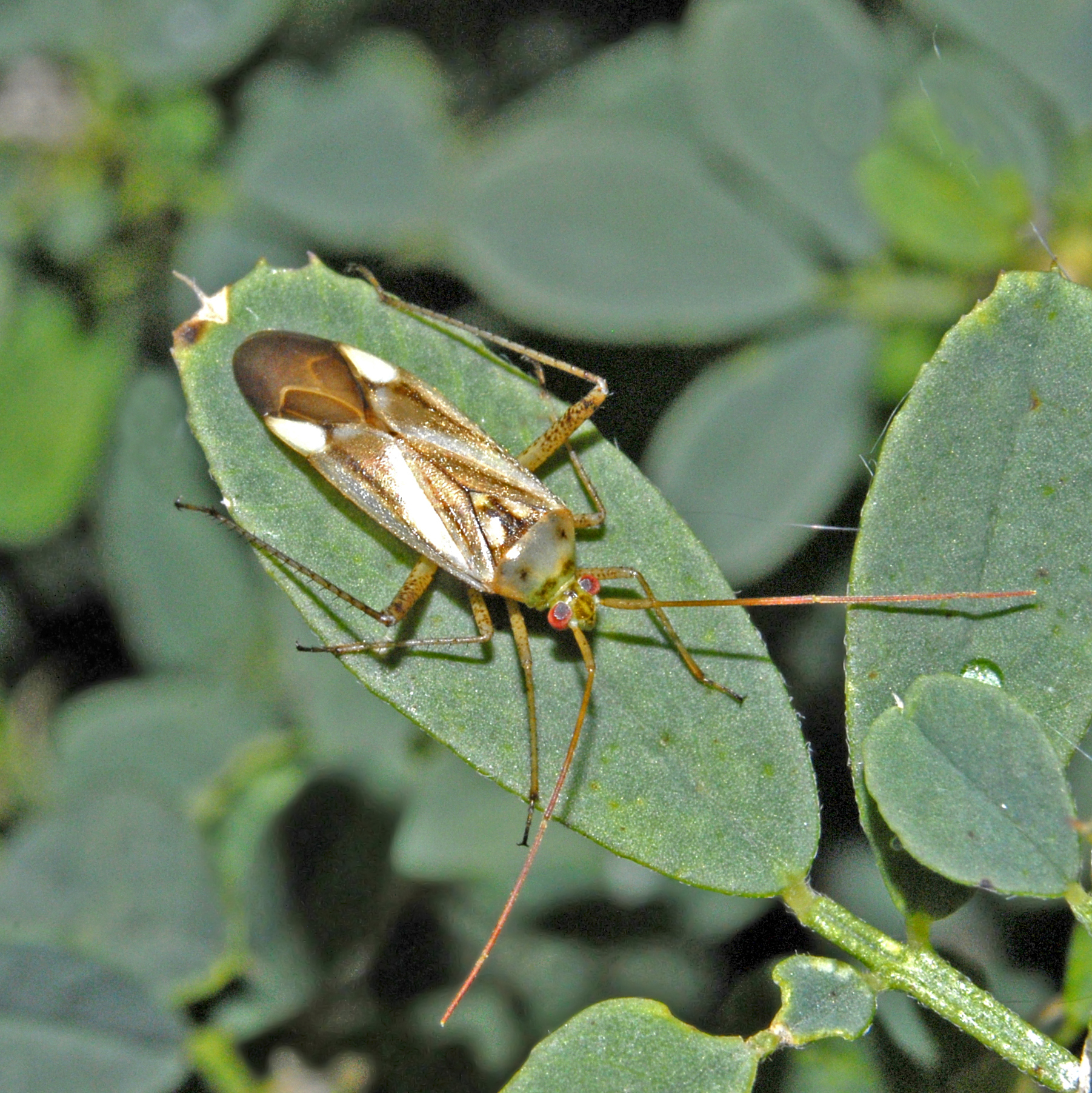

Scientific classification
- Kingdom: Animalia
- Phylum: Arthropoda
- Clade: Pancrustacea
- Class: Insecta
- Order: Hemiptera
- Suborder: Heteroptera
- Family: Miridae
- Genus: Adelphocoris
- Species: A. lineolatus

Binomial name
- Adelphocoris lineolatus (Goeze, 1778)

= Adelphocoris lineolatus =

Species of true bug

Adelphocoris lineolatus, is commonly known as the Lucerne bug or the alfalfa plant bug, and belongs to the family Miridae. It is an agricultural pest causing vast amounts of damage to numerous crops, but primarily to alfalfa crops around the globe.

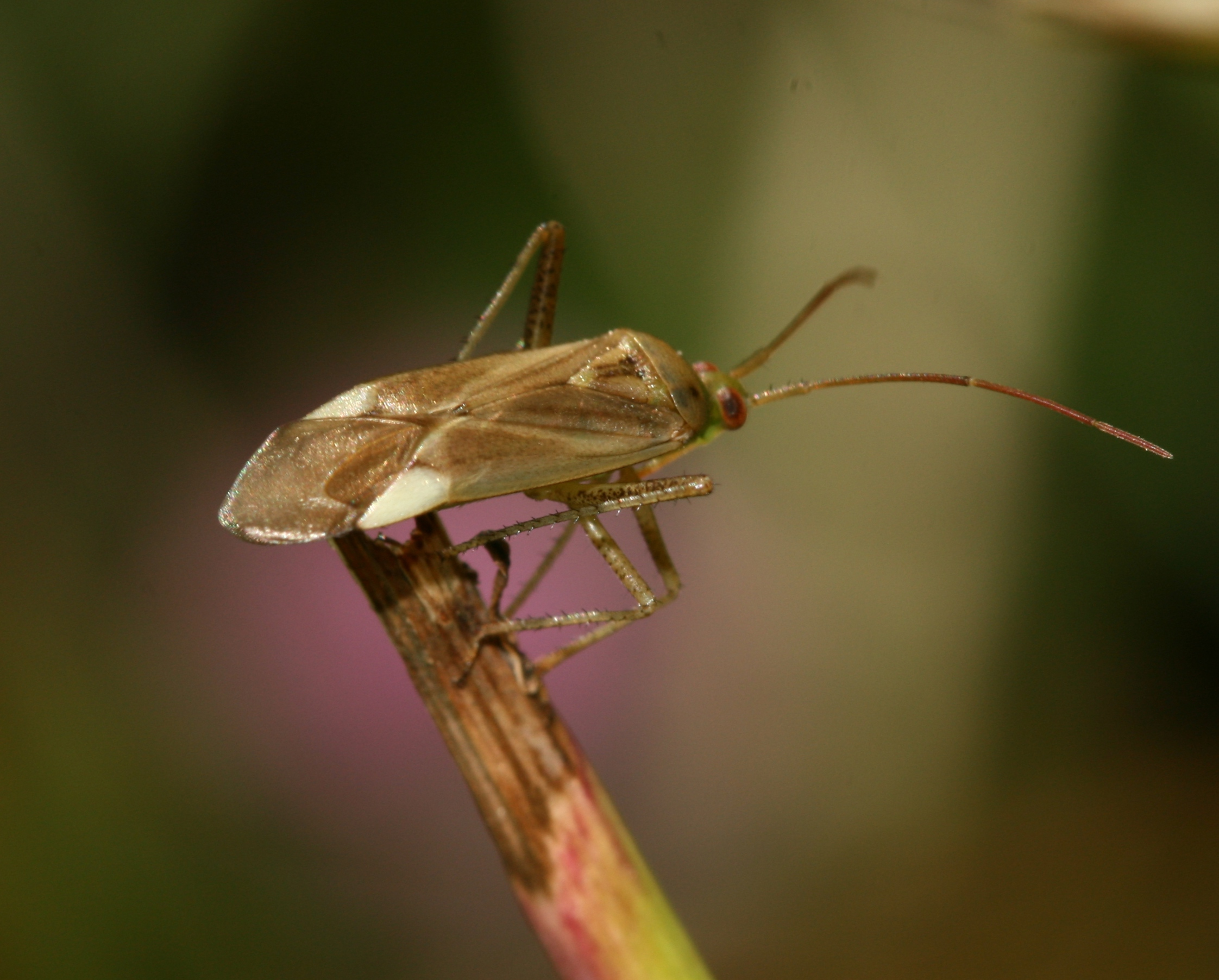
Adelphocoris lineolatus

== Synonyms ==
- Adelphocoris binotata Goeze
- Adelphocoris chenopodii Fallen, 1807
- Adelphocoris italica Tamanini, 1961
- Adelphocoris lineolatus baltrumensis Schumacher, 1911
- Adelphocoris lineolatus binotatus Wagner, 1960
- Adelphocoris lineolatus bisbipunctata Tamanini, 1982
- Calocoris chenopodii
- Calocoris chenopodii implagiata
- Calocoris chenopodii lineolatus
- Calocoris lineolatus bisbipunctatus Reuter, 1891

== Geographical distribution ==
Adelphocoris lineolatus are an Old World Species native to Western Europe, Northern Africa, Asia, and the Middle East. In 1917, this species had been introduced into Canada and the United States. In the Nearctic realm, these insects range from Southern Ontario and Northeastern United States, to the south of North Carolina, and west of Colorado.

== Habitat ==
Alfalfa plant bugs require a certain set of optimal conditions in order to thrive and become a pest in any country. A. lineolatus are primarily located in humid environments with cold temperatures. Commonly one can find these plant bugs in either fields or grasslands, in both dry and damp areas. However, alfalfa plant bugs are not successful in salty lakes, deserts, sand dunes, windy weather, or very warm climates. Adelphocoris lineolatus will easily adapt to cooler environmental conditions, which has allowed them to invade a large amount of territory in Canada.

== External anatomy and physical characteristics ==
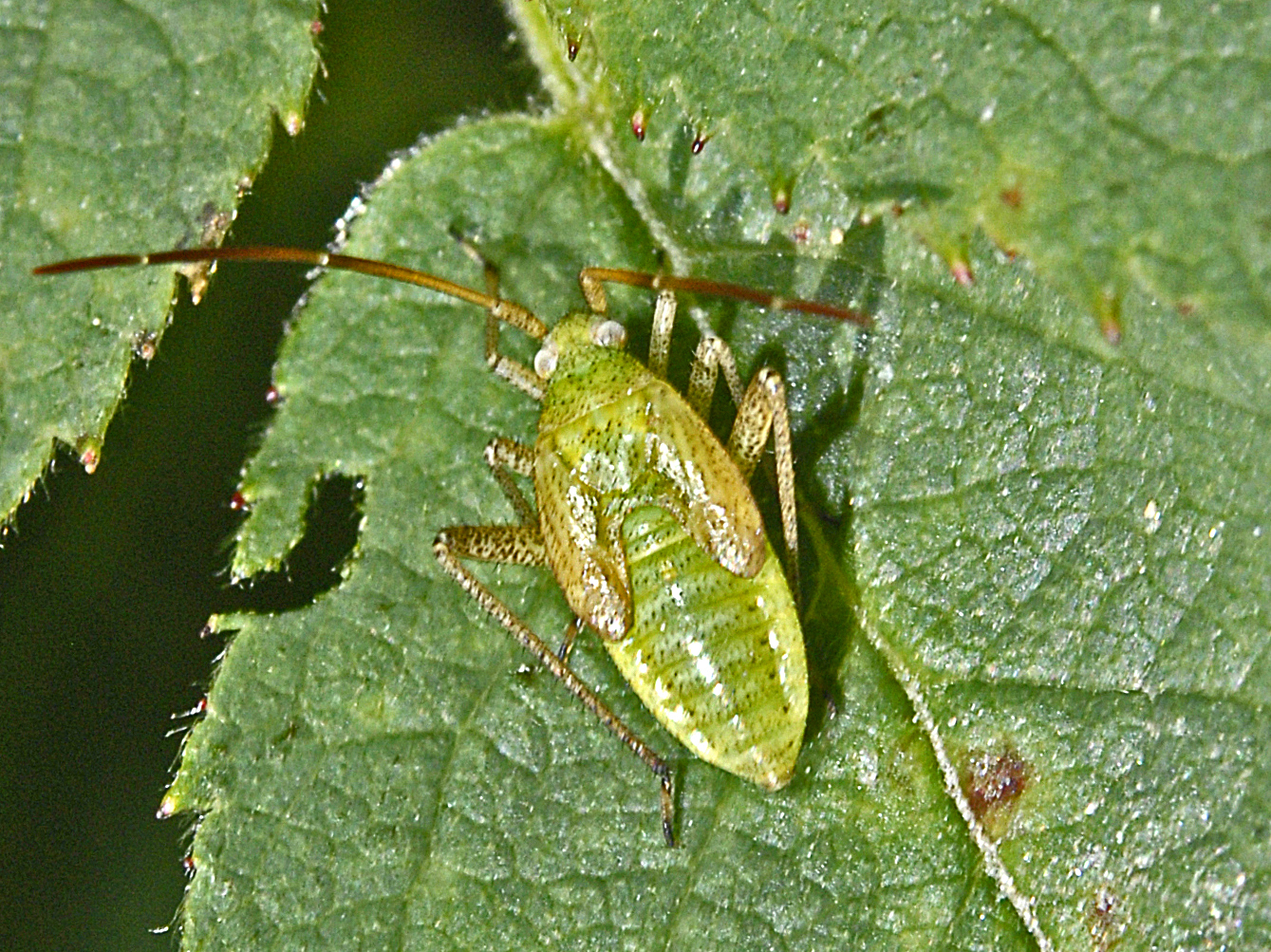
Nymph of Adelphocoris lineolatus

Adelphocoris lineolatus have an elongated body shape and are large in body size. Alfalfa plant bug males body size ranges from, 8.3-9.5 millimetres. Whereas, the females are a little bit smaller than the males having a body size between, 7.6 and 8.3 millimetres. Their antennae are usually the same length as their body size, sometimes a bit shorter. A longitudinal brown triangle is located on the middle of their corium. The scutellum of A. lineolatus have two longitudinal brown lines on the surface. The pronotum of the alfalfa plant bug will have two black spots on it. It commonly observed that their femora are spotted with brown specks. Also, the ocular index between male and female Adelphocoris lineolatus differs. Males have an ocular index of 0.83 millimetres. Whereas, females have an ocular index of 1.5 millimetres. Certain regions of their bodies are covered with black hairs, and others with pale coloured hairs. The body colour can range from a light green to a pale brown. Nymphs are green and have red eyes. In A. lineolatus nymphs there is an absence of wings, but in adult species wings are seen.

== Reproduction ==
Alfalfa plant bugs exhibit migratory behaviour, which allows Adelphocoris lineolatus to rapidly increase their population sizes. Adult females can lay 80 to 300 eggs, into branches and young stems of host plants, females will begin to lay eggs in the end of July. The eggs will develop in 8–12 days, but some of the eggs will overwinter. Eggs that have overwintered in stems, hatch in late May or early June. Less than five percent of alfalfa plant bug eggs will hatch in the same year they are laid. A majority of the eggs will enter a period of diapause. This causes a decline in the reproductive activity of second-generation adults. The developmental process of A. lineolatus involves five nymphal instars, and between late June and October adults are seen.

== Ecological and economical damage ==
Adelphocoris lineolatus nymphs and adults are generalists feeding on a variety of crops including alfalfa, bean, cotton, peach, and strawberry crops. Adults and nymphs will consume the reproductive and vegetative organs of their host plants, which are primarily alfalfa and cotton crops. By feeding on the reproductive and vegetative organs of their host plants, they cause stunted growth and deformation of flowers, fruits, and leaves. The eggs that have overwintered will hatch in spring and the A. lineolatus nymphs will begin to feed on various crops. Lucerne bugs will migrate onto summer host plants, such as, alfalfa and cotton because they will allow the successful colonization of A. lineolatus. Alfalfa and cotton crops can be either, flowering or non-flowering. Adelphocoris lineolatus have a stronger preference towards flowering crops, in comparison to non-flowering crops. Flowering alfalfa and cotton crops promote higher survival rates and nymphal development amongst this particular species. Non-flowering crops increase adult mortality rates and decrease fecundity in Adelphocoris lineolatus. On flowering alfalfa plants survival rates were five times higher than on non-flowering alfalfa crops for A. lineolatus adults. Flowering cotton crops had survival rates that were almost four times greater than that on the non-flowering cotton crops. Taking a closer look at Adelphocoris lineolatus nymphs, it was noted that nymphs took a greater amount of time to develop on non-flowering plants, which directly impacted the degree of damage they could cause to their host plants. A substantial degree of damage is done to flowering and non-flowering crops because Adelphocoris lineolatus nymphs and adults have similar feeding habits, allowing them to inhabit one particular plant for their whole life cycle.

Nymphs and adults belonging to Adelphocoris lineolatus are capable of reducing crop yields by 50% within two years of their infestation on crops. The livelihood of many individuals within developing countries has been negatively affected due to the rapid spread of alfalfa plant bugs, due to their migratory behaviour. They have destroyed numerous alfalfa crops around the globe. In Canada alone they have caused a deficit of $50 million to the alfalfa plant industry.

== Semiochemicals ==
Alfalfa plant bugs have a greater degree of attraction towards flowering plants in comparison to non-flowering plants. The three main crops that Adelphocoris lineolatus show the most attraction for are flowering alfalfa, cotton, and mung bean crops. Biologists have observed a relationship between three chemosensory proteins found in the antennae of A. lineolatus and the semiochemicals released by flowering alfalfa, cotton, and mung bean crops resulting in a greater attraction towards these crops. AlinCSP1, AlinCSP2, and AlinCSP-3 are the three chemosensory proteins found in the antennae of Adelphocoris lineolatus. Insects are heavily dependent upon their olfactory sensilla in order to detect chemical stimuli from the environment they are found in. Within the Adelphocoris lineolatus species, it has been found that they detect the semiochemicals released by their host plants in order to invade them. The chemosensory proteins, AlinCSP1, AlinCSP2, and AlinCSP-3 contain a high binding affinity to the semiochemicals released by flowering alfalfa, cotton, and mung bean plants. The greatest amount of ecological and economical damage is experienced by these flowering plants because of the semiochemicals they release into the environment, attracting Adelphocoris lineolatus.

== Control techniques ==
Adelphocoris lineolatus are commonly known as the alfalfa plant bug, due to the excessive amount of damage they cause to alfalfa crops around the world. In order to decrease and prevent the rapid dispersal of A. lineolatus certain control methods need to be implemented, to decrease the amount of ecological and economic damage these pests cause. Insecticides are not commonly used to decrease or stop Adelphocoris lineolatus from infesting crops because these insects have become resistant to certain chemicals present in insecticides. A. lineolatus nymphs have become resistant to the following chemical ingredients commonly used in insecticides, mono-methanimidamide, fufenozide, buprofezin, azad irachtin, and triazophos. An alternative from these chemicals would be to use insecticides made of pyrethroid, neonicotinoid, carbamate, avermectin, or organophosphate since alfalfa plant bugs are not resistant to these chemicals. Insecticides can be an effective and efficient method of controlling pests, but they do cause a great deal of damage to our environment and we should refrain from using them if possible.

Insect pheromones have successfully been implemented to reduce the amount of damage Adelphocoris lineolatus cause to numerous agricultural crops. Sexually mature A. lineolatus produce a mixture of two pheromones known as, (E)-2-hexenyl butyrate (E2HB) and (E)-4-oxo-2-hexenal (4-OHE). These pheromones are responsible for high reproductive rates amongst the alfalfa plant bug. To reduce reproductivity between female and male Adelphocoris lineolatus, an excessive amount of hexyl butyrate (HB) needs to be added to the mixture of E2HB and 4-OHE. The addition of HB reduces the attraction between female and male A. lineolatus. Hexyl butyrate is responsible for stopping the release of sex pheromones from female alfalfa plant bugs, which disrupts communication between the two sexes, and reduces reproductive success in this particular species.
