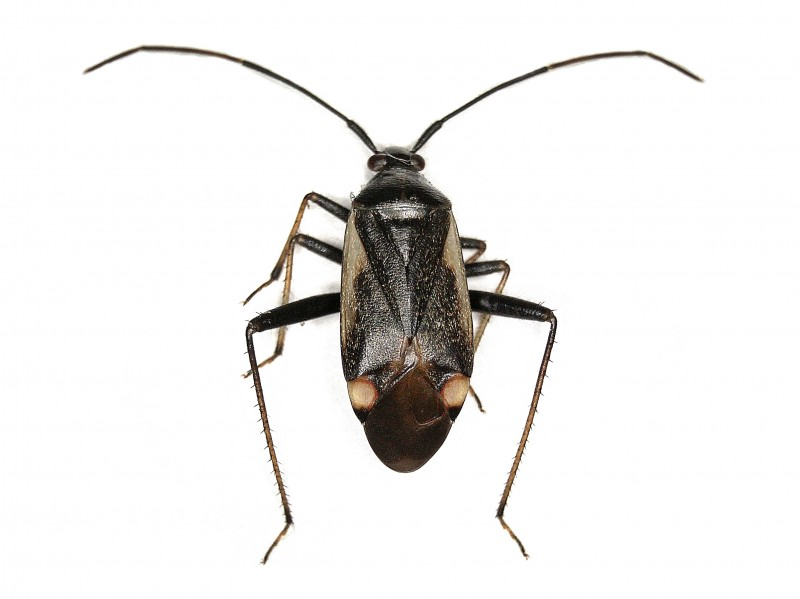
- Adelphocoris seticornis Arnhem, the Netherlands

Scientific classification
- Kingdom: Animalia
- Phylum: Arthropoda
- Class: Insecta
- Order: Hemiptera
- Suborder: Heteroptera
- Family: Miridae
- Genus: Adelphocoris
- Species: A. seticornis

Binomial name
- Adelphocoris seticornis (Fabricius, 1775)

= Adelphocoris seticornis =

Species of true bug

Adelphocoris seticornis is a Palearctic species of true bug.
