= Pseudomegacoelum =

Scientific classification
- Domain: Eukaryota
- Kingdom: Animalia
- Phylum: Arthropoda
- Class: Insecta
- Order: Hemiptera
- Suborder: Heteroptera
- Family: Miridae
- Subfamily: Mirinae
- Tribe: Mirini
- Genus: Pseudomegacoelum; Chérot & Malipatil, 2016

Synonyms
- Megacoelum Fieber, 1858

Genus of true bugs

Pseudomegacoelum is a genus of mostly European capsid bugs in the tribe Mirini, erected by Chérot and Malipatil in 2016. The type species, Pseudomegacoelum beckeri (previously placed in genus Megacoelum) is recorded from northern Europe including the British Isles.

== Species ==
According to BioLib the following are included:

1. Pseudomegacoelum angustum (Wagner, 1965)
2. Pseudomegacoelum beckeri (Fieber, 1870)
  - type species (as Calocoris beckeri Fieber, 1870)
3. Pseudomegacoelum irbilanum (Linnavuori, 1988)
4. Pseudomegacoelum quercicola (Linnavuori, 1965)
