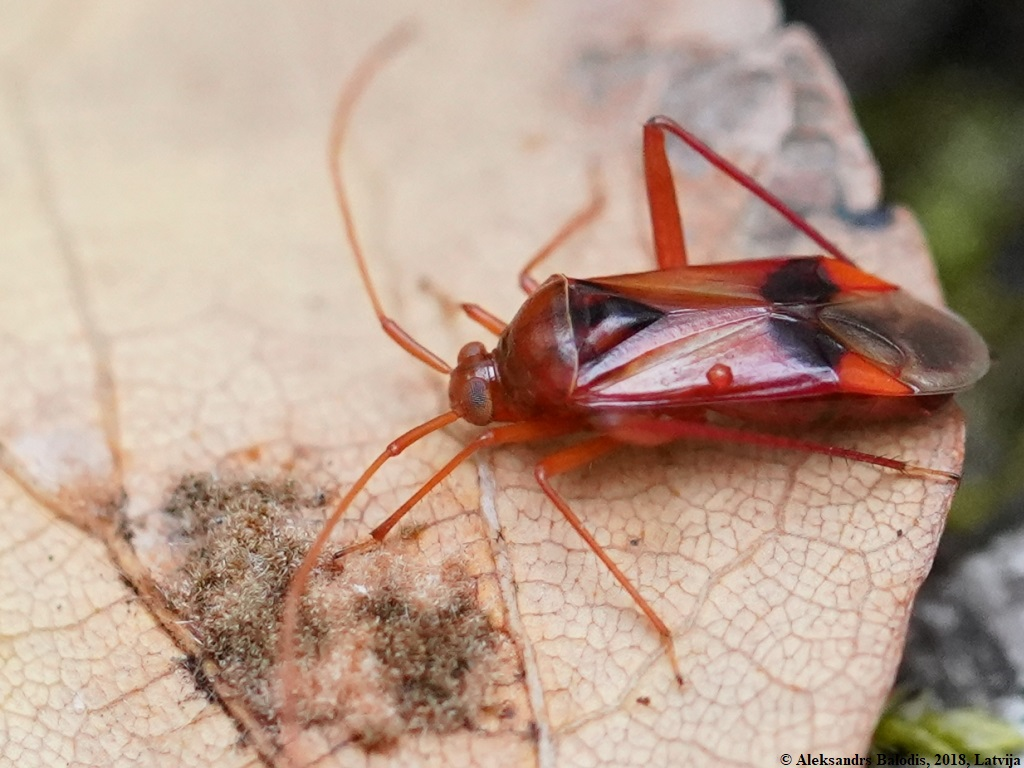
- Megacoelum infusum

Scientific classification
- Domain: Eukaryota
- Kingdom: Animalia
- Phylum: Arthropoda
- Class: Insecta
- Order: Hemiptera
- Suborder: Heteroptera
- Family: Miridae
- Subfamily: Mirinae
- Tribe: Mirini
- Genus: Megacoelum; Fieber, 1858

Synonyms
- Meginoe Kirkaldy, 1902

= Megacoelum =

Genus of true bugs

Megacoelum is a genus of European, African, Asian and Australian capsid bugs in the tribe Mirini, erected by Franz Xaver Fieber in 1858. The species Megacoelum infusum is recorded from northern Europe including the British Isles. (Note: "Megacoelum beckeri" is now placed in the genus Pseudomegacoelum Chérot & Malipatil, 2016)

== Species ==
According to BioLib the following are included:

1. Megacoelum andromakhe Linnavuori, 1974
2. Megacoelum apicale Reuter, 1882
3. Megacoelum biseratense (Distant, 1903)
4. Megacoelum brevirostre Reuter, 1879
5. Megacoelum brunnetii Distant, 1909
6. Megacoelum esmedorae Ballard, 1927
7. Megacoelum formosanum (Poppius, 1915)
8. Megacoelum hormozganicum Linnavuori, 2004
9. Megacoelum infusum (Herrich-Schäffer, 1837)
10. Megacoelum macrophthalmum Reuter, 1907
11. Megacoelum marginandum Distant, 1909
12. Megacoelum minutum Poppius, 1915
13. Megacoelum modestum Distant, 1904
14. Megacoelum myrti Linnavuori, 1965
15. Megacoelum nigroscutellatum Distant, 1920
16. Megacoelum oculare Wagner, 1957
17. Megacoelum patrum Distant, 1909
18. Megacoelum pellucens Puton, 1881
19. Megacoelum pistaceae V.G. Putshkov, 1976
20. Megacoelum quadrituberculatum Poppius, 1912
21. Megacoelum rubrolineatum Linnavuori, 1975
22. Megacoelum salsolae Linnavuori, 1986
23. Megacoelum schoutedeni Reuter, 1904
24. Megacoelum sordidum Reuter, 1904
25. Megacoelum suffusum Distant, 1904
26. Megacoelum superbum Linnavuori, 1975
27. Megacoelum tricolor Wagner, 1953
28. Megacoelum zollikoferiae (Lindberg, 1953)
