= List of aquatic heteropteran bug species of Great Britain =

This is a list of aquatic heteropteran bug species recorded in Britain.

== Family Nepidae ==
- Nepa cinerea
- Ranatra linearis

== Family Corixidae ==
- Micronecta scholtzi
- Micronecta griseola
- Micronecta minutissima
- Micronecta poweri
- Cymatia bonsdorffii
- Cymatia coleoptrata
- Glaenocorisa propinqua
- Arctocorisa carinata
- Arctocorisa germari
- Callicorixa praeusta
- Callicorixa wollastoni
- Corixa affinis
- Corixa dentipes
- Corixa iberica
- Corixa panzeri
- Corixa punctata
- Hesperocorixa castanea
- Hesperocorixa linnaei
- Hesperocorixa moesta
- Hesperocorixa sahlbergi
- Paracorixa concinna
- Sigara selecta
- Sigara stagnalis
- Sigara nigrolineata
- Sigara limitata
- Sigara semistriata
- Sigara venusta
- Sigara dorsalis
- Sigara striata
- Sigara distincta
- Sigara falleni
- Sigara fallenoidea
- Sigara fossarum
- Sigara scotti
- Sigara lateralis

== Family Naucoridae ==
- Ilyocoris cimicoides
- Naucoris maculatus

== Family Aphelocheiridae ==
- Aphelocheirus aestivalis

== Family Notonectidae ==
- Notonecta glauca
- Notonecta maculata
- Notonecta obliqua
- Notonecta viridis

== Family Pleidae ==
- Plea minutissima

== Family Mesoveliidae ==
- Mesovelia furcata

== Family Hebridae ==
- Hebrus pusillus
- Hebrus ruficeps

== Family Hydrometridae ==
- Hydrometra gracilenta
- Hydrometra stagnorum

== Family Veliidae ==
- Microvelia buenoi
- Microvelia pygmaea
- Microvelia reticulata
- Velia caprai
- Velia saulii

== Family Gerridae ==
- Aquarius najas
- Aquarius paludum
- Gerris argentatus
- Gerris costae
- Gerris gibbifer
- Gerris lacustris
- Gerris odontogaster
- Gerris thoracicus
- Gerris lateralis
- Limnoporus rufoscutellatus

== See also ==
- Heteropteran
- British Isles
