= Water boatman =

Water boatman as a type of aquatic insect can mean:

- Corixa punctata, a species known as the lesser water boatman in the United Kingdom
- Corixidae, a family known as water boatmen in the United States and Australia
- Notonecta glauca, a species known as the greater water boatman in the United Kingdom (called the backswimmer in the United States)
- Sigara, especially Sigara arguta, known as water boatmen in New Zealand

== See also ==
- Boatman (disambiguation)
