= Hesperocorixa lobata =

Scientific classification
- Kingdom: Animalia
- Phylum: Arthropoda
- Class: Insecta
- Order: Hemiptera
- Suborder: Heteroptera
- Family: Corixidae
- Tribe: Corixini
- Genus: Hesperocorixa
- Species: H. lobata

Binomial name
- Hesperocorixa lobata (Hungerford, 1925)

Species of true bug

Hesperocorixa lobata is a species of water boatman in the family Corixidae. It is found in North America.

== History ==
Hesperocorixa lobata was first described scientifically by the American entomologist Herbert Hungerford in 1925.
