= Hesperocorixa atopodonta =

Scientific classification
- Domain: Eukaryota
- Kingdom: Animalia
- Phylum: Arthropoda
- Class: Insecta
- Order: Hemiptera
- Suborder: Heteroptera
- Family: Corixidae
- Tribe: Corixini
- Genus: Hesperocorixa
- Species: H. atopodonta

Binomial name
- Hesperocorixa atopodonta (Hungerford, 1927)

Species of true bug

Hesperocorixa atopodonta is a species of water boatman in the family Corixidae. It is found in North America.
