= Hesperocorixa obliqua =

Scientific classification
- Domain: Eukaryota
- Kingdom: Animalia
- Phylum: Arthropoda
- Class: Insecta
- Order: Hemiptera
- Suborder: Heteroptera
- Family: Corixidae
- Tribe: Corixini
- Genus: Hesperocorixa
- Species: H. obliqua

Binomial name
- Hesperocorixa obliqua (Hungerford, 1925)

Species of true bug

Hesperocorixa obliqua is a species of water boatman in the family Corixidae. It is found in North America.
