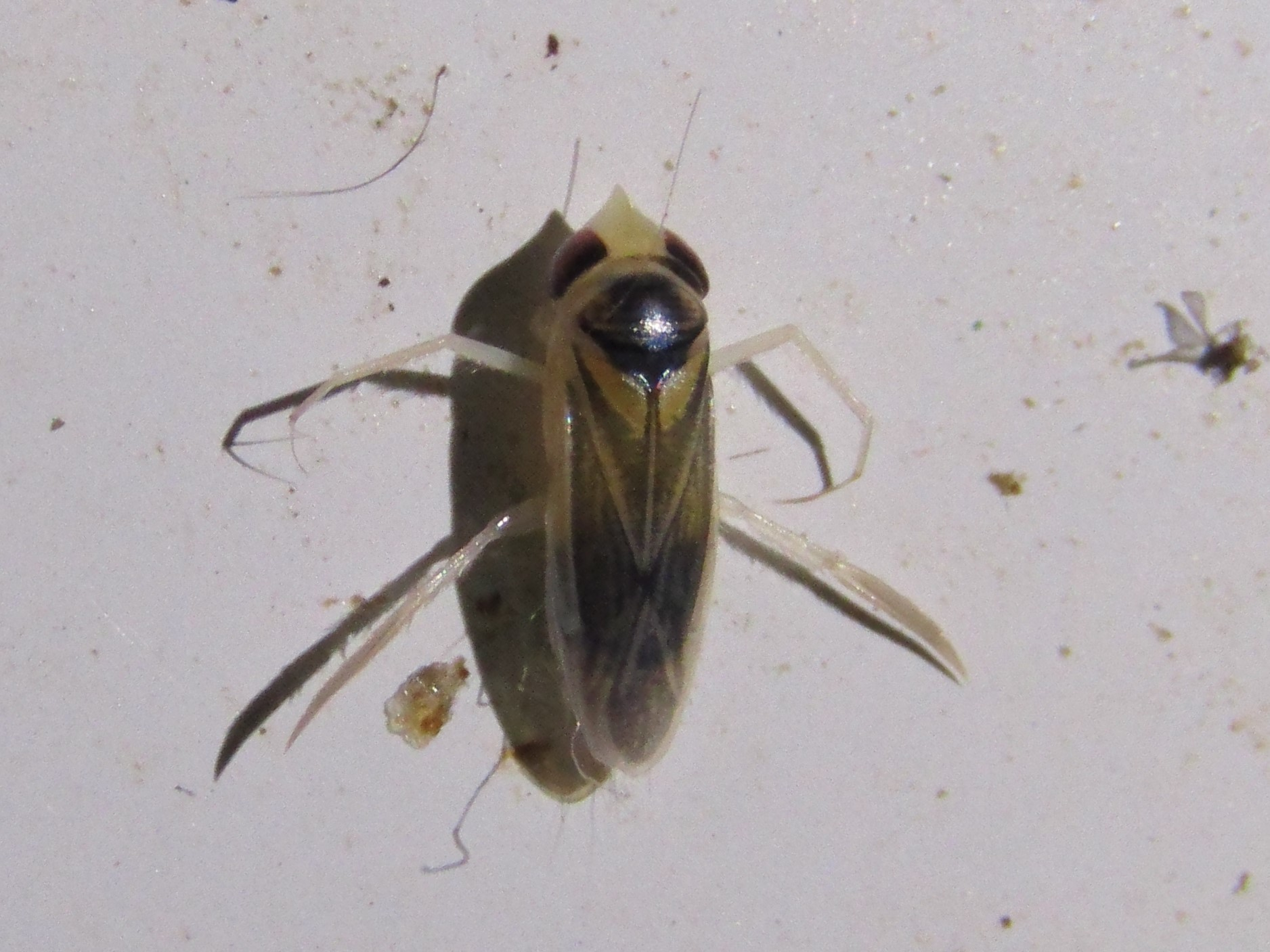

Scientific classification
- Domain: Eukaryota
- Kingdom: Animalia
- Phylum: Arthropoda
- Class: Insecta
- Order: Hemiptera
- Suborder: Heteroptera
- Family: Corixidae
- Tribe: Corixini
- Genus: Ramphocorixa
- Species: R. acuminata

Binomial name
- Ramphocorixa acuminata (Uhler, 1897)

Synonyms
- Ramphocorixa balanodis Abbott, 1912

= Ramphocorixa acuminata =

Species of true bug

Ramphocorixa acuminata, the acuminate water boatman, is a species of water boatman in the family Corixidae. It is found in Central America and North America.
