= Hesperocorixa laevigata =

Scientific classification
- Domain: Eukaryota
- Kingdom: Animalia
- Phylum: Arthropoda
- Class: Insecta
- Order: Hemiptera
- Suborder: Heteroptera
- Family: Corixidae
- Tribe: Corixini
- Genus: Hesperocorixa
- Species: H. laevigata

Binomial name
- Hesperocorixa laevigata (Uhler, 1893)

Species of true bug

Hesperocorixa laevigata is a species of water boatman in the family Corixidae. It is found in Central America and North America.
