= Sigara conocephala =

Scientific classification
- Domain: Eukaryota
- Kingdom: Animalia
- Phylum: Arthropoda
- Class: Insecta
- Order: Hemiptera
- Suborder: Heteroptera
- Family: Corixidae
- Tribe: Corixini
- Genus: Sigara
- Species: S. conocephala

Binomial name
- Sigara conocephala (Hungerford, 1926)

Species of true bug

Sigara conocephala is a species of water boatman in the family Corixidae. It is found in North America.
