= Hesperocorixa vulgaris =

Scientific classification
- Domain: Eukaryota
- Kingdom: Animalia
- Phylum: Arthropoda
- Class: Insecta
- Order: Hemiptera
- Suborder: Heteroptera
- Family: Corixidae
- Tribe: Corixini
- Genus: Hesperocorixa
- Species: H. vulgaris

Binomial name
- Hesperocorixa vulgaris (Hungerford, 1925)

Species of true bug

Hesperocorixa vulgaris is a species of water boatman in the family Corixidae. It is found in North America. These insects are most active in spring to autumn and feed on algae, which they sometimes stir up from waterbeds. When threatened they will give a painful bite.
