= Hesperocorixa moesta =

Scientific classification
- Domain: Eukaryota
- Kingdom: Animalia
- Phylum: Arthropoda
- Class: Insecta
- Order: Hemiptera
- Suborder: Heteroptera
- Family: Corixidae
- Genus: Hesperocorixa
- Species: H. moesta

Binomial name
- Hesperocorixa moesta (Fieber, 1848)

Species of true bug

Hesperocorixa moesta is a species of water boatman in the family Corixidae in the order Hemiptera.
