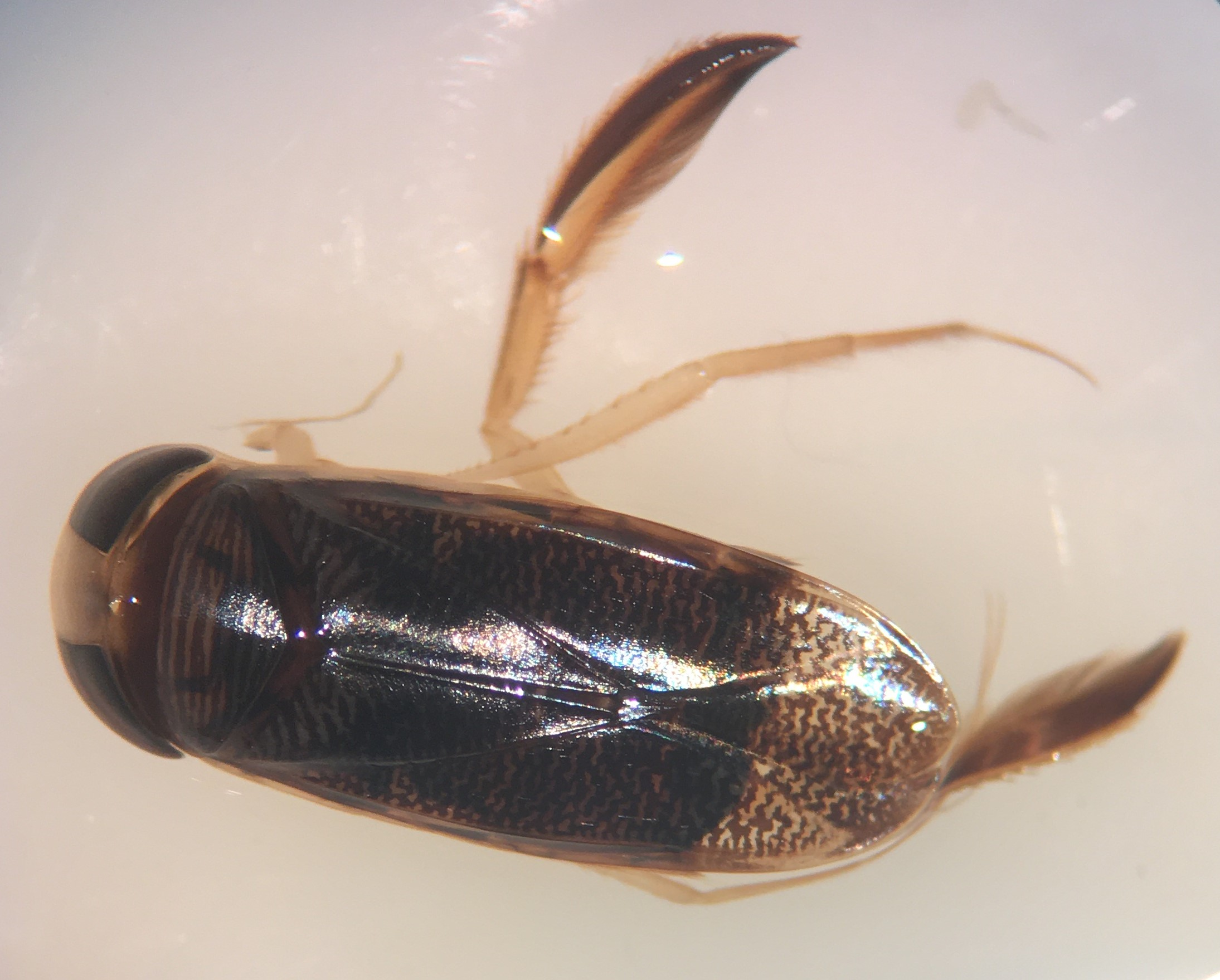

Scientific classification
- Domain: Eukaryota
- Kingdom: Animalia
- Phylum: Arthropoda
- Class: Insecta
- Order: Hemiptera
- Suborder: Heteroptera
- Family: Corixidae
- Genus: Hesperocorixa
- Species: H. interrupta

Binomial name
- Hesperocorixa interrupta (Say, 1825)

= Hesperocorixa interrupta =

Species of true bug

Hesperocorixa interrupta is a species of water boatman in the family Corixidae. It is found in North America.
