= Dasycorixa rawsoni =

Scientific classification
- Domain: Eukaryota
- Kingdom: Animalia
- Phylum: Arthropoda
- Class: Insecta
- Order: Hemiptera
- Suborder: Heteroptera
- Family: Corixidae
- Tribe: Glaenocorisini
- Genus: Dasycorixa
- Species: D. rawsoni

Binomial name
- Dasycorixa rawsoni Hungerford, 1948

Species of true bug

Dasycorixa rawsoni is a species of water boatman in the family Corixidae. It is found in North America.
