= Corisella decolor =

Scientific classification
- Kingdom: Animalia
- Phylum: Arthropoda
- Class: Insecta
- Order: Hemiptera
- Suborder: Heteroptera
- Family: Corixidae
- Subfamily: Corixinae
- Genus: Corisella
- Species: C. decolor

Binomial name
- Corisella decolor (Uhler, 1871)

Species of true bug

Corisella decolor is a species of water boatman in the family Corixidae. It is found in North America.
