= Boatman =

Boatman or boatmen may refer to:

- Boatman (surname)
- Boatman, Oklahoma
- Boatman, Queensland, a locality in the Shire of Murweh
- Boatmen's Bancshares
- Lesser water boatman, a water-dwelling insect
- Water boatman (disambiguation), various species of insect
- Boatman, 1985 Filipino film directed by Tikoy Aguiluz
- Toronto Argonauts, a Canadian football team known colloquially as "The Boatmen"
