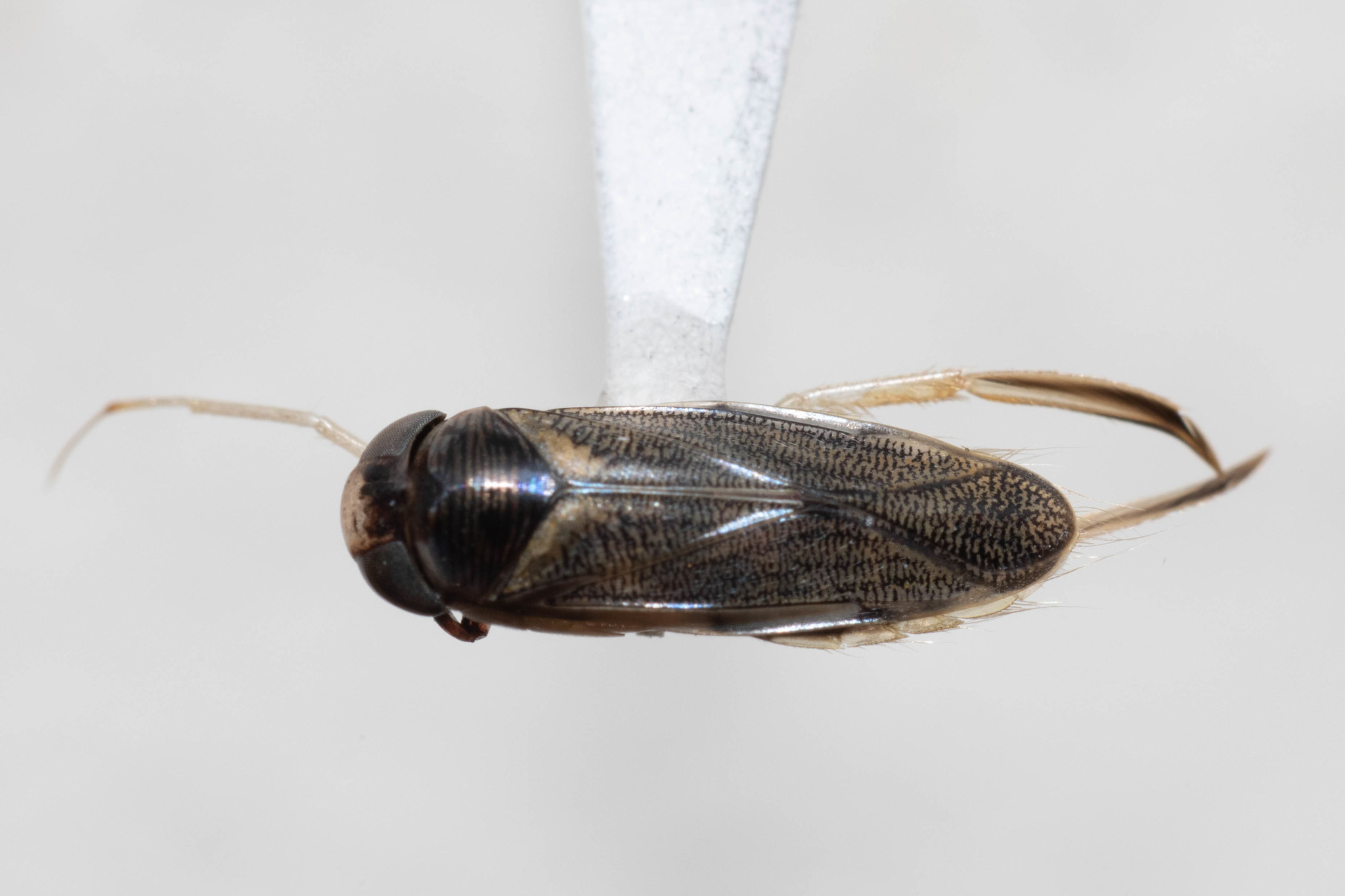

Scientific classification
- Kingdom: Animalia
- Phylum: Arthropoda
- Class: Insecta
- Order: Hemiptera
- Suborder: Heteroptera
- Family: Corixidae
- Genus: Corisella
- Species: C. inscripta

Binomial name
- Corisella inscripta (Uhler, 1894)

= Corisella inscripta =

Species of true bug

Corisella inscripta is a species of water boatman in the family Corixidae. It is found in North America.
