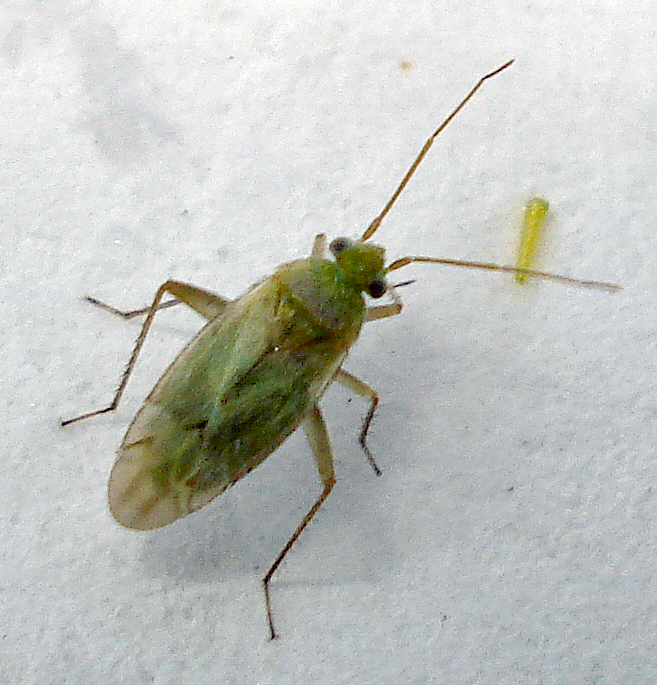

Scientific classification
- Domain: Eukaryota
- Kingdom: Animalia
- Phylum: Arthropoda
- Class: Insecta
- Order: Hemiptera
- Suborder: Heteroptera
- Family: Miridae
- Genus: Asciodema
- Species: A. obsoleta

Binomial name
- Asciodema obsoleta (Fieber, 1864)

= Asciodema obsoleta =

Species of true bug

Asciodema obsoleta is a Palearctic species of true bug.
