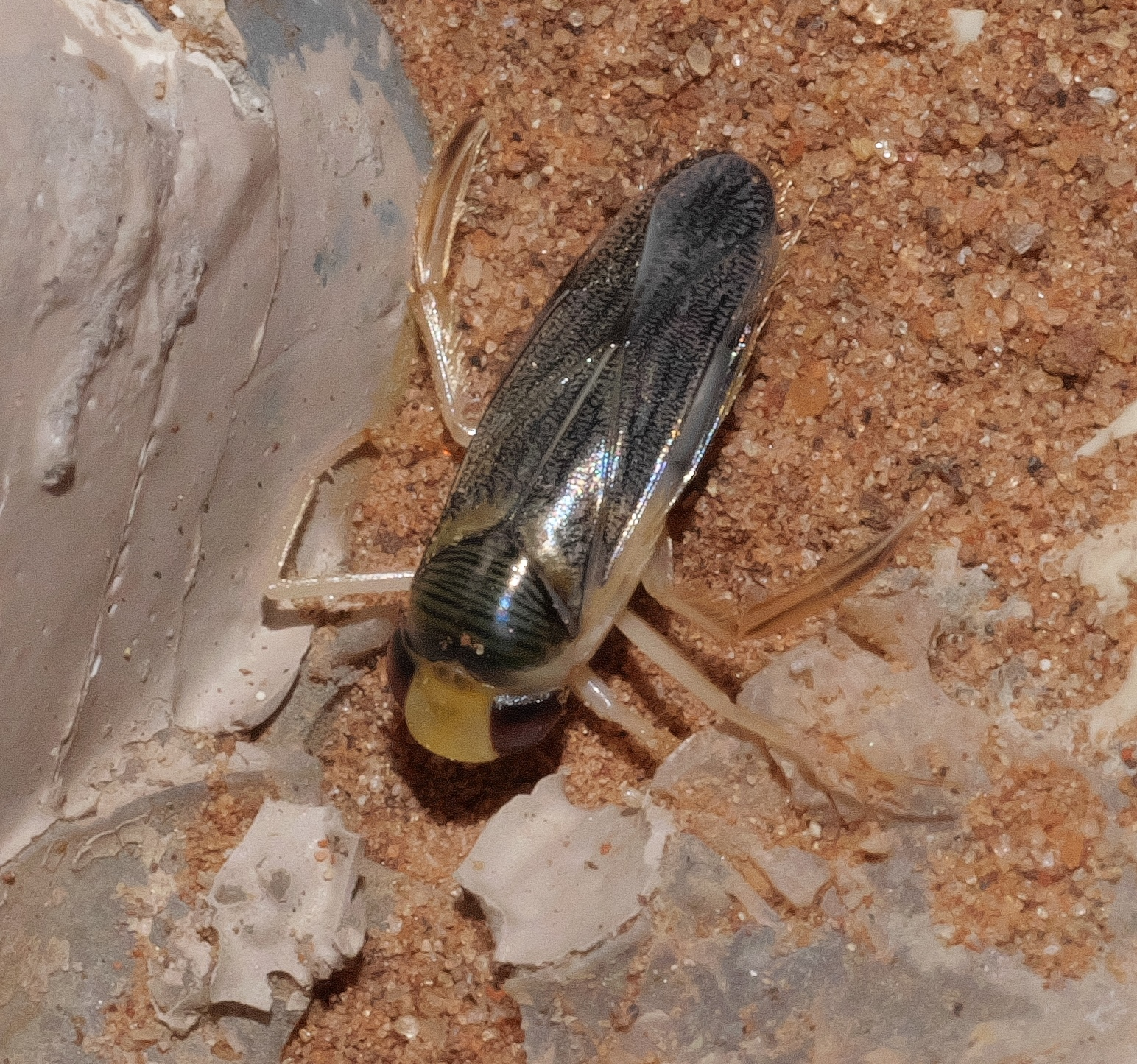
- Corisella edulis, Texas

Scientific classification
- Domain: Eukaryota
- Kingdom: Animalia
- Phylum: Arthropoda
- Class: Insecta
- Order: Hemiptera
- Suborder: Heteroptera
- Family: Corixidae
- Subfamily: Corixinae
- Genus: Corisella
- Species: C. edulis

Binomial name
- Corisella edulis (Champion, 1901)

= Corisella edulis =

Species of water boatman

Corisella edulis is a species of water boatman in the family Corixidae. It is found in Central America and North America.
