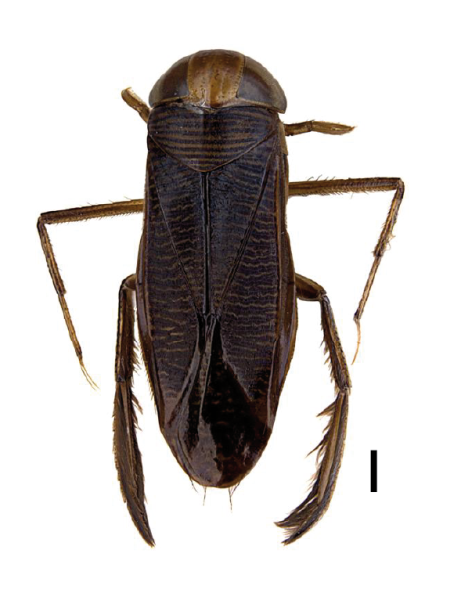
- Scale bar = 1 mm

Scientific classification
- Domain: Eukaryota
- Kingdom: Animalia
- Phylum: Arthropoda
- Class: Insecta
- Order: Hemiptera
- Suborder: Heteroptera
- Family: Corixidae
- Genus: Hesperocorixa
- Species: H. sahlbergi

Binomial name
- Hesperocorixa sahlbergi (Fieber, 1848)

= Hesperocorixa sahlbergi =

Species of true bug

Hesperocorixa sahlbergi is a species of water boatman in the family Corixidae in the order Hemiptera.

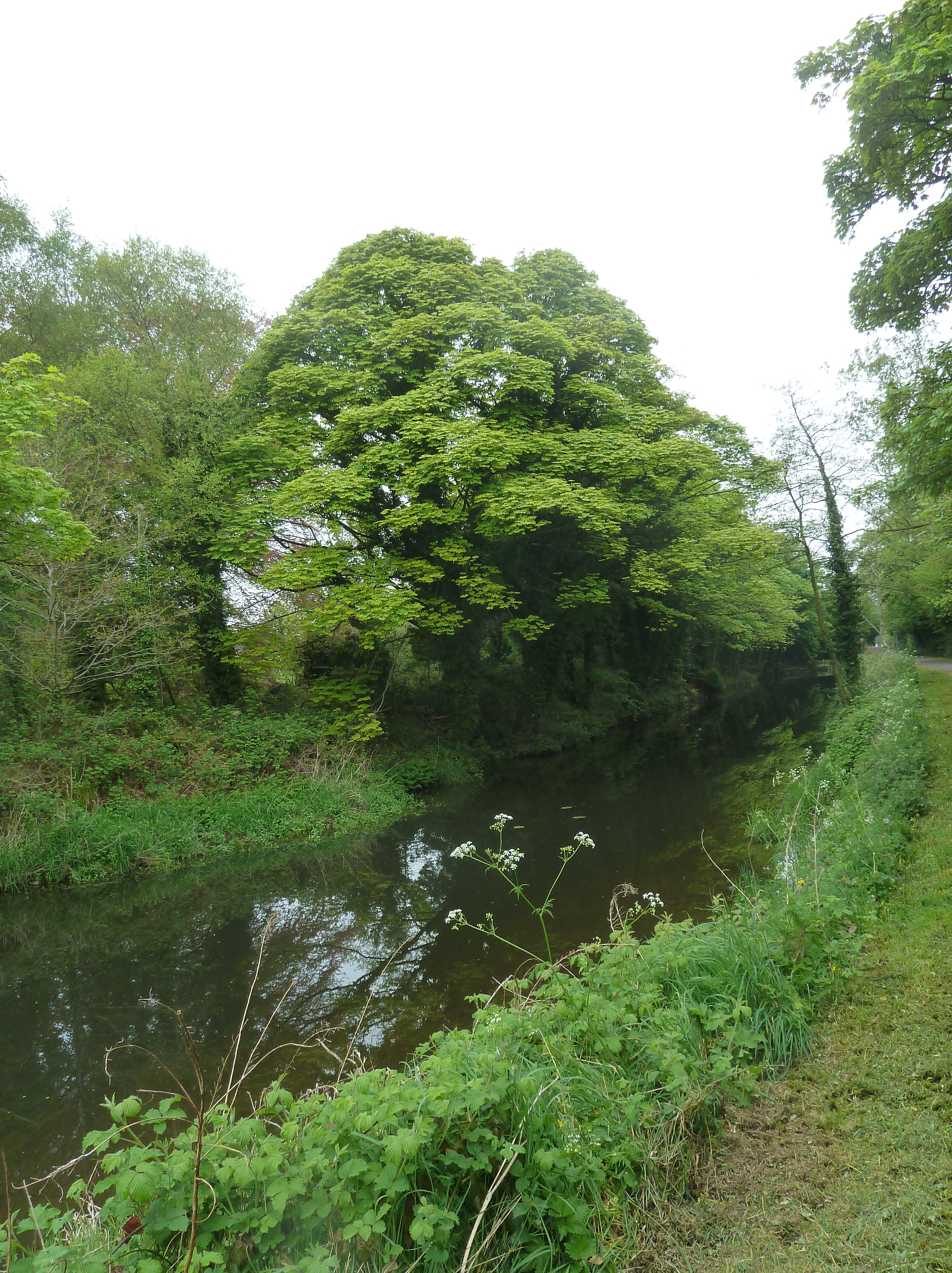
Habitat. Disused canal. Ireland
