= Sigara semistriata =

Scientific classification
- Domain: Eukaryota
- Kingdom: Animalia
- Phylum: Arthropoda
- Class: Insecta
- Order: Hemiptera
- Suborder: Heteroptera
- Family: Corixidae
- Genus: Sigara
- Species: S. semistriata

Binomial name
- Sigara semistriata (Fieber, 1848)

Species of true bug

Sigara semistriata is a species of water boatman in the family Corixidae in the order Hemiptera.
