= Lists of insects of Great Britain =

The following are lists of insects of Great Britain. There are more than 20,000 insects of Great Britain, this page provides lists by order.

== Dragonflies and damselflies (Odonata) ==
- List of Odonata species of Great Britain

== Grasshoppers & crickets (Orthoptera), earwigs (Dermaptera) and cockroaches (Dictyoptera) ==
- List of Orthoptera and allied insects of Great Britain

== Mayflies (Ephemeroptera) ==
- List of mayflies of the British Isles

== Flies (Diptera) ==
- List of conopid fly species of Great Britain
- List of hoverfly species of Great Britain
- List of soldierflies and allies of Great Britain

== Beetles (Coleoptera) ==
- List of beetle species of Great Britain

== Bees, wasps, ants and related insects (Hymenoptera) ==
- List of bees of Great Britain
- List of Parasitica of Great Britain - wasps
- List of ants of Great Britain

== Butterflies and moths (Lepidoptera) ==
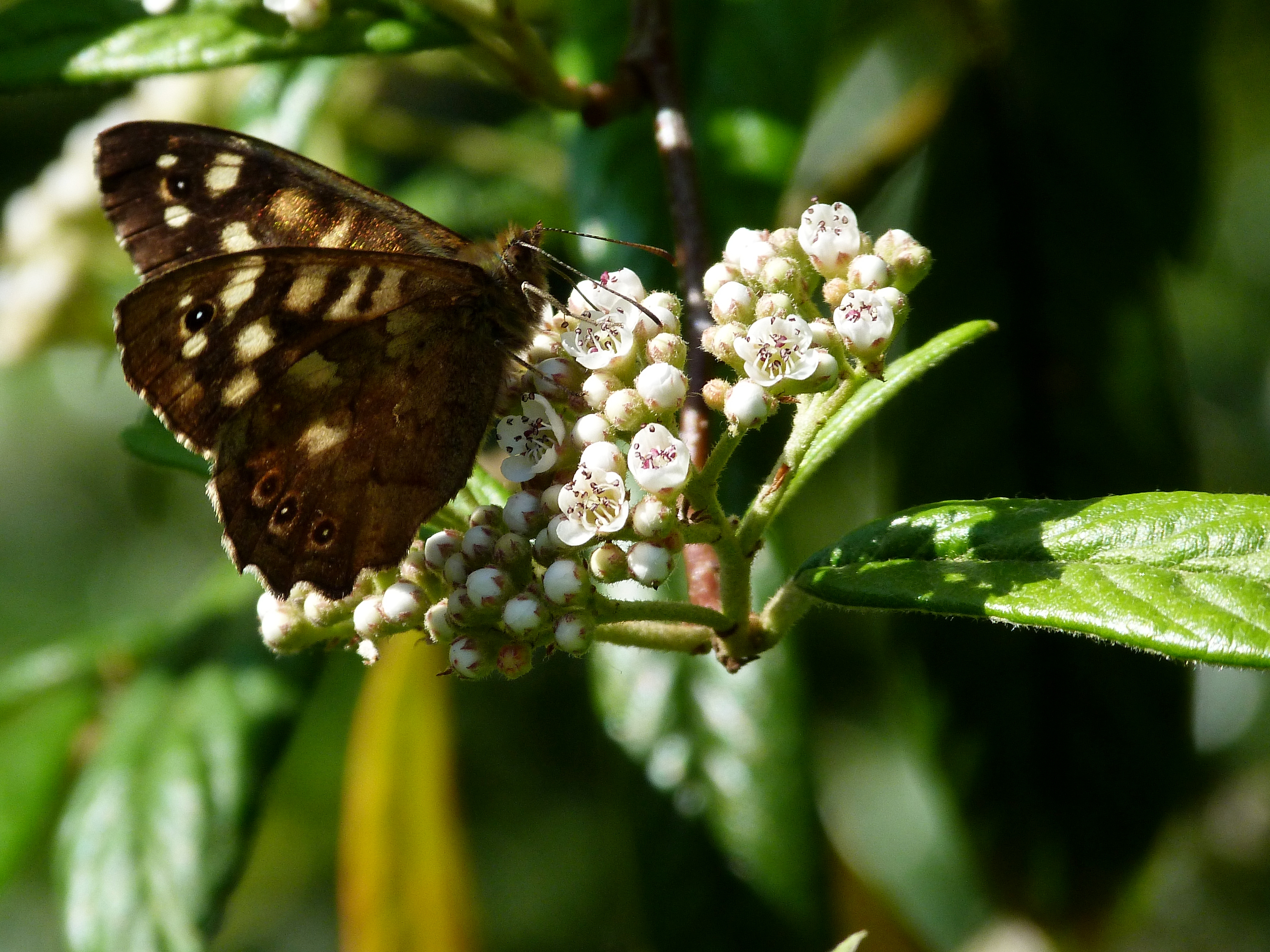
Speckled wood (Pararge aegeria) butterflies are common in Great Britain.

- List of butterflies of Great Britain
- List of moths of Great Britain

== True bugs (Hemiptera) ==
- List of shield bug species of Great Britain
- List of aquatic heteropteran bug species of Great Britain
- List of heteropteran bugs recorded in Britain
