= Cymatia americana =

Scientific classification
- Domain: Eukaryota
- Kingdom: Animalia
- Phylum: Arthropoda
- Class: Insecta
- Order: Hemiptera
- Suborder: Heteroptera
- Family: Corixidae
- Genus: Cymatia
- Species: C. americana

Binomial name
- Cymatia americana Hussey, 1920

Species of true bug

Cymatia americana is a species of water boatman in the family Corixidae. It is found in North America.
