= Sigara limitata =

Scientific classification
- Domain: Eukaryota
- Kingdom: Animalia
- Phylum: Arthropoda
- Class: Insecta
- Order: Hemiptera
- Suborder: Heteroptera
- Family: Corixidae
- Genus: Sigara
- Species: S. limitata

Binomial name
- Sigara limitata (Fieber, 1848)

Species of true bug

Sigara limitata is a species of water boatman in the family Corixidae in the order Hemiptera.
