= Cymatia bonsdorffii =

Scientific classification
- Domain: Eukaryota
- Kingdom: Animalia
- Phylum: Arthropoda
- Class: Insecta
- Order: Hemiptera
- Suborder: Heteroptera
- Family: Corixidae
- Genus: Cymatia
- Species: C. bonsdorffii

Binomial name
- Cymatia bonsdorffii (C. R. Sahlberg, 1819)

Synonyms
- Corixa bonsdorffii C.R.Sahlberg, 1819

Species of true bug

Cymatia bonsdorffii is a species of water boatman in the family Corixidae in the order Hemiptera.

The species honors Finnish naturalist and professor of medicine Gabriel Bonsdorff.
