= Sigara fallenoidea =

Scientific classification
- Kingdom: Animalia
- Phylum: Arthropoda
- Clade: Pancrustacea
- Class: Insecta
- Order: Hemiptera
- Suborder: Heteroptera
- Family: Corixidae
- Genus: Sigara
- Species: S. fallenoidea

Binomial name
- Sigara fallenoidea (Hungerford, 1926)

Species of true bug

Sigara fallenoidea is a species of water boatman in the family Corixidae in the order Hemiptera. It was described by Hungerford with the type locality in Canada. In Ireland, Walton discovered a 'new' species of corixidae which he named Sigara pearcei. This was synonymised by Hungerford in 1950. The distribution of S. fallenoidea is therefore an extraordinary one including Canada, Ireland, Norway, Finland, Sweden, Ukraine and Russia. In Ireland, Sigara fallenoidea is found in all the large lakes on the island. There are confirmed records from Loughs Neagh, Beg and Portmore Lough; Upper and Lower Lough Erne; Lough Melvin; Loughs Ree, Derg and Key on the Shannon; and Lough Corrib.
