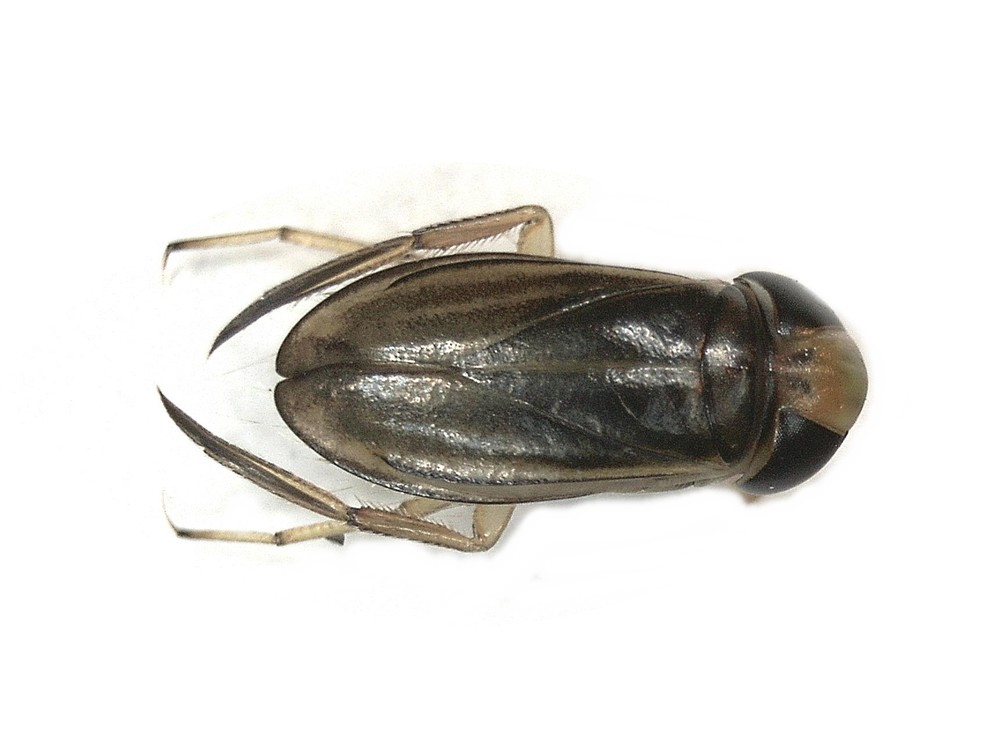

Scientific classification
- Domain: Eukaryota
- Kingdom: Animalia
- Phylum: Arthropoda
- Class: Insecta
- Order: Hemiptera
- Suborder: Heteroptera
- Family: Corixidae
- Genus: Cymatia
- Species: C. coleoptrata

Binomial name
- Cymatia coleoptrata (Fabricius, 1777)

= Cymatia coleoptrata =

Species of true bug

Cymatia coleoptrata is a species of water boatman in the family Corixidae in the order Hemiptera.
