= Glaenocorisa =

Scientific classification
- Domain: Eukaryota
- Kingdom: Animalia
- Phylum: Arthropoda
- Class: Insecta
- Order: Hemiptera
- Suborder: Heteroptera
- Family: Corixidae
- Subfamily: Corixinae
- Tribe: Glaenocorisini
- Genus: Glaenocorisa; Thomson, 1869

Genus of true bugs

Glaenocorisa is a genus of water boatmen in the family Corixidae. There are at least 2 described species in Glaenocorisa.

== Species ==
- Glaenocorisa propinqua (Fieber, 1861)
- Glaenocorisa quadrata Walley, 1930
