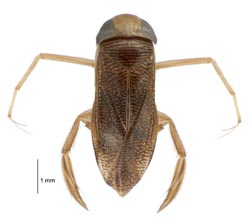

Conservation status
- Not Threatened (NZ TCS)

Scientific classification
- Domain: Eukaryota
- Kingdom: Animalia
- Phylum: Arthropoda
- Class: Insecta
- Order: Hemiptera
- Suborder: Heteroptera
- Family: Corixidae
- Genus: Sigara
- Species: S. arguta

Binomial name
- Sigara arguta (White, 1878)

Synonyms
- Corixa arguta Corixa zealandica Arctocorisa arguta

= Sigara arguta =

Species of true bug

Sigara arguta is a species of water boatman in the family Corixidae. It is endemic to New Zealand.

== Taxonomy ==
This species was first described as Corixa arguta in 1878 by Francis Buchanan White. It was most recently revised in 1948, in which it was moved to the Sigara genus.

== Description ==
Water boatman are stubby insects approximately 8 millimetres (0.31 in) in length. They have a distinctive marble pattern on their wing cases and long legs which assist their movement through the water. Their abdominal hairs are able to capture small air bubbles used to keep them afloat and these can often be seen upon close observation. They swim with their "belly" facing downwards, unlike other common swimming insects. S. arguta mouth parts are covered by a beak-like triangular labium.

S. arguta use their forelegs to scoop up algae and detritus which they then eat.

== Distribution and habitat ==
This species is widespread throughout New Zealand, including on Chatham Island. S. arguta are found across both temporary and permanent freshwater ecosystems. They are typically found in slow-moving bodies of water, such as rivers and streams, lakes, ponds and even man-made pools such as cow troughs.

== Conservation status ==
Under the New Zealand Threat Classification System, this species is listed as "Not Threatened".
