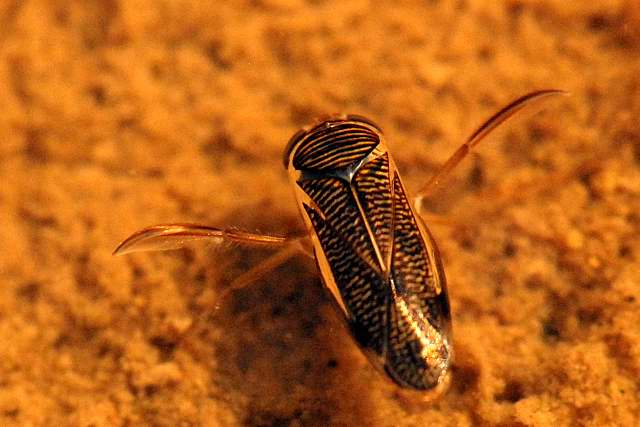
- Hesperocorixa castanea

Scientific classification
- Domain: Eukaryota
- Kingdom: Animalia
- Phylum: Arthropoda
- Class: Insecta
- Order: Hemiptera
- Suborder: Heteroptera
- Family: Corixidae
- Subfamily: Corixinae
- Tribe: Corixini
- Genus: Hesperocorixa; Kirkaldy, 1908

= Hesperocorixa =

Genus of true bugs

Hesperocorixa is a genus of water boatmen in the family Corixidae. There are more than 20 described species in Hesperocorixa.

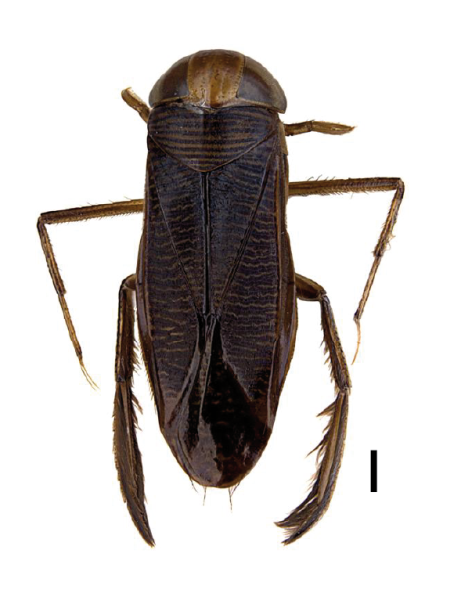
Hesperocorixa sahlbergi

== Species ==
These 29 species belong to the genus Hesperocorixa:

- Hesperocorixa algirica (Puton, 1890)
- Hesperocorixa atopodonta (Hungerford, 1927)
- Hesperocorixa bertrandi Poisson, 1957
- Hesperocorixa brasiliensis
- Hesperocorixa brimleyi (Kirkaldy, 1908)
- Hesperocorixa castanea (Thomson, 1869)
- Hesperocorixa escheri (Heer, 1853)
- Hesperocorixa furtiva (Horváth, 1907)
- Hesperocorixa georgiensis (Egbert, 1946)
- Hesperocorixa harrisi (Uhler, 1878)
- Hesperocorixa interrupta (Say, 1825)
- Hesperocorixa kennicotti (Uhler, 1897)
- Hesperocorixa laevigata (Uhler, 1893)
- Hesperocorixa linnaei (Fieber, 1848)
- Hesperocorixa lobata (Hungerford, 1925)
- Hesperocorixa lucida (Abbott, 1916)
- Hesperocorixa luteola Nieser, 1979
- Hesperocorixa martini (Hungerford, 1928)
- Hesperocorixa michiganensis (Hungerford, 1926)
- Hesperocorixa minor (Abbott, 1913)
- Hesperocorixa minorella (Hungerford, 1926)
- Hesperocorixa moesta (Fieber, 1848)
- Hesperocorixa nitida (Fieber, 1851)
- Hesperocorixa obliqua (Hungerford, 1925)
- Hesperocorixa parallela (Fieber, 1860)
- Hesperocorixa sahlbergi (Fieber, 1848)
- Hesperocorixa scabricula (Walley, 1936)
- Hesperocorixa semilucida (Walley, 1930)
- Hesperocorixa vulgaris (Hungerford, 1925)
