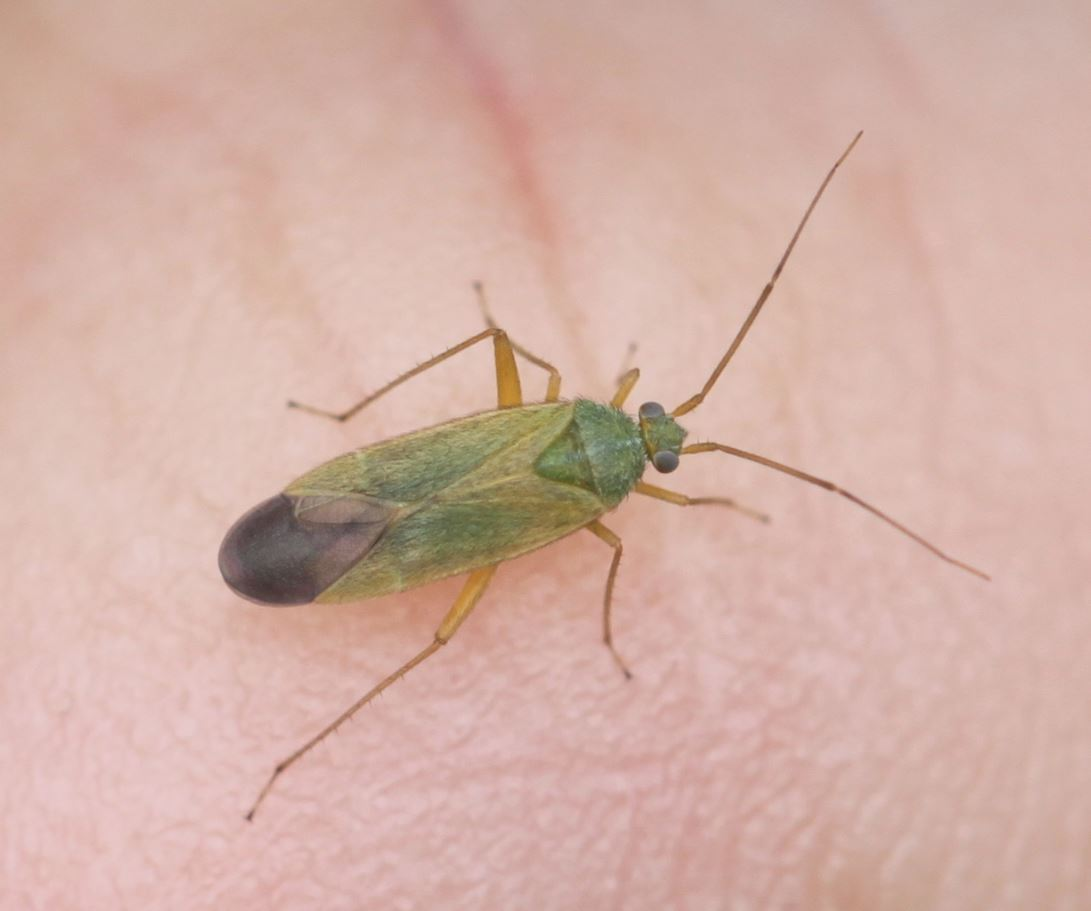
- Asciodema obsoleta

Scientific classification
- Domain: Eukaryota
- Kingdom: Animalia
- Phylum: Arthropoda
- Class: Insecta
- Order: Hemiptera
- Suborder: Heteroptera
- Family: Miridae
- Tribe: Phylini
- Genus: Asciodema; Reuter, 1878

= Asciodema =

Genus of insects

Asciodema is a genus of true bugs belonging to the family Miridae.

The species of this genus are found in Europe.

== Species ==
Species:

- Asciodema obsoleta (Fieber, 1864) (= A. obsoletum)
- Asciodema inconspicua Uhler, 1893 accepted as Brooksetta inconspicua (Uhler, 1893)
