= Ramphocorixa =

Scientific classification
- Domain: Eukaryota
- Kingdom: Animalia
- Phylum: Arthropoda
- Class: Insecta
- Order: Hemiptera
- Suborder: Heteroptera
- Family: Corixidae
- Subfamily: Corixinae
- Tribe: Corixini
- Genus: Ramphocorixa; Abbott, 1912

Genus of true bugs

Ramphocorixa is a genus of water boatmen in the family Corixidae. There are at least two described species in Ramphocorixa.

== Species ==
These two species belong to the genus Ramphocorixa:

- Ramphocorixa acuminata (Uhler, 1897) (acuminate water boatman)
- Ramphocorixa rotundocephala Hungerford, 1927
