= Dasycorixa =

Scientific classification
- Domain: Eukaryota
- Kingdom: Animalia
- Phylum: Arthropoda
- Class: Insecta
- Order: Hemiptera
- Suborder: Heteroptera
- Family: Corixidae
- Subfamily: Corixinae
- Tribe: Glaenocorisini
- Genus: Dasycorixa; Hungerford, 1948

Genus of true bugs

Dasycorixa is a genus of water boatmen in the family Corixidae. There are at least three described species in Dasycorixa.

== Species ==
These three species belong to the genus Dasycorixa:

- Dasycorixa hybrida (Hungerford, 1926)
- Dasycorixa johanseni (Walley, 1931)
- Dasycorixa rawsoni Hungerford, 1948
