= Arctocorisa carinata =

Scientific classification
- Domain: Eukaryota
- Kingdom: Animalia
- Phylum: Arthropoda
- Class: Insecta
- Order: Hemiptera
- Suborder: Heteroptera
- Family: Corixidae
- Genus: Arctocorisa
- Species: A. carinata

Binomial name
- Arctocorisa carinata (C. R. Sahlberg, 1819)

Species of true bug

Arctocorisa carinata is a species of water boatman in the family Corixidae in the order Hemiptera.
