= Glaenocorisa propinqua =

Scientific classification
- Domain: Eukaryota
- Kingdom: Animalia
- Phylum: Arthropoda
- Class: Insecta
- Order: Hemiptera
- Suborder: Heteroptera
- Family: Corixidae
- Genus: Glaenocorisa
- Species: G. propinqua

Binomial name
- Glaenocorisa propinqua (Fieber, 1861)

Species of true bug

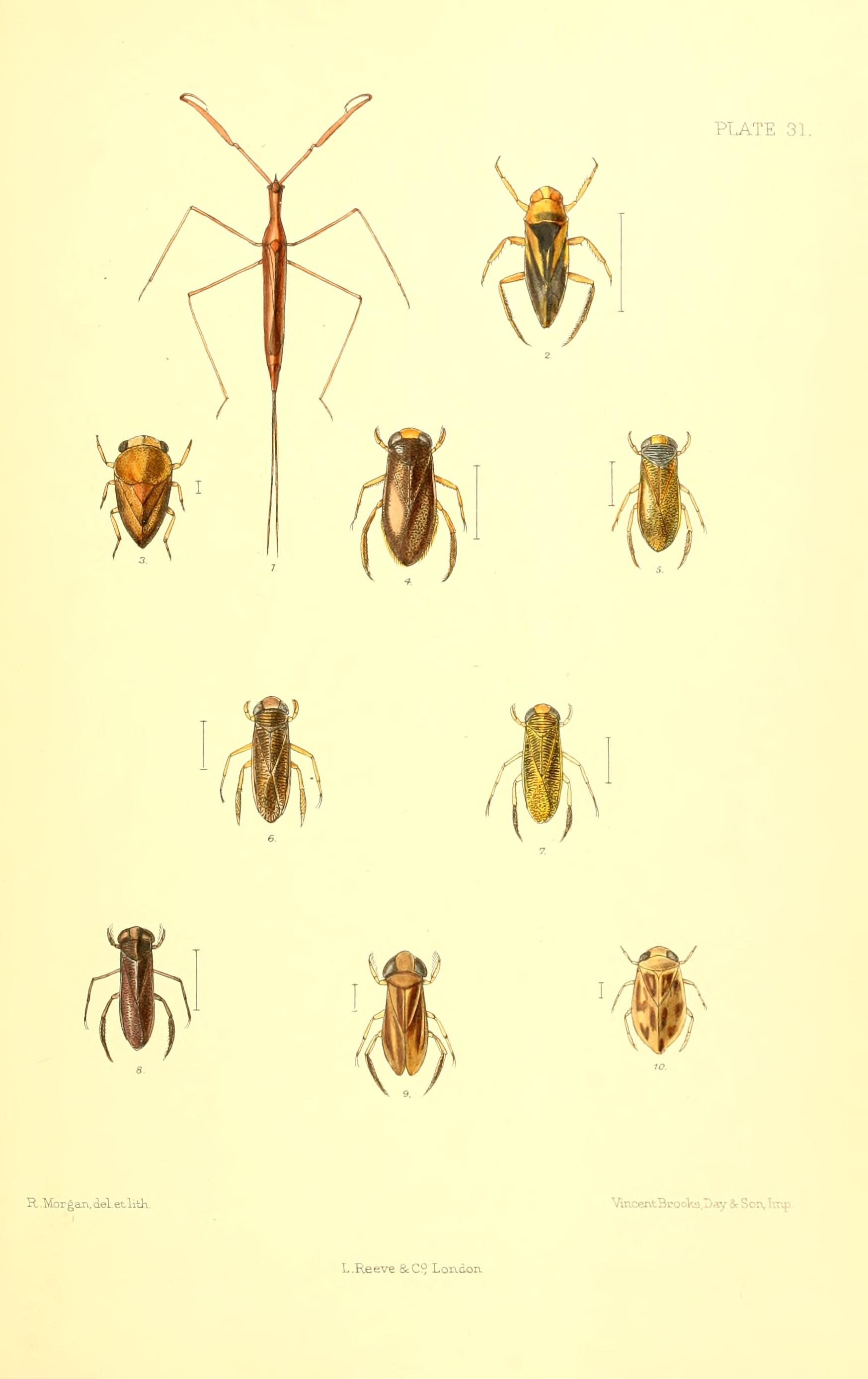

Glaenocorisa propinqua is a species in the family Corixidae ("water boatmen"), in the order Hemiptera ("true bugs, cicadas, hoppers, aphids and allies"). The distribution range of Glaenocorisa propinqua includes Europe, Northern Asia (excluding China), and North America. It can be found in lakes, and its distribution is influenced by the presence of fish, which prey upon the larvae. G. propinqua prey upon Holopedium gibberum.
