= Sigara stagnalis =

Scientific classification
- Domain: Eukaryota
- Kingdom: Animalia
- Phylum: Arthropoda
- Class: Insecta
- Order: Hemiptera
- Suborder: Heteroptera
- Family: Corixidae
- Genus: Sigara
- Species: S. stagnalis

Binomial name
- Sigara stagnalis (Leach, 1817)

Species of true bug

Sigara stagnalis is a species of water boatman in the family Corixidae in the order Hemiptera.
