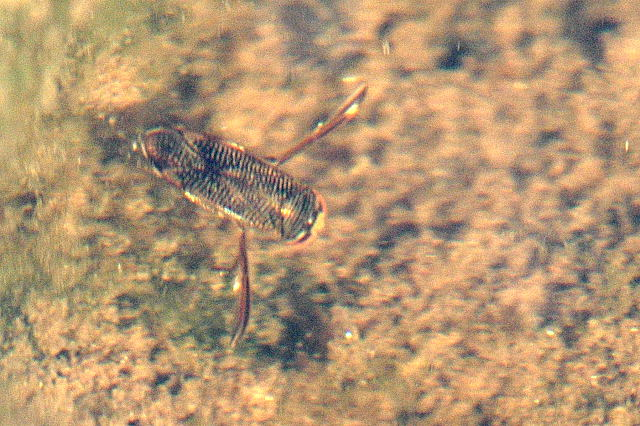

Scientific classification
- Kingdom: Animalia
- Phylum: Arthropoda
- Class: Insecta
- Order: Hemiptera
- Suborder: Heteroptera
- Family: Corixidae
- Genus: Sigara
- Species: S. striata

Binomial name
- Sigara striata (Linnaeus, 1758)

= Sigara striata =

Species of true bug

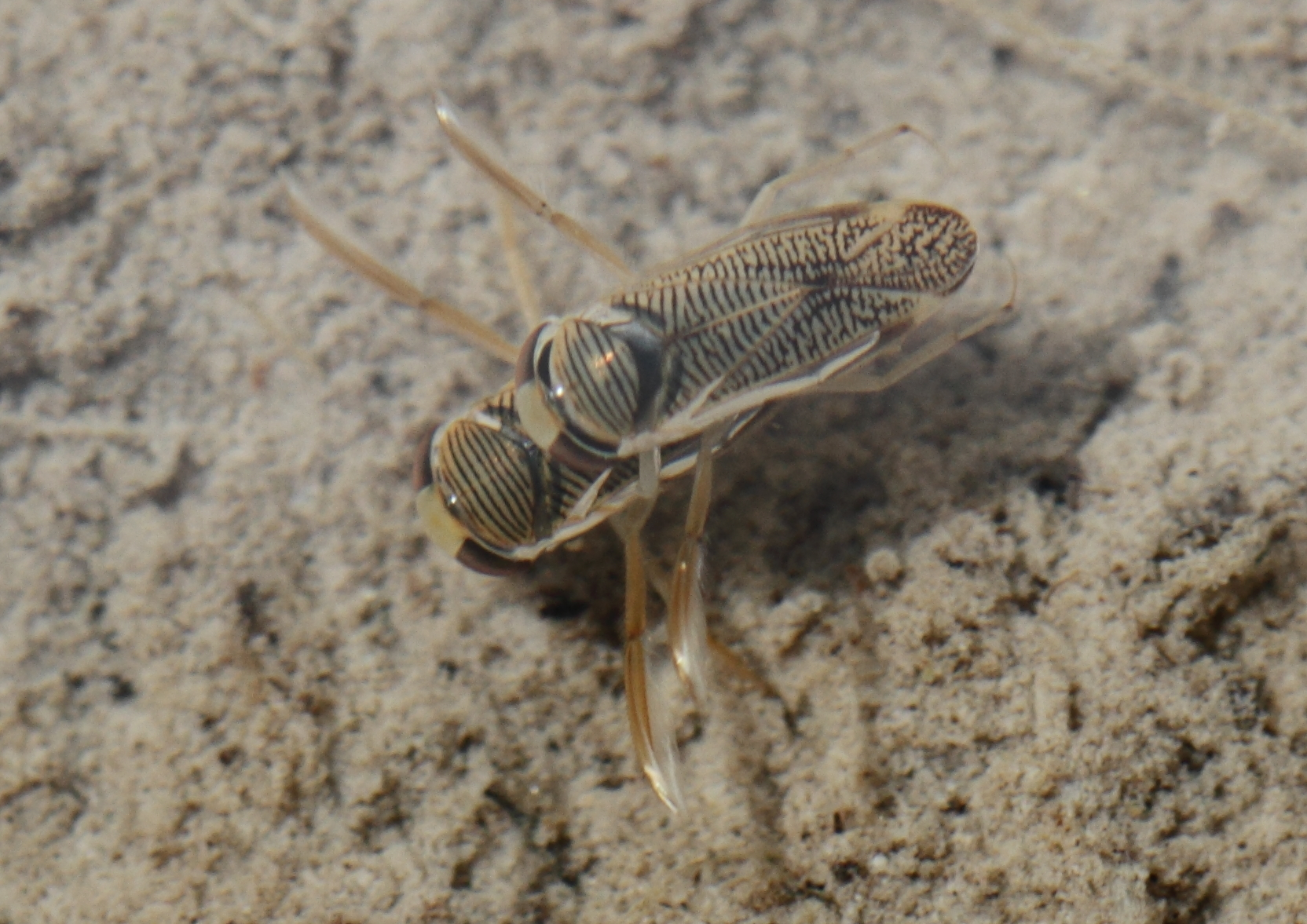

Sigara striata is a species of water boatman in the family Corixidae in the order Hemiptera.

The water boatman emits a nighttime chorus at an acoustic frequency of 4 kHz.
