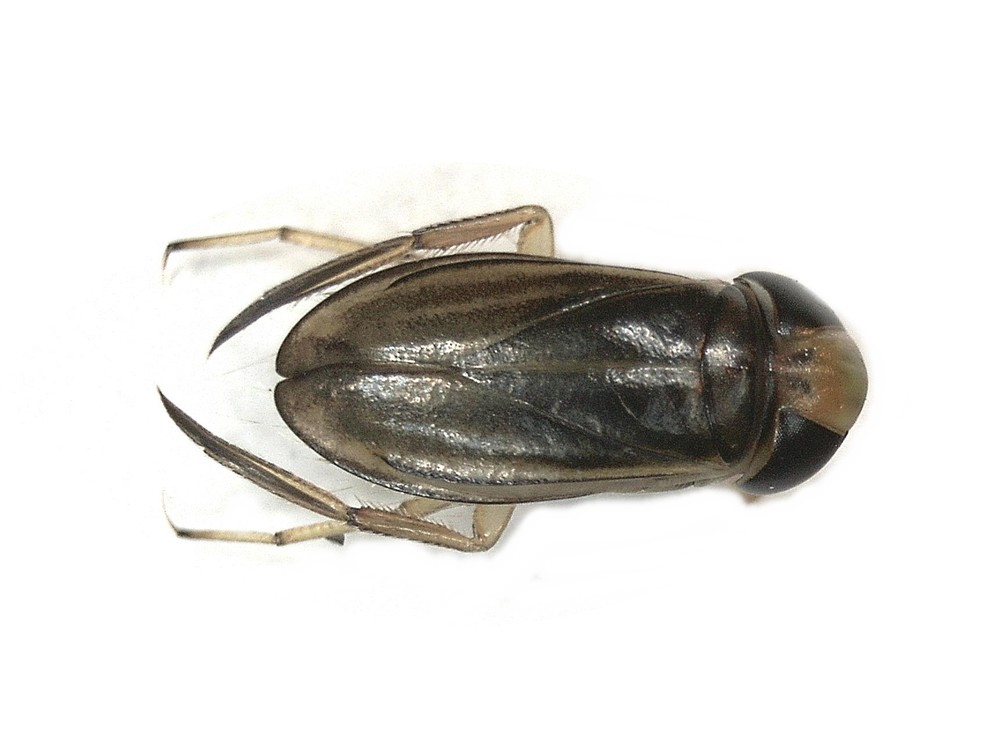
- Cymatia coleoptrata

Scientific classification
- Kingdom: Animalia
- Phylum: Arthropoda
- Class: Insecta
- Order: Hemiptera
- Suborder: Heteroptera
- Family: Corixidae
- Subfamily: Cymatiainae
- Genus: Cymatia; Flor, 1860

= Cymatia =

Genus of true bugs

Cymatia is a genus of water boatmen in the family Corixidae. There are about six described species in Cymatia.

== Species ==
These six species belong to the genus Cymatia:

- Cymatia americana Hussey, 1920
- Cymatia apparens (Distant, 1911)
- Cymatia bonsdorffi (Sahlberg, 1819)
- Cymatia coleoptera (Fabricius, 1777)
- Cymatia coleoptrata (Fabricius, 1777)
- Cymatia rogenhoferi (Fieber, 1848)
