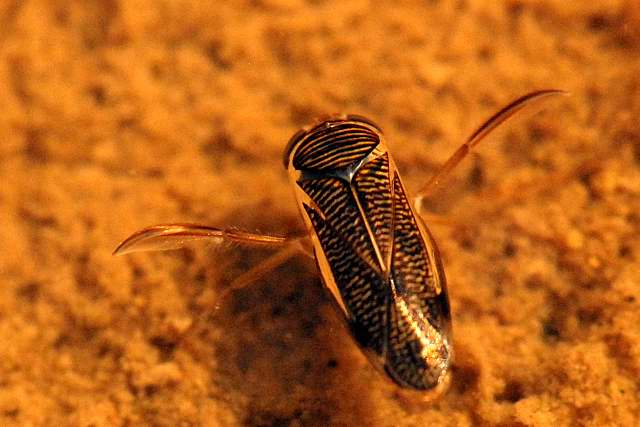

Scientific classification
- Domain: Eukaryota
- Kingdom: Animalia
- Phylum: Arthropoda
- Class: Insecta
- Order: Hemiptera
- Suborder: Heteroptera
- Family: Corixidae
- Genus: Hesperocorixa
- Species: H. castanea

Binomial name
- Hesperocorixa castanea (Thomson, 1869)

= Hesperocorixa castanea =

Species of true bug

Hesperocorixa castanea is a species of water boatman in the family Corixidae in the order Hemiptera.
