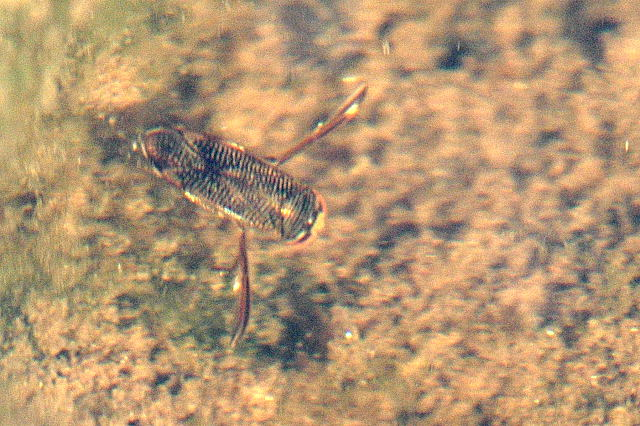
- Sigara striata

Scientific classification
- Kingdom: Animalia
- Phylum: Arthropoda
- Class: Insecta
- Order: Hemiptera
- Suborder: Heteroptera
- Family: Corixidae
- Tribe: Corixini
- Genus: Sigara; Fabricius, 1775

= Sigara =

Genus of true bugs

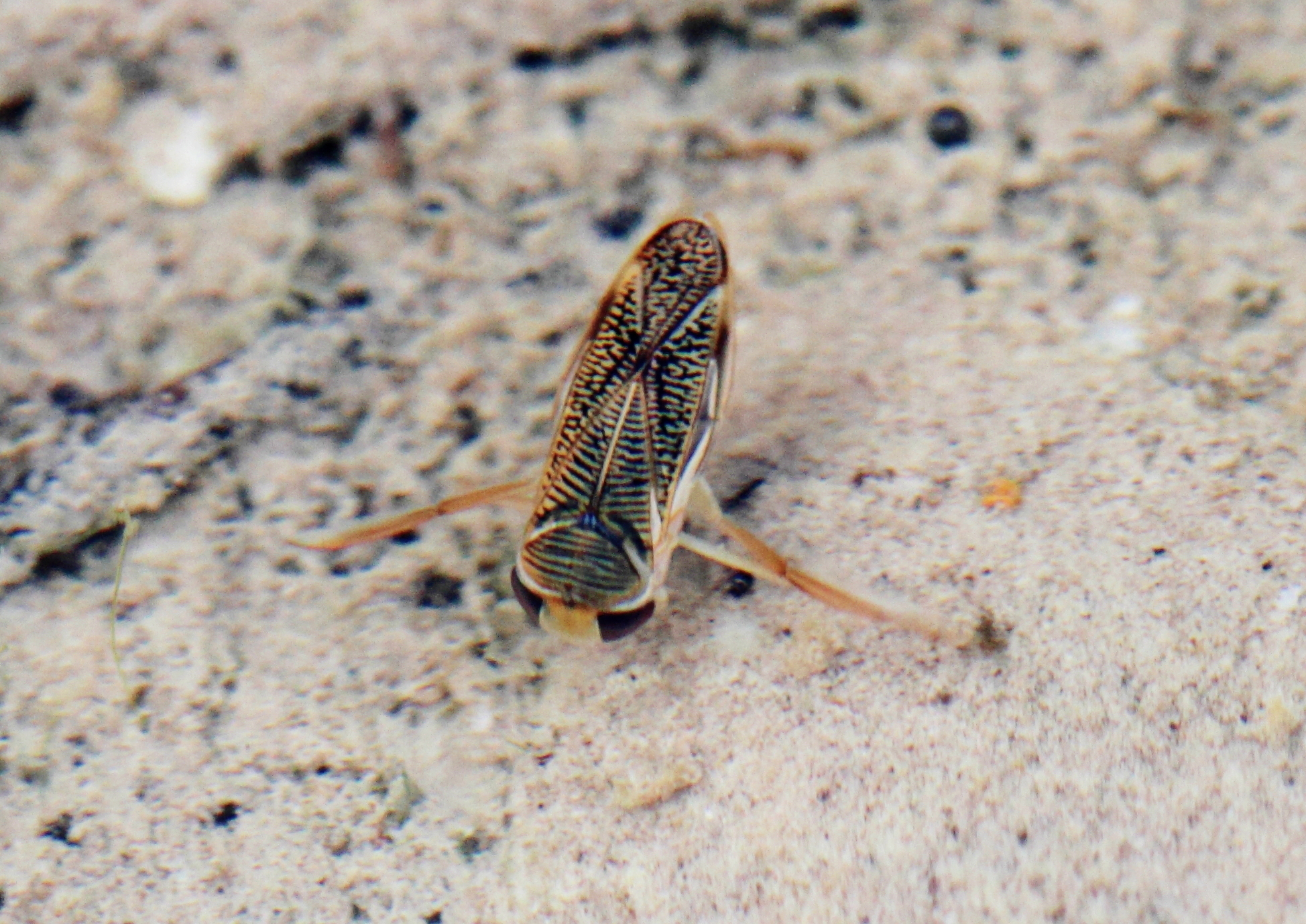
Sigara striata

Sigara is a genus of water boatmen in the family Corixidae. Some species within this genus are halophiles; for example, occurrences of the genus have been noted in the hypersaline Makgadikgadi Pans in Botswana.

== Species ==
These 100 species belong to the genus Sigara:

- Sigara alluaudi (Kirkaldy, 1899)^{g}
- Sigara alternata (Say, 1825)^{i c g b}
- Sigara arguta
- Sigara assimilis (Fieber, 1848)^{g}
- Sigara atomaria Illiger, 1807^{g}
- Sigara basalis (A.Costa, 1843)^{g}
- Sigara bellula (Horváth, 1879)^{g}
- Sigara berneri Hungerford and Hussey, 1957^{i c g}
- Sigara bicoloripennis (Walley, 1936)^{i c g}
- Sigara bradleyi (Abbott, 1913)^{i c g}
- Sigara compressoidea (Hungerford, 1928)^{i c g}
- Sigara conocephala (Hungerford, 1926)^{i c g b}
- Sigara cubiensis Hungerford, 1948^{g}
- Sigara daghestanica Jansson, 1983^{g}
- Sigara decorata (Abbott, 1916)^{i c g}
- Sigara decoratella (Hungerford, 1926)^{i c g}
- Sigara defecta Hungerford, 1948^{i c g}
- Sigara denseconscripta^{g}
- Sigara depressa Hungerford, 1948^{i c g}
- Sigara distincta
- Sigara distorta (Distant, 1911)^{g}
- Sigara dolabra Hungerford and Sailer, 1943^{i c g}
- Sigara dorsalis
- Sigara douglasensis (Hungerford, 1926)^{i c g}
- Sigara falleni (Fieber, 1848)^{g}
- Sigara fallenoidea (Hungerford, 1926)^{i c g}
- Sigara formosana (Matsumura, 1915)^{g}
- Sigara fossarum (Leach, 1817)^{g}
- Sigara gordita (Abbott, 1913)^{i c g}
- Sigara grossolineata Hungerford, 1948^{i c g}
- Sigara hellensii (C.R.Sahlberg, 1819)^{g}
- Sigara hoggarica Poisson, 1929^{g}
- Sigara hubbelli (Hungerford, 1928)^{i c g}
- Sigara hydratotrephes (Kirkaldy, 1908)^{i c g}
- Sigara iactans Jansson, 1983^{g}
- Sigara italica Jaczewski, 1933^{g}
- Sigara janssoni Lucas Castro, 1983^{g}
- Sigara johnstoni Hungerford, 1948^{i c g}
- Sigara knighti Hungerford, 1948^{i c g}
- Sigara krafti Stonedahl, 1984^{i c g}
- Sigara lateralis (Leach, 1817)^{g}
- Sigara lemana Fieber, 1860^{g}
- Sigara limitata (Fieber, 1848)^{g}
- Sigara lineata (Forster, 1771)^{i c g b}
- Sigara longipalis (J.Sahlberg, 1878)^{g}
- Sigara mackinacensis (Hungerford, 1928)^{i c g b}
- Sigara macrocepsoidea Hungerford, 1942^{i c g}
- Sigara macropala (Hungerford, 1926)^{i c g}
- Sigara mathesoni Hungerford, 1948^{i c g}
- Sigara mayri (Fieber, 1860)^{g}
- Sigara mckinstryi Hungerford, 1948^{i c g}
- Sigara meridionalis (Wallengren, 1875)^{g}
- Sigara minuta Fabricius, 1794^{g}
- Sigara mississippiensis Hungerford, 1942^{i c g}
- Sigara modesta (Abbott, 1916)^{i c g}
- Sigara mullettensis (Hungerford, 1928)^{i c g b}
- Sigara nevadensis (Walley, 1936)^{i c g}
- Sigara nigrolineata
- Sigara nigroventralis (Matsumura, 1905)^{g}
- Sigara omani (Hungerford, 1930)^{i c g b}
- Sigara ornata (Abbott, 1916)^{i c g b}
- Sigara paludata Hungerford, 1942^{i c g}
- Sigara pectenata (Abbott, 1913)^{i c g}
- Sigara penniensis (Hungerford, 1928)^{i c g}
- Sigara platensis^{g}
- Sigara quebecensis (Walley, 1930)^{i c g}
- Sigara rubyae^{g}
- Sigara saileri Wilson, 1953^{i c g}
- Sigara salgadoi Lucas Castro, 1983^{g}
- Sigara santiagiensis (Hungerford, 1928)^{g}
- Sigara scabra (Abbott, 1913)^{i c g}
- Sigara schadei Hungerford, 1928^{g}
- Sigara scholtzi Fieber, 1860^{g}
- Sigara scholtzii Scholtz, 1847^{g}
- Sigara scotti (Douglas & Scott, 1868)^{g}
- Sigara scripta (Rambur, 1840)^{g}
- Sigara selecta (Fieber, 1848)^{g}
- Sigara semistriata (Fieber, 1848)^{g}
- Sigara septemlineata (Paiva, 1918)^{g}
- Sigara servadeii Tamanini, 1965^{g}
- Sigara sigmoidea (Abbott, 1913)^{i c g}
- Sigara signata (Fieber, 1851)^{i c g}
- Sigara solensis (Hungerford, 1926)^{i c g}
- Sigara stagnalis (Leach, 1817)^{g}
- Sigara stigmatica (Fieber, 1851)^{i c g}
- Sigara striata (Linnaeus, 1758)^{i c g}
- Sigara tadeuszi Lundblad, 1933^{g}
- Sigara takahashii Hungerford, 1940^{g}
- Sigara transfigurata (Walley, 1930)^{i c g}
- Sigara trilineata (Provancher, 1872)^{i c g b}
- Sigara truncatipala (Hale, 1922)^{g}
- Sigara tucma^{g}
- Sigara vallis Lauck, 1966^{i c g}
- Sigara vandykei Hungerford, 1948^{i c g}
- Sigara variabilis (Hungerford, 1926)^{i c g}
- Sigara venusta (Douglas & Scott, 1869)^{g}
- Sigara virginiensis Hungerford, 1948^{i c g b}
- Sigara washingtonensis Hungerford, 1948^{i c g b}
- Sigara yala^{g}
- Sigara zimmermanni (Fieber, 1851)^{i c g}

Data sources: i = ITIS, c = Catalogue of Life, g = GBIF, b = Bugguide.net

== See also ==
- Extremophile
