= Herbert Barker Hungerford =

American entomologist

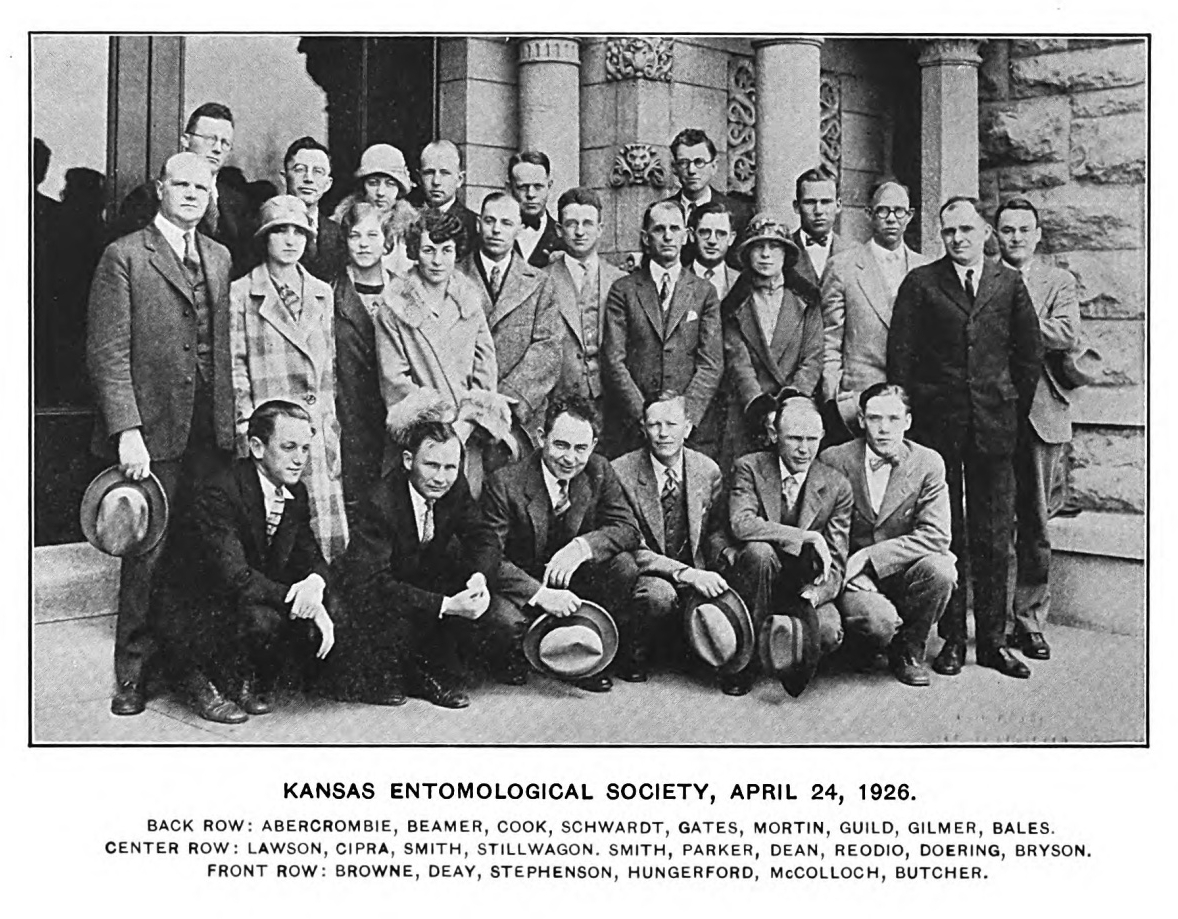
Kansas Entomological Society, 1926. Hungerford squatting fourth from left

Herbert Barker Hungerford (30 August 1885 – 13 May 1963) was an American entomologist and professor at the University of Kansas who specialized in the taxonomy, systematics and ecology of aquatic bugs in the families Corixidae and Notonectidae.

Hungerford was born in Mahaska, Kansas to Artemus Manwarring and Bertha Estelle Hungerford (born Barker). He went to the Kansas State Normal School at Emporia receiving an A.B. degree in 1911 and an A.M. in 1913. He was a teacher at the University of Kansas from 1911 and received a Ph.D. from Cornell University in 1918. In 1928 he visited Europe, examining the type specimens of water bugs at various collections. He became a head of the department of entomology in 1924 and was also posted as the State Entomologist for Kansas. During his lifetime he made extensive collections of the aquatic bugs and published numerous descriptions and research papers in entomology. He is buried at Oak Hill Cemetery in Lawrence, Kansas.

Hungerford married Mary Frances Kenney, a friend from college, in 1905 and they had a daughter.
