= Corisella =

Scientific classification
- Domain: Eukaryota
- Kingdom: Animalia
- Phylum: Arthropoda
- Class: Insecta
- Order: Hemiptera
- Suborder: Heteroptera
- Family: Corixidae
- Subfamily: Corixinae
- Genus: Corisella; Lundblad, 1928

Genus of true bugs

Corisella is a genus of water boatmen in the family Corixidae. There are about 5 described species in Corisella.

== Species ==
- Corisella decolor (Uhler, 1871)
- Corisella edulis (Champion, 1901)
- Corisella inscripta (Uhler, 1894)
- Corisella mercenaria (Say, 1832)
- Corisella tarsalis (Fieber, 1851)
