= Arctocorisa =

Scientific classification
- Kingdom: Animalia
- Phylum: Arthropoda
- Clade: Pancrustacea
- Class: Insecta
- Order: Hemiptera
- Suborder: Heteroptera
- Family: Corixidae
- Genus: Arctocorisa; Wallengren, 1894

Genus of true bugs

Arctocorisa is a genus of true bugs belonging to the family Corixidae. They are found mainly in Europe and North America.

== Species ==
Sources:

- Arctocorisa carinata (C. Sahlberg, 1819)
- Arctocorisa chanceae (Hungerford, 1926)
- Arctocorisa chinana (Hutchinson, 1928)
- Arctocorisa convexa (Fieber, 1851)
- Arctocorisa germari (Fieber, 1848)
- Arctocorisa kurilensis (Jansson, 1979)
- Arctocorisa lawsoni (Hungerford, 1948)
- Arctocorisa planifrons (Kirby, 1837)
- Arctocorisa sutilis (Uhler, 1876)
