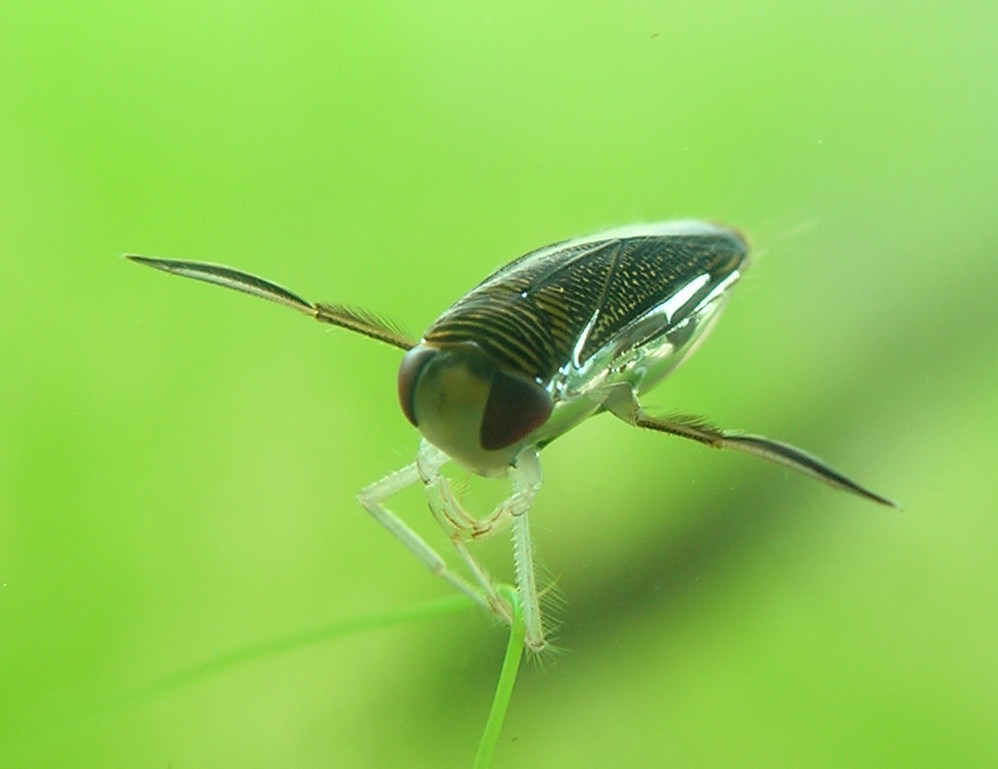

Scientific classification
- Domain: Eukaryota
- Kingdom: Animalia
- Phylum: Arthropoda
- Class: Insecta
- Order: Hemiptera
- Suborder: Heteroptera
- Family: Corixidae
- Genus: Corixa
- Species: C. punctata

Binomial name
- Corixa punctata (Illiger, 1807)

= Lesser water boatman =

Species of true bug

The lesser waterboatman or lesser water boatman (Corixa punctata) is a freshwater-dwelling insect of the order Hemiptera.

Adults normally range in size from 5 to 15 mm long, and are found in ponds, lakes, swimming pools and most bodies of freshwater. The boatman feeds on algae and dead plant material. They are green with long hind legs which they use to swim on top of water. These powerful legs are covered in tiny hairs which helps them float on the surface of the water. They also have wings which enable them to fly and reach suitable environments.

They breathe oxygen by trapping air beneath their wing cases when they are on the surface as the oxygen is trapped by tiny hairs. They use trapped air in their physical gill to convert water-borne sounds into airborne sounds that they can hear.

They are similar in appearance to Notonecta glauca, the back swimmer, but lesser waterboatmen are herbivores and swim on their fronts. They are not related to Notonecta glauca nor to the European Micronecta scholtzi, also known as the "lesser water boatman".
