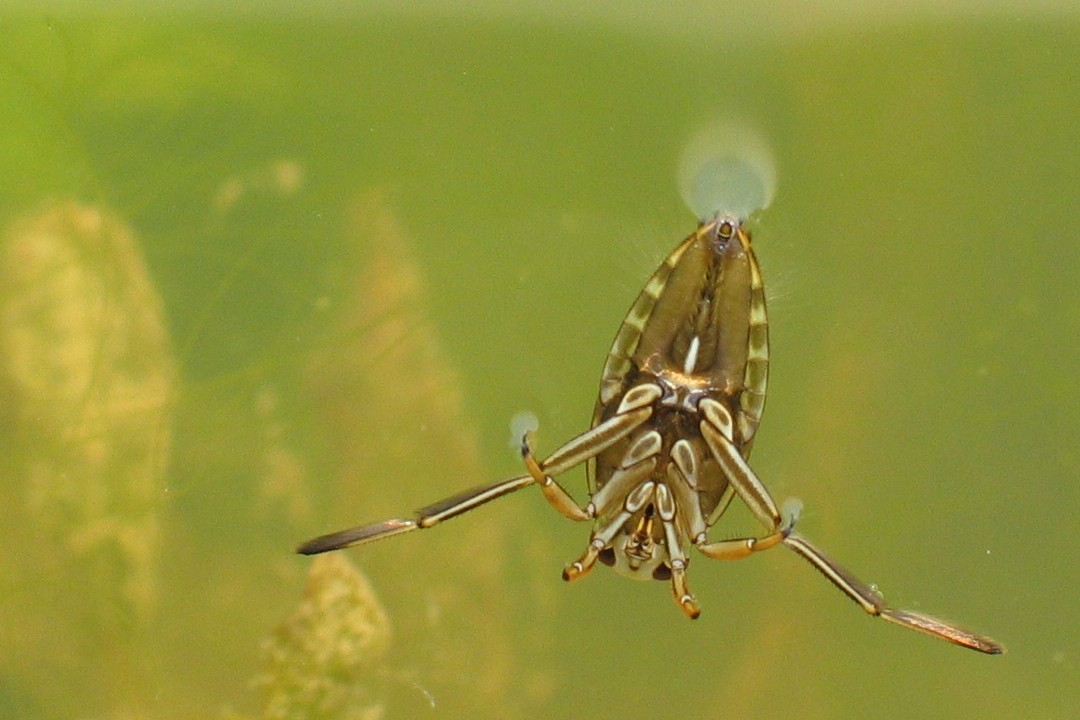

Scientific classification
- Kingdom: Animalia
- Phylum: Arthropoda
- Clade: Pancrustacea
- Class: Insecta
- Order: Hemiptera
- Suborder: Heteroptera
- Family: Notonectidae
- Genus: Notonecta
- Species: N. glauca

Binomial name
- Notonecta glauca (Linnaeus, 1758)

= Notonecta glauca =

Species of true bug

Notonecta glauca, also known as the greater water-boatman or common backswimmer, is a species of aquatic insect in the family Notonectidae. This species is found in large parts of Europe, North Africa, and east through Asia to Siberia and China. In much of its range it is the most common backswimmer species. It is also the most widespread and abundant of the four British water-boatmen. Notonecta glauca are Hemiptera (true bug) predators, that are approximately 13–16 mm in length. Females have a larger body size compared to males. These water insects swim and rest on their back (hence their common name "backswimmer" or "water boatman") and are found under the water surface. Notonecta glauca supports itself under the water surface by using their front legs and mid legs and the back end of its abdomen and rest them on the water surface; They are able to stay under the water surface by water tension, also known as the air-water interface (surface tension). They use the hind legs as oars; these legs are fringed with hair and, when at rest, are extended laterally like a pair of sculls in a boat. Notonecta glauca will either wait for its prey to pass by or will swim and actively hunt its prey. When the weather is warm, usually in the late summer and autumn, they will fly between ponds. Notonecta glauca reproduce in the spring.

== Eye ==
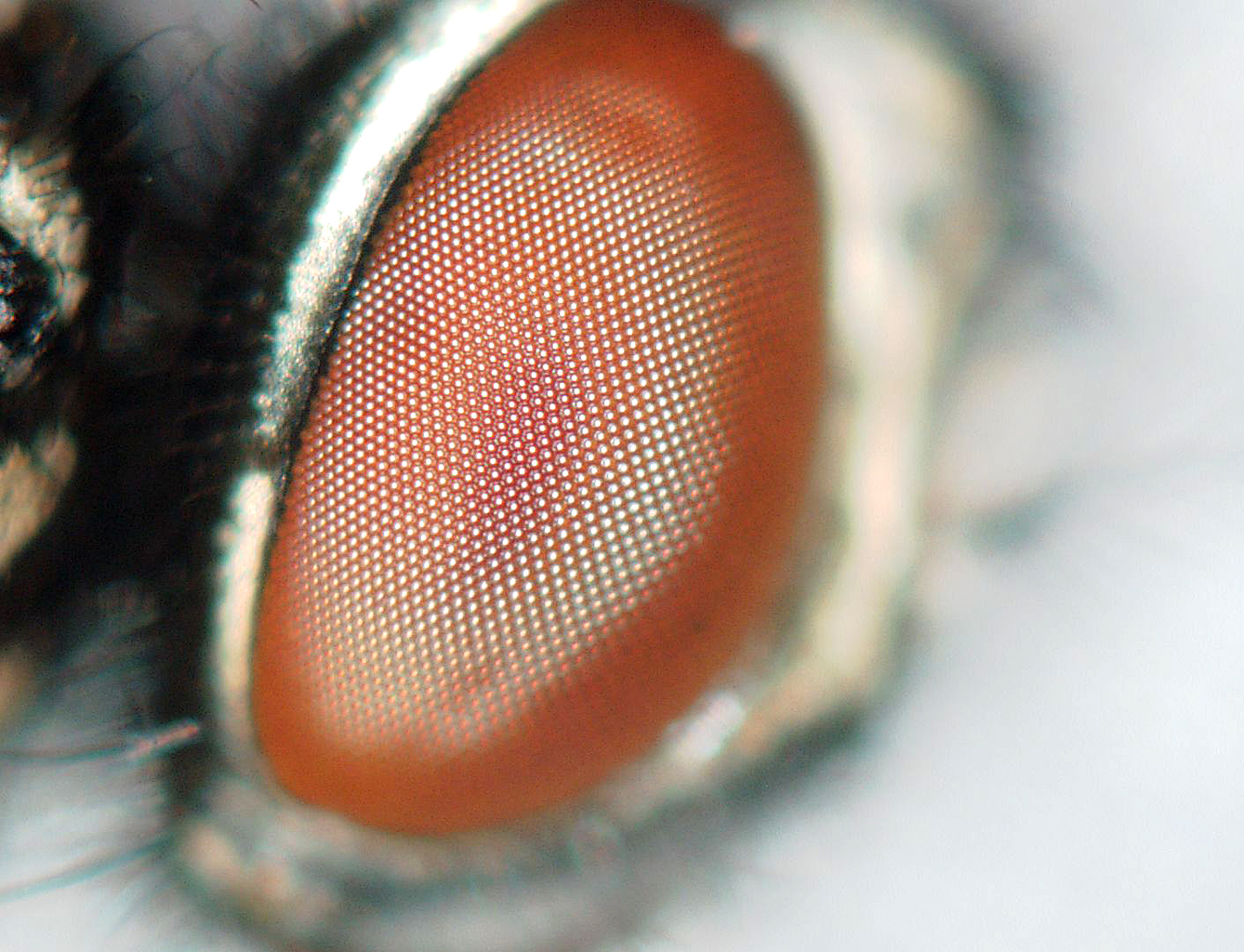
Compound eye

There has been a great deal of research on the eye of N. glauca. These insects use their eyes for both day and night vision, which is used for prey capture and flight when searching for new habitats. Notonecta glauca, like other insects, have a compound eye. Specifically, their eye is an acone-type with corneal structure, which helps them create a sharp image when both in the water and in the air. The acone is the site of the pupil. Immonen et al. (2014), found that backswimmers are able to see in both day and night light conditions because of:

- their large variations in the peripheral photoreceptor cell properties
- having a robust migration of pigment and photoreceptors

They also found that the green-sensitive peripheral photoreceptors function in a similar way as nocturnal Phasmatodea (or stick insects). To protect their eye from direct sunlight during the day, the pigment cell's diaphragm are condensed, and during the night they open fully to allow as much light in as possible. Notonecta glauca have two photoreceptor subsystems:

1. Large and most sensitive peripheral photoreceptors
2. Smaller peripheral and central photoreceptors

The first subsystem is sensitive to green light, one of the colours in the visible spectrum. This sensitivity helps the backswimmer see in dimmer light or at night. The second subsystem allows the backswimmer to see in bright light and when in flight. Notonecta glauca pupil (acone) take a different amount of time to adjust to light. It takes the N. glauca approximately 40 minutes for the pupil to adjust to daylight and approximately 50 minutes to adjust to the light at night.

== Air retention ==
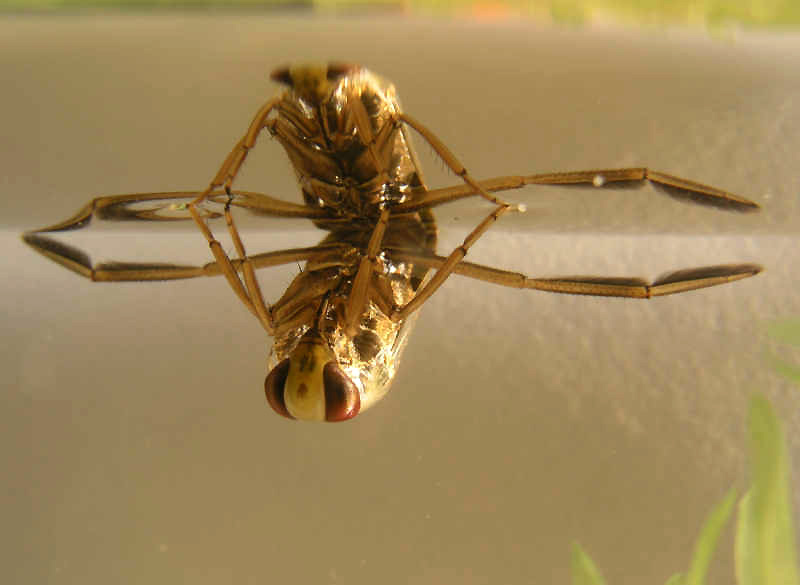
Notonecta glauca

Although N. glauca live in the water, they breathe atmospheric air and do not have gills. When these insects are diving or resting under the water surface, they create a film of air that surrounds their body. This air film is supported by a superhydrophobic coating or surface which prevents the insect from becoming wet. It also reduces the drag (physics) that is created when diving. To be able to create this air film around it, N. glauca is covered in hairy structures, except on its head and legs. There are two types of hairs and air retention is maximized by having both types: setae and microtrichia. The most important part in creating an air film is the density of the hairs. Notonecta glauca has dense microtrichia and their air film can last up to 120 days. The air film cannot last forever because as an insect respires (breathes), the oxygen partial pressure will decrease and nitrogen partial pressure will increase, causing the air bubble to decrease in size.

=== Model organism ===
Notonecta glauca is used as a model organism for friction reduction and air retention. Possible applications for this include reduction of drag in ships.

== Wave discrimination ==
Notonecta glauca can discriminate between prey and non-prey, like other backswimmers, by surface waves. Lang (1979), completed an experiment that showed that waves that were created by other backswimmers swimming, emerging, turning and paddling were of a lower frequency (below 40 Hz) compared to waves created by their prey items, who had a frequency between 70–140 Hz. Larval backswimmers were found to create different waves that differed from adult backswimmers, but their frequency were similar to that of adult swimming produced waves (up to 70 Hz).

== Foraging behaviour ==
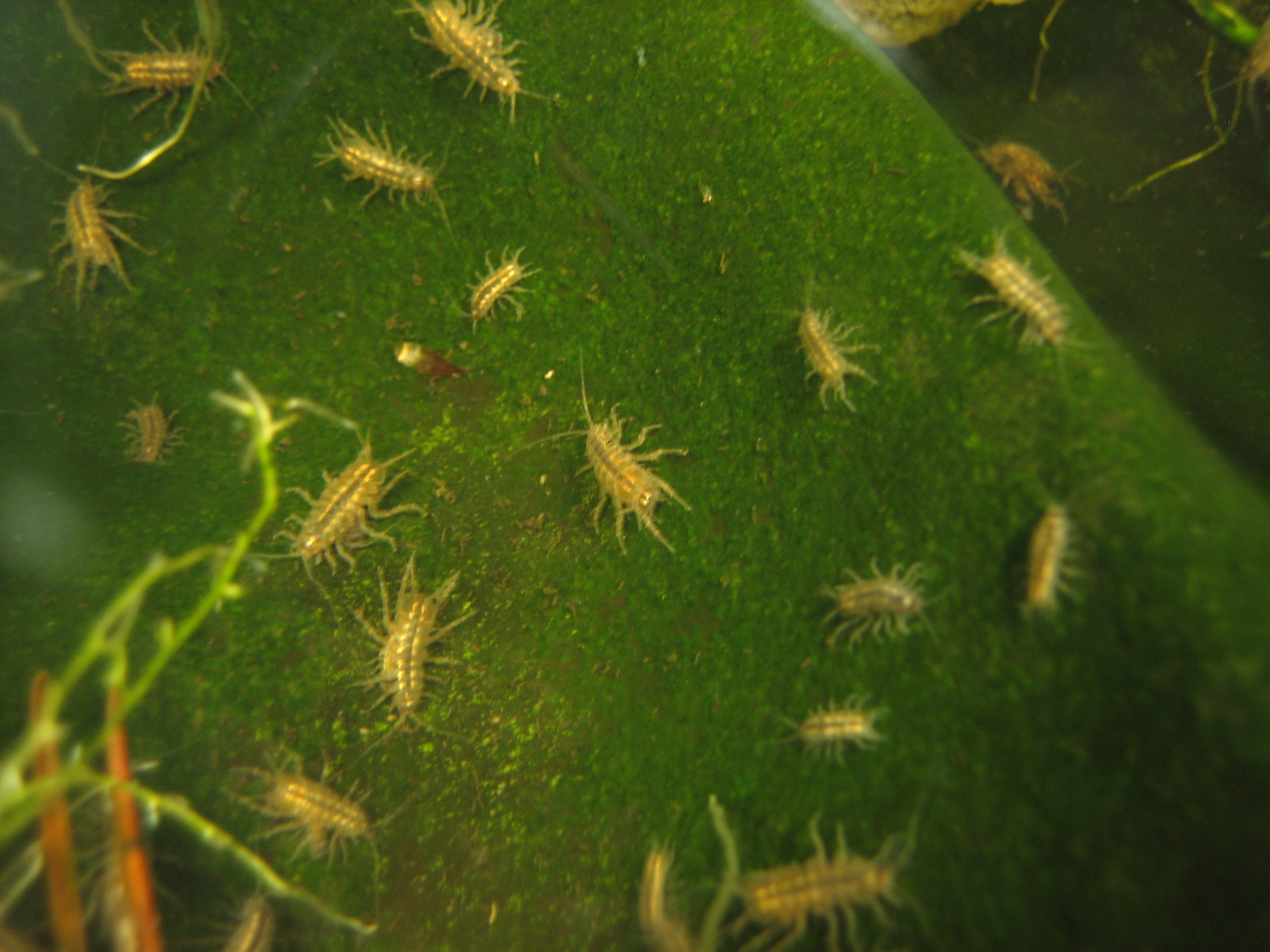
Asellus aquaticus

Water depth can affect how N. glauca pick which prey they eat. Males and females both spend a lot of time on the surface of the water where they encounter mosquito (Culex) larvae. They feed on this prey because there is a decrease in travel cost (having to dive for them) and Culex gives a higher energy rate.

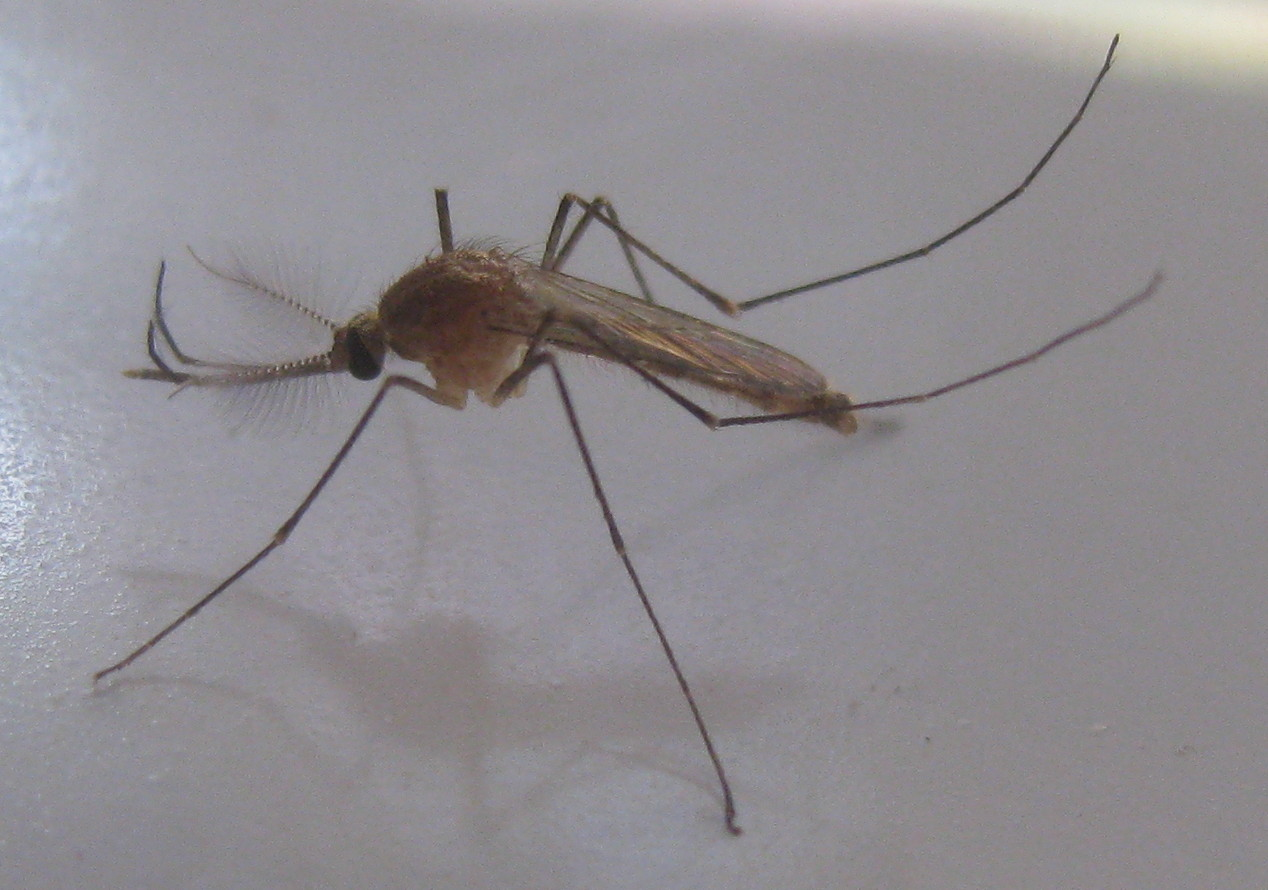
Adult Culex mosquito

Mature females, however, will also dive to the bottom of the pond to feed on isopods (Asellus), but only in shallow waters. Reaching Asellus requires a higher travel cost of energy. This behaviour is not consistent with the optimal foraging theory. It is possible, however, that because mature females are larger than males and immature females, they have a reduced buoyancy and therefore require less energy to capture Asellus. Also, mature females have a larger abdominal size, which could support a larger air bubble and allow them to remain submerged for longer. However, if the water depth increases, mature females will switch and spend more time at the surface and not feed on Asellus, as the deep water increases the amount of energy needed for diving and staying submerged.

The oxygen concentration in the body of water can affect the choice of prey N. glauca pick, as Cockrell (1984) found that when oxygen was at a high dissolved level, N. glauca will spend more time submerged and attacking Asellus.

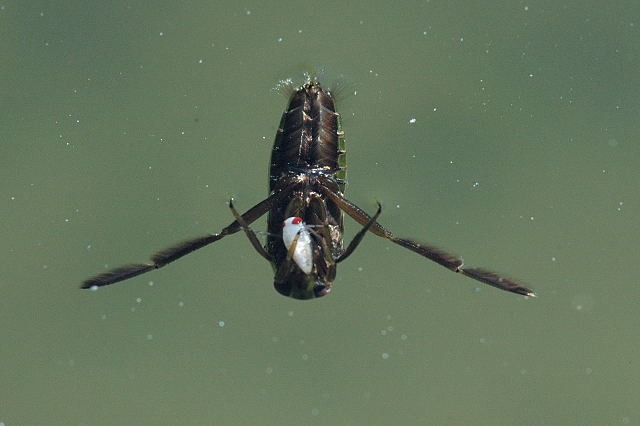
Notonecta glauca feeding
