= Franz Xaver Fieber =

German botanist and entomologist

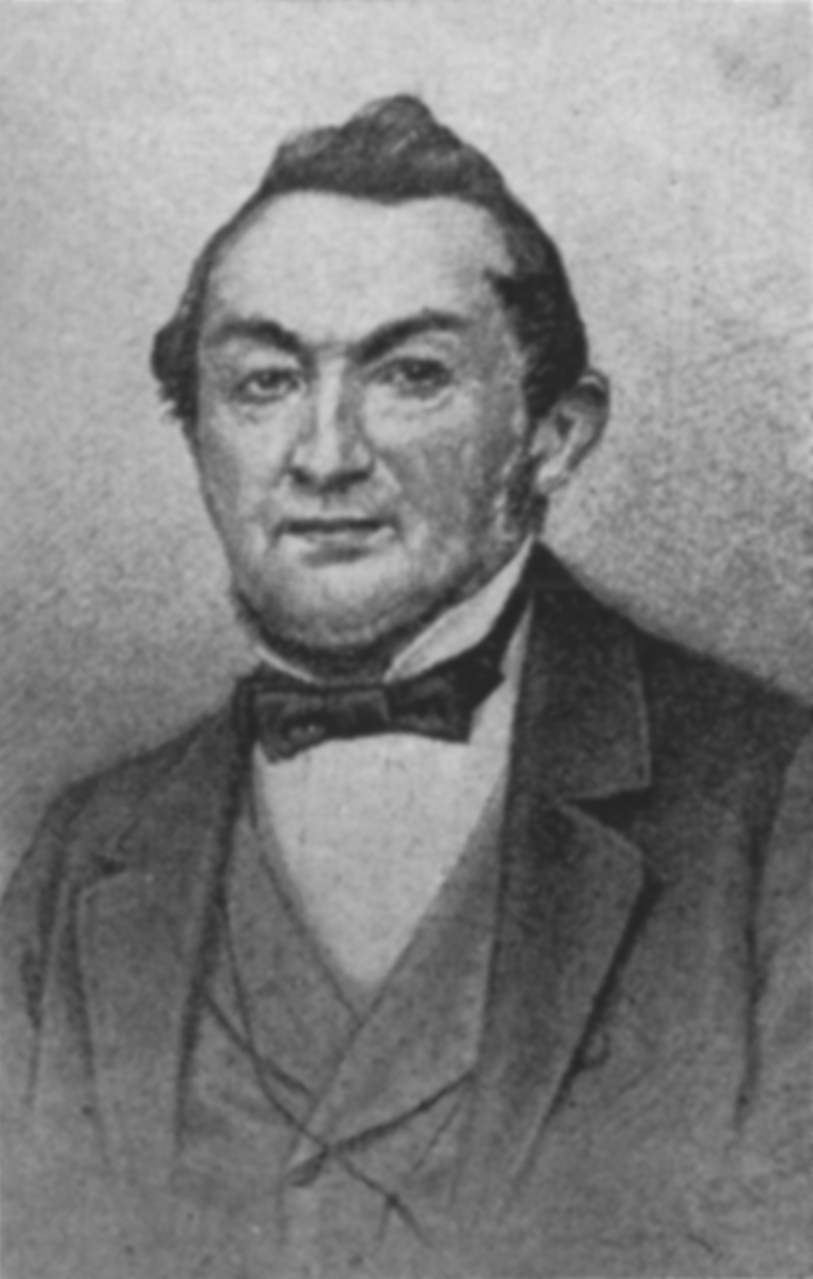
Franz Xaver Fieber

Franz Xaver Fieber (German pronunciation: [fʁants ˈksaːvɐ ˈfiːbɐ]; 1 March 1807 – 22 February 1872) was a German Bohemian botanist and entomologist.

== Biography ==
Fieber was born on 1 March 1807 in Prague. He was the son of Franz Anton Fieber and Maria Anna née Hantsehl. He studied economics, management science and modern languages at the Czech Technical University in Prague from 1824 to 1828. He began work in finance (civil service) before becoming a magistrate in Chrudim in Bohemia.

Fieber was a Member of the Deutsche Akademie der Naturforscher Leopoldina. He was the author of "Synopsis der europäischen Orthopteren" (1854), Die europäischen Hemiptera (1860), and numerous other publications on insects. He worked notably on insect wings. As well as Hemiptera, he studied Orthoptera.

Fieber died on 22 February 1872 in Chrudim, at the age of 64.
