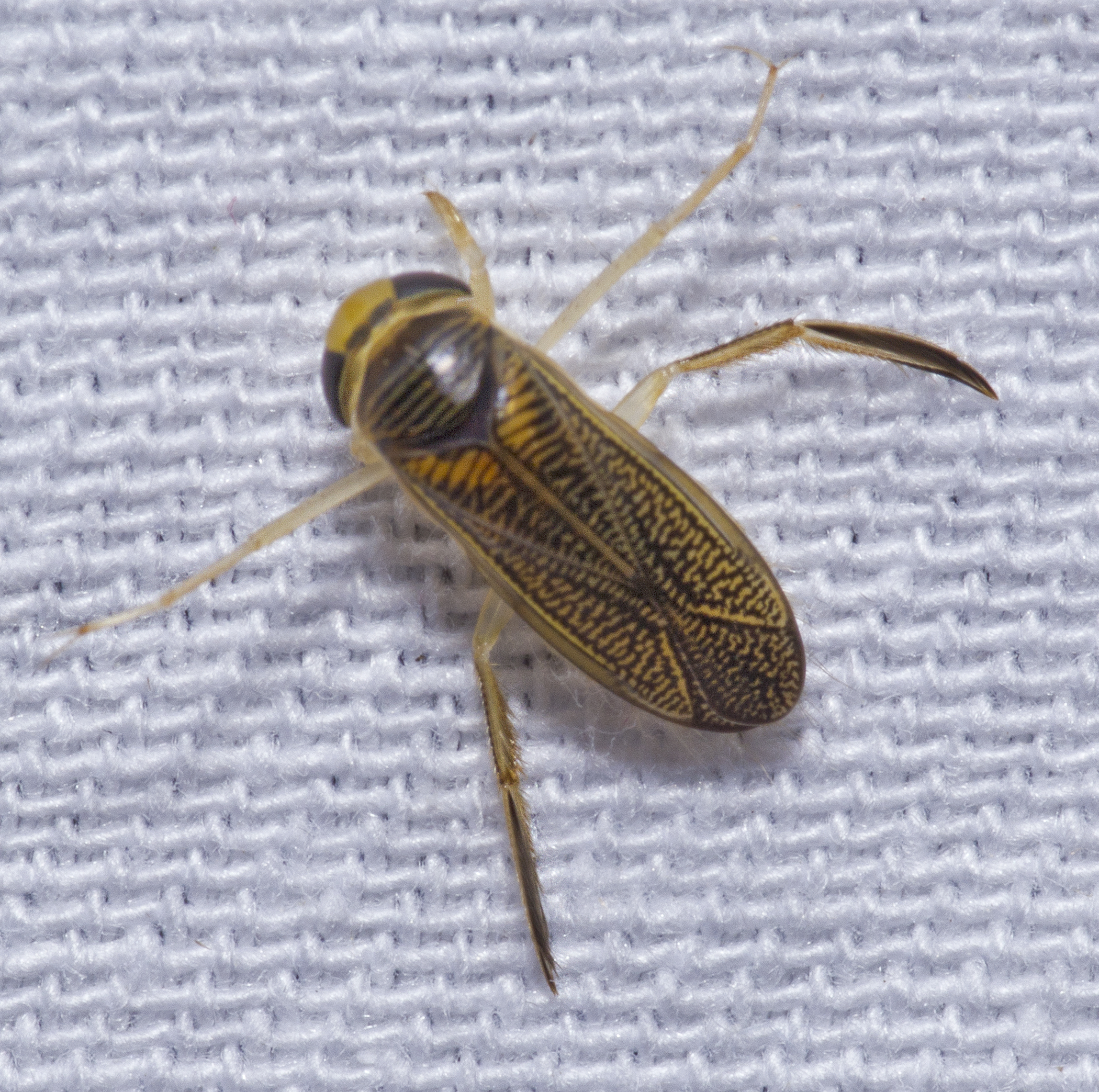
- Callicorixa praeusta

Scientific classification
- Kingdom: Animalia
- Phylum: Arthropoda
- Clade: Pancrustacea
- Class: Insecta
- Order: Hemiptera
- Suborder: Heteroptera
- Family: Corixidae
- Subfamily: Corixinae
- Tribe: Corixini

= Corixini =

Tribe of true bugs

Corixini is a tribe of water boatmen in the family Corixidae. There are about 9 genera and at least 30 described species in the genus Corixini.

== Genera ==
These nine genera belong to the tribe Corixini:

- Arctocorisa Wallengren, 1894^{i c g b}
- Callicorixa White, 1873^{i c g b}
- Cenocorixa Hungerford, 1948^{i c g b}
- Corisella Lundblad, 1928^{i c g b}
- Hesperocorixa Kirkaldy, 1908^{i c g b}
- Palmocorixa^{b}
- Ramphocorixa Abbott, 1912^{i c g b}
- Sigara Fabricius, 1775^{i c g b}
- Trichocorixa Kirkaldy, 1908^{i c g b}

Data sources: i = ITIS, c = Catalogue of Life, g = GBIF, b = Bugguide.net
