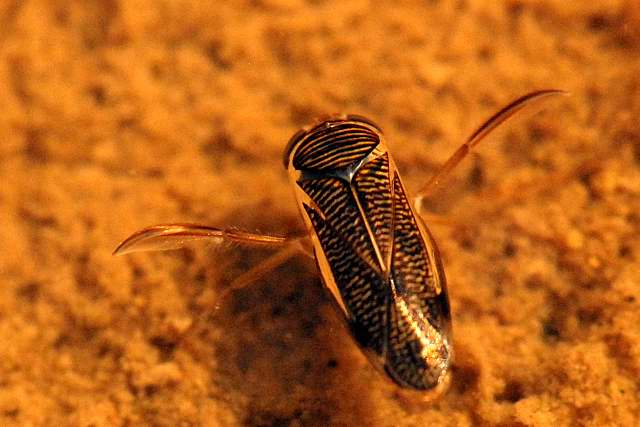
- Hesperocorixa castanea

Scientific classification
- Kingdom: Animalia
- Phylum: Arthropoda
- Clade: Pancrustacea
- Class: Insecta
- Order: Hemiptera
- Suborder: Heteroptera
- Infraorder: Nepomorpha
- Family: Corixidae; Leach, 1815

Subfamilies and genera
- 52 genera in 5 subfamilies

= Corixidae =

Corixidae Temporal range: Late Triassic–Present

Family of true bugs

Corixidae is a family of aquatic insects in the order Hemiptera. They are found worldwide in virtually any freshwater habitat and a few species live in saline water. There are about 500 known species worldwide, in 55 genera, including the genus Sigara.

Members of the Corixidae are commonly known as lesser water boatmen: the term used in the United Kingdom to distinguish species such as Corixa punctata from Notonecta glauca, or greater water-boatman, an insect of a different family, Notonectidae.

== Morphology and ecology ==
Corixidae generally have a long flattened body ranging from 2.5 to 15 mm (0.1–0.6 in) long. Many have extremely fine dark brown or black striations marking the wings. They tend to have four long rear legs and two short front ones. The forelegs are covered with hairs and shaped like oars, hence the name "water boatman". Their four hindmost legs have scoop- or oar-shaped tarsi to aid swimming. They also have a triangular head with short, triangular mouthparts. Corixidae dwell in slow rivers and ponds, as well as some household pools.

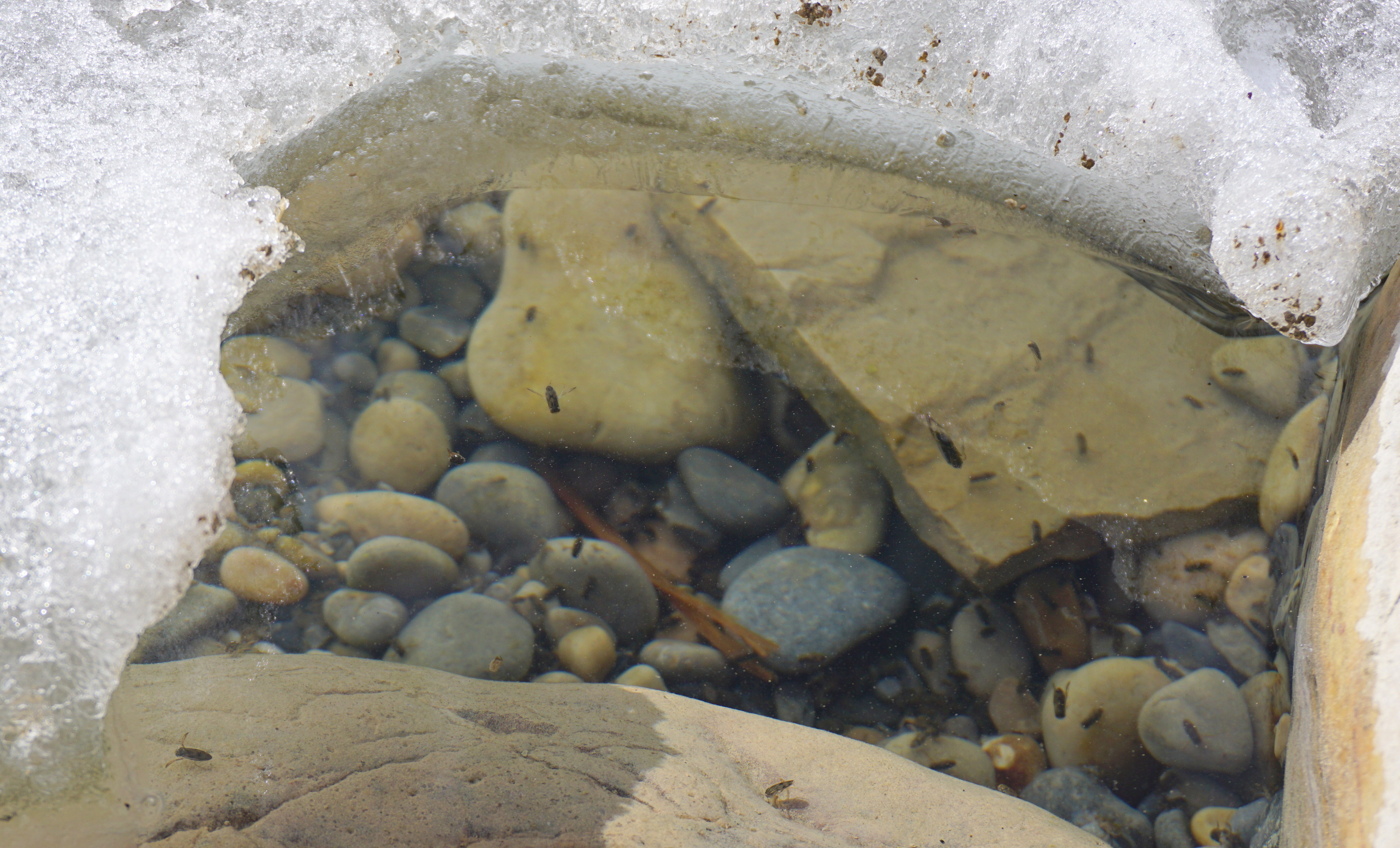
Water boatmen active under the ice in March at Glenmore Reservoir, Calgary, Alberta

Unlike their relatives the backswimmers (Notonectidae), who swim upside down, Corixidae swim right side up. It is easy to tell the two types of insects apart simply by looking at the swimming position.

Corixids mainly forage in the benthic zone, feeding on algae, protozoa, and other small aquatic organisms such as larvae and brine shrimp. They use their straw-like mouthparts to inject enzymes into their food. The enzymes digest the material, letting the insect suck the liquefied food back through its mouthparts and into its digestive tract. Different subgroups in the family display a variety of feeding styles, such as detritivorous, herbivorous, omnivorous, or completely carnivorous such as the subfamily Cymatiainae.

Some species within this family are preyed upon by a number of amphibians including the rough-skinned newt (Taricha granulosa).

The reproductive cycle of Corixidae is annual. Eggs are typically laid on a variety of underwater objects, such as submerged plants, sticks, rocks, or even crayfish. Eggs typically hatch within two weeks. In waters without many submerged oviposition sites, every bit of available substrate will be covered in eggs.

It is common for adults to overwinter but may be found swimming underneath the ice or trapped in air pockets within. Dispersal flights are common in many species and may be carried as high as 5,000 feet in the air. Many genera in Corixidae use stridulation to attract mates, and some songs are species- and sex-specific.

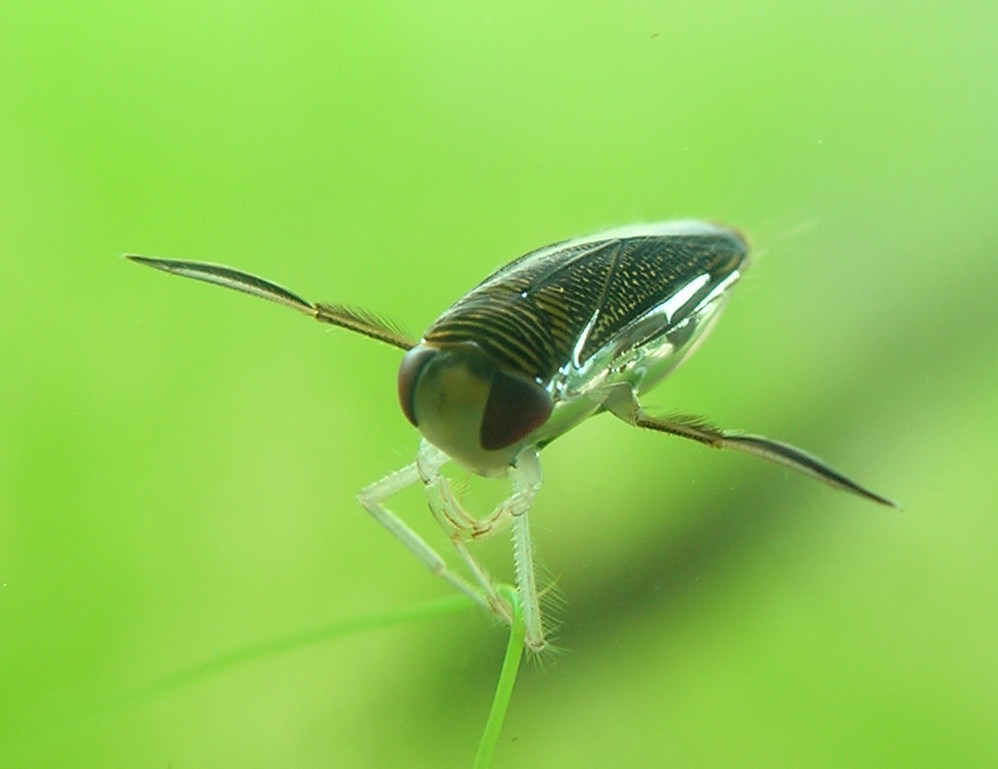
Corixa punctata

== Genera ==
These 52 genera belong to the family Corixidae:

- Acromocoris Bode, 1953^{g}
- Agraptocorixa Kirkaldy, 1898^{g}
- Archaecorixa Popov, 1968^{g}
- Arctocorisa Wallengren, 1894^{i c g b}
- Bakharia Popov, 1988^{g}
- Bumbacorixa Popov, 1986^{g}
- Callicorixa White, 1873^{i c g b}
- Cenocorixa Hungerford, 1948^{i c g b}
- Centrocorisa Lundblad, 1928^{i c g}
- Corisella Lundblad, 1928^{i c g b}
- Corixa Geoffroy, 1762^{i c g}
- Corixalia Popov, 1986^{g}
- Corixonecta Popov, 1986^{g}
- Corixopsis Hong & Wang, 1990^{g}
- Cristocorixa Popov, 1986^{g}
- Cymatia Flor, 1860^{i c g b}
- Dasycorixa Hungerford, 1948^{i c g b}
- Diacorixa Popov, 1971^{g}
- Diapherinus Popov, 1966^{g}
- Diaprepocoris^{c g}
- Ectemnostegella Lundblad, 1928^{g}
- Gazimuria Popov, 1971^{g}
- Glaenocorisa Thomson, 1869^{i c g b}
- Graptocorixa Hungerford, 1930^{i c g b}
- Haenbea Popov, 1988^{g}
- Heliocorisa Lundblad, 1928^{g}
- Hesperocorixa Kirkaldy, 1908^{i c g b}
- Liassocorixa Popov, Dolling & Whalley, 1994^{g}
- Linicorixa Lin, 1980^{g}
- Lufengnacta Lin, 1977^{g}
- Mesocorixa Hong & Wang, 1990^{g}
- Mesosigara Popov, 1971^{g}
- Morphocorixa Jaczewski, 1931^{i c g}
- Neocorixa Hungerford, 1925^{i c g}
- Neosigara Lundblad, 1928^{g}
- Palmacorixa Abbott, 1912^{i c g}
- Palmocorixa^{b}
- Paracorixa Stichel, 1955^{g}
- Parasigara Poisson, 1957^{g}
- Pseudocorixa Jaczewski, 1931^{i c g}
- Ramphocorixa Abbott, 1912^{i c g b}
- Ratiticorixa Lin, 1980^{g}
- Shelopuga Popov, 1988^{g}
- Siculicorixa Lin, 1980^{g}
- Sigara Fabricius, 1775^{i c g b}
- Sigaretta Popov, 1971^{g}
- Trichocorixa Kirkaldy, 1908^{i c g b}
- Velocorixa Popov, 1986^{g}
- Venacorixa Lin Qibin, 1986^{g}
- Vulcanicorixa Lin, 1980^{g}
- Xenocorixa Hungerford, 1947^{g}
- Yanliaocorixa Hong, 1983^{g}

Data sources: i = ITIS, c = Catalogue of Life, g = GBIF, b = Bugguide.net
