= List of Hemiptera of Ireland =

This is a list of the Hemiptera (true bugs) recorded on the island of Ireland.

== Infraorder Dipsocoromorpha ==
=== Family Ceratocombidae ===
  - Ceratocombus coleoptratus (Zetterstedt, 1819)

=== Family Dipsocoridae ===
  - Cryptostemma alienum Herrich-Schäffer 1835
  - Pachycoleus waltli Fieber 1860

== Infraorder Gerromorpha (semiaquatic bugs) ==
=== Superfamily Gerroidea ===
==== Family Gerridae (water striders) ====
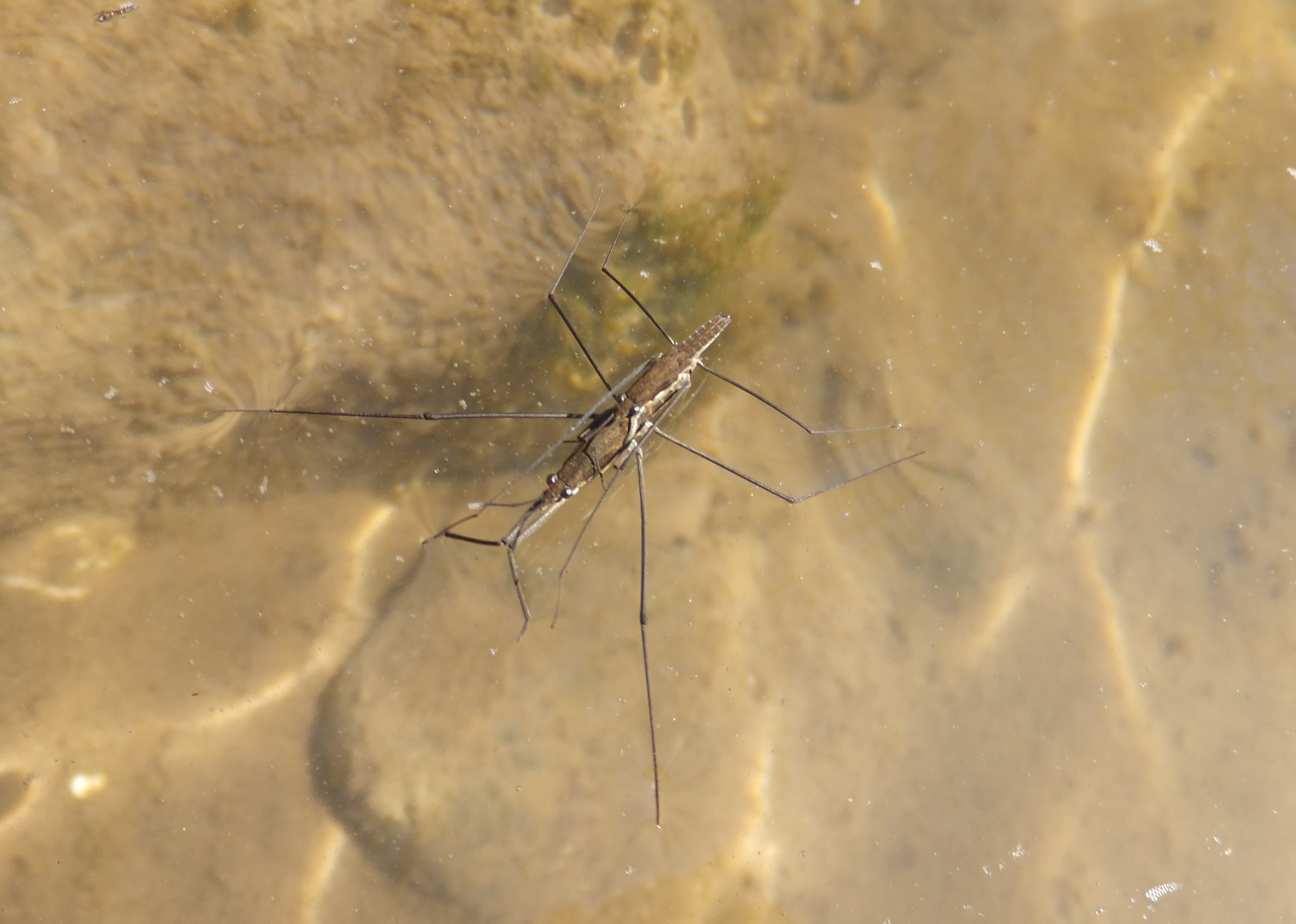
Two water skaters (Aquarius najas) mating.

  - Aquarius najas (De Geer 1773)
  - Gerris argentatus Schummel 1832
  - Gerris costae (Herrich-Schäffer 1850)
  - Gerris lacustris (Linnaeus 1758)
  - Gerris odontogaster (Zetterstedt 1828)
  - Gerris thoracicus Schummel 1832
  - Gerris lateralis Schummel 1832
  - Limnoporus rufoscutellatus (Latreille 1807)

==== Family Veliidae (riffle bugs) ====
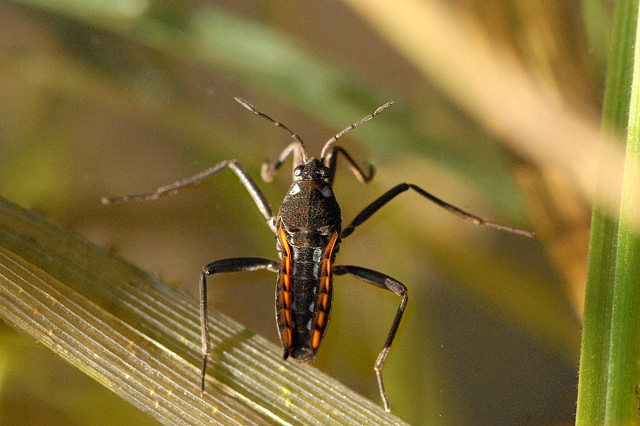
Water cricket (Velia caprai)

  - Microvelia reticulata (Burmeister 1835)
  - Microvelia pygmaea (Dufour 1833)
  - Velia caprai Tamanini 1947
  - Velia saulii Tamanini 1947

=== Superfamily Hebroidea ===
==== Family Hebridae (velvet water bugs) ====
  - Hebrus pusillus (Fallen 1807)
  - Hebrus ruficeps Thomson, 1871

=== Superfamily Hydrometroidea ===
==== Family Hydrometridae (marsh treaders, water measurers) ====
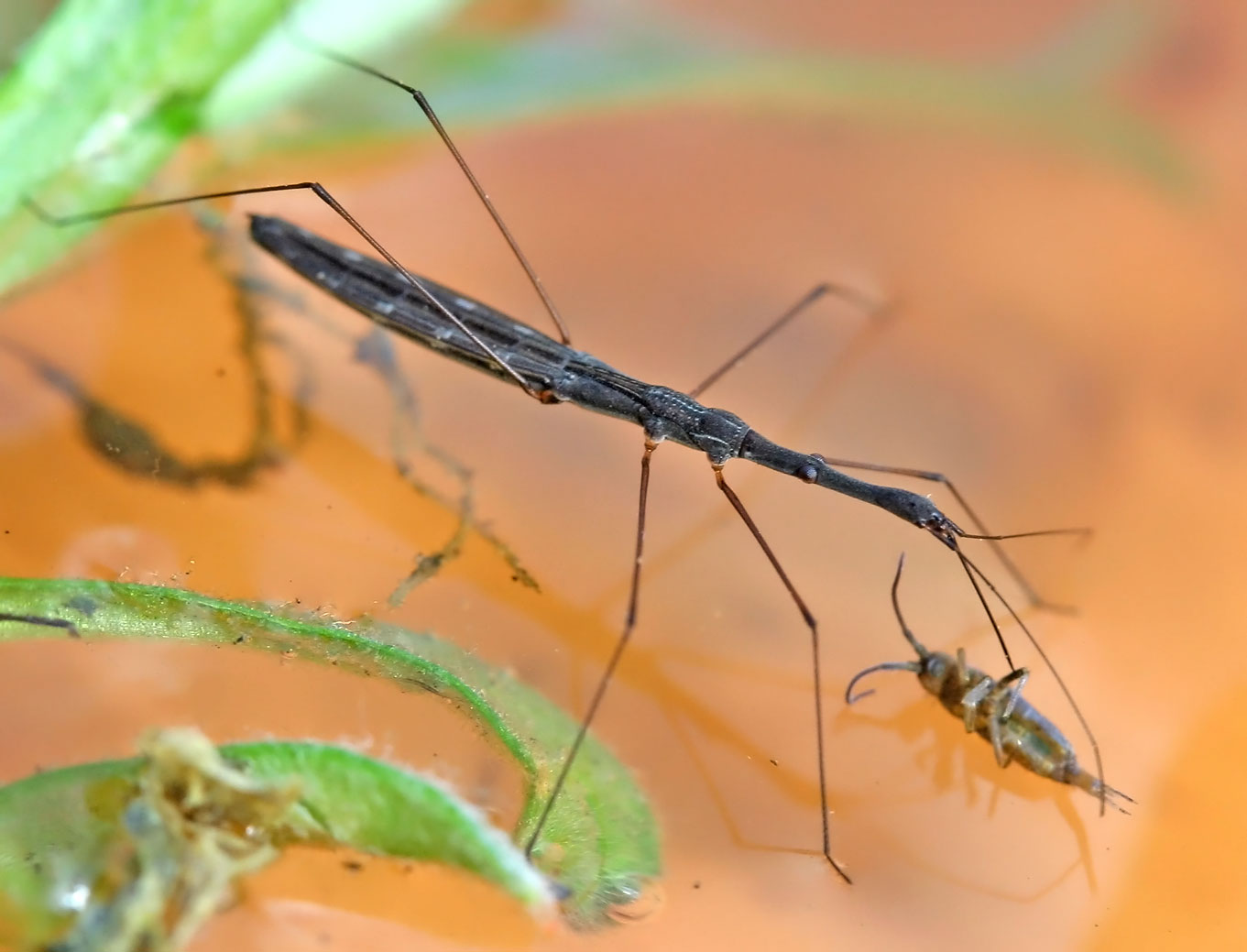
Hydrometra stagnorum, a water measurer especially common in Ulster and coastal areas.

  - Hydrometra stagnorum (Linnaeus 1758)
  - Hydrometra gracilenta Horváth, 1899

== Infraorder Leptopodomorpha ==
=== Family Saldidae (shore bugs) ===
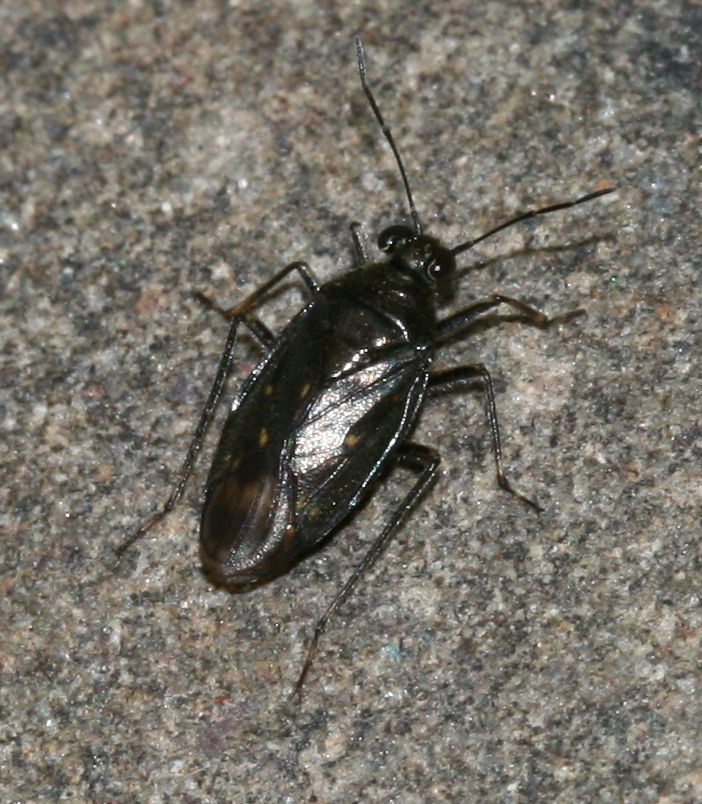
Macrosaldula scotica, a species of shore bug.

- Chartoscirta cincta (Herrich-Schäffer 1841)
- Chartoscirta elegantula (Fallen 1807)
- Chiloxanthus pilosus (Fallen 1807)
- Halosalda lateralis (Fallen 1807)
- Macrosaldula scotica (Curtis 1835)
- Saldula connemarae Walton 1986
- Saldula opacula (Zetterstedt 1838)
- Saldula orthochila (Fieber 1859)
- Saldula pallipes (Fabricius 1794)
- Saldula palustris (Douglas 1874)
- Saldula pilosella (Thomson 1871)
- Saldula saltatoria (Linnaeus 1758)

=== Family Aepophilidae ===
  - Aepophilus bonnairei Signoret 1879

== Infraorder Nepomorpha (true water bugs) ==
=== Superfamily Corixoidea ===
==== Family Corixidae (water boatmen) ====
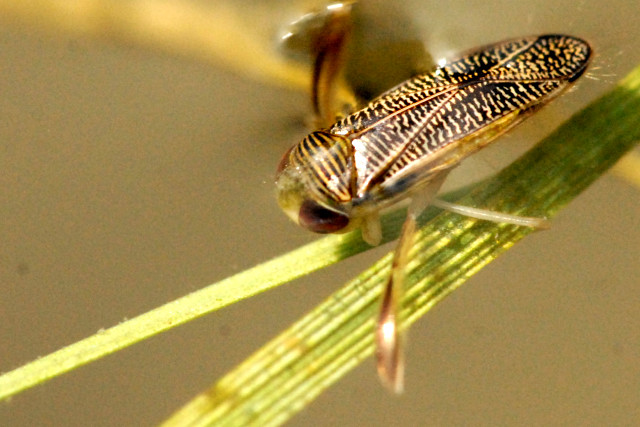
Sigara scotti, a species of water boatman found mostly in the west of Ireland.

- Arctocorisa carinata (C.R. Sahlberg 1819)
- Arctocorisa germari (Fieber 1848)
- Callicorixa praeusta (Fieber 1848)
- Callicorixa wollastoni (Douglas & Scott, 1865)
- Corixa affinis Leach 1817
- Corixa dentipes Thomson 1869
- Corixa iberica Jansson 1981
- Corixa panzeri Fieber 1848
- Corixa punctata (Illiger 1807)
- Cymatia bonsdorffii (C.R. Sahlberg 1819)
- Glaenocorisa cavifrons (Thomson 1869)
- Hesperocorixa castanea (Thomson 1869)
- Hesperocorixa linnaei (Fieber 1848)
- Hesperocorixa moesta (Fieber 1848)
- Hesperocorixa sahlbergi (Fieber 1848)
- Micronecta griseola Horvath 1899
- Micronecta poweri (Douglas & Scott 1869)
- Paracorixa concinna (Fieber 1848)
- Sigara selecta (Fieber 1848)
- Sigara stagnalis (Leach 1817)
- Sigara nigrolineata (Fieber 1848)
- Sigara limitata (Fieber 1848)
- Sigara semistriata (Fieber 1848)
- Sigara venusta (Douglas & Scott 1869)
- Sigara dorsalis (Leach 1817)
- Sigara distincta (Fieber 1848)
- Sigara falleni (Fieber 1848)
- Sigara fallenoidea (Hungerford 1926)
- Sigara fossarum (Leach 1817)
- Sigara scotti (Douglas & Scott 1868)
- Sigara lateralis (Leach 1817)

=== Superfamily Nepoidea ===
==== Family Nepidae (water scorpions, needle bugs) ====
  - Nepa cinerea Linnaeus 1758

=== Superfamily Aphelocheiroidea ===
==== Family Aphelocheiridae ====
  - Aphelocheirus aestivalis (Fabricius 1794)

=== Superfamily Notonectoidea ===
==== Family Notonectidae (backswimmers) ====
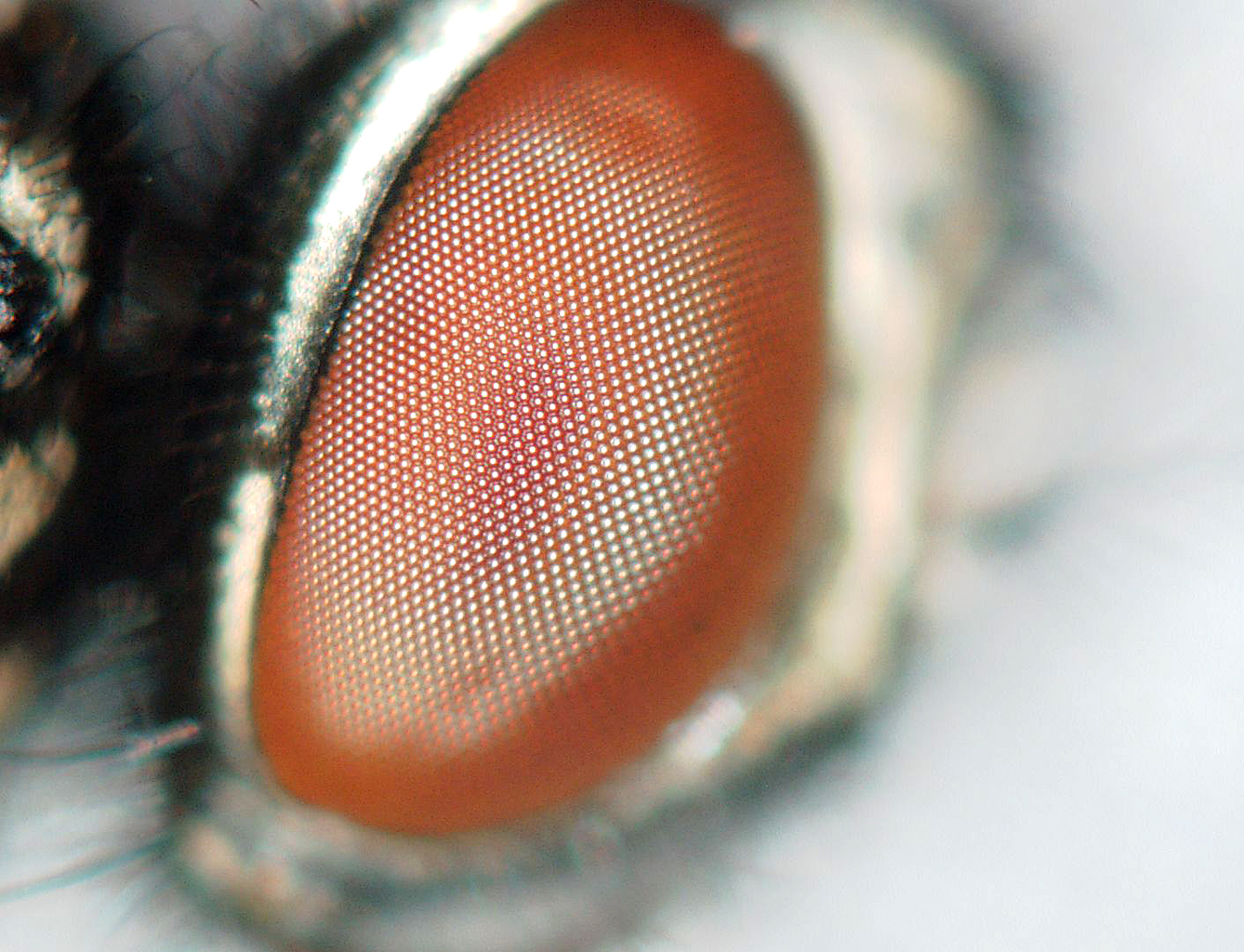
Compound eye of Notonecta glauca, the object of much study.

  - Notonecta glauca Linnaeus, 1758
  - Notonecta obliqua Thunberg, 1787
  - Notonecta viridis Delcourt, 1909
  - Notonecta maculata Fabricius, 1794

=== Superfamily Pleoidea ===
==== Family Pleidae ====
- Plea minutissima Leach 1817

== Infraorder Cimicomorpha (Assassin bugs, bed bugs, etc.) ==
=== Superfamily Cimicoidea ===
==== Family Anthocoridae (minute pirate bugs or flower bugs) ====
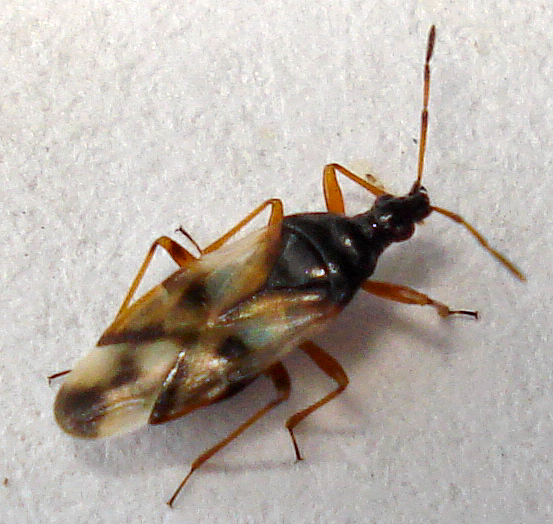
Anthocoris nemorum

- Acompocoris alpinus Reuter, 1875
- Acompocoris pygmaeus (Fallen 1807)
- Anthocoris butleri Le Quesne, 1954
- Anthocoris confusus Reuter 1884
- Anthocoris gallarumulmi (De Geer 1773)
- Anthocoris limbatus Fieber 1836
- Anthocoris nemoralis (Fabricius 1794)
- Anthocoris nemorum (Linnaeus 1761)
- Anthocoris sarothamni Douglas & Scott 1865
- Dufouriellus ater (Dufour 1833)
- Lyctocoris campestris (Fabricius 1794)
- Orius laticollis (Reuter 1884)
- Orius majusculus (Reuter 1879)
- Orius laevigatus (Fieber 1860)
- Orius niger (Wolff 1811)
- Temnostethus gracilis Horvath 1907
- Temnostethus pusillus (Herrich-Schäffer 1835)
- Temnostethus tibialis Reuter 1888
- Tetraphleps bicuspis (Herrich-Schäffer 1835)

==== Family Microphysidae ====
  - Loricula elegantula (Baerensprung 1858)
  - Loricula exilis (Fallen 1807)
  - Loricula inconspicua (Douglas & Scott 1871)

==== Family Cimicidae (bed bugs, bat bugs) ====
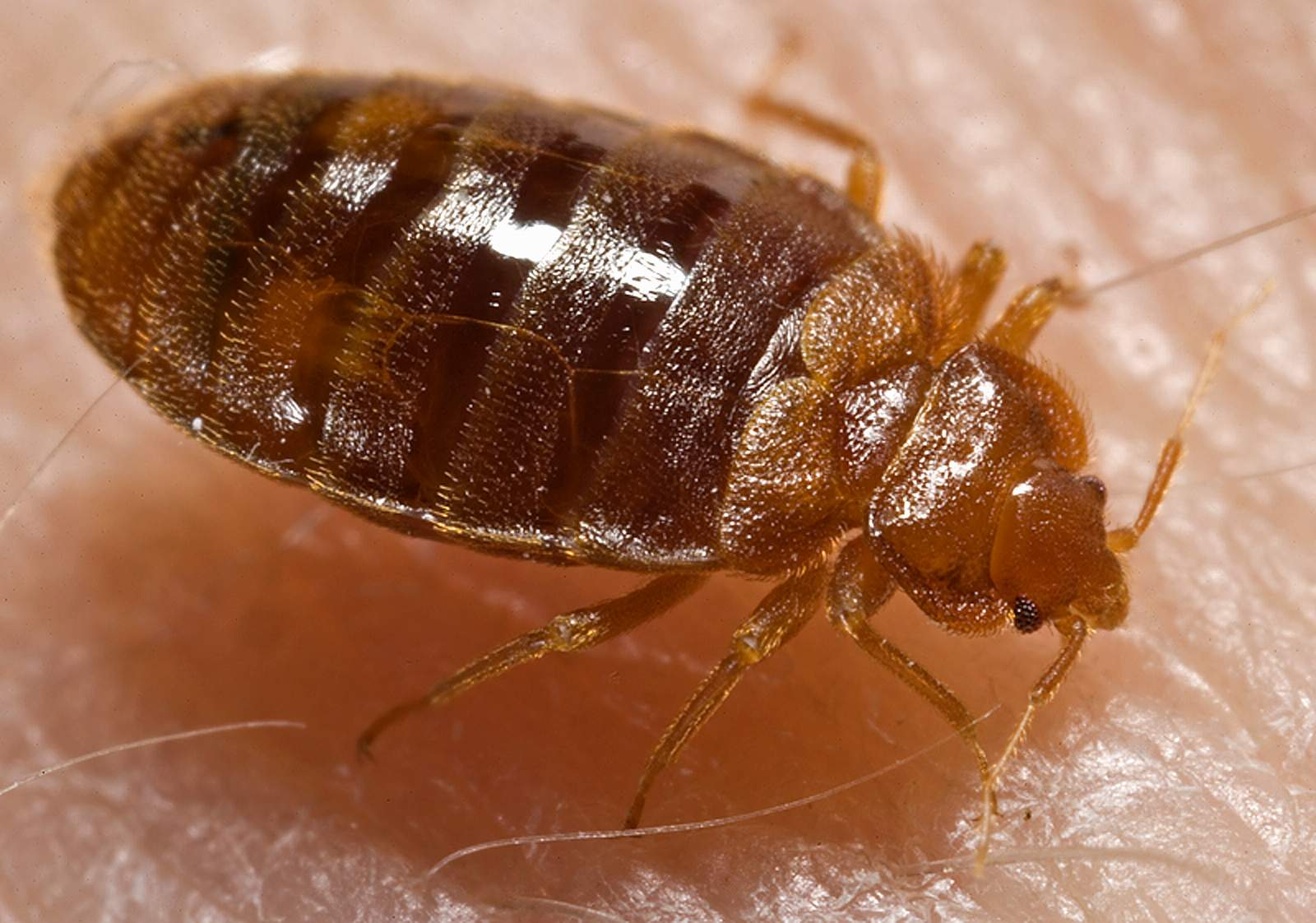
Common bed bug (Cimex lectularius), which causes skin rashes, psychological effects, and allergic symptoms in the humans it bites.

  - Cimex lectularius Linnaeus 1758
  - Cimex pipistrelli Jenyns 1839
  - Oeciacus hirundinis (Lamarck 1816)

==== Family Miridae (plant bugs, leaf bugs, grass bugs) ====
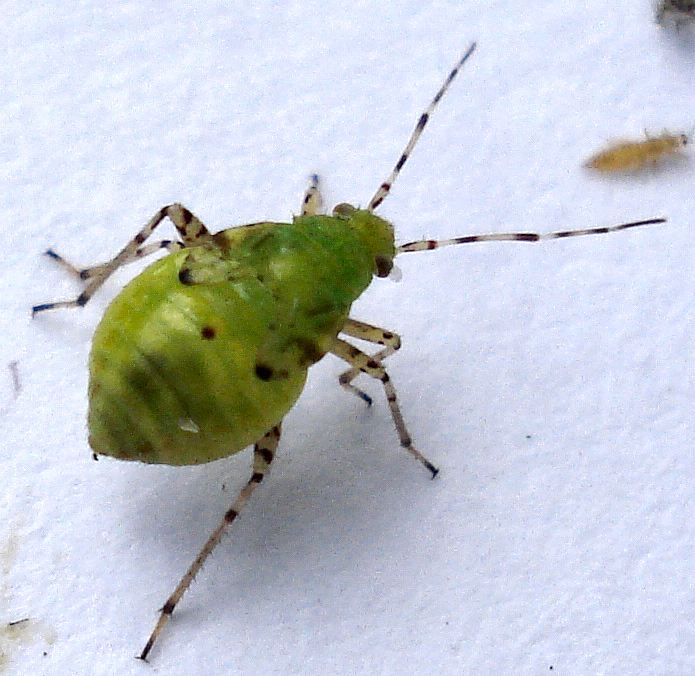
Nymph (immature form) of the common nettle bug (Liocoris tripustulatus).

- Adelphocoris lineolatus (Goeze 1778)
- Adelphocoris seticornis (Fabricius 1775)
- Apolygus lucorum (Meyer-Dür 1843)
- Apolygus spinolae (Meyer-Dür 1841)
- Asciodema obsoleta (Fieber 1864)
- Atractotomus magnicornis (Fallen 1807)
- Blepharidopterus angulatus (Fallen 1807)
- Bothynotus pilosus (Boheman 1852)
- Bryocoris pteridis (Fallen 1807)
- Calocoris roseomaculatus (De Geer 1773)
- Camptozygum aequale (Villers 1789)
- Campyloneura virgula (Herrich-Schäffer 1835)
- Capsodes flavomarginatus (Donovan 1798)
- Capsus ater (Linnaeus 1758)
- Charagochilus gyllenhalii (Fallen 1807)
- Chlamydatus pullus (Reuter 1870)
- Closterotomus norwegicus (Gmelin 1790)
- Compsidolon salicellum (Herrich-Schäffer 1841)
- Conostethus brevis Reuter 1877
- Conostethus griseus Douglas & Scott 1870
- Cyllecoris histrionius (Linnaeus 1767)
- Cyrtorhinus caricis (Fallen 1807)
- Deraeocoris ruber (Linnaeus 1758)
- Deraeocoris scutellaris (Fabricius 1794)
- Dichrooscytus rufipennis (Fallen 1807)
- Dicyphus constrictus (Boheman 1852)
- Dicyphus epilobii Reuter 1883
- Dicyphus errans (Wolff 1804)
- Dicyphus stachydis J. Sahlberg 1878
- Dicyphus pallicornis (Fieber 1861)
- Dryophilocoris flavoquadrimaculatus (De Geer 1773)
- Fieberocapsus flaveolus (Reuter 1870)
- Globiceps flavomaculatus (Fabricius 1794)
- Globiceps fulvicollis Jakovlev 1877
- Grypocoris stysi (Wagner 1968)
- Hallodapus rufescens (Burmeister 1835)
- Harpocera thoracica (Fallen 1807)
- Heterocordylus tibialis (Hahn 1833)
- Heterotoma planicornis (Pallas 1772)
- Leptopterna dolabrata (Linnaeus 1758)
- Leptopterna ferrugata (Fallen 1807)
- Liocoris tripustulatus (Fabricius 1781)
- Lygocoris pabulinus (Linnaeus 1761)
- Lygocoris rugicollis (Fallen 1807)
- Lygus maritimus Wagner 1949
- Lygus rugulipennis Poppius 1911
- Lygus wagneri Remane 1955
- Macrolophus pygmaeus (Rambur 1839)
- Macrotylus paykullii (Fallen 1807)
- Malacocoris chlorizans (Panzer 1794)
- Mecomma dispar (Boheman 1852)
- Mecomma ambulans (Fallen 1807)
- Megalocoleus molliculus (Fallen 1807)
- Miris striatus (Linnaeus 1758)
- Monalocoris filicis (Linnaeus 1758)
- Neolygus contaminatus (Fallen 1807)
- Neolygus viridis (Fallen 1807)
- Notostira erratica (Linnaeus 1758)
- Orthocephalus coriaceus (Fabricius 1777)
- Orthocephalus saltator (Hahn 1835)
- Orthonotus rufifrons (Fallen 1807)
- Orthops basalis (A. Costa 1853)
- Orthops campestris (Linnaeus 1758)
- Orthops kalmii (Linnaeus 1758)
- Orthotylus ericetorum (Fallen 1807)
- Orthotylus flavosparsus (C.R. Sahlberg 1841)
- Orthotylus flavinervis (Kirschbaum 1856)
- Orthotylus marginalis Reuter 1883
- Orthotylus nassatus (Fabricius 1787)
- Orthotylus ochrotrichus Fieber 1864
- Orthotylus prasinus (Fallen 1826)
- Orthotylus tenellus (Fallen 1807)
- Orthotylus viridinervis (Kirschbaum 1856)
- Orthotylus adenocarpi (Perris 1857)
- Orthotylus concolor (Kirschbaum 1856)
- Orthotylus virescens (Douglas & Scott 1865)
- Orthotylus bilineatus (Fallen 1807)
- Pachytomella parallela (Meyer-Dür 1843)
- Pantilius tunicatus (Fabricius 1781)
- Phylus coryli (Linnaeus 1758)
- Phylus melanocephalus (Linnaeus 1767)
- Phytocoris ulmi (Linnaeus 1758)
- Phytocoris varipes Boheman 1852
- Phytocoris dimidiatus Kirschbaum 1856
- Phytocoris longipennis Flor 1861
- Phytocoris populi (Linnaeus 1758)
- Phytocoris reuteri Saunders 1876
- Phytocoris tiliae (Fabricius 1777)
- Pinalitus atomarius (Meyer-Dür 1843)
- Pinalitus cervinus (Herrich-Schäffer 1841)
- Pinalitus rubricatus (Fallen 1807)
- Pithanus maerkelii (Herrich-Schäffer 1838)
- Plagiognathus arbustorum (Fabricius 1794)
- Plagiognathus chrysanthemi (Wolff 1804)
- Platycranus bicolor Douglas & Scott 1868
- Plesiodema pinetella (Zetterstedt 1828)
- Polymerus palustris (Reuter 1907)
- Polymerus nigrita (Fallen 1807)
- Psallodema fieberi (Fieber 1864)
- Psallus betuleti (Fallen 1826)
- Psallus perrisi (Mulsant & Rey 1852)
- Psallus variabilis (Fallen 1807)
- Psallus wagneri Ossiannilsson 1953
- Psallus ambiguus (Fallen 1807)
- Psallus quercus (Kirschbaum 1856)
- Psallus confusus Rieger 1981
- Psallus falleni Reuter 1883
- Psallus flavellus Stichel 1933
- Psallus haematodes (Gmelin 1790)
- Psallus lepidus Fieber 1858
- Psallus mollis (Mulsant & Rey 1852)
- Psallus salicis (Kirschbaum 1856)
- Psallus varians (Herrich-Schäffer 1841)
- Rhabdomiris striatellus (Fabricius 1794)
- Stenodema calcarata (Fallen 1807)
- Stenodema holsata (Fabricius 1787)
- Stenodema laevigatum (Linnaeus 1758)
- Stenotus binotatus (Fabricius 1794)
- Teratocoris saundersi Douglas & Scott 1869
- Teratocoris viridis Douglas & Scott 1867
- Trigonotylus ruficornis (Geoffroy 1785)
- Tytthus pubescens (Knight 1931)
- Tytthus pygmaeus (Zetterstedt 1838)

==== Family Nabidae (damsel bugs) ====
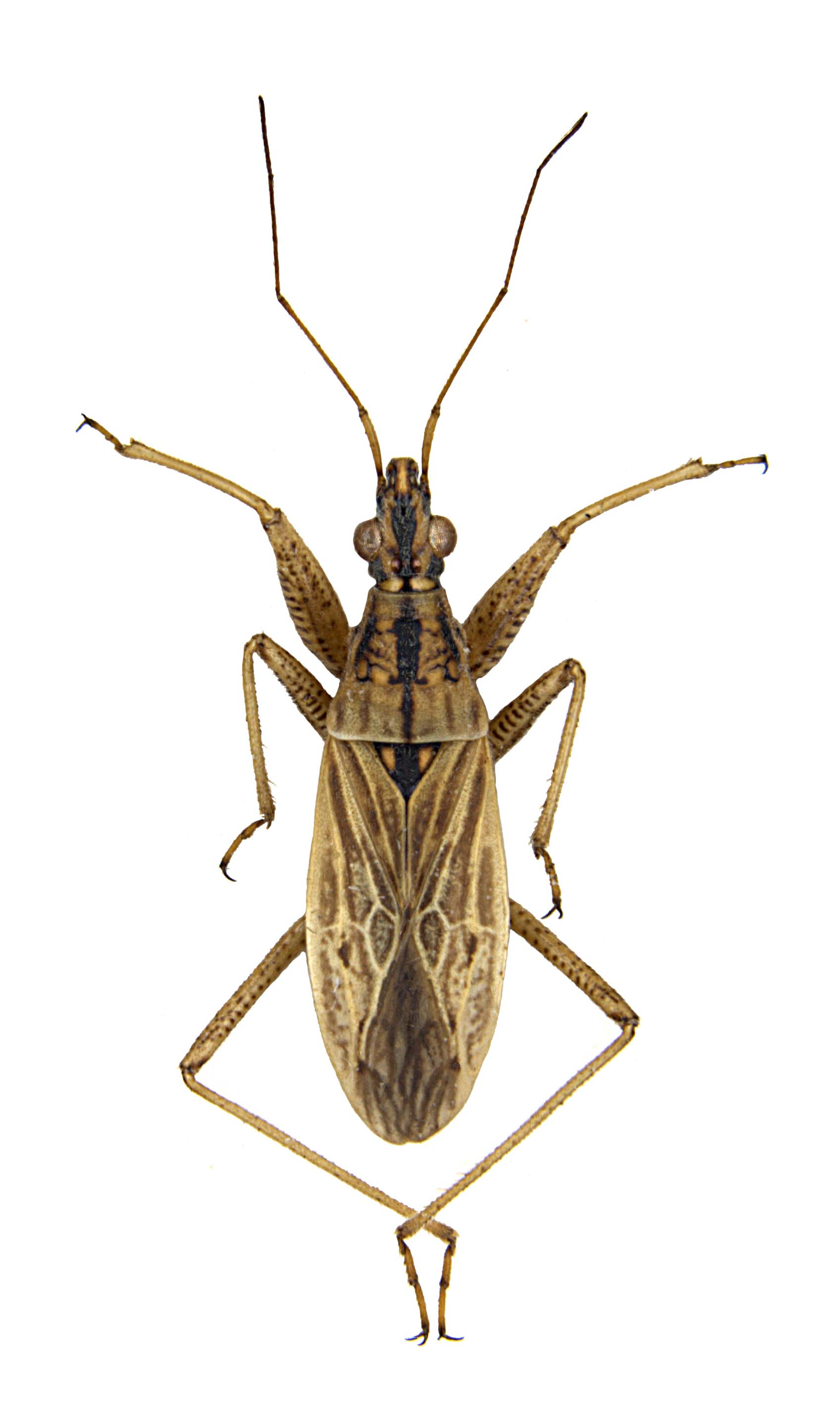
Nabis rugosus, a predatory damsel bug.

  - Himacerus major (A. Costa 1842)
  - Himacerus mirmicoides (O. Costa 1834)
  - Himacerus boops (Schiødte 1870)
  - Nabis limbatus Dahlbom 1851
  - Nabis lineatus Dahlbom 1851
  - Nabis flavomarginatus Scholtz 1847
  - Nabis ericetorum Scholtz 1847
  - Nabis ferus (Linnaeus 1758)
  - Nabis rugosus (Linnaeus 1758)

==== Family Reduviidae (assassin bugs) ====
  - Empicoris culiciformis (De Geer 1773)
  - Empicoris vagabundus (Linnaeus 1758)

==== Family Tingidae (lace bugs) ====
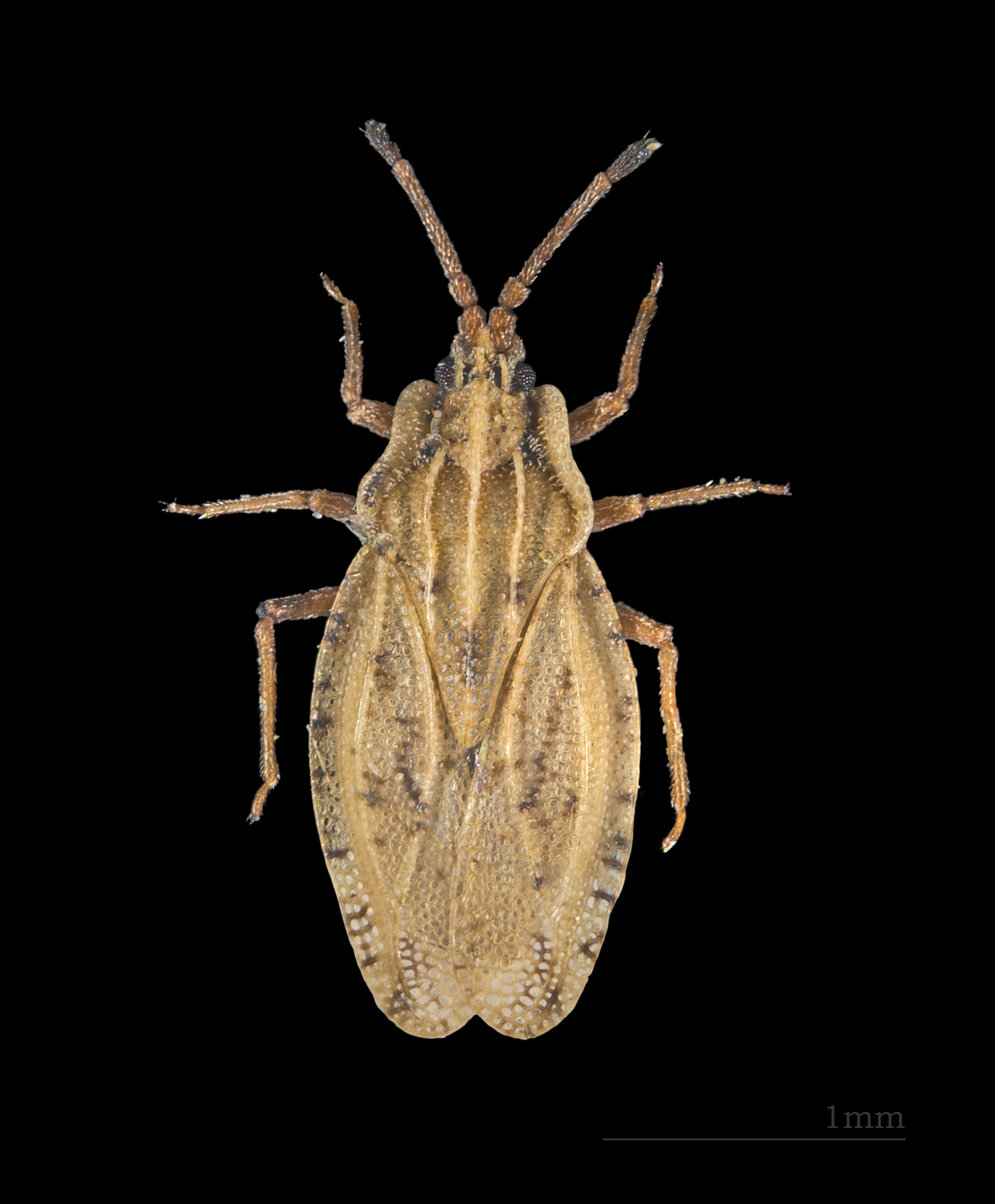
Tingis cardui, lace bug found in coastal parts of Ireland.

  - Acalypta brunnea (Germar 1837)
  - Acalypta carinata (Panzer 1806)
  - Acalypta parvula (Fallen 1807)
  - Derephysia foliacea (Fallen 1807)
  - Dictyla convergens (Herrich-Schäffer 1835)
  - Kalama tricornis (Schrank 1801)
  - Tingis cardui (Linnaeus 1758)

== Infraorder Pentatomomorpha ==
=== Superfamily Aradoidea ===
==== Family Aradidae (flat bugs) ====
  - Aradus depressus (Fabricius 1794)

=== Superfamily Pentatomoidea (shield bugs and relatives) ===
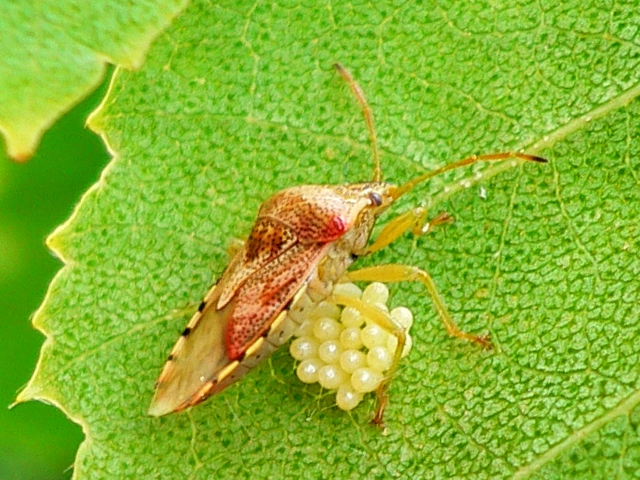
Parent bug (Elasmucha grisea) with eggs.

==== Family Acanthosomatidae (shield bugs) ====
  - Acanthosoma haemorrhoidale (Linnaeus 1758)
  - Elasmostethus interstinctus (Linnaeus 1758)
  - Elasmucha grisea (Linnaeus 1758)
  - Cyphostethus tristriatus (Fabricius, 1787)

==== Family Cydnidae (burrowing shield bugs) ====
  - Sehirus luctuosus Mulsant & Rey 1866
  - Thyreocoris scarabaeoides (Linnaeus 1758)

==== Family Scutelleridae (jewel bugs or metallic shield bugs) ====
  - Eurygaster maura (Linnaeus 1758)
  - Eurygaster testudinaria (Geoffroy 1785)

==== Family Pentatomidae (stink bugs) ====
  - Dolycoris baccarum (Linnaeus 1758)
  - Palomena prasina (Linnaeus 1761)
  - Pentatoma rufipes(Linnaeus, 1758)
  - Picromerus bidens (Linnaeus 1758)
  - Piezodorus lituratus (Fabricius 1794)
  - Rhacognathus punctatus (Linnaeus 1758)
  - Troilus luridus (Fabricius 1775)
  - Zicrona caerulea (Linnaeus 1758)

=== Superfamily Coreoidea ===
==== Family Alydidae (broad-headed bugs) ====
  - Alydus calcaratus (Linnaeus, 1758)

==== Family Coreidae (leaf-footed bugs) ====
  - Coreus marginatus (Linnaeus 1758)

==== Family Rhopalidae (scentless plant bugs) ====
  - Corizus hyoscyami (Linnaeus 1758)
  - Liorhyssus hyalinus (Fabricius 1794)

==== Family Stenocephalidae ====
- Dicranocephalus agilis (Scopoli 1763)

=== Superfamily Lygaeoidea ===
==== Family Berytidae (stilt bugs) ====
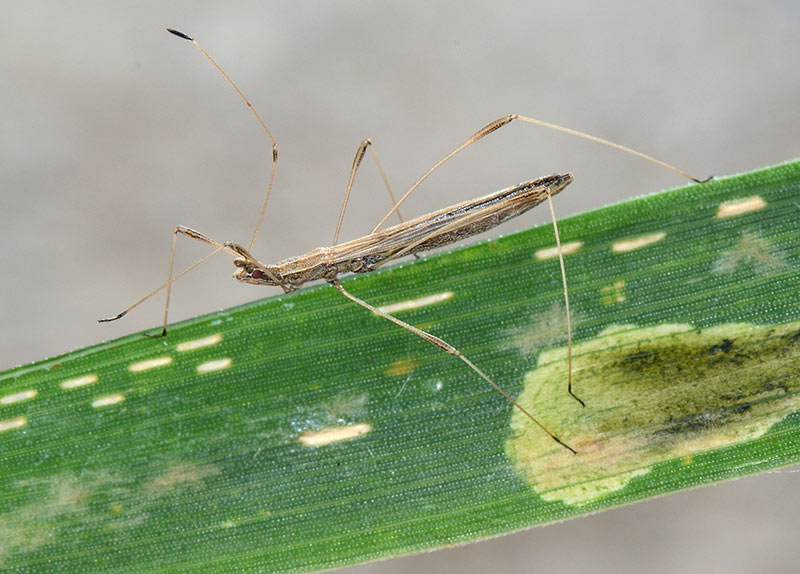
Neides tipularius, a stilt bug.

  - Berytinus minor (Herrich-Schäffer 1835)
  - Berytinus montivagus (Meyer-Dür 1841)
  - Berytinus signoreti (Fieber 1859)
  - Gampsocoris punctipes (Germar 1822)
  - Metatropis rufescens (Herrich-Schäffer 1835)
  - Neides tipularius (Linnaeus 1758)

==== Family Lygaeidae (milkweed bugs, true seed bugs) ====
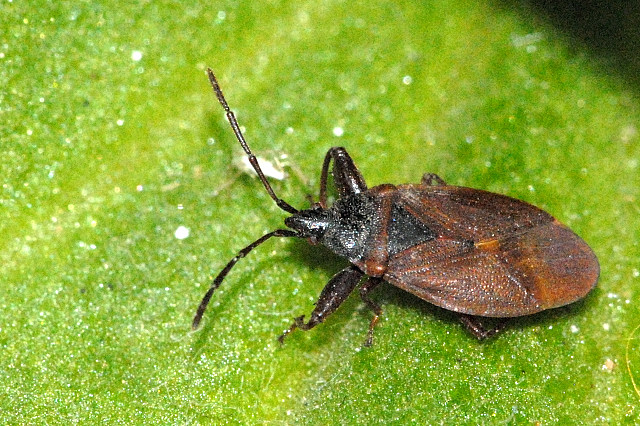
Pinecone bug (Gastrodes grossipes)

- Acompus rufipes (Wolff 1804)
- Chilacis typhae (Perris 1857)
- Cymus claviculus (Fallen 1807)
- Cymus glandicolor Hahn 1832
- Drymus pilicornis (Mulsant & Rey 1852)
- Drymus brunneus (R.F. Sahlberg 1848)
- Drymus ryeii Douglas & Scott 1865
- Drymus sylvaticus (Fabricius 1775)
- Gastrodes grossipes (De Geer 1773)
- Heterogaster urticae (Fabricius 1775)
- Ischnocoris angustulus (Boheman 1852)
- Ischnodemus sabuleti (Fallen 1826)
- Kleidocerys resedae (Panzer 1797)
- Lamproplax picea (Flor 1860)
- Lasiosomus enervis (Herrich-Schäffer 1835)
- Macrodema microptera (Curtis 1836)
- Megalonotus chiragra (Fabricius 1794)
- Megalonotus dilatatus (Herrich-Schäffer 1840)
- Nysius thymi (Wolff 1804)
- Pachybrachius fracticollis (Schilling 1829)
- Peritrechus geniculatus (Hahn 1832)
- Peritrechus lundii (Gmelin 1790)
- Plinthisus brevipennis (Latreille 1807)
- Scolopostethus affinis (Schilling 1829)
- Scolopostethus decoratus (Hahn 1833)
- Scolopostethus grandis Horvath 1880
- Scolopostethus puberulus Horvath 1887
- Scolopostethus thomsoni Reuter 1875
- Stygnocoris fuligineus (Geoffroy 1785)
- Stygnocoris rusticus (Fallen 1807)
- Stygnocoris sabulosus (Schilling 1829)
- Taphropeltus contractus (Herrich-Schäffer 1835)
- Trapezonotus arenarius (Linnaeus 1758)

==== Family Piesmatidae (ash-grey leaf bugs) ====
  - Parapiesma quadratum (Fieber 1844)
  - Piesma maculatum (Laporte 1833)
