= List of Psallus species =

This is a list of 162 species in Psallus, a genus of plant bugs in the family Miridae.

== Psallus species ==
- Psallus aethiops (Zetterstedt, 1840)^{i c g}
- Psallus aetnicola Wagner, 1955^{c g}
- Psallus albicinctus (Kirschbaum, 1856)^{c g}
- Psallus aldanensis Vinokurov, 1985^{c g}
- Psallus ambiguus (Fallén, 1807)^{c g}
- Psallus amoenus Josifov, 1983^{c g}
- Psallus amygdali Linnavuori, 1998^{c g}
- Psallus anaemicus Seidenstucker, 1966^{c g}
- Psallus anatolicus Wagner, 1963^{c g}
- Psallus anticus (Reuter, 1876)^{c g}
- Psallus apoplecticus Seidenstucker, 1966^{c g}
- Psallus argyrotrichus Fieber, 1861^{c g}
- Psallus asperus Van Duzee, 1923^{i g}
- Psallus assimilis Stichel, 1956^{c g}
- Psallus asthenicus Seidenstucker, 1966^{c g}
- Psallus ater Josifov, 1983^{c g}
- Psallus aterrimus Yasunaga and Vinokurov, 2000^{c g}
- Psallus atratus Josifov, 1983^{c g}
- Psallus aurora (Mulsant and Rey, 1852)^{c g}
- Psallus bagjonicus Josifov, 1983^{c g}
- Psallus balcanicus Josifov, 1969^{c g}
- Psallus bernardi Wagner, 1958^{c g}
- Psallus betuleti (Fallén, 1829)^{i c g}
- Psallus bivitreus (Mulsant and Rey, 1852)^{c g}
- Psallus brachycerus Reuter, 1904^{c g}
- Psallus breviceps Reuter, 1909^{i c g}
- Psallus buddha Yasunaga, 2010^{c g}
- Psallus calliprinoi Carapezza, 2002^{c g}
- Psallus callunae Reuter, 1878^{c g}
- Psallus castaneae Josifov, 1983^{c g}
- Psallus catalanicus Wagner, 1965^{c g}
- Psallus cerridis Wagner, 1971^{c g}
- Psallus chrysopsilus Reuter, 1878^{c g}
- Psallus cinnabarinus Kerzhner, 1979^{c g}
- Psallus clarus Kerzhner, 1988^{c g}
- Psallus collaris (Wagner, 1975)^{c}
- Psallus confusus Rieger, 1981^{c g}
- Psallus crataegi Kulik, 1973^{c g}
- Psallus criocoroides Reuter, 1879^{c g}
- Psallus cruentatus (Mulsant and Rey, 1852)^{c g}
- Psallus cyprius Wagner, 1977^{c g}
- Psallus dichrous Kerzhner, 1962^{c g}
- Psallus difficilis Odhiambo, 1959^{c g}
- Psallus dilutipes Reuter, 1907^{c g}
- Psallus dilutus Fieber, 1858^{c g}
- Psallus divergens Reuter, 1899^{c g}
- Psallus drosopoulosi Linnavuori, 1992^{c g}
- Psallus edoensis Yasunaga and Vinokurov, 2000^{c g}
- Psallus ericetorum Reuter, 1899^{c g}
- Psallus ermolenkoi Kerzhner, 1979^{c g}
- Psallus ernesti Duwal & Lee, 2012^{g}
- Psallus eximius Reuter, 1904^{c g}
- Psallus fagi Drapolyuk, 1990^{c g}
- Psallus falleni Reuter, 1883^{i c g b}
- Psallus faniae Josifov, 1974^{c g}
- Psallus flavellus Stichel, 1933^{i c g}
- Psallus flavescens Kerzhner, 1988^{c g}
- Psallus flavipes (Reuter, 1899)^{c g}
- Psallus fokkeri Reuter, 1899^{c g}
- Psallus fortis Li and Liu, 2007^{c g}
- Psallus fukienanus Zheng and H. Li., 1990^{c g}
- Psallus fuscatus Knight, 1923^{i g}
- Psallus fuscopunctatus Knight, 1930^{i}
- Psallus galilaeus Linnavuori, 1965^{c g}
- Psallus georgicus Zaitzeva, 1968^{c g}
- Psallus gidajatovi Drapolyuk, 1987^{c g}
- Psallus graminicola (Zetterstedt, 1828)^{c g}
- Psallus guttatus Zheng and H. Li., 1990^{c g}
- Psallus haematodes (Gmelin, 1788)^{c g b}
- Psallus halidi Drapolyuk, 1991^{c g}
- Psallus hani Zheng and H. Li., 1990^{c g}
- Psallus hartigi Wagner, 1970^{c g}
- Psallus hastatus Carapezza, 2002^{c g}
- Psallus helenae Josifov, 1969^{c g}
- Psallus henanensis Li and Liu, 2007^{c g}
- Psallus henschii Reuter, 1888^{c g}
- Psallus holomelas Reuter, 1906^{c g}
- Psallus injensis Duwal^{g}
- Psallus jeitensis Wagner, 1963^{c g}
- Psallus jungaricus Vinokurov and Luo, 2012^{c g}
- Psallus jurorum Linnavuori, 1975^{c g}
- Psallus karakardes Seidenstucker, 1959^{c g}
- Psallus kerzhneri Josifov, 1992^{c g}
- Psallus kiritshenkoi Zaitzeva, 1968^{c g}
- Psallus koreanus Josifov, 1983^{c g}
- Psallus kurseongensis Distant, 1910^{c g}
- Psallus lapponicus Reuter, 1874^{c g}
- Psallus laricinus Vinokurov, 1982^{c g}
- Psallus laticeps Reuter, 1878^{c g}
- Psallus lentigo Seidenstucker, 1972^{c g}
- Psallus lepidus Fieber, 1858^{i c g}
- Psallus loginovae Kerzhner, 1988^{c g}
- Psallus lucanicus Wagner, 1968^{c g}
- Psallus luridus Reuter, 1878^{c g}
- Psallus luteicornis (Villers, 1789)^{c g}
- Psallus maculosus Knight, 1925^{i}
- Psallus mali Zheng and H. Li., 1990^{c g}
- Psallus melpomene (Linnavuori, 1989)^{c g}
- Psallus michaili Kerzhner and Schuh, 1995^{c g}
- Psallus milenae Josifov, 1974^{c g}
- Psallus minusculus Zaitzeva, 1968^{c g}
- Psallus miyamotoi Yasunaga and Vinokurov, 2000^{c g}
- Psallus mollis (Mulsant and Rey, 1852)^{c g}
- Psallus montanus Josifov, 1973^{c g}
- Psallus nigricornis Yasunaga and Vinokurov, 2000^{c g}
- Psallus nigripilis (Reuter, 1888)^{c g}
- Psallus ninurta (Linnavuori, 1984)^{c g}
- Psallus nipponicus Vinokurov, 1998^{c g}
- Psallus ocularis (Mulsant and Rey, 1852)^{c g}
- Psallus oenderi Wagner, 1976^{c g}
- Psallus oleae Wagner, 1963^{c g}
- Psallus orni Wagner, 1968^{c g}
- Psallus oyashimanus Yasunaga and Vinokurov, 2000^{c g}
- Psallus pardalis Seidenstucker, 1966^{c g}
- Psallus perrisi (Mulsant and Rey, 1852)^{c g}
- Psallus piceae Reuter, 1878^{c g}
- Psallus pinicola Reuter, 1875^{c g}
- Psallus pseudoambiguus Wagner, 1970^{c g}
- Psallus pseudoplatani Reichling, 1984^{c g}
- Psallus pseudopunctulatus Linnavuori, 1984^{c g}
- Psallus pseudoquercus Josifov, 1974^{c g}
- Psallus pullus Yasunaga and Vinokurov, 2000^{c g}
- Psallus punctulatus Puton, 1874^{c g}
- Psallus quercicola (Reuter, 1904)^{c g}
- Psallus quercus (Kirschbaum, 1856)^{c g}
- Psallus roseoguttatus Yasunaga and Vinokurov, 2000^{c g}
- Psallus roseus (Fabricius, 1777)^{i}
- Psallus rubinicterus Seidenstucker, 1966^{c g}
- Psallus rubromaculosus Knight, 1935^{c g}
- Psallus sachaensis Vinokurov, 1998^{c g}
- Psallus salicicola Schwartz and Kelton, 1990^{i}
- Psallus salicis (Kirschbaum, 1856)^{c g}
- Psallus samdzijonicus Josifov, 1983^{c g}
- Psallus samedovi Drapolyuk, 1991^{c g}
- Psallus samoanus Knight, 1935^{c g}
- Psallus sanguinarius Kerzhner and Josifov, 1999^{c g}
- Psallus shulsangaricus Linnavuori, 2010^{c g}
- Psallus siculus Reuter, 1875^{c g}
- Psallus skylla Linnavuori, 1994^{c g}
- Psallus sorbi Wagner, 1970^{c g}
- Psallus stackelbergi Kerzhner, 1988^{c g}
- Psallus svidae Drapolyuk, 1991^{c g}
- Psallus syriacus (Reuter, 1883)^{c g}
- Psallus taehwana Duwal^{g}
- Psallus takaii Yasunaga and Vinokurov, 2000^{c g}
- Psallus tesongsanicus Josifov, 1983^{c g}
- Psallus tibialis Reuter, 1894^{c g}
- Psallus tonnaichanus Muramoto, 1973^{c g}
- Psallus transcaucasicus Zaitzeva, 1966^{c g}
- Psallus tristis (Blanchard, 1852)^{c g}
- Psallus turcicus Wagner, 1971^{c g}
- Psallus ulmi Kerzhner and Josifov, 1966^{c g}
- Psallus ussuriensis Kerzhner, 1979^{c g}
- Psallus vaccinicola Knight, 1930^{i}
- Psallus variabilis (Fallén, 1807)^{i c g b}
- Psallus varians (Herrich-Schaeffer, 1841)^{c g}
- Psallus vicinus Reuter, 1899^{c g}
- Psallus vittatus (Fieber, 1861)^{c g}
- Psallus wagneri Ossiannilsson, 1953^{c g}
- Psallus yasunagai Vinokurov, 1998^{c g}
- Psallus yongdaeri Duwal^{g}
- Psallus zakatalensis Drapolyuk, 1991^{c g}

Data sources: i = ITIS, c = Catalogue of Life, g = GBIF, b = Bugguide.net
