= List of Plinthisus species =

Lygaeoidea Species File lists these 98 species in Plinthisus, a genus of dirt-colored seed bugs in the family Rhyparochromidae.

== Plinthisus species ==
- Plinthisus acanthothorax Kiritshenko, 1931
- Plinthisus acrocephalus Slater & Sweet, 1977
- Plinthisus afer Horvath, 1906
- Plinthisus alpinus Linnavuori, 1978
- Plinthisus americanus Van Duzee, 1910
- Plinthisus andalusicus Wagner, 1963
- Plinthisus angulatus Horvath, 1876
- Plinthisus australiensis Slater & Sweet, 1977
- Plinthisus basilewskyi Scudder, 1962
- Plinthisus bassianus Slater & Sweet, 1977
- Plinthisus bembidioides Josifov & Kerzhner, 1978
- Plinthisus beniamaricus Linnavuori, 1978
- Plinthisus brachyoccus Sweet & Slater, 2004
- Plinthisus brevipennis (Latreille, 1807)
- Plinthisus brunneus (Distant, 1918)
- Plinthisus canariensis Wagner, 1963
- Plinthisus cautus Popov, 1965
- Plinthisus cerinus Putschkov, 1976
- Plinthisus chilensis Slater, 1971
- Plinthisus compactus (Uhler, 1904)
- Plinthisus convexus Fieber, 1864
- Plinthisus coracinus Horvath, 1876
- Plinthisus dampieris Slater & Sweet, 1977
- Plinthisus daneghanus Linnavuori & van Harten, 2000
- Plinthisus debaroensis Linnavuori, 1989
- Plinthisus drakensbergensis Sweet & Slater, 2004
- Plinthisus ericae Sweet & Slater, 2004
- Plinthisus fasciatus Horvath, 1882
- Plinthisus flavipes Fieber, 1861
- Plinthisus flindersi (Slater & Sweet, 1977)
- Plinthisus fynbosi Sweet & Slater, 2004
- Plinthisus grossi (Slater & Sweet, 1977)
- Plinthisus hebeiensis Zheng, 1981
- Plinthisus herbarum Lindberg, 1958
- Plinthisus heteroclitus Matocq & Pluot-Sigwalt, 2013
- Plinthisus himyaritus Linnavuori, 1978
- Plinthisus hirsutus Slater, 1964
- Plinthisus hirtus Zheng, 1981
- Plinthisus indentatus Barber, 1918
- Plinthisus japonicus (Hidaka, 1962)
- Plinthisus jordiribesi Rieger & Pagola-Carte, 2011
- Plinthisus kangarooensis Slater & Sweet, 1977
- Plinthisus kanyukovae Vinokurov, 1981
- Plinthisus kilimensis Horvath, 1906
- Plinthisus laevigatus Puton, 1884
- Plinthisus laevis Linnavuori, 1978
- Plinthisus lamprus Sweet & Slater, 2004
- Plinthisus lativentris Horvath, 1906
- Plinthisus lepineyi Vidal, 1940
- Plinthisus longicollis Fieber, 1861
- Plinthisus longisetosus Barber, 1918
- Plinthisus lucidus Linnavuori, 1978
- Plinthisus maculatus (Kiritshenko, 1931)
- Plinthisus magnieni Pericart & Ribes, 1994
- Plinthisus major Horvath, 1876
- Plinthisus marginatus Ferrari, 1874
- Plinthisus martini Van Duzee, 1921
- Plinthisus megacephalus Horvath, 1876
- Plinthisus mehadiensis Horvath, 1882
- Plinthisus minutissimus (Fieber, 1864)
- Plinthisus mixtus Kiritshenko, 1951
- Plinthisus mullewa Slater & Sweet, 1977
- Plinthisus muticus Slater, 1964
- Plinthisus neotropicalis Slater, 1971
- Plinthisus noctivagus (Linnavuori, 1978)
- Plinthisus nudus Slater & Sweet, 1977
- Plinthisus obsoletus Horvath, 1886
- Plinthisus otini Vidal, 1951
- Plinthisus pallens Linnavuori, 1978
- Plinthisus pallidus Barber, 1918
- Plinthisus parviceps (Wagner, 1961)
- Plinthisus parvioculatus Slater, 1971
- Plinthisus patruelis Horvath, 1914
- Plinthisus peninsularis Sweet & Slater, 2004
- Plinthisus perpusillus Wagner, 1963
- Plinthisus pilosellus Horvath, 1876
- Plinthisus platycephalus Slater & Sweet, 1977
- Plinthisus proteus Scudder, 1962
- Plinthisus ptilioides Puton, 1874
- Plinthisus pulchellus Sweet & Slater, 2004
- Plinthisus pusillus (Scholtz, 1847)
- Plinthisus putoni Horvath, 1876
- Plinthisus pygmaeus Horvath, 1882
- Plinthisus reticulatus Slater & Sweet, 1977
- Plinthisus reyi Puton, 1882
- Plinthisus rudebecki Slater, 1964
- Plinthisus saundersi Horvath, 1893
- Plinthisus scutellatus Zheng, 1981
- Plinthisus sericeus Slater & Sweet, 1977
- Plinthisus soongoricus Kerzhner, 1962
- Plinthisus subtilis Horvath, 1882
- Plinthisus tasmaniensis Slater & Sweet, 1977
- Plinthisus tindalis (Slater & Sweet, 1977)
- Plinthisus tineoides (Distant, 1901)
- Plinthisus vestitus Jakovlev, 1889
- Plinthisus woodwardi Slater & Sweet, 1977
- Plinthisus yunnanus Zheng, 1981
- Plinthisus zuurbergi Sweet & Slater, 2004
