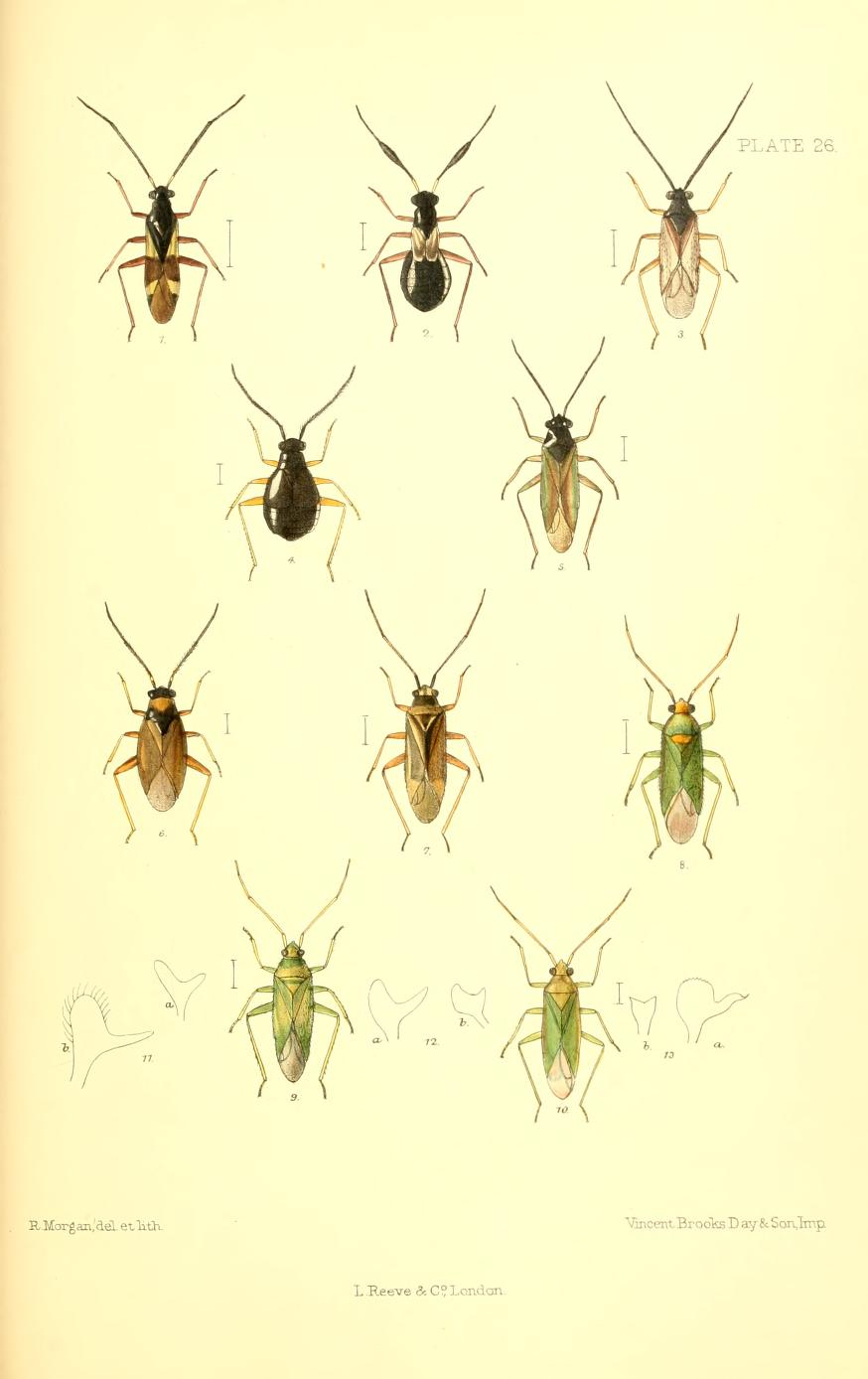
- Orthotylus flavinervis depicted in Edward Saunders figure 8

Scientific classification
- Kingdom: Animalia
- Phylum: Arthropoda
- Clade: Pancrustacea
- Class: Insecta
- Order: Hemiptera
- Suborder: Heteroptera
- Family: Miridae
- Genus: Orthotylus
- Species: O. flavinervis

Binomial name
- Orthotylus flavinervis (Kirschbaum, 1856)

= Orthotylus flavinervis =

Species of insect

Orthotylus flavinervis is a Palearctic species of bug, commonly found on alder and sycamore. Their upper surface is covered in dense and pale hairs, and their wing membrane is observed to be dusky, with yellow veins throughout.
