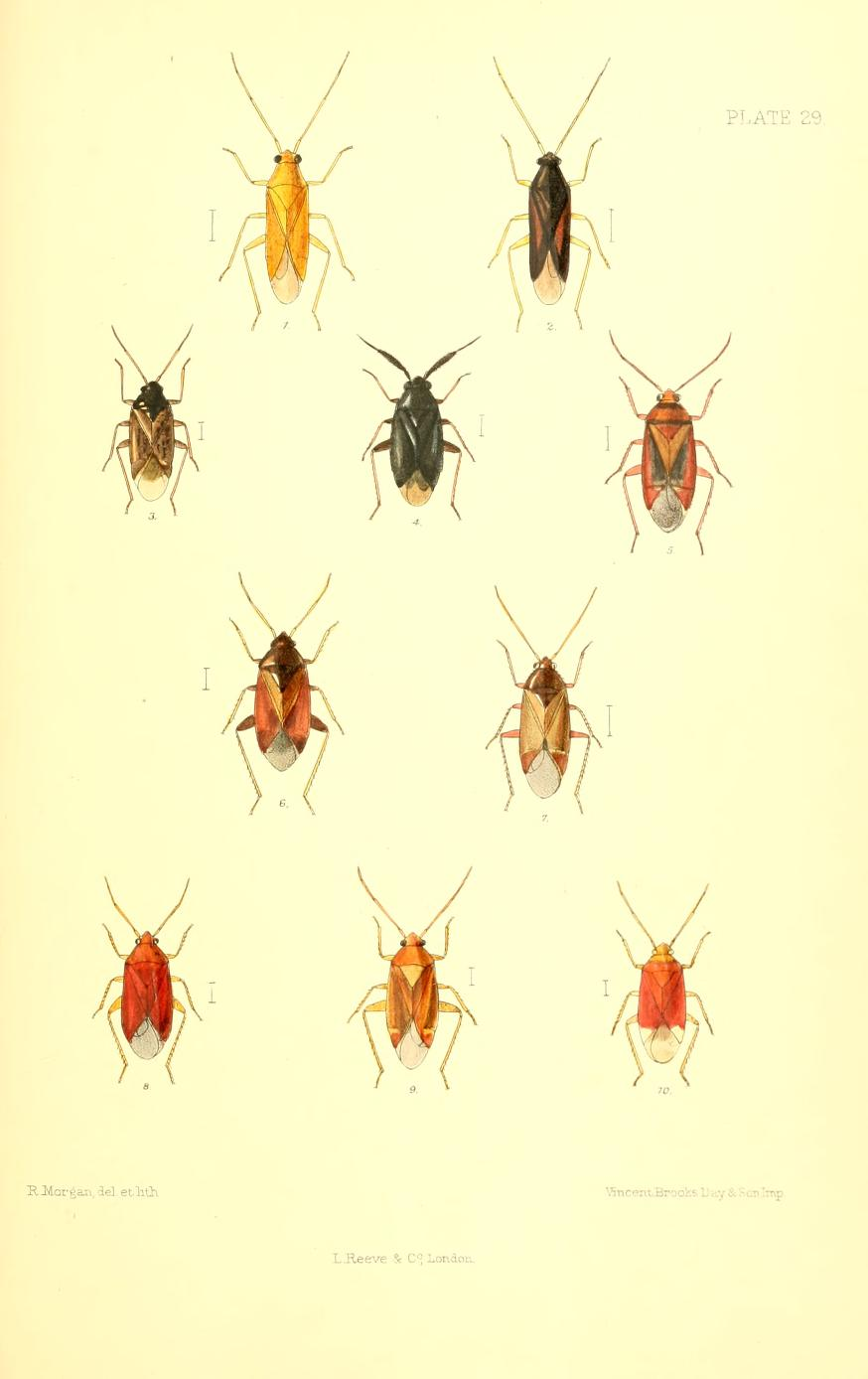
- Psallus quercus depicted in Edward Saunders figure 7

Scientific classification
- Domain: Eukaryota
- Kingdom: Animalia
- Phylum: Arthropoda
- Class: Insecta
- Order: Hemiptera
- Suborder: Heteroptera
- Family: Miridae
- Genus: Psallus
- Species: P. quercus

Binomial name
- Psallus quercus (Kirschbaum, 1856)

= Psallus quercus =

Species of true bug

Psallus quercus is a Palearctic species of true bug.
