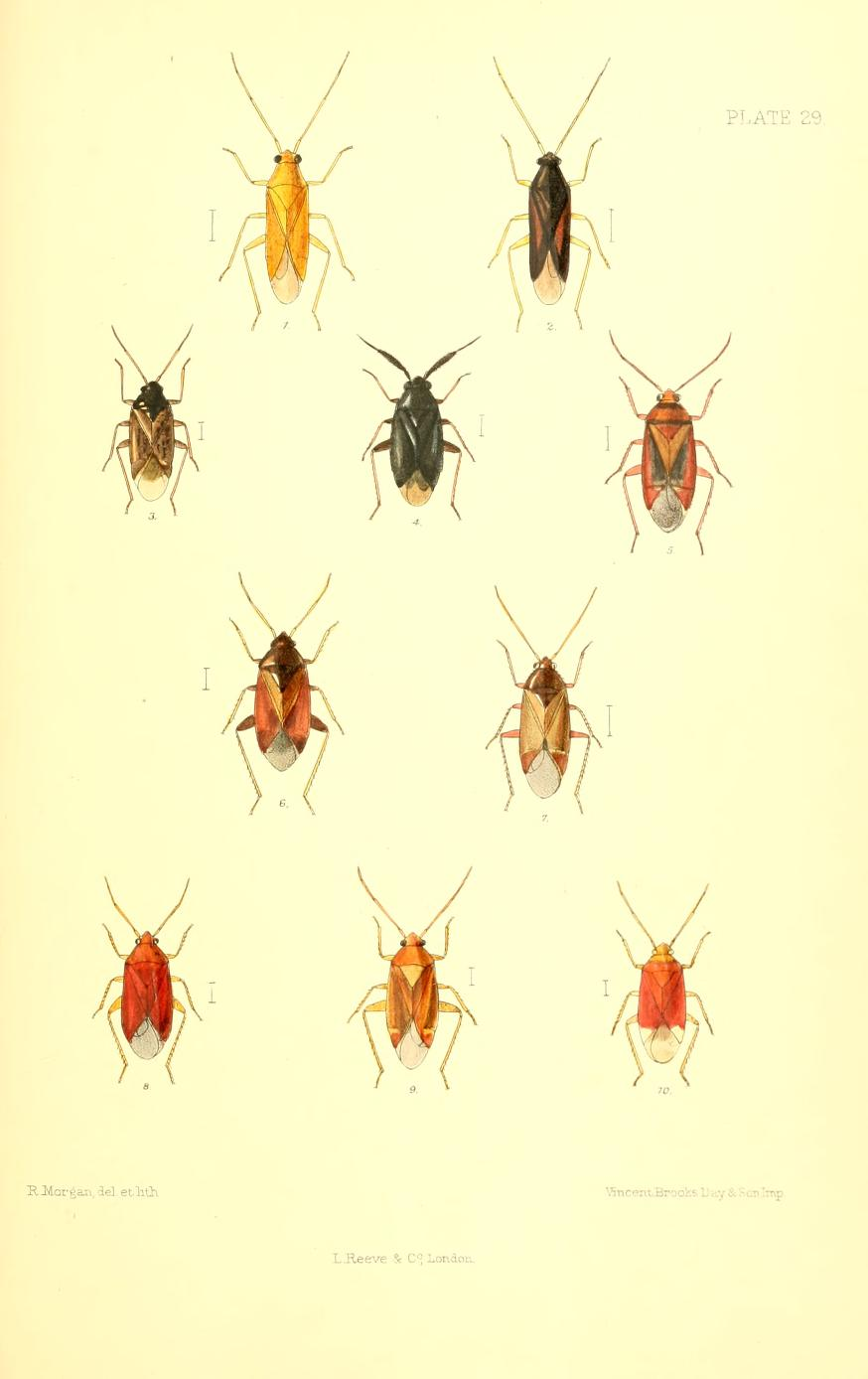
- Psallus salicis depicted in Edward Saunders figure 8

Scientific classification
- Kingdom: Animalia
- Phylum: Arthropoda
- Clade: Pancrustacea
- Class: Insecta
- Order: Hemiptera
- Suborder: Heteroptera
- Family: Miridae
- Genus: Psallus
- Species: P. salicis

Binomial name
- Psallus salicis (Kirschbaum, 1856)

= Psallus salicis =

Species of true bug

Psallus salicis is a Palearctic species of true bug.
