= Plinthisus martini =

Scientific classification
- Domain: Eukaryota
- Kingdom: Animalia
- Phylum: Arthropoda
- Class: Insecta
- Order: Hemiptera
- Suborder: Heteroptera
- Family: Rhyparochromidae
- Genus: Plinthisus
- Species: P. martini

Binomial name
- Plinthisus martini Van Duzee, 1921

Species of true bug

Plinthisus martini is a species of dirt-colored seed bug in the family Rhyparochromidae. It is found in North America.
