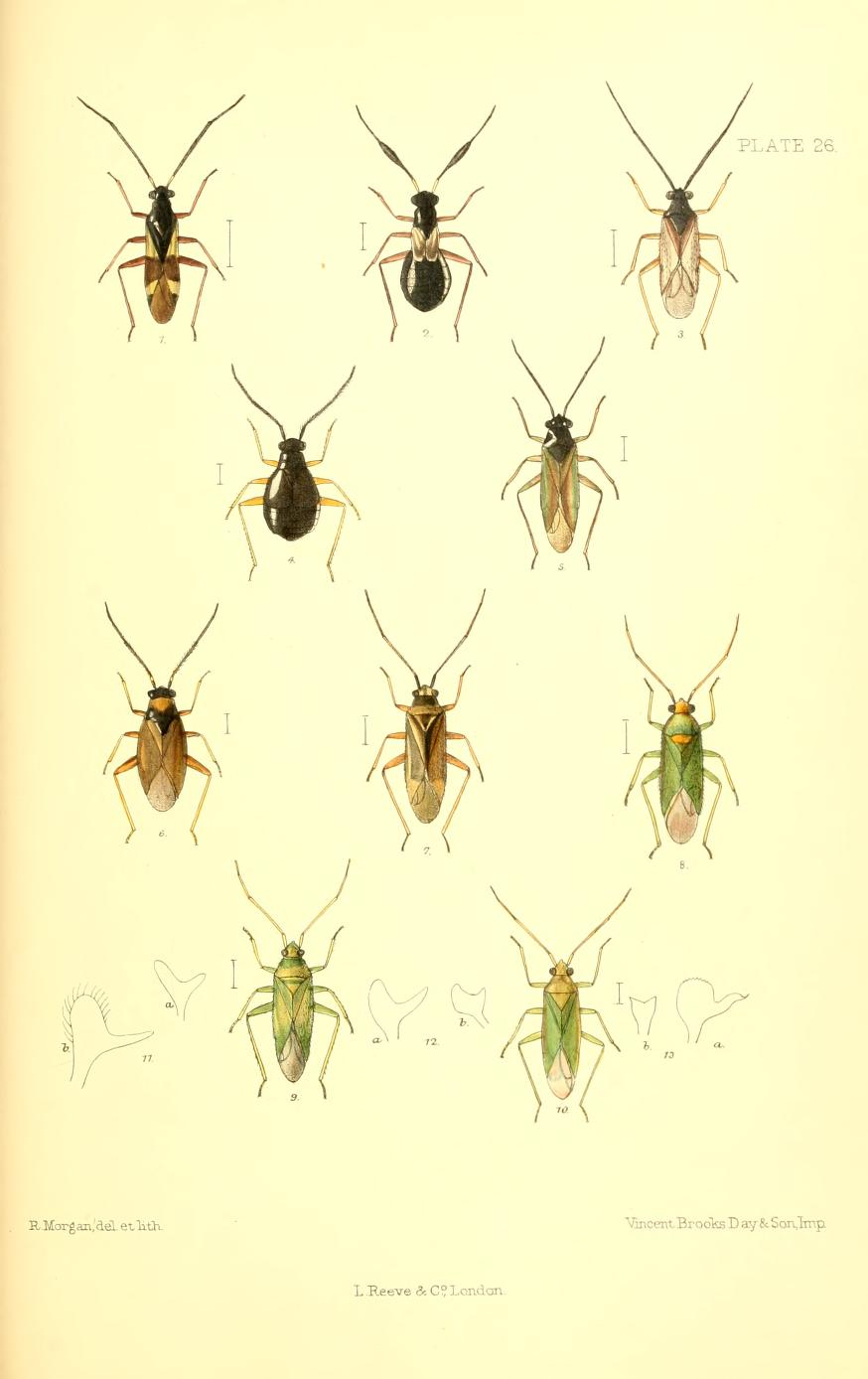
- Orthotylus prasinus depicted in Edward Saunders figure 11

Scientific classification
- Kingdom: Animalia
- Phylum: Arthropoda
- Clade: Pancrustacea
- Class: Insecta
- Order: Hemiptera
- Suborder: Heteroptera
- Family: Miridae
- Genus: Orthotylus
- Species: O. prasinus

Binomial name
- Orthotylus prasinus (Fallen, 1826)

= Orthotylus prasinus =

Species of true bug

Orthotylus prasinus is a Palearctic species of true bug.
