= Phytocoris reuteri =

Scientific classification
- Kingdom: Animalia
- Phylum: Arthropoda
- Class: Insecta
- Order: Hemiptera
- Suborder: Heteroptera
- Family: Miridae
- Genus: Phytocoris
- Species: P. reuteri

Binomial name
- Phytocoris reuteri Saunders, 1876

Species of true bug

Phytocoris reuteri is a species of plant bugs belonging to the family Miridae, subfamily Mirinae. It can be found in Austria, Benelux, Bulgaria, Czech Republic, Estonia, France, Germany, Hungary, Poland, Romania, Slovakia, Switzerland, Scandinavia, and all states of former Yugoslavia (except for Bosnia and Herzegovina and North Macedonia).
