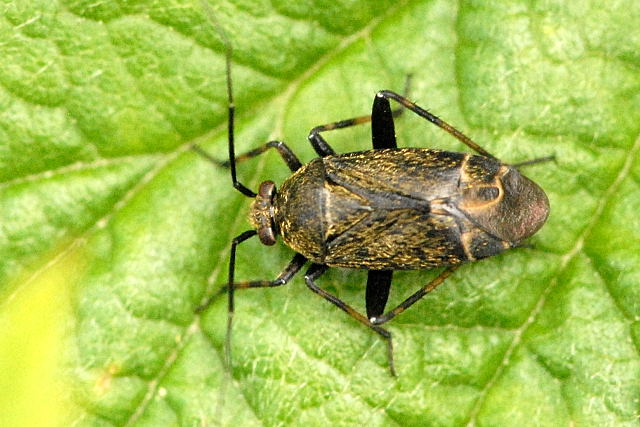
- Psallus ambiguus Ardennes

Scientific classification
- Domain: Eukaryota
- Kingdom: Animalia
- Phylum: Arthropoda
- Class: Insecta
- Order: Hemiptera
- Suborder: Heteroptera
- Family: Miridae
- Genus: Psallus
- Species: P. ambiguus

Binomial name
- Psallus ambiguus (Fallen, 1807)

= Psallus ambiguus =

Species of true bug

Psallus ambiguus is a Palearctic species of true bug.
