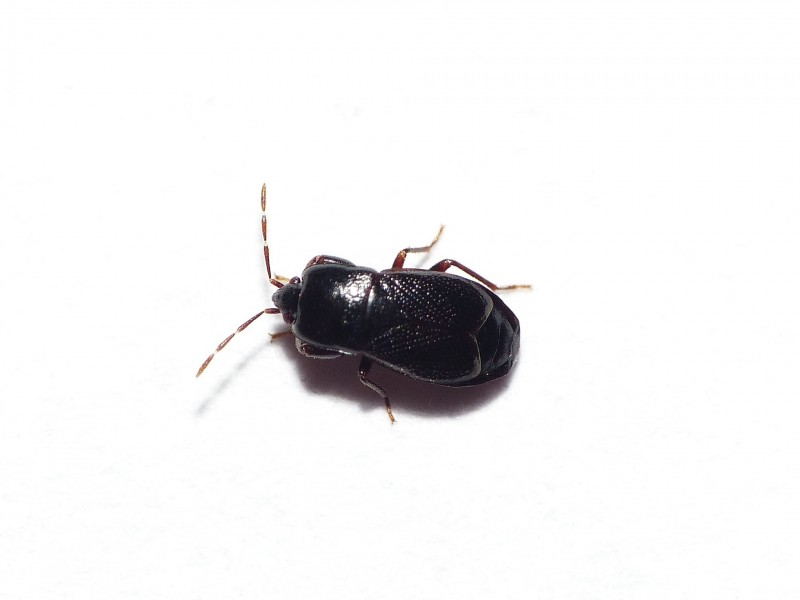

Scientific classification
- Kingdom: Animalia
- Phylum: Arthropoda
- Class: Insecta
- Order: Hemiptera
- Suborder: Heteroptera
- Family: Rhyparochromidae
- Genus: Plinthisus
- Species: P. brevipennis

Binomial name
- Plinthisus brevipennis (Latreille, 1807)

Synonyms
- Lygaeus brevipennis Latreille, 1807

= Plinthisus brevipennis =

Species of true bug

Plinthisus brevipennis is a species of dirt-colored seed bug in the family Rhyparochromidae. It is found in Africa, Europe, and Northern Asia (excluding China).
