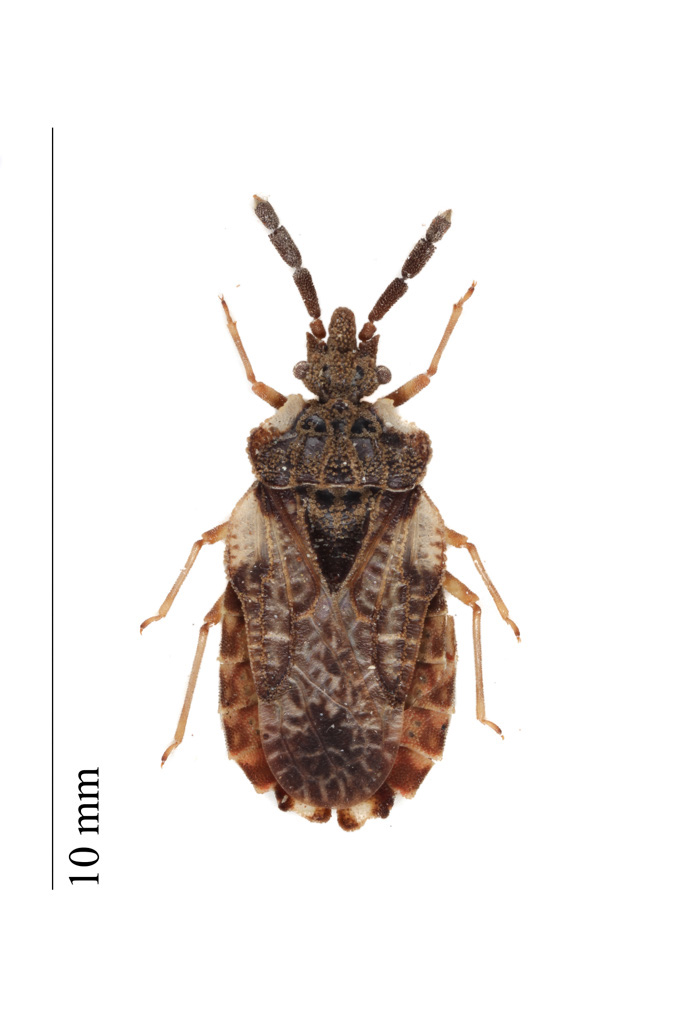

Scientific classification
- Kingdom: Animalia
- Phylum: Arthropoda
- Clade: Pancrustacea
- Class: Insecta
- Order: Hemiptera
- Suborder: Heteroptera
- Family: Aradidae
- Genus: Aradus
- Species: A. depressus

Binomial name
- Aradus depressus (Fabricius, 1794)

= Aradus depressus =

Species of true bug

Aradus depressus is a true bug in the family Aradidae. The species is found in the Palearctic from Ireland East to Siberia. In the Southeast, the range extends to the Caucasus Mountains. A. depressus is the most common species of the genus Aradus and can be found everywhere. In the Alps it occurs up to 1,600 metres (5,200 ft).

Aradus depressus lives in hardwoods infested by fungi, such as Trametes and Oxyporus. Both nymphs and adults prefer birch Betula, but they are also found at Acer, oak Quercus , Elm Ulmus, willow Salix, poplar Populus, beech Fagus, alder Alnus and apples Malus. There are also indications in the literature. that they live exceptionally well on pine Pinus. The females readily fly from mid-April to the end of May, often far away from potential habitats.
