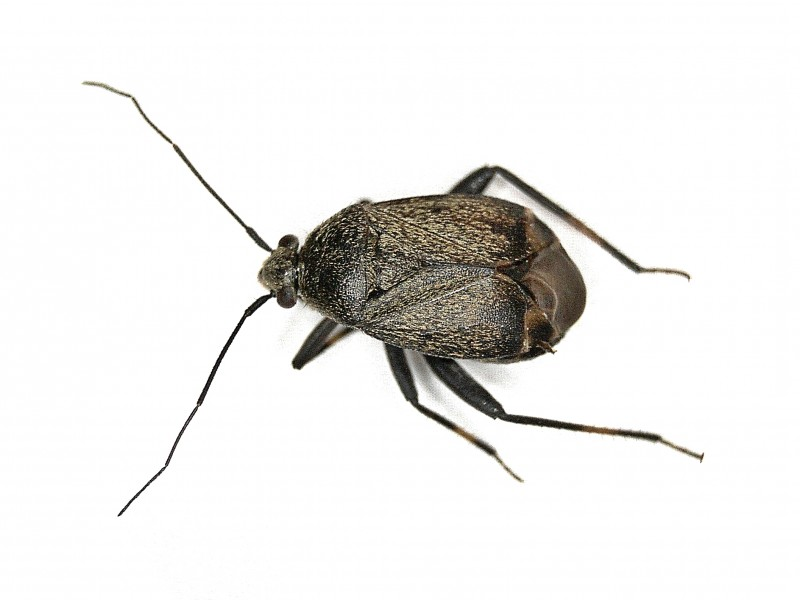
- Polymerus nigrita Arnhem, the Netherlands

Scientific classification
- Kingdom: Animalia
- Phylum: Arthropoda
- Clade: Pancrustacea
- Class: Insecta
- Order: Hemiptera
- Suborder: Heteroptera
- Family: Miridae
- Genus: Polymerus
- Species: P. nigrita

Binomial name
- Polymerus nigrita (Fallén, 1807)

= Polymerus nigrita =

Species of true bug

Polymerus nigrita is a Palearctic species of true bug.
