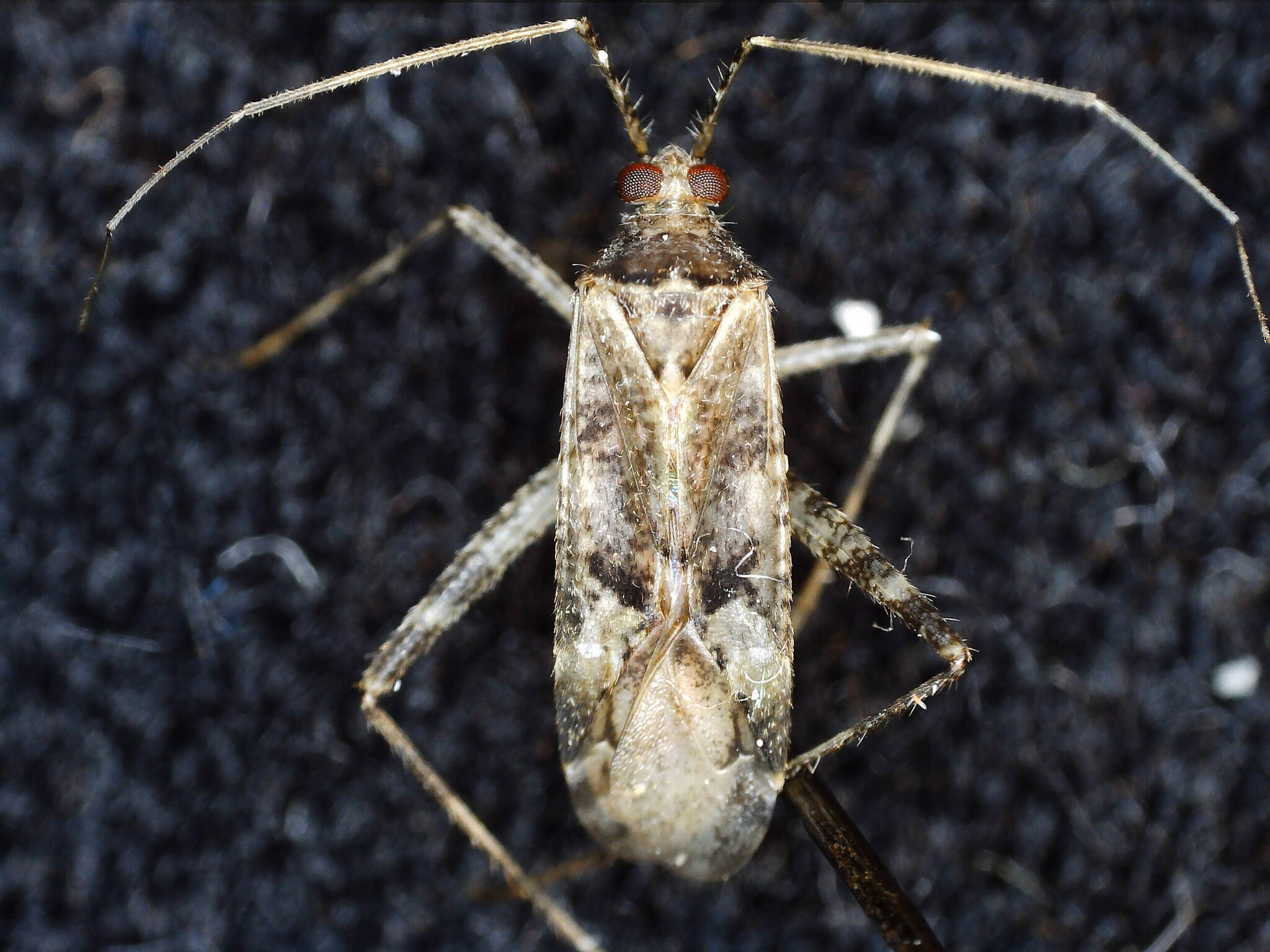

Scientific classification
- Kingdom: Animalia
- Phylum: Arthropoda
- Class: Insecta
- Order: Hemiptera
- Suborder: Heteroptera
- Family: Miridae
- Genus: Phytocoris
- Species: P. longipennis

Binomial name
- Phytocoris longipennis Flor, 1861

= Phytocoris longipennis =

Species of true bug

Phytocoris longipennis is a species of plant bugs belonging to the family Miridae and subfamily Mirinae.

== Description ==
The species have black coloured pronotum with brownish or black upperside. It is 7 millimetres (0.28 in) long.

== Distribution ==
It is found in most parts of Europe. and then East across the Palearctic to Central Asia

== Ecology ==
Phytocoris longipennis is found on deciduous trees where it feeds on mites and other small insects. Flight time is from June to October.
