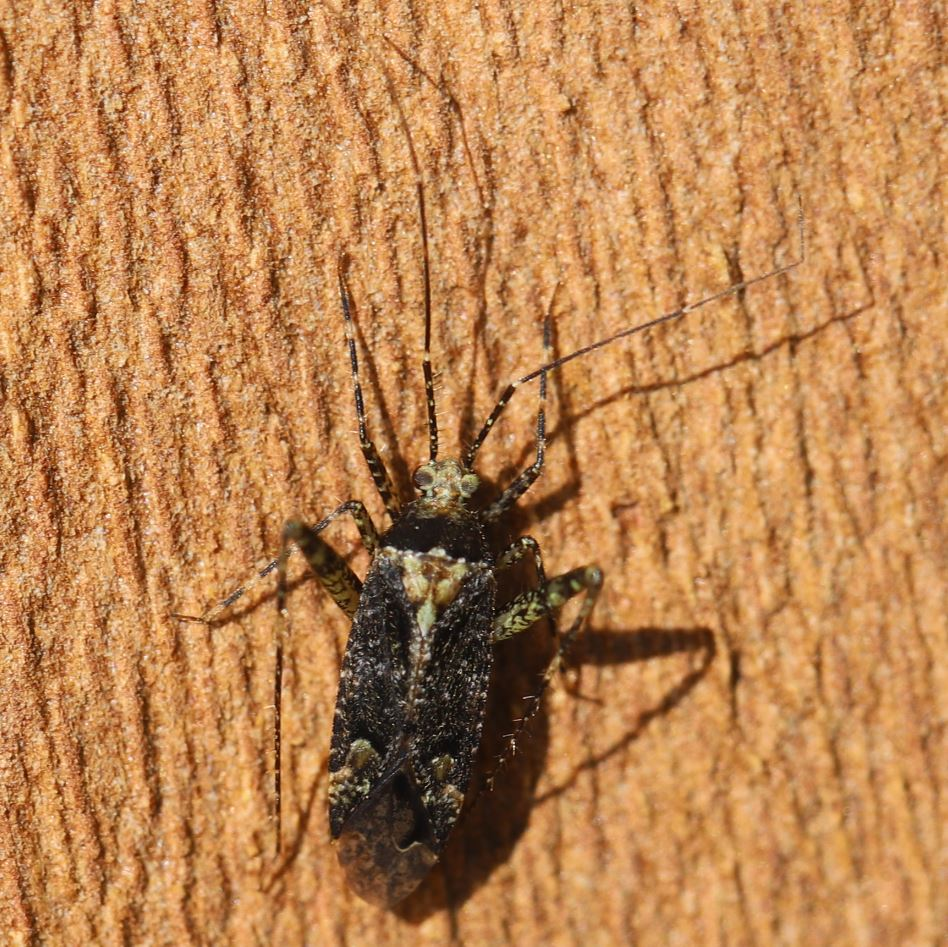

Scientific classification
- Kingdom: Animalia
- Phylum: Arthropoda
- Class: Insecta
- Order: Hemiptera
- Suborder: Heteroptera
- Family: Miridae
- Genus: Phytocoris
- Species: P. dimidiatus

Binomial name
- Phytocoris dimidiatus Kirschbaum, 1856

= Phytocoris dimidiatus =

Species of true bug

Phytocoris dimidiatus is a species of plant bugs belonging to the family Miridae, subfamily Mirinae.

== Description ==
The species have black coloured pronotum with brownish or black upperside. It is 6.5 millimetres (0.26 in) long.

== Distribution ==
It is found in most parts of Europe and then East across the Palearctic to Central Asia

== Ecology ==
Phytocoris dimidiatus is found on deciduous trees, especially oak. Flight time is from June to October.
