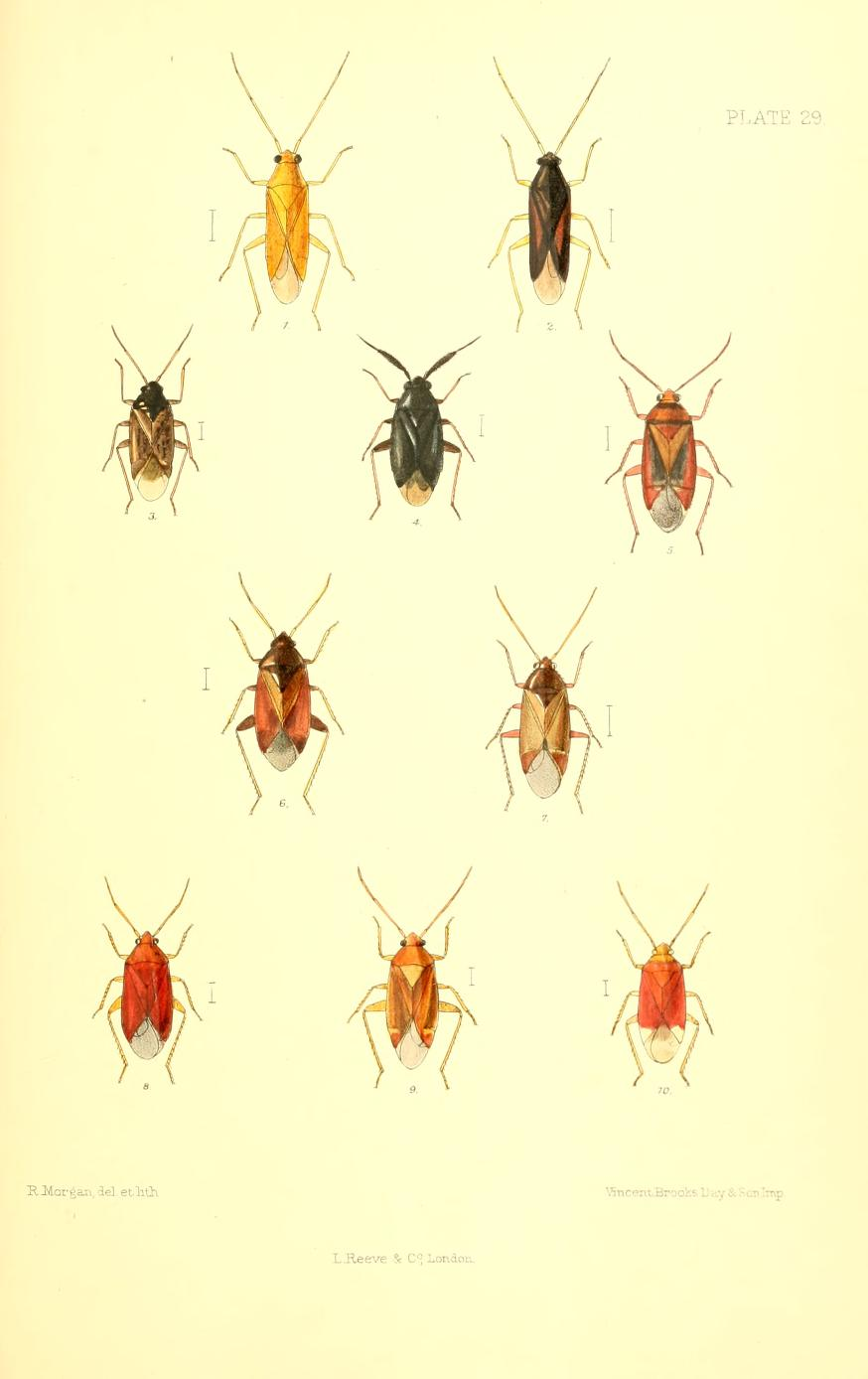
- Plesiodema pinetella depicted in Edward Saunders Hemiptera Heteroptera of the British Islands (figure 3)

Scientific classification
- Domain: Eukaryota
- Kingdom: Animalia
- Phylum: Arthropoda
- Class: Insecta
- Order: Hemiptera
- Suborder: Heteroptera
- Family: Miridae
- Genus: Plesiodema
- Species: P. pinetella

Binomial name
- Plesiodema pinetella (Zetterstedt, 1828)

= Plesiodema pinetella =

Species of true bug

Plesiodema pinetella is a true bug. The species is found across Palearctic from Europe and Western North Africa East to Siberia and Central Asia.

Plesiodema pinetella feeds on Pinus, Picea and Larix but in Central Europe especially on Pinus sylvestris, and Pinus nigra, and at higher altitudes in the Alps on Pinus mugo. The imagines occur from late May to early July, where their life expectancy is only about two weeks.
