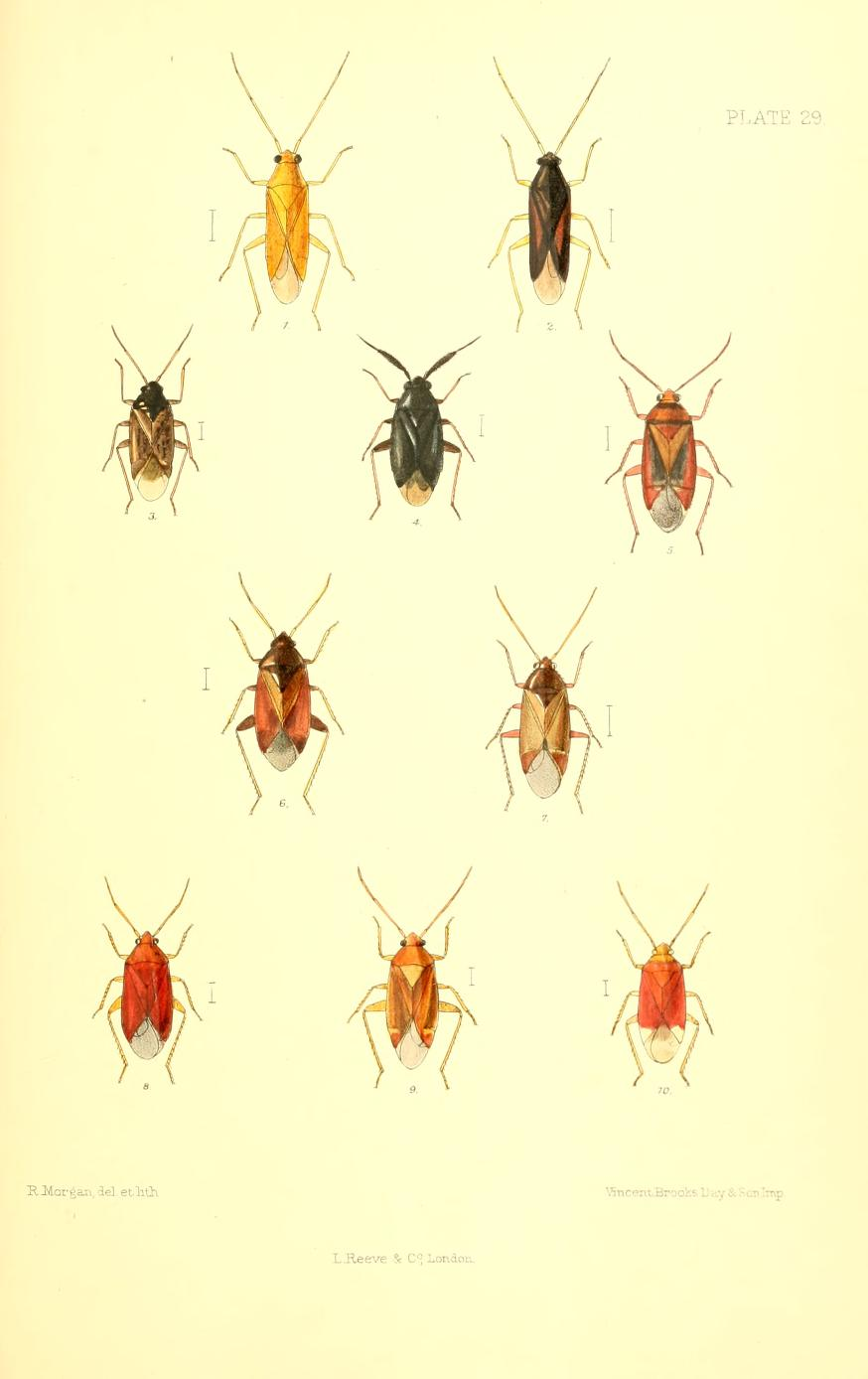
- Psallus haematodes depicted in Edward Saunders Hemiptera Heteroptera of the British Islands (figure 10)

Scientific classification
- Kingdom: Animalia
- Phylum: Arthropoda
- Class: Insecta
- Order: Hemiptera
- Suborder: Heteroptera
- Family: Miridae
- Genus: Psallus
- Species: P. haematodes

Binomial name
- Psallus haematodes (Gmelin, 1790)

= Psallus haematodes =

Species of true bug

Psallus haematodes is a species of true bug. It is primarily distributed in the Palearctic region, occurring extensively throughout Europe, but its presence is limited to the northern parts of the Mediterranean. Its range extends to Siberia and the Caspian region in the east. The species has also been introduced in North America. Psallus haematodes is typically found in various habitats, including open and sunny areas, as well as shady places near wetland edges, rivers, bogs, and even dry environments.

As for its feeding habits, Psallus haematodes primarily feeds on various species of willow (Salix), including Salix caprea, Salix aurita Salix cinerea, Salix repens and Salix viminalis. Adult bugs of this species are commonly observed during the late summer season.
