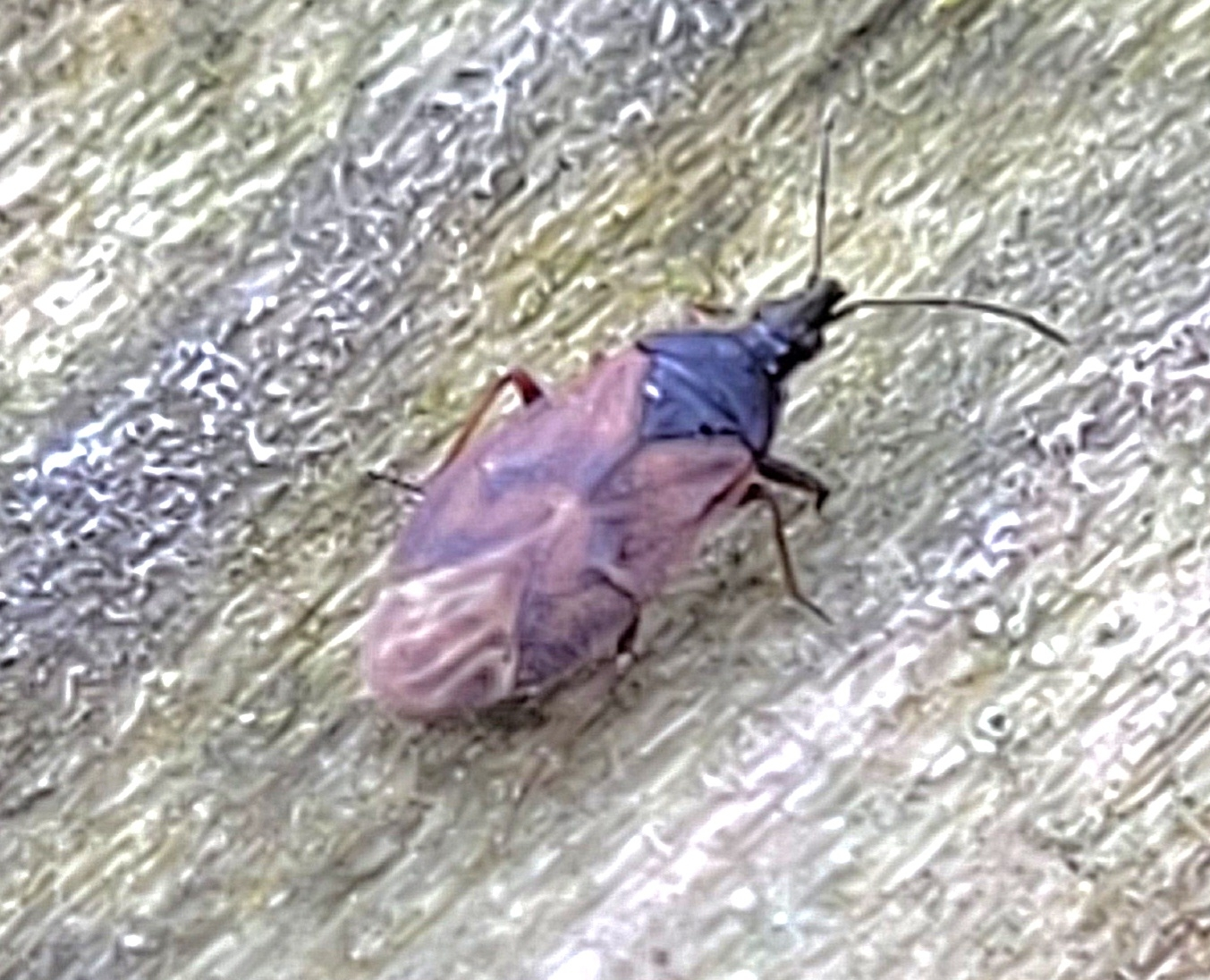

Scientific classification
- Kingdom: Animalia
- Phylum: Arthropoda
- Clade: Pancrustacea
- Class: Insecta
- Order: Hemiptera
- Suborder: Heteroptera
- Family: Anthocoridae
- Genus: Tetraphleps
- Species: T. bicuspis

Binomial name
- Tetraphleps bicuspis (Herrich-Schäffer, 1835)

= Tetraphleps bicuspis =

Species of true bug

Tetraphleps bicuspis is a Palearctic species of true bug. It is predatory.
