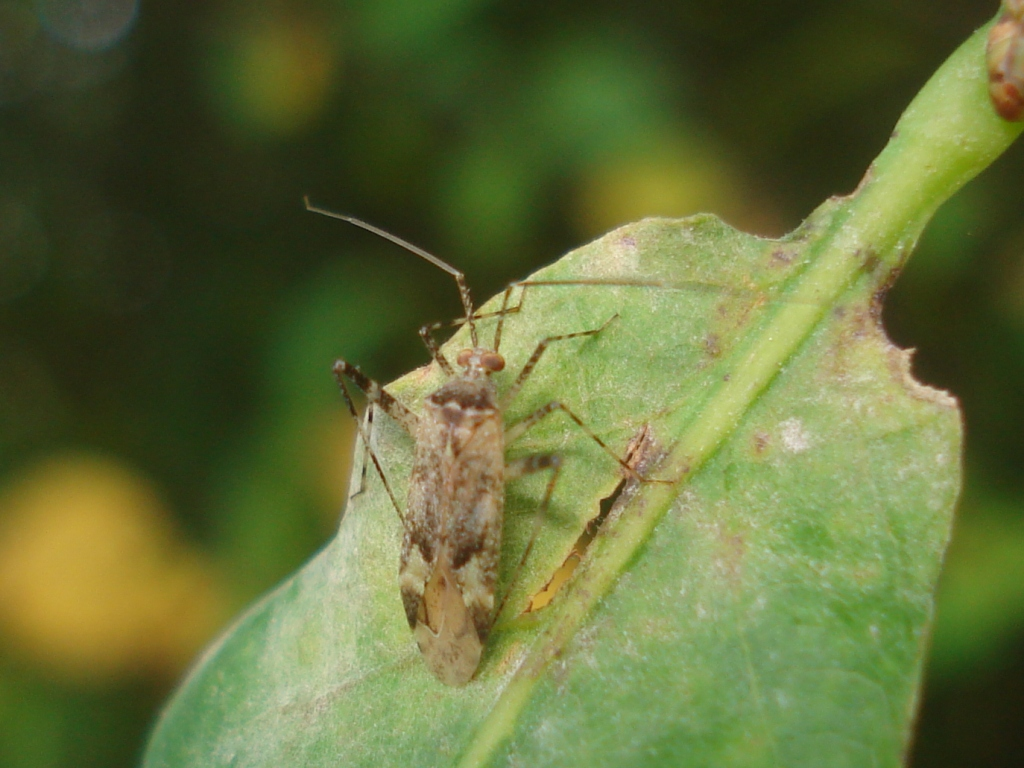
- Phytocoris tiliae

Scientific classification
- Kingdom: Animalia
- Phylum: Arthropoda
- Class: Insecta
- Order: Hemiptera
- Suborder: Heteroptera
- Family: Miridae
- Genus: Phytocoris
- Species: P. tiliae

Binomial name
- Phytocoris tiliae (Fabricius, 1777)

Synonyms
- Cimex tiliae Fabricius, 1777

= Phytocoris tiliae =

Species of true bug

Phytocoris tiliae is a species of plant bugs belonging to the family Miridae, subfamily Mirinae.

== Description ==
The species is greyish-green coloured and is 6–7 millimetres (0.24–0.28 in) long. It has black coloured mottling on the wings with its underside being silver-grey to lime-green.

== Distribution ==
It is mainly absent from Albania, Azores, Bosnia and Herzegovina, Canary Islands, Cyprus, Faroe Islands, Iceland, Lithuania, Madeira, Malta, North Macedonia, and some parts of Russia. then east to the Caucasus.

== Ecology ==
Phytocoris tiliae found on deciduous trees (Tilia, Quercus, Corylus, Populus, Crataegus, Sorbus, Fagus, Malus, Acer, Fraxinus, Salix) where it feeds on mites and other small insects.
