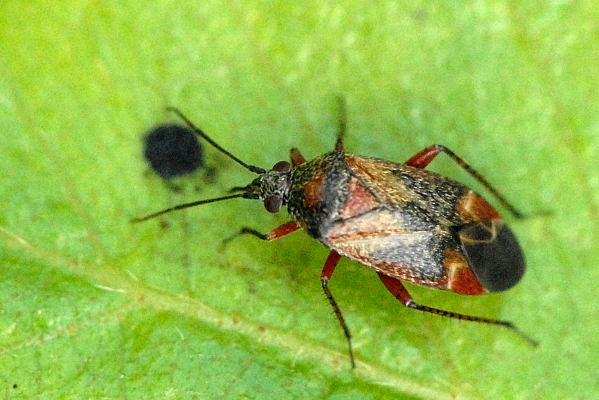
- Psallus betuleti Ardennes

Scientific classification
- Domain: Eukaryota
- Kingdom: Animalia
- Phylum: Arthropoda
- Class: Insecta
- Order: Hemiptera
- Suborder: Heteroptera
- Family: Miridae
- Genus: Psallus
- Species: P. betuleti

Binomial name
- Psallus betuleti (Fallen, 1826)

= Psallus betuleti =

Species of true bug

Psallus betuleti is a Palearctic species of true bug.
