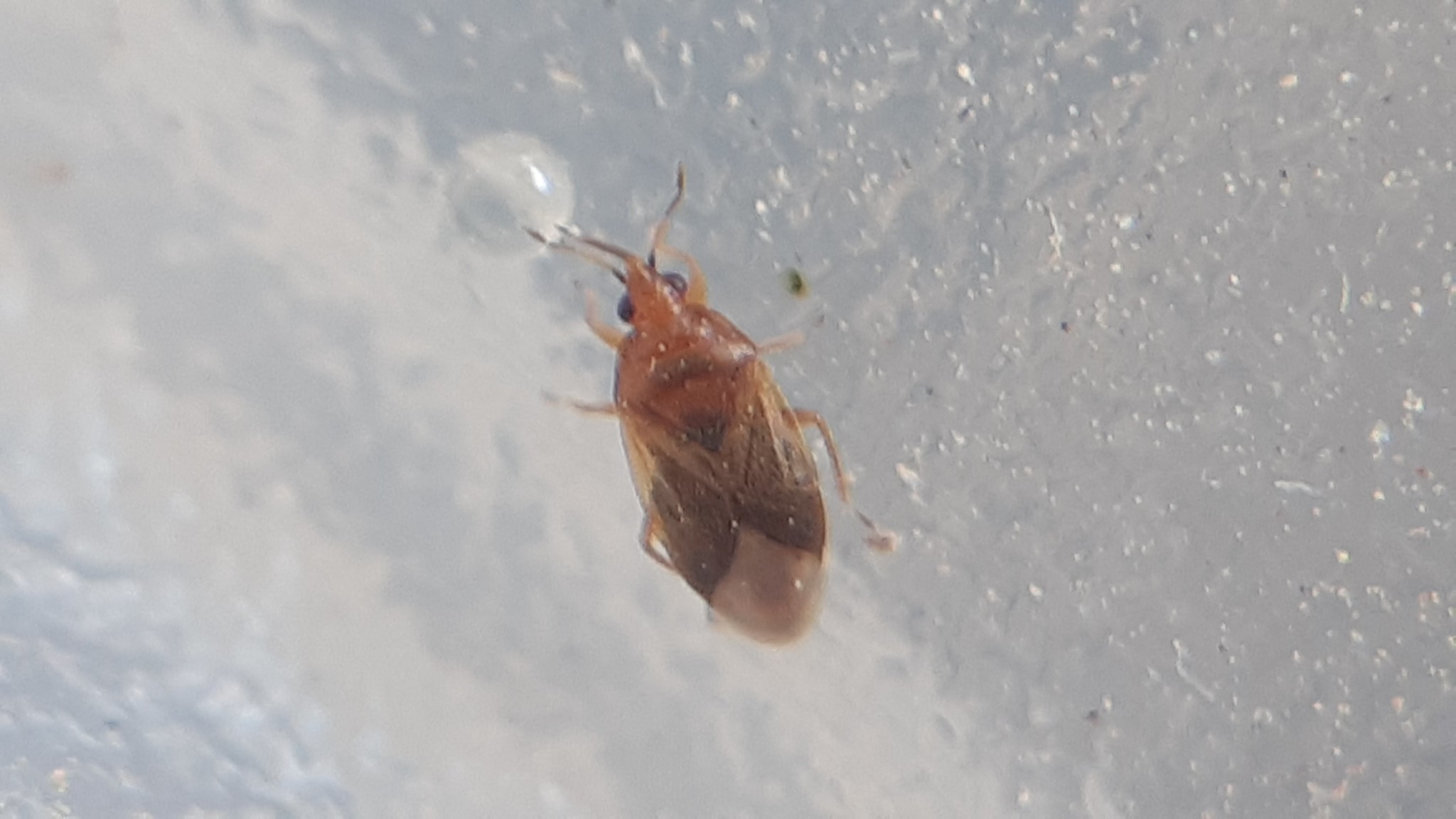

Scientific classification
- Kingdom: Animalia
- Phylum: Arthropoda
- Clade: Pancrustacea
- Class: Insecta
- Order: Hemiptera
- Suborder: Heteroptera
- Family: Anthocoridae
- Genus: Orius
- Species: O. laticollis

Binomial name
- Orius laticollis (Reuter, 1884)

Synonyms
- Orius laticollis subsp. laticollis; Triphleps laticollis Reuter, 1884

= Orius laticollis =

Species of insect

Orius laticollis is a species of true bug in the family Anthocoridae. The species was originally described by Odo Reuter in 1884.
