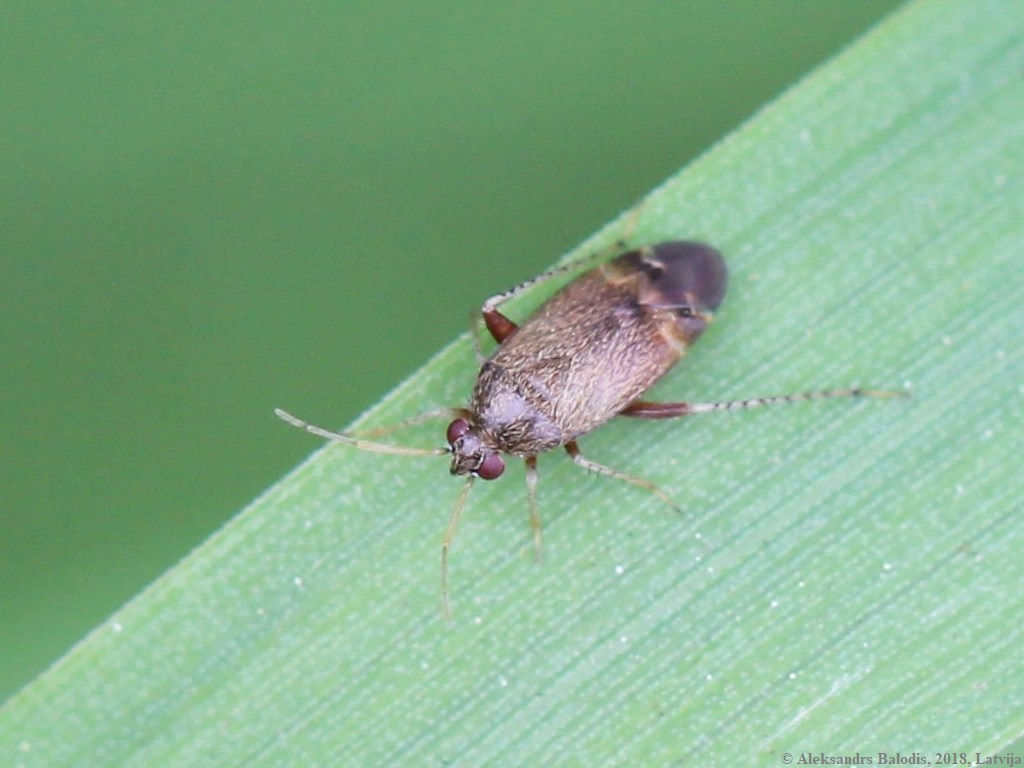
- Psallus perrisi Latvia

Scientific classification
- Domain: Eukaryota
- Kingdom: Animalia
- Phylum: Arthropoda
- Class: Insecta
- Order: Hemiptera
- Suborder: Heteroptera
- Family: Miridae
- Genus: Psallus
- Species: P. perrisi

Binomial name
- Psallus perrisi (Mulsant & Rey, 1852)

= Psallus perrisi =

Species of true bug

Psallus perrisi is a Palearctic species of true bug.
