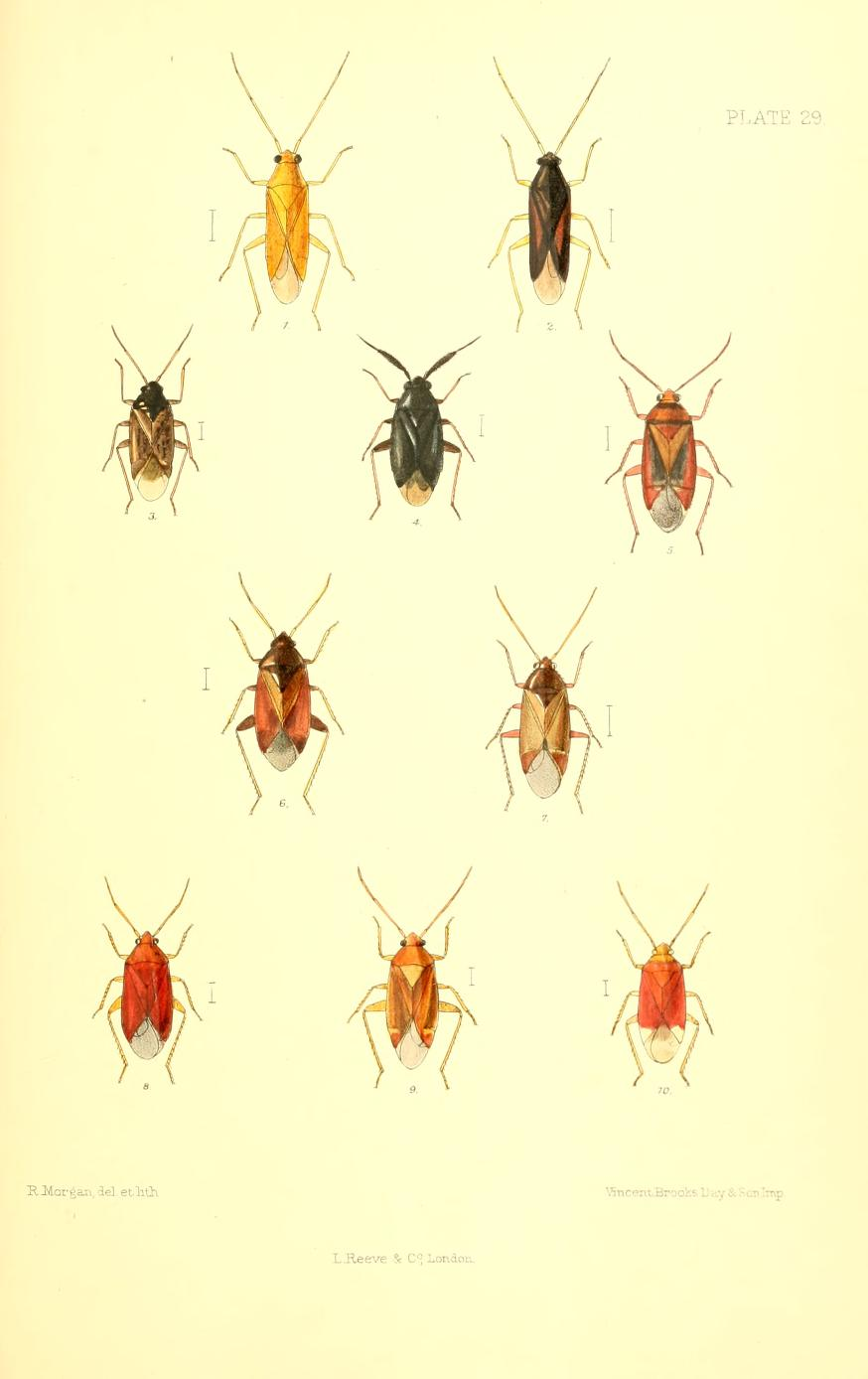
- Psallus variabilis depicted in Edward Saunders Hemiptera Heteroptera of the British Islands (figure 6)

Scientific classification
- Kingdom: Animalia
- Phylum: Arthropoda
- Class: Insecta
- Order: Hemiptera
- Suborder: Heteroptera
- Family: Miridae
- Genus: Psallus
- Species: P. variabilis

Binomial name
- Psallus variabilis (Fallén, 1807)

= Psallus variabilis =

Species of true bug

Psallus variabilis is a species of plant bug in the family Miridae. It is found in the Palearctic and as an adventive species in North America. It feeds on the sap of a variety of forest trees including Quercus, plum and crab apple trees and on rose, raspberry and cranberry.
