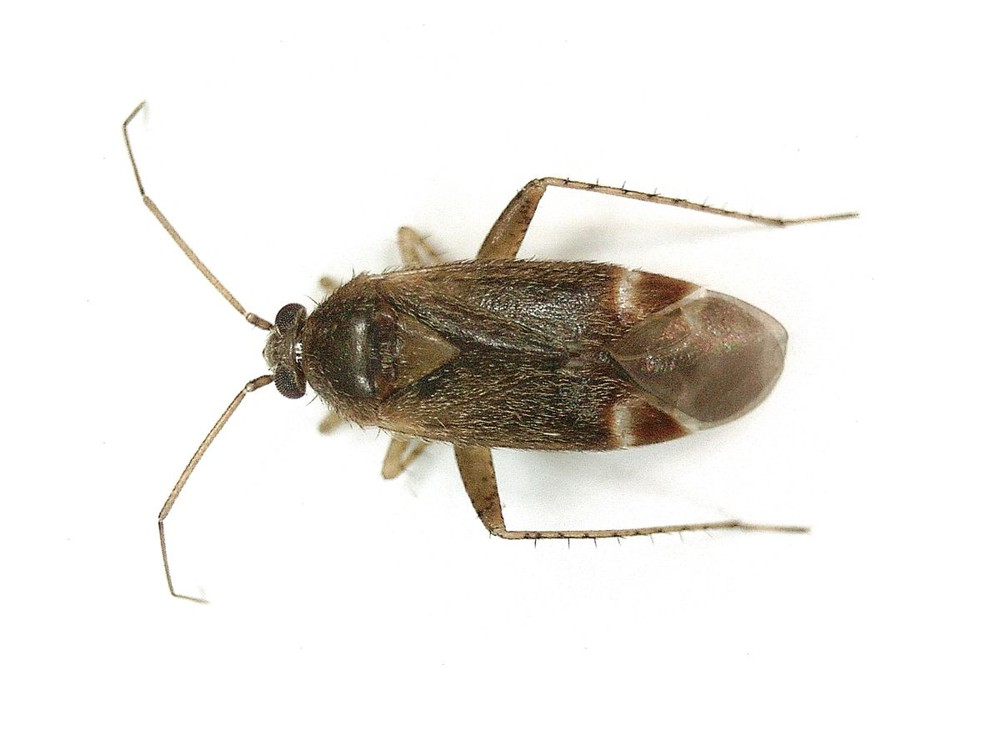
- In Arnhem, Netherlands

Scientific classification
- Domain: Eukaryota
- Kingdom: Animalia
- Phylum: Arthropoda
- Class: Insecta
- Order: Hemiptera
- Suborder: Heteroptera
- Family: Miridae
- Genus: Psallus
- Species: P. varians

Binomial name
- Psallus varians (Herrich-Schäffer, 1841)

= Psallus varians =

Species of true bug

Psallus varians is a Palearctic species of true bug.
