= Psallus falleni =

Scientific classification
- Kingdom: Animalia
- Phylum: Arthropoda
- Class: Insecta
- Order: Hemiptera
- Suborder: Heteroptera
- Family: Miridae
- Genus: Psallus
- Species: P. falleni

Binomial name
- Psallus falleni Reuter, 1883

Species of true bug

Psallus falleni is a species of plant bug in the family Miridae. It is found in Europe including the north Mediterranean basin then east across the Palearctic to Siberia and China. It occurs as an adventive species in North America. Psallus falleni lives on birches ( Betula ). The imagines occur relatively late from July to September
