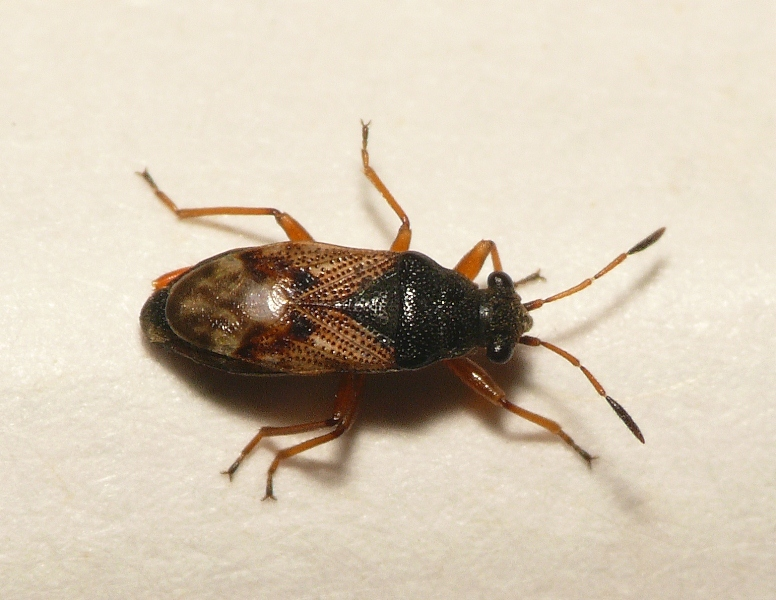

Scientific classification
- Kingdom: Animalia
- Phylum: Arthropoda
- Clade: Pancrustacea
- Class: Insecta
- Order: Hemiptera
- Suborder: Heteroptera
- Family: Rhyparochromidae
- Genus: Acompus
- Species: A. rufipes

Binomial name
- Acompus rufipes (Wolff, 1802)

= Acompus rufipes =

Species of true bug

Acompus rufipes is a species of true bug belonging to the family Rhyparochromidae.

It is native to Europe.
