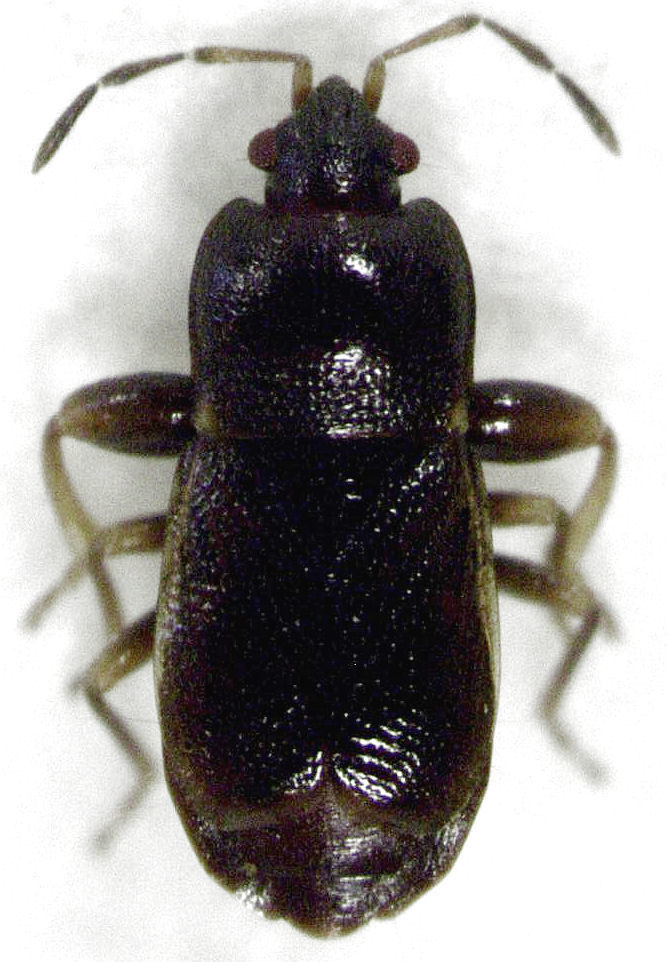
- Plinthisus woodwardi

Scientific classification
- Kingdom: Animalia
- Phylum: Arthropoda
- Class: Insecta
- Order: Hemiptera
- Suborder: Heteroptera
- Family: Rhyparochromidae
- Subfamily: Plinthisinae
- Tribe: Plinthisini
- Genus: Plinthisus; Stephens, 1829

Diversity
- Around 100 species

= Plinthisus =

Genus of true bugs

Plinthisus is a genus of dirt-colored seed bugs in the family Rhyparochromidae. There are around 100 described species in Plinthisus.

== See also ==
- List of Plinthisus species
