= Edward Saunders (entomologist) =

English entomologist

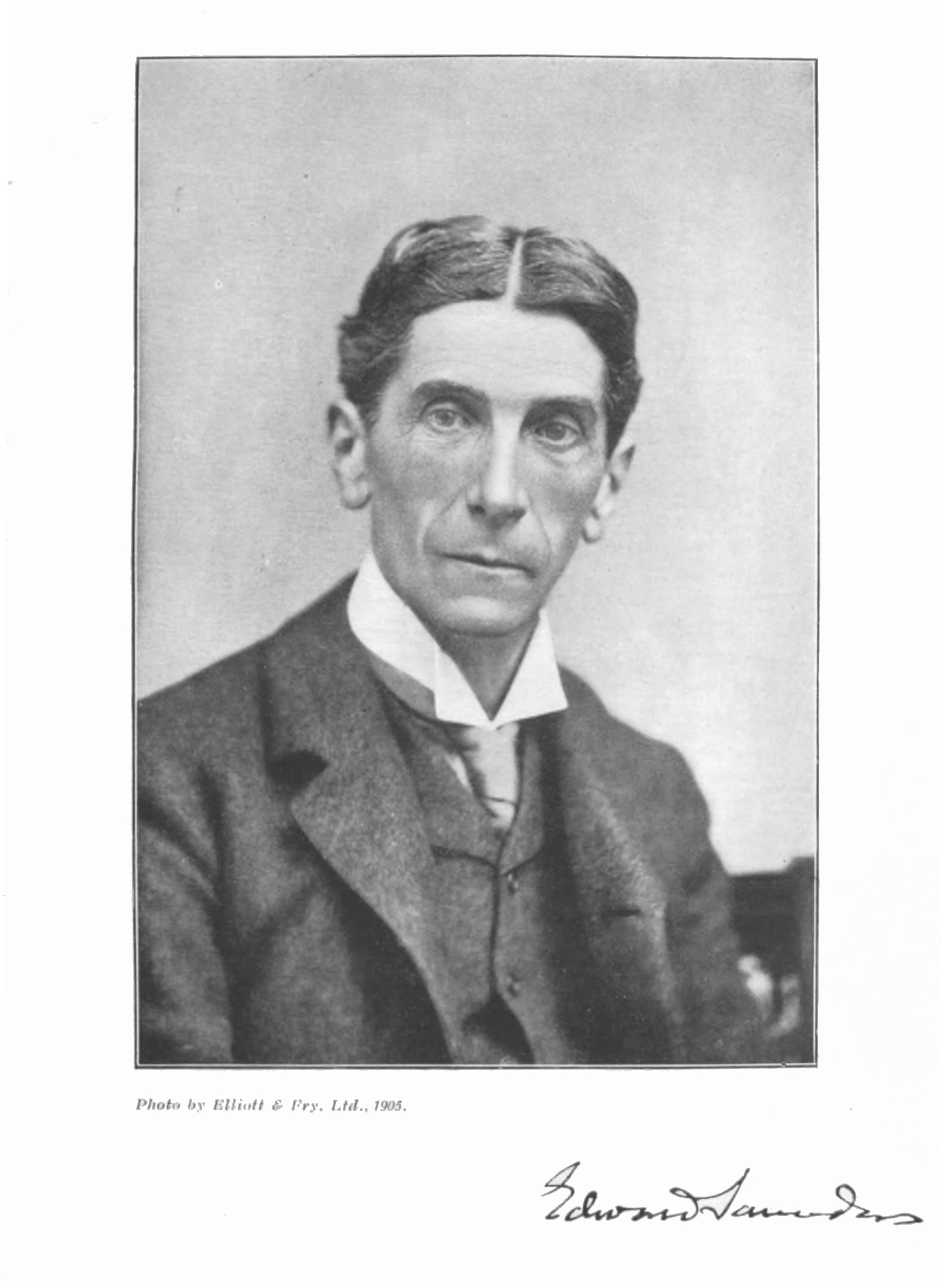
Portrait, c. 1905

Edward Saunders, FRS (22 March 1848 – 6 February 1910) was an English entomologist, who specialised in Coleoptera, Hemiptera and Hymenoptera.

== Life ==
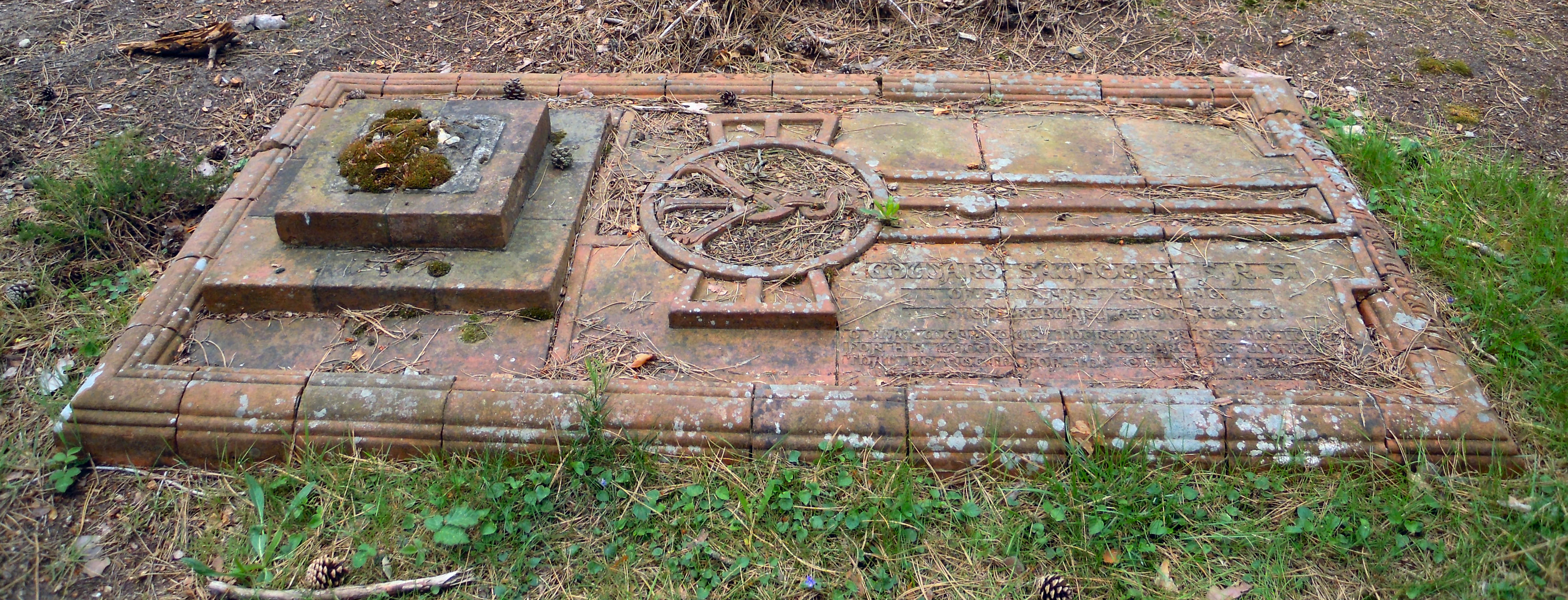
The grave of Edward Saunders in Brookwood Cemetery

Saunders was born at East Hill, Wandsworth, on 22 March 1848, the youngest of seven children of William Wilson Saunders (known for sponsoring the collecting expeditions of Alfred Russel Wallace), who was a treasurer for the Linnean Society. Schooled at Reigate, he was interested in natural history like his siblings. He joined the business of his father at Lloyds Bank, studying entomology in his spare time. His earliest publication was Coleoptera at Lowestoft in the first volume of the Entomologists’ Monthly Magazine when he was sixteen years old. He would later become an editor of the Magazine. His Catalogus Buprestidarum of 1871 was "a work whose importance was immediately recognised, and which has ever since remained a classic. In order to render the synonymies ... as reliable as possible, he undertook the only foreign tour of his life, visiting in succession all the chief museums of Europe and examining personally the types".

Saunders was a Fellow of the Entomological Society, the Linnean Society and the Royal Society (FRS, June 1902). Saunders lived at Reigate, Wandsworth, and Bromley, and settled in Woking in 1887. He married Mary Agnes Brown in 1872 and eight of their twelve children lived beyond him. He died at Bognor on 6 February 1910, and was buried in Brookwood Cemetery.

== Family ==
In 1872, Saunders married Mary Agnes Brown; they had eight sons and four daughters.

== Works ==
Saunders published, with scientific papers in entomological journals:

- 1871 Catalogus Buprestidarum synonymicus et systematicus Janson, London.
- 1892 The Hemiptera Heteroptera of the British IslandsLondon.
- 1896, The Hymenoptera Aculeata of the British Isles London.

== Sources ==
- This article incorporates text from a publication now in the public domain: James, T. E. (1912). "Saunders, Edward". In Lee, Sidney (ed.). Dictionary of National Biography (2nd supplement). London: Smith, Elder & Co.
- Anon. (1910). "Obit". Entomologist's Monthly Magazine. 46: 53.
