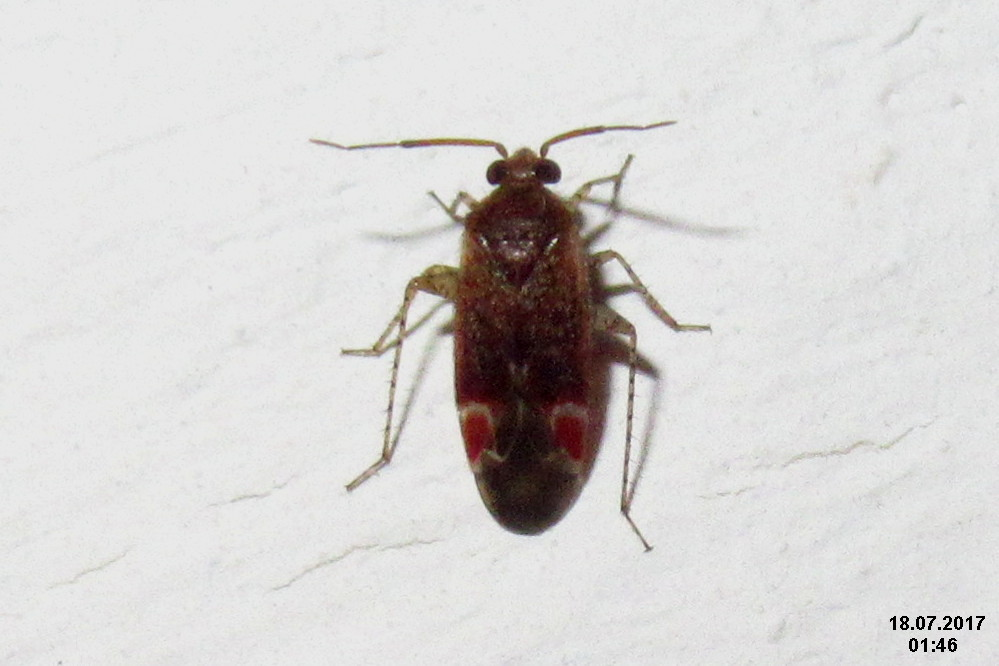

Scientific classification
- Kingdom: Animalia
- Phylum: Arthropoda
- Clade: Pancrustacea
- Class: Insecta
- Order: Hemiptera
- Suborder: Heteroptera
- Family: Miridae
- Subfamily: Phylinae
- Tribe: Phylini
- Genus: Psallus; Fieber, 1858

Diversity
- at least 170 species

Synonyms
- Apocremnus Fieber, 1858

= Psallus =

Genus of true bugs

Psallus is a genus of mostly Palaearctic, Oriental and Nearctic plant bugs in the family Miridae. There are more than 160 described species in Psallus.

== See also ==
- List of Psallus species
