= List of Aphelocheirus species =

A list of Aphelocheirus species. The genus contains 109 species.

== Species ==
=== Subgenus Aphelocheirus ===
- Aphelocheirus aestivalis (Fabricius, 1794)
- Aphelocheirus altigradus Zettel, 1998
- Aphelocheirus amplus Liu & Zheng, 1994
- Aphelocheirus amurensis Kiritshenko, 1925
- Aphelocheirus apicalis Tran & Nguyen, 2016
- Aphelocheirus aschalewi Zettel, 2021
- Aphelocheirus ashlocki D. Polhemus & J. Polhemus, 1989
- Aphelocheirus australis Usinger, 1937
- Aphelocheirus bengkulu D. Polhemus, 1994
- Aphelocheirus bianchii Kiritshenko, 1933
- Aphelocheirus boukali Zettel, 2000
- Aphelocheirus breviceps Horváth, 1895
- Aphelocheirus breviculus Nieser & Chen, 1991
- Aphelocheirus bruneiensis Zettel, Lane & Moore, 2008
- Aphelocheirus brunneus Liu & Zheng, 2000
- Aphelocheirus cantonensis D. Polhemus & J. Polhemus, 1989
- Aphelocheirus carinatus Royer, 1920
- Aphelocheirus celebensis D. Polhemus & J. Polhemus, 1989
- Aphelocheirus corbeti Poisson, 1955
- Aphelocheirus debilis Kiritshenko, 1925
- Aphelocheirus denticeps Montandon, 1919
- Aphelocheirus dudgeoni D. Polhemus & J. Polhemus, 1989
- Aphelocheirus ellipsoideus Liu & Ding, 2005
- Aphelocheirus fang D. Polhemus & J. Polhemus, 1989
- Aphelocheirus femoratus D. Polhemus & J. Polhemus, 1989
- Aphelocheirus fischeri Zettel, 2009
- Aphelocheirus flavinotatus Tran & Nguyen, 2016
- Aphelocheirus freitagi Zettel & Pangantihon, 2010
- Aphelocheirus gapudi Zettel, 1999
- Aphelocheirus geros Nieser & Chen, 1996
- Aphelocheirus goellnerae Zettel, 2012
- Aphelocheirus grik D. Polhemus & J. Polhemus, 1989
- Aphelocheirus gularis Horváth, 1918
- Aphelocheirus gusenleitneri Zettel, 2009
- Aphelocheirus hainanensis Zettel, 1998
- Aphelocheirus improcerus Kiritshenko, 1929
- Aphelocheirus inops Horváth, 1918
- Aphelocheirus javanicus D. Polhemus & J. Polhemus, 1989
- Aphelocheirus jendeki Zettel, 1998
- Aphelocheirus karen Sites & Zettel, 2005
- Aphelocheirus kawamurae Matsumura, 1915
- Aphelocheirus kaygieyess Sites et al., 2011
- Aphelocheirus kedirius Nieser et al., 2004
- Aphelocheirus kelabitensis Zettel, 1993
- Aphelocheirus kinabalu D. Polhemus & J. Polhemus, 1989
- Aphelocheirus kodadai Zettel, 1999
- Aphelocheirus kolenatii Kiritshenko, 1925
- Aphelocheirus kra Sites, 2006
- Aphelocheirus kumbanus Linnavuori, 1975
- Aphelocheirus lahu D. Polhemus & J. Polhemus, 1989
- Aphelocheirus lao D. Polhemus & J. Polhemus, 1989
- Aphelocheirus longidentatus Liu & Ding, 2005
- Aphelocheirus longlingensis Xie & Liu, 2014
- Aphelocheirus lorelindu D. Polhemus & J. Polhemus, 1989
- Aphelocheirus lugubris Horváth, 1899
- Aphelocheirus luteus Liu & Ding, 2005
- Aphelocheirus maculosus Liu & Zheng, 1994
- Aphelocheirus madli Zettel, 2002
- Aphelocheirus maehongsonus Sites & Zettel, 2005
- Aphelocheirus malayanus D. Polhemus & J. Polhemus, 1989
- Aphelocheirus menglaensis Xie & Liu, 2015
- Aphelocheirus minor D. Polhemus & J. Polhemus, 1989
- Aphelocheirus montandoni Xie & Liu, 2015
- Aphelocheirus monthathanus Sites & Zettel, 2005
- Aphelocheirus motuoensis Xie & Liu, 2014
- Aphelocheirus murcius Nieser & Millán, 1989
- Aphelocheirus narmadaensis Thirumalai, 2008
- Aphelocheirus nathani La Rivers, 1971
- Aphelocheirus nawae Matsumura, 1905
- Aphelocheirus nepalensis Zettel, 1998
- Aphelocheirus nigrita Horváth, 1899
- Aphelocheirus occidentalis Nieser & Millán, 1989
- Aphelocheirus palawanensis D. Polhemus & J. Polhemus, 1989
- Aphelocheirus pallens Horváth, 1899
- Aphelocheirus pemae Millán, L'mohdi & Carbonell, 2016
- Aphelocheirus petersi D. Polhemus & J. Polhemus, 1989
- Aphelocheirus philippinensis Usinger, 1938
- Aphelocheirus plumipes (Oshanin, 1909)
- Aphelocheirus pradhanae Zettel, 1998
- Aphelocheirus robustus Nieser & Chen, 1991
- Aphelocheirus rotroui Bergevin, 1925
- Aphelocheirus sapa Tran & Nguyen, 2016
- Aphelocheirus schoutedeni Montandon, 1914
- Aphelocheirus sculpturatus D. Polhemus & J. Polhemus, 1989
- Aphelocheirus similaris D. Polhemus & J. Polhemus, 1989
- Aphelocheirus sinensis Montandon, 1892
- Aphelocheirus siriphumus Sites, 2006
- Aphelocheirus starmuehlneri Zettel, 2009
- Aphelocheirus tesselatus Sites, 2006
- Aphelocheirus thai D. Polhemus & J. Polhemus, 1989
- Aphelocheirus thirumalaii Basu, Subramanian & Saha, 2013
- Aphelocheirus tuberculipes Zettel & Tran, 2009
- Aphelocheirus tuleari Poisson, 1963
- Aphelocheirus uichancoi Usinger, 1938
- Aphelocheirus ussuriensis Kiritshenko, 1929
- Aphelocheirus venus Zettel, 1999
- Aphelocheirus vittatus Matsumura, 1905
- Aphelocheirus yasumatsui Miyamoto, 1960
- Aphelocheirus zamboanga D. Polhemus & J. Polhemus, 1989

=== Subgenus Micraphelocheirus ===
- Aphelocheirus asiaticus (Hoberland & Stys, 1979)
- Aphelocheirus bernhardti Zettel & Papácek, 2006
- Aphelocheirus brevirostris D. Polhemus & J. Polhemus, 1989
- Aphelocheirus clivicolus J. Polhemus, 1979
- Aphelocheirus jaechi Zettel & Papácek, 2006
- Aphelocheirus malayensis Zettel & Papácek, 2006
- Aphelocheirus pygmaeus La Rivers, 1971
- Aphelocheirus signatus Zettel, 1998
- Aphelocheirus trani Zettel & Papácek, 2006
