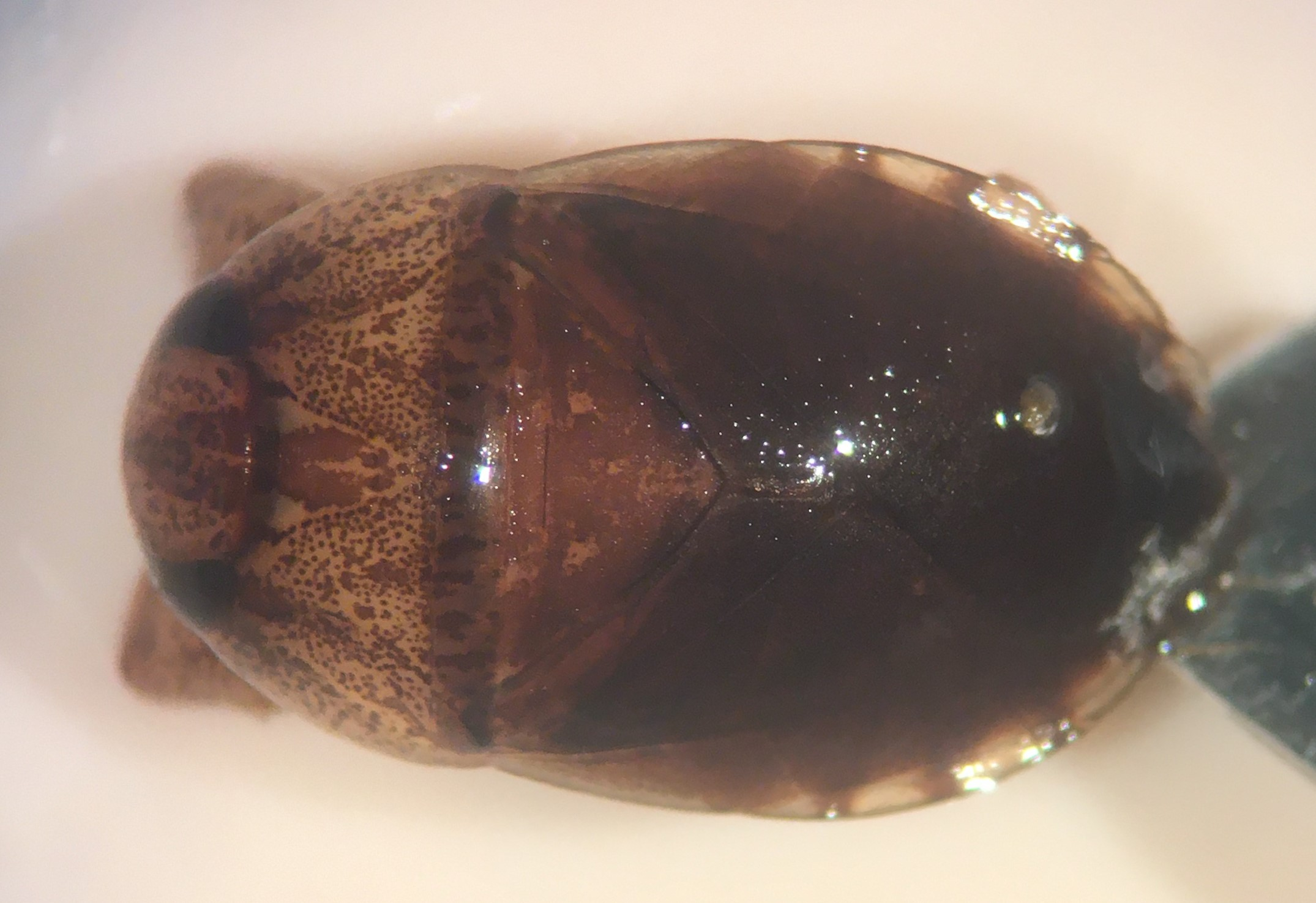

Scientific classification
- Domain: Eukaryota
- Kingdom: Animalia
- Phylum: Arthropoda
- Class: Insecta
- Order: Hemiptera
- Suborder: Heteroptera
- Family: Naucoridae
- Genus: Pelocoris
- Species: P. balius

Binomial name
- Pelocoris balius La Rivers, 1970

Synonyms
- Pelocoris femoratus balius La Rivers, 1970

= Pelocoris balius =

Species of true bug

Pelocoris balius is a species of creeping water bug in the family Naucoridae. It is found in Florida. In the Everglades, P. balius is locally common in shorter hydroperiod sites.

Pelocoris balius was originally described as a subspecies of P. femoratus by Ira La Rivers in 1970, but it was elevated to species by Robert Sites in 2015.
