= Pelocoris biimpressus =

Scientific classification
- Domain: Eukaryota
- Kingdom: Animalia
- Phylum: Arthropoda
- Class: Insecta
- Order: Hemiptera
- Suborder: Heteroptera
- Family: Naucoridae
- Genus: Pelocoris
- Species: P. biimpressus

Binomial name
- Pelocoris biimpressus Montandon, 1898

Species of true bug

Pelocoris biimpressus is a species of creeping water bug in the family Naucoridae. It is found in North America and has two subspecies: P. biimpressus biimpressus and P. biimpressus shoshone.
