= Ambrysus californicus =

Scientific classification
- Domain: Eukaryota
- Kingdom: Animalia
- Phylum: Arthropoda
- Class: Insecta
- Order: Hemiptera
- Suborder: Heteroptera
- Family: Naucoridae
- Genus: Ambrysus
- Species: A. californicus

Binomial name
- Ambrysus californicus Montandon, 1897

Species of true bug

Ambrysus californicus is a species of creeping water bug in the family Naucoridae. It is found in North America.

== Subspecies ==
These two subspecies belong to the species Ambrysus californicus:

- Ambrysus californicus bohartorum Usinger, 1946
- Ambrysus californicus californicus Montandon, 1897
