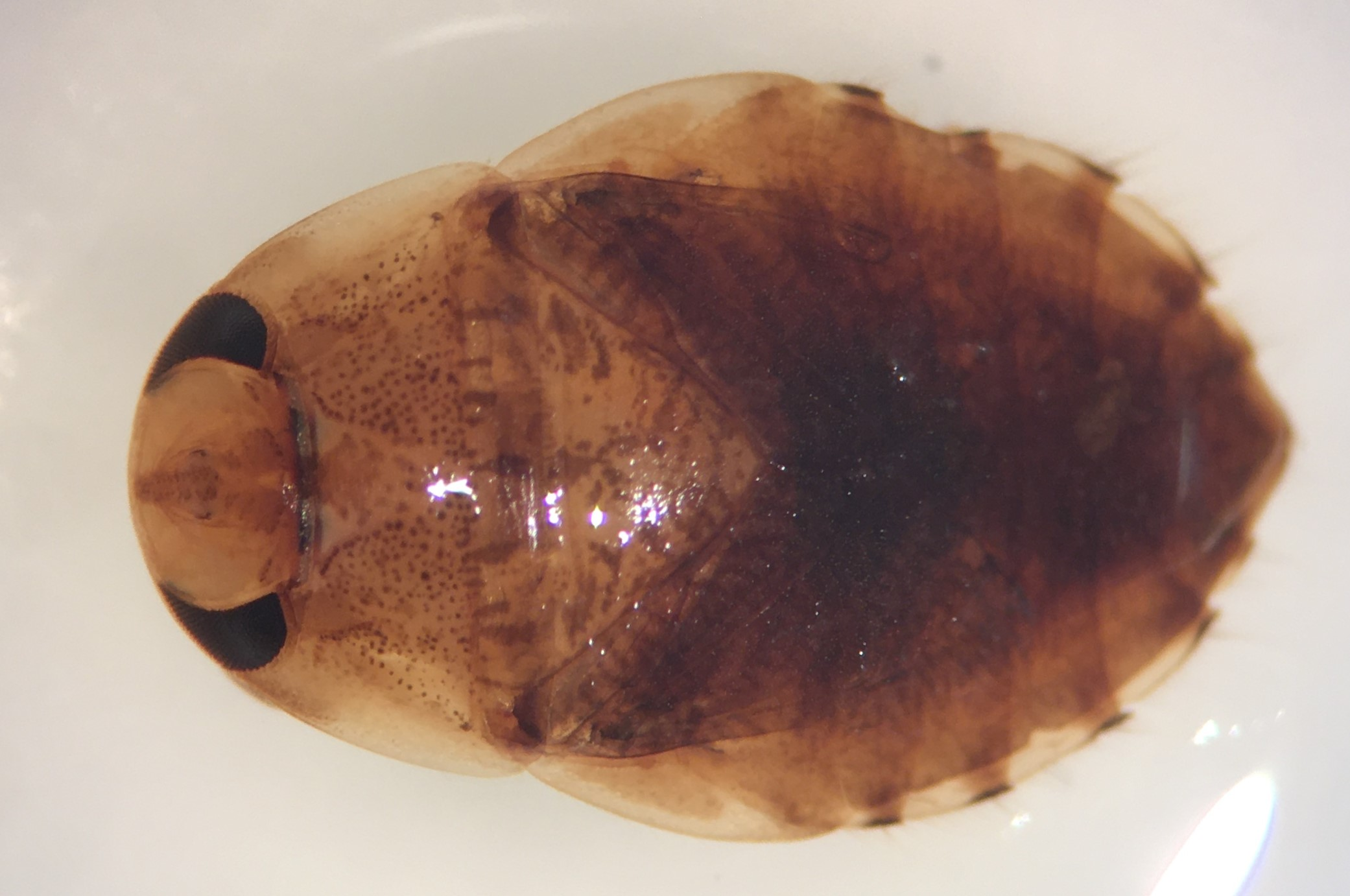

Scientific classification
- Domain: Eukaryota
- Kingdom: Animalia
- Phylum: Arthropoda
- Class: Insecta
- Order: Hemiptera
- Suborder: Heteroptera
- Family: Naucoridae
- Genus: Pelocoris
- Species: P. carolinensis

Binomial name
- Pelocoris carolinensis Torre Bueno, 1907

= Pelocoris carolinensis =

Species of true bug

Pelocoris carolinensis is a species of creeping water bug in the family Naucoridae. It is found in the southeastern United States.
