= Ochterus americanus =

Scientific classification
- Domain: Eukaryota
- Kingdom: Animalia
- Phylum: Arthropoda
- Class: Insecta
- Order: Hemiptera
- Suborder: Heteroptera
- Family: Ochteridae
- Genus: Ochterus
- Species: O. americanus

Binomial name
- Ochterus americanus (Uhler, 1876)

Species of insect

Ochterus americanus is a species of velvety shore bug in the family Ochteridae. It is found in North America.
