= Limnocoris lutzi =

Scientific classification
- Domain: Eukaryota
- Kingdom: Animalia
- Phylum: Arthropoda
- Class: Insecta
- Order: Hemiptera
- Suborder: Heteroptera
- Family: Naucoridae
- Genus: Limnocoris
- Species: L. lutzi

Binomial name
- Limnocoris lutzi La Rivers, 1957

Species of true bug

Limnocoris lutzi is a species of creeping water bug in the family Naucoridae. It is found in Central America and North America.

== Subspecies ==
These two subspecies belong to the species Limnocoris lutzi:

- Limnocoris lutzi lutzi
- Limnocoris lutzi rivers
