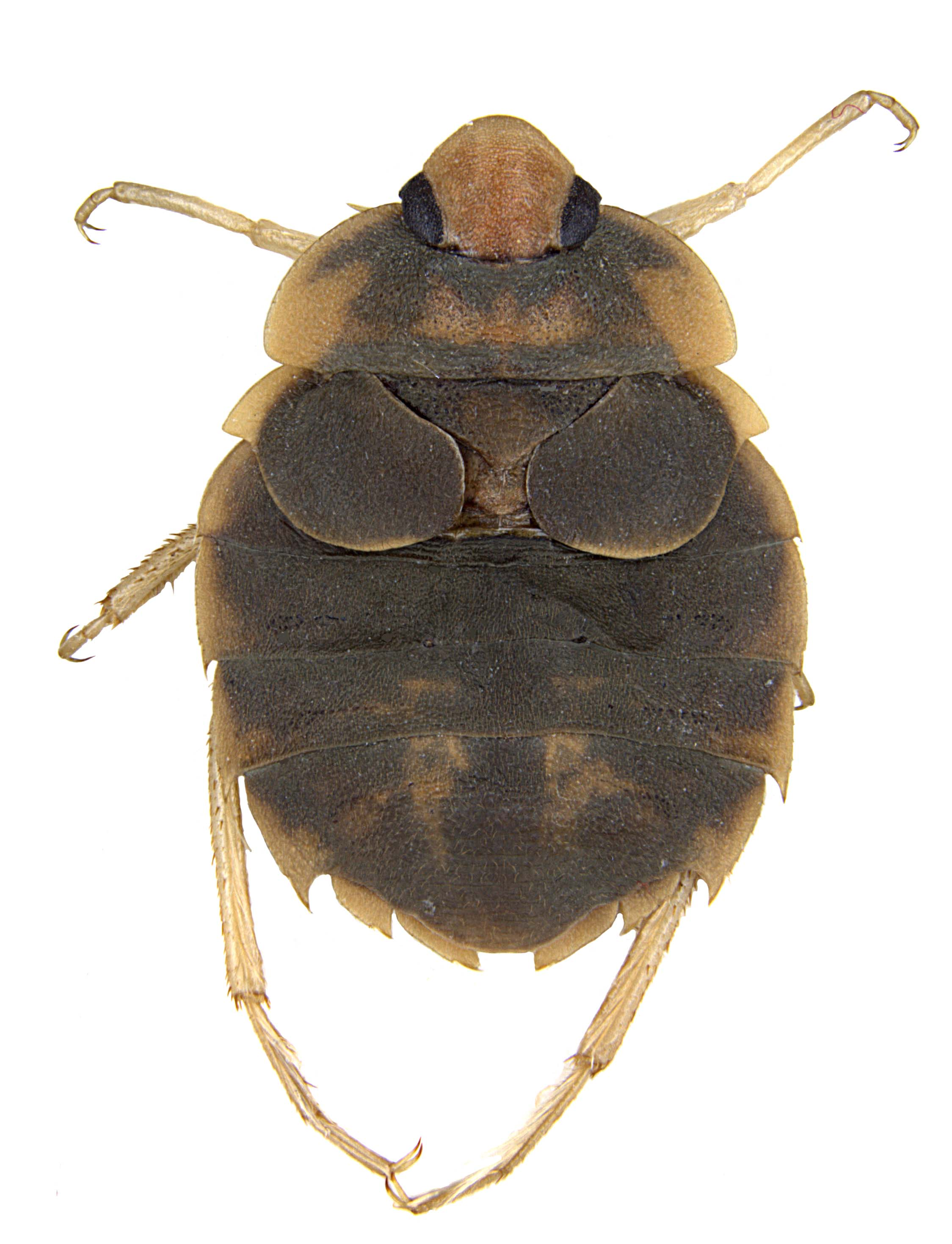

Scientific classification
- Kingdom: Animalia
- Phylum: Arthropoda
- Clade: Pancrustacea
- Class: Insecta
- Order: Hemiptera
- Suborder: Heteroptera
- Family: Aphelocheiridae
- Genus: Aphelocheirus
- Species: A. aestivalis

Binomial name
- Aphelocheirus aestivalis (Fabricius, 1794)

Synonyms
- Naucoris aestivalis Fabricius, 1794

= Aphelocheirus aestivalis =

Species of true bug

Aphelocheirus aestivalis is a Palearctic species of true bug. It is aquatic and wingless, covered in microscopic hairs allowing it to form a physical gill when underwater.

== Taxonomy ==
This species was first described in 1794 by Danish zoologist Johan Christian Fabricius, who studied specimens of it and believed it belongs in a genus known as Naucoris, giving it the scientific name Naucoris aestivalis. Fabricius did not list a specific locality where the specimens were found, only stating that they originate from the region formerly known as Gallia. However, it is most likely that the specimens originate from France. British entomologist John O. Westwood would later study more specimens of this insect collected across England and determine that the species belongs in a separate genus. He therefore established the genus Aphelocheirus in 1833, and renamed this species as Aphelocheirus aestivalis, making it the type species of this genus. The generic name combines the Ancient Greek words apheles (ἀφελής, meaning "simple") and cheir (χείρ, meaning "hand"), in reference to the simple structure of the insect's forelimbs. In 1965, it was reported that the holotype specimen of A. aestivalis studied by Fabricius had gone missing. Therefore, a female specimen collected in France and kept in the Hope Entomological Collections of the Oxford University Museum of Natural History was designated as the lectotype of the species.

Aphelocheirus is the only genus in the family Aphelocheiridae, whose closest known relatives according to phylogenetic analysis are the members of the family Potamocoridae. The genus is very diverse, with almost 60 species known from Afro-Eurasia alone, including A. aestivalis. Although A. aestivalis was historically thought to be the only species in the genus to occur in Europe, two additional species named A. murcius and A. occidentalis were reported from the Iberian Peninsula in 1989. The former of the two Iberian species is so similar to A. aestivalis that some experts have doubted whether they are truly distinct from each other. However, a study published in 2011 finds the two to be closely related but separate species based on molecular analysis and differences in male genital shape, and that a third, unnamed species (originally thought to be a population of A. murcius) is also present on the Peninsula. The cladogram below shows the results of the molecular analysis in this study:

- - Aphelocheirus occidentalis
  - - Aphelocheirus sp. (previously A. murcius)
    - - Aphelocheirus aestivalis
      - Aphelocheirus murcius

== Description ==
Measuring 8.5–10 mm (0.33–0.39 in) in body length, Aphelocheirus aestivalis is medium-sized for an aquatic bug. Females tend to grow slightly larger than males. The body of this insect is flattened, and in the vast majority of individuals is rounded, with small, reduced wings. This form is known as the micropterous morph and is incapable of flight. However, the rarer macropterous morph has a more elongated, ellipsoid body, and is capable of flight due to its large wings. This species is mostly brown or greyish brown, though the head, legs and the edges of the body are yellow, and the eyes are a blackish colour. Entirely black individuals have also been recorded, but this colour is caused by a coating on top of the exoskeleton rather than pigments within it, and is most often seen in older insects. In some individuals, there are dark patches of colour on the head, or yellow markings or bands on the thorax and abdomen.

The head of this animal is slightly longer than it is wide, and bears flattened, narrow eyes. The part of the head made up of the frons and the clypeus (two of the hardened parts of the face) has a rounded cone-like shape pointing towards the front of the insect. Both the scutellum and pronotum (two parts of the thorax) are short and wide, with the latter bearing rounded lobes on the sides of its hind part. The abdomen has a serrated outline, with the serrations being formed by tergites projecting from the sides of each abdominal segment. The sternites on the underside of the abdomen each bear a slight protrusion, together forming a small keel running down the middle of the abdomen's underside.

== Distribution and habitat ==
This species is widespread, ranging across much of Europe and into northeastern Africa and southwestern Asia. It is found from the British Isles in the west across to the Caucasus and Ural mountains in the east. In Africa, A. aestivalis is known from Egypt, and its range in Asia includes Turkey and Georgia. In Europe, its range stretches from as northerly as southern Scandinavia to as far south as the northern areas of the Mediterranean basin. Although older sources may claim that it can be found in the Iberian Peninsula, these records likely actually represent the similar-looking Aphelocheirus occidentalis, and a 2011 study has confirmed that A. aestivalis does not occur in this region. While the flightless micropterous morph is found throughout the range of the species, the flighted macropterous morph has only been found parts of central and southern Europe.

Within its range, this insect mainly lives in stony rivers with fast-flowing, oxygen-rich water or in stagnant water sources such as reservoirs and lakes. It is a benthic species, living near the bottoms of water bodies with depths of 0.4–9.0 m (1 ft 4 in – 29 ft 6 in), where it occurs beneath plants, rocks or sediment. Though primarily a freshwater animal, it can also inhabit brackish water, as indicated by reports of specimens from the estuary of the River Seine in 1898, and from the brackish parts of the Gulf of Finland and Randers Fjord in 1943.

== Biology ==
=== Polymorphism ===
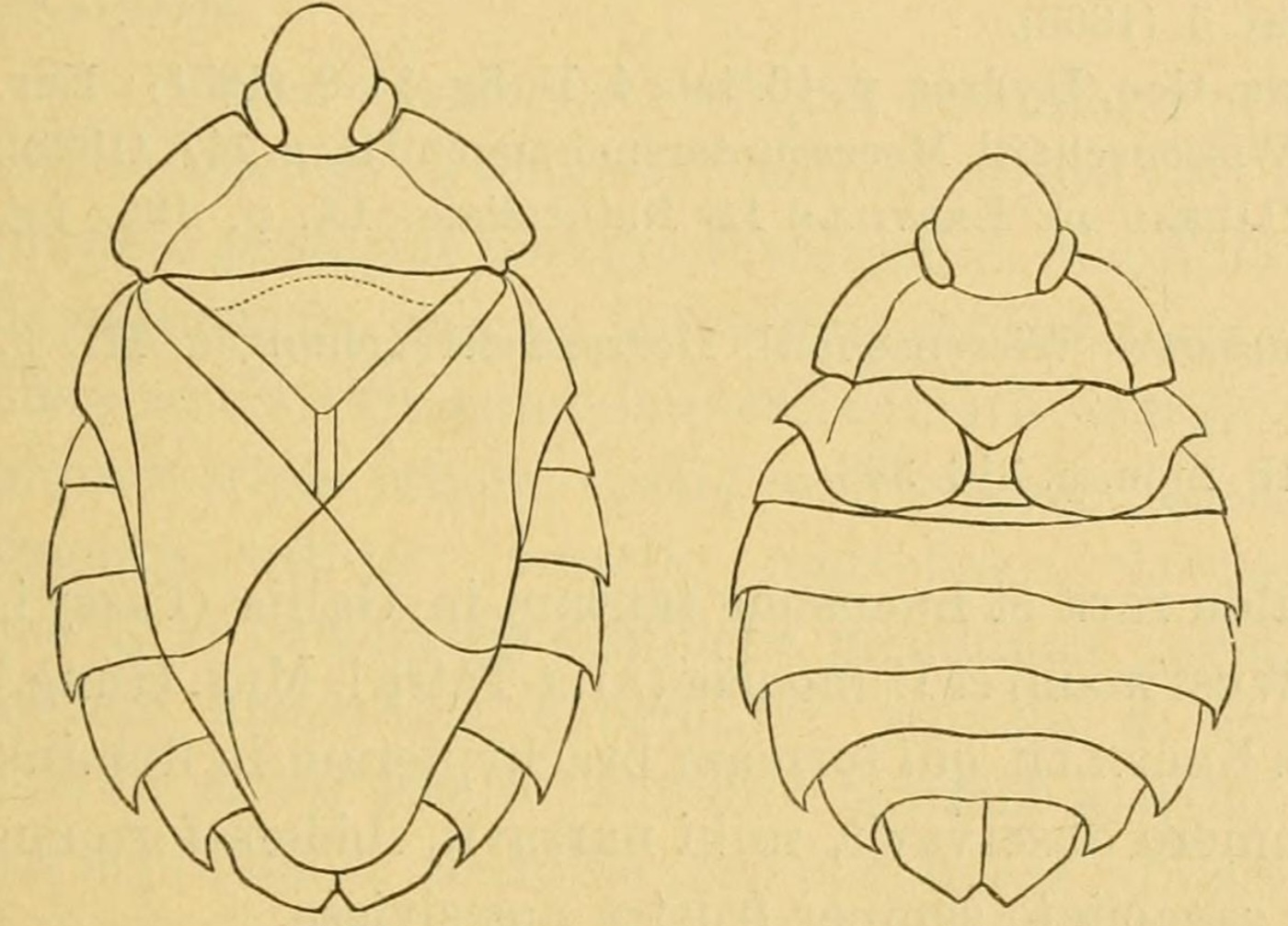
Illustration depicting the macropterous (left) and micropterous (right) morphs

Aphelocheirus aestivalis is a polymorphic species, with the majority of individuals representing a flightless form with reduced wings known as the micropterous morph, and a large-winged form capable of flight referred to as the macropterous morph is also known to exist. The latter is far rarer than the former and does not occur in all regions where the species is found. French zoologist Henri Gadeau de Kerville reportedly never found the macropterous morph when surveying the River Seine, despite observing the micropterous morph in great abundance at the same site. It was formerly theorized that the development of macropterous individuals is triggered by low oxygen levels in the water. However, this theory has been rejected in favour of the idea that wing development is genetically controlled.

=== Respiration ===
Like other insects, this species is reliant on an internal tracheal tube system connecting to the outside of the body via spiracles for gas exchange. In order to breathe underwater, this species is covered in millions of hydrophobic (water-repellent) microscopic hairs which hold a layer of air permanently over the surface of its body which the spiracles can receive. Up to 2.5 million such hairs may be present on just 1 mm^{2} (0.0016 sq in) of the body surface. The air does not have to be replenished at the surface, allowing the insect to spend its entire life submerged in water if the oxygen content is sufficient. This structure, referred to as a plastron, serves both as a method of storing oxygen and as a "physical gill" capable of gas exchange with the adjacent layer of water, known as the boundary layer.

When the effective thickness of the boundary layer decreases, the rate of gas exchange increases. Thinning of this layer can be caused by increased convection, which is achieved by either by movement of the insect through the water or inhabiting flowing water. The species therefore primarily inhabits moving water such as that of streams, but even in stagnant water, it is typically capable of maintaining a boundary layer thin enough to meet its respiratory requirements. In stagnant water with extremely low oxygen levels, the insect may swim more to thin the boundary layer, or towards plants or the water surface where oxygen content is higher. Furthermore, higher temperatures lead to a lower partial pressure of oxygen in the plastron. The thermal tolerance of this insect is therefore greatly limited by oxygen, being more intolerant of heat in low-oxygen water than in water with high oxygen levels. A 2018 study estimated that the metabolic scope of the insect decreases in oxygen-rich flowing water at temperatures between 20 and 25 degrees Celsius, and that the animal would not survive above this temperature if the partial pressure of oxygen in the water was at 5 kPa.

=== Feeding ===
A carnivorous bottom-dwelling insect, this species preys on other small animals which it searches for by probing the bottoms of water bodies using its rostrum (mouthparts) or crawling under rocks. Once prey is found, the insect uses its front limbs to capture it, then uses its rostrum to pierce the body of the prey and suck the fluids for approximately 20 minutes. Other invertebrates and small fish are among the reported prey species for this insect, but different authors have reported contrasting details on its dietary biology. Danish zoologist Carl Wesenberg-Lund wrote in a book published in 1943 that A. aestivalis feeds on freshwater mussels by sinking its rostrum between their shells. A 1988 study on individuals from the Glatt river in Switzerland cast doubt on this, noting how mussels were too rare at this site to be a main prey item. Furthermore, this study conducted feeding experiments in aquariums on insects captured at this site, in which the insects fed on chironomid larvae, oligochaete worms, the small crustacean Gammarus, net-building larvae of the caddisflies Hydropsyche and Neureclipsis, and nymphs of the mayfly Baetis. However, they never preyed on hard-shelled animals like mussels, snails or case-building caddisfly larvae, even after crawling directly on top of them. A 1995 study conducted similar feeding experiments in the Biber River in Germany and concluded that mayfly nymphs of the genera Baetis and Ephemerella are the main prey of A. aestivalis at this site, whereas Gammarus, Hydropsyche and the mayfly Ecdyonurus are rarely fed on.
