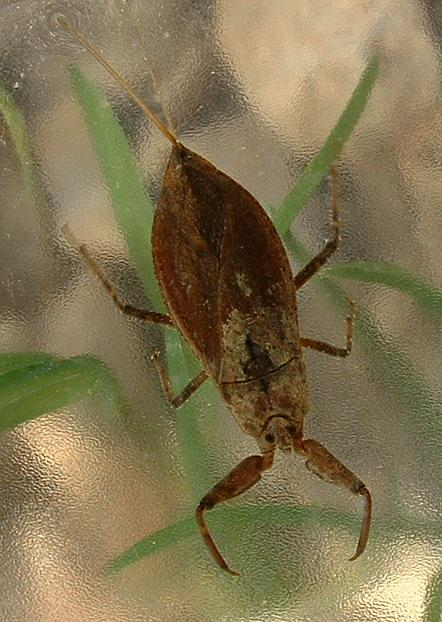
- Nepa cinerea, a water scorpion

Scientific classification
- Kingdom: Animalia
- Phylum: Arthropoda
- Clade: Pancrustacea
- Class: Insecta
- Order: Hemiptera
- Suborder: Heteroptera
- Infraorder: Nepomorpha; Popov (1968)

Superfamilies
- Aphelocheiroidea; Corixoidea; Naucoroidea; Nepoidea; Notonectoidea; Ochteroidea; Pleoidea

Synonyms
- Cryptocerata; Hydrocorisae

= Nepomorpha =

Nepomorpha Temporal range: Anisian–Present

Infraorder of true bugs

Nepomorpha is an infraorder of insects in the "true bug" order (Hemiptera). They belong to the "typical" bugs of the suborder Heteroptera. Due to their aquatic habits, these animals are known as true water bugs. They occur all over the world outside the polar regions, with about 2,000 species altogether. The Nepomorpha can be distinguished from related Heteroptera by their missing or vestigial ocelli. Also, as referred to by the obsolete name Cryptocerata ("the hidden-horned ones"), their antennae are reduced, with weak muscles, and usually carried tucked against the head.

Most of the species within this infraorder live in freshwater habitats. The exceptions are members of the superfamily Ochteroidea, which are found along the water's edge. Many of these insects are predators of invertebrates and in some cases – like the large water scorpions (Nepidae) and giant water bugs (Belostomatidae) – even small fish and amphibians. Others are omnivores or feed on plants. Their mouthparts form a rostrum as in all Heteroptera and most Hemiptera. With this, they pierce their food source to suck out fluids; some, like the Corixidae, are also able to chew their food to some extent, sucking up the resulting pulp. The rostrum can also be used to sting in defence; some, like the common backswimmer (Notonecta glauca) of the Notonectidae can easily pierce the skin of humans and deliver a wound often more painful than a bee's sting.

== Systematics ==
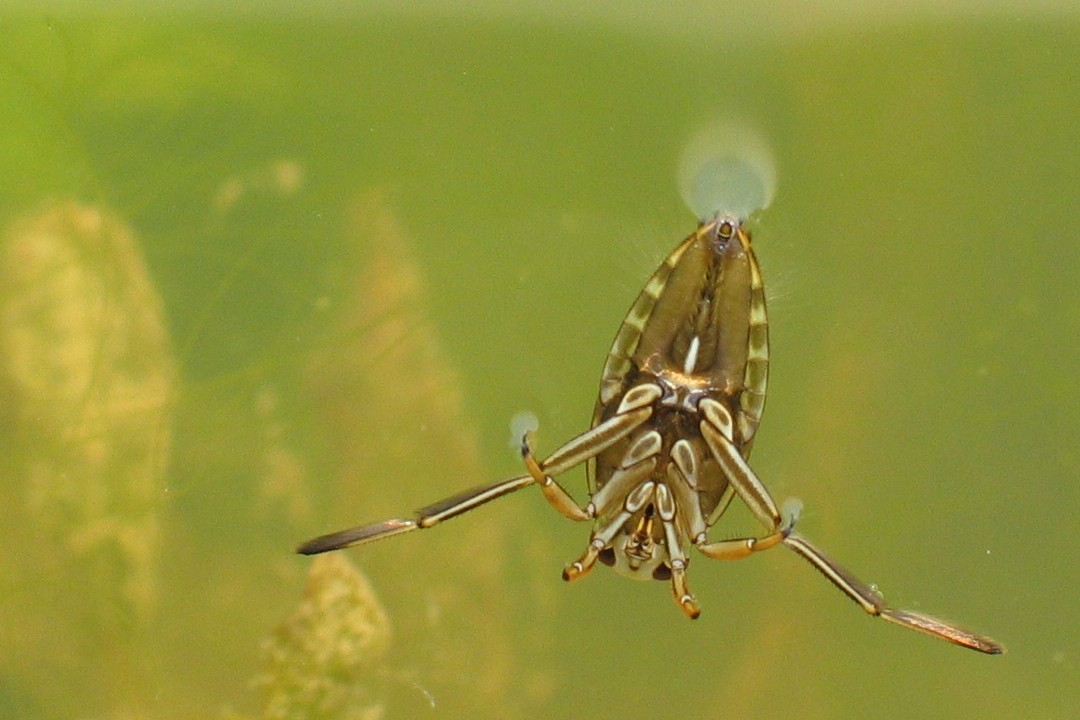
Notonecta glauca (Notonectidae)

The Nepomorpha probably originated around the start of the Early Triassic, some 250 million years ago. As evidenced by fossils such as the rather advanced Triassocoridae or the primitive water boatman Lufengnacta, the radiation establishing today's superfamilies seems to have been largely complete by the end of the Triassic 201 million years ago. There are a large number of fossil genera, but except those placed in Triassocoridae they can at least tentatively be assigned to the extant superfamilies.

Though the systematics and phylogeny of the higher taxa of Nepomorpha were long controversial, cladistic analysis of mitochondrial 16S and nuclear 28S rDNA sequence data and morphology has more recently resolved to near-perfection. The long-accepted superfamilies are all monophyletic, with the exception of the Naucoroidea, which is now monotypic with the Aphelocheiridae and Potamocoridae being split off in a new superfamily Aphelocheiroidea. The Cibariopectinata, a proposed clade established on the presence of cibariopectine structures in the food-sucking pump of some of the most advanced true water bugs (Tripartita), might indeed be monophyletic. Alternatively it might be synonymous with the Tripartita, the Ochteroidea having lost the cibariopectines again due to the different requirements of their (for Nepomorpha) unusual lifestyle.

About seven superfamilies, in evolutionary sequence, from the most ancient to the most modern lineage, have been identified in the Infraorder Nepomorpha:

- †Morrisonnepa (incertae sedis: Morrison Formation, Tithonian ~ 151 Ma.)

=== Nepoidea ===
- Family Belostomatidae – giant water bugs
- Family Nepidae – water scorpions

=== Corixoidea ===
- Family Corixidae – water boatmen
- Family Micronectidae – pygmy water boatmen

=== Ochteroidea ===
Clade Tripartita

- Family Gelastocoridae – toad bugs
- Family Ochteridae – velvety shore bugs

Clade Cibariopectinata (disputed)

- Family Triassocoridae (fossil, tentatively placed here)

=== Aphelocheiroidea ===
- Family Aphelocheiridae
- Family Potamocoridae

=== Naucoroidea ===
- Family Naucoridae – creeping water bugs

=== Notonectoidea ===
- Family Notonectidae – backswimmers

=== Pleoidea ===
Note: sometimes included in Notonectoidea

- Family Helotrephidae
- Family Pleidae – pygmy backswimmers
