= Ambrysus circumcinctus =

Scientific classification
- Domain: Eukaryota
- Kingdom: Animalia
- Phylum: Arthropoda
- Class: Insecta
- Order: Hemiptera
- Suborder: Heteroptera
- Family: Naucoridae
- Genus: Ambrysus
- Species: A. circumcinctus

Binomial name
- Ambrysus circumcinctus Montandon, 1910

Synonyms
- Ambrysus caliginosus Usinger, 1946; Ambrysus circumcinctus caliginosus Usinger, 1946; Ambrysus circumcinctus concavus La Rivers, 1967; Ambrysus circumcinctus extremus La Rivers, 1967

Species of true bug

Ambrysus circumcinctus is a species of creeping water bug in the family Naucoridae. It is found in Central America and North America.
