= Ambrysus mormon =

Scientific classification
- Domain: Eukaryota
- Kingdom: Animalia
- Phylum: Arthropoda
- Class: Insecta
- Order: Hemiptera
- Suborder: Heteroptera
- Family: Naucoridae
- Genus: Ambrysus
- Species: A. mormon

Binomial name
- Ambrysus mormon Montandon, 1909

Synonyms
- Ambrysus mormon australis La Rivers, 1953; Ambrysus mormon heidemanni Montandon, 1910; Ambrysus mormon minor La Rivers, 1963

Species of true bug

Ambrysus mormon, the creeping water bug, is a species of creeping water bug in the family Naucoridae. It is found in the western United States and northwestern Mexico.

== Subspecies ==
There were formerly three subspecies of Ambrysus mormon but they were synonymized by Reynoso-Velasco and Sites:

- Ambrysus mormon heidemanni Montandon, 1910
- Ambrysus mormon minor La Rivers, 1963
- Ambrysus mormon mormon Montandon, 1909
