= Ambrysus lunatus =

Scientific classification
- Kingdom: Animalia
- Phylum: Arthropoda
- Class: Insecta
- Order: Hemiptera
- Suborder: Heteroptera
- Family: Naucoridae
- Genus: Ambrysus
- Species: A. lunatus

Binomial name
- Ambrysus lunatus Usinger, 1946

Species of true bug

Ambrysus lunatus is a species of creeping water bug in the family Naucoridae. It is found in Central America and North America.
