= Ambrysus puncticollis =

Scientific classification
- Kingdom: Animalia
- Phylum: Arthropoda
- Clade: Pancrustacea
- Class: Insecta
- Order: Hemiptera
- Suborder: Heteroptera
- Family: Naucoridae
- Genus: Ambrysus
- Species: A. puncticollis

Binomial name
- Ambrysus puncticollis Stål, 1876

Species of true bug

Ambrysus puncticollis is a species of creeping water bug in the family Naucoridae. It is found in Central America and North America.
