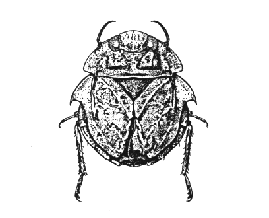

Scientific classification
- Domain: Eukaryota
- Kingdom: Animalia
- Phylum: Arthropoda
- Class: Insecta
- Order: Hemiptera
- Suborder: Heteroptera
- Family: Naucoridae
- Genus: Limnocoris
- Species: L. moapensis

Binomial name
- Limnocoris moapensis (La Rivers, 1950)

Synonyms
- Usingerina moapensis La Rivers, 1950

= Limnocoris moapensis =

Species of true bug

Limnocoris moapensis, the moapa warm springs naucorid, is a species of creeping water bug in the family Naucoridae.
