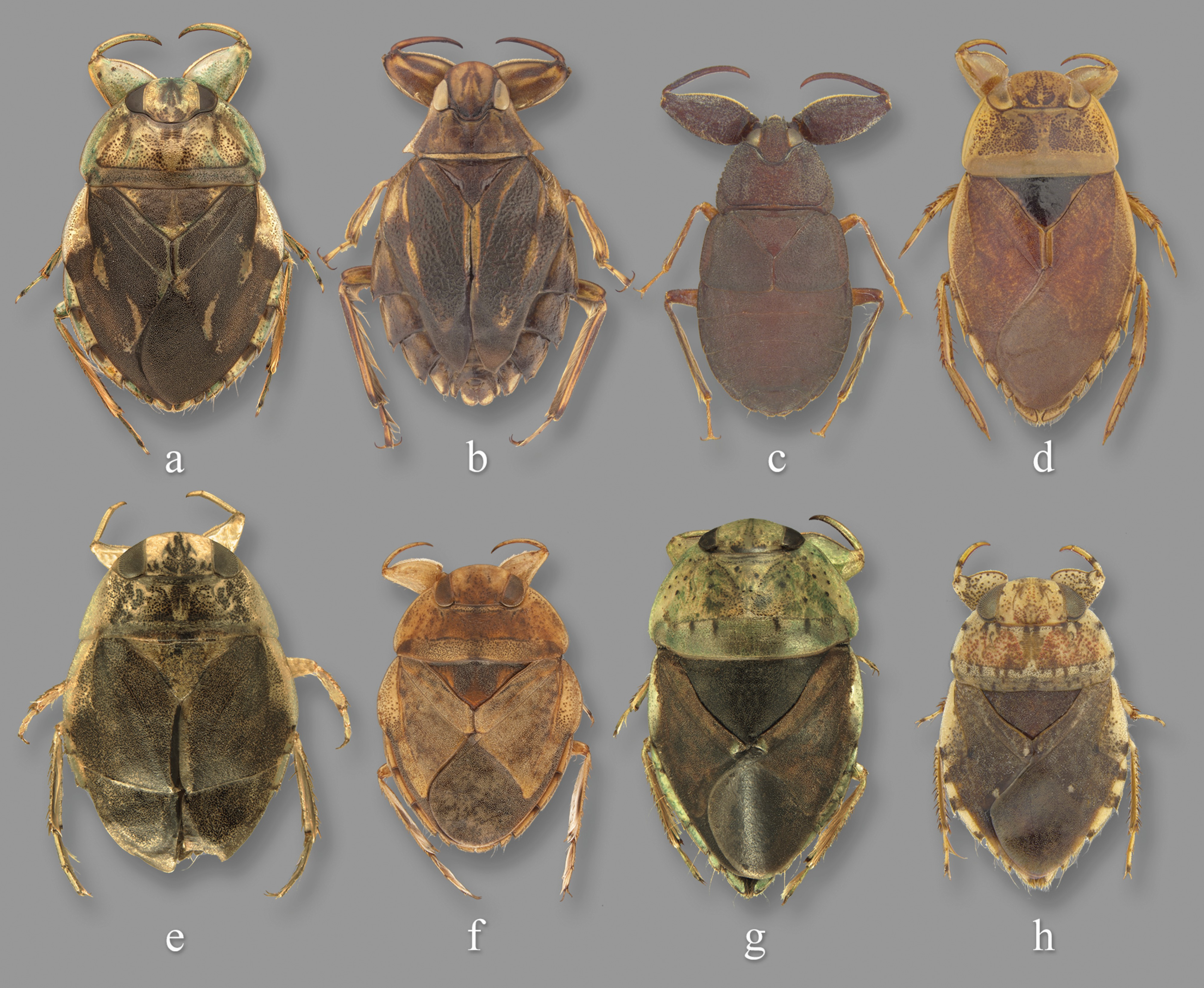
- (b), Cryphocricinae: Cryphocricos hungerfordi

Scientific classification
- Kingdom: Animalia
- Phylum: Arthropoda
- Clade: Pancrustacea
- Class: Insecta
- Order: Hemiptera
- Suborder: Heteroptera
- Family: Naucoridae
- Genus: Cryphocricos
- Species: C. hungerfordi

Binomial name
- Cryphocricos hungerfordi Usinger, 1947

= Cryphocricos hungerfordi =

Species of true bug

Cryphocricos hungerfordi is a species of creeping water bug in the family Naucoridae. It is found in Central America and North America.
