= Potamocoridae =

Scientific classification
- Kingdom: Animalia
- Phylum: Arthropoda
- Class: Insecta
- Order: Hemiptera
- Suborder: Heteroptera
- Infraorder: Nepomorpha
- Family: Potamocoridae; Usinger, 1941

Genera
- Coleopterocoris; Potamocoris

Family of true bugs

Potamocoridae is a family of true water bugs. The family was first scientifically described by Robert L. Usinger in 1941.

== Morphology ==
Most species of this family are brown or light brown and long-winged. They have smooth wings reminiscent of water beetles. Often the pronotum and scutellum are darker colored. Some species have long golden hairs along their bodies. The bugs are found in slow-flowing water. The biology of this family is still poorly studied.

== Distribution ==
Species of this family are found in tropical America, especially in South America, and a few in Central America.

== Taxonomy ==
Potamocoridae is included in the superfamily Naucoroidea, or placed with Aphelocheiridae in a superfamily called Aphelocheiroidea.

The family contains the following genera:

- Coleopterocoris Hungerford, 1942
- Potamocoris Hungerford, 1941
