= Ochterus banksi =

Scientific classification
- Kingdom: Animalia
- Phylum: Arthropoda
- Class: Insecta
- Order: Hemiptera
- Suborder: Heteroptera
- Family: Ochteridae
- Genus: Ochterus
- Species: O. banksi

Binomial name
- Ochterus banksi Barber, 1913

Synonyms
- Ochterus flaviclavus Barber, 1913

Species of true bug

Ochterus banksi is a species of velvety shore bug in the family Ochteridae. It is found in North America.
