= Ambrysus occidentalis =

Scientific classification
- Domain: Eukaryota
- Kingdom: Animalia
- Phylum: Arthropoda
- Class: Insecta
- Order: Hemiptera
- Suborder: Heteroptera
- Family: Naucoridae
- Genus: Ambrysus
- Species: A. occidentalis

Binomial name
- Ambrysus occidentalis La Rivers, 1951

Species of true bug

Ambrysus occidentalis is a species of creeping water bug in the family Naucoridae. It is found in Central America and North America.
