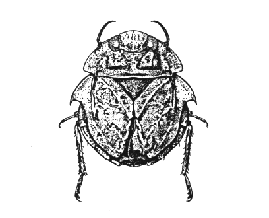
- Limnocoris moapensis

Scientific classification
- Kingdom: Animalia
- Phylum: Arthropoda
- Clade: Pancrustacea
- Class: Insecta
- Order: Hemiptera
- Suborder: Heteroptera
- Family: Naucoridae
- Genus: Limnocoris; Stål, 1860

Synonyms
- Borborocoris Stål, 1861; Sattleriella De Carlo, 1966; Usingerina Stål, 1860

= Limnocoris =

Genus of true bugs

Limnocoris is a genus of creeping water bugs in the family Naucoridae. There are more than 70 described species in Limnocoris.

== Species ==
These species belong to the genus Limnocoris:

- Limnocoris abbreviatus La Rivers, 1974
- Limnocoris abrasum Nieser, González & Eichelkraut, 1993
- Limnocoris aculabrum La Rivers, 1973
- Limnocoris acutalis La Rivers, 1974
- Limnocoris amazonensis Rodrigues & Sites, 2023
- Limnocoris angulatus Nieser, González & Eichelkraut, 1993
- Limnocoris asper Nieser & López Ruf, 2001
- Limnocoris borellii Montandon, 1897
- Limnocoris bouvieri Montandon, 1898
- Limnocoris brasiliensis De Carlo, 1941
- Limnocoris brauni De Carlo, 1966
- Limnocoris burmeisteri De Carlo, 1967
- Limnocoris caraceae Nieser & López Ruf, 2001
- Limnocoris chaetocarinatus Rodrigues & Sites, 2019
- Limnocoris chrysosetosus Rodrigues & Sites, 2021
- Limnocoris decarloi Nieser & López Ruf, 2001
- Limnocoris distanti Montandon, 1911
- Limnocoris dubiosus Montandon, 1898
- Limnocoris elongatus Rodrigues & Sites, 2021
- Limnocoris emboliatus Rodrigues & Sites, 2021
- Limnocoris espinolai Nieser & López Ruf, 2001
- Limnocoris exogkoma Manzano et al., 1995
- Limnocoris fittkaui De Carlo, 1967
- Limnocoris flavescens Rodrigues & Sites, 2023
- Limnocoris gracilis Nieser, González & Eichelkraut, 1993
- Limnocoris hintoni La Rivers, 1970
- Limnocoris illiesi De Carlo, 1967
- Limnocoris inflatus Rodrigues & Sites, 2023
- Limnocoris inornatus Montandon, 1898
- Limnocoris insignis Stål, 1860
- Limnocoris insularis Champion, 1901
- Limnocoris intermedius Nieser & López Ruf, 2001
- Limnocoris lanemeloi Nieser & López Ruf, 2001
- Limnocoris longirostris Rodrigues & Sites, 2021
- Limnocoris luisae Rodrigues & Sites, 2021
- Limnocoris lutzi La Rivers, 1957
- Limnocoris machrisi Nieser & López Ruf, 2001
- Limnocoris maculatus De Carlo, 1951
- Limnocoris maculiceps Montandon, 1898 (missed by ITIS, see Moreira et al. 2011)
- Limnocoris major Rodrigues & Sites, 2019
- Limnocoris malkini La Rivers, 1974
- Limnocoris melloleitaoi De Carlo, 1951
- Limnocoris menkei La Rivers, 1962
- Limnocoris minutus De Carlo, 1951
- Limnocoris moapensis (La Rivers, 1950) (moapa warm springs naucorid)
- Limnocoris molanoi Rodrigues & Sites, 2021
- Limnocoris moreirai Rodrigues & Sites, 2023
- Limnocoris nannus Rodrigues & Sites, 2019
- Limnocoris nieseri Rodrigues & Sites, 2021
- Limnocoris nigropunctatus Montandon, 1909
- Limnocoris obscurus Montandon, 1898
- Limnocoris ochraceus Montandon, 1898
- Limnocoris ovatulus Montandon, 1897
- Limnocoris pallescens (Stål, 1861)
- Limnocoris panamensis La Rivers, 1970
- Limnocoris pauper Montandon, 1897
- Limnocoris pectoralis Montandon, 1897
- Limnocoris peruvianus Melin, 1930 (Stat. Restit. in Rodrigues & Sites, 2021)
- Limnocoris porphyros Nieser & López Ruf, 2001
- Limnocoris profundus (Say, 1832)
- Limnocoris pulchellus La Rivers, 1974
- Limnocoris pusillus Montandon, 1897
- Limnocoris pygmaeus La Rivers, 1956
- Limnocoris reynosoi Rodrigues & Sites, 2021
- Limnocoris rodriguesi Reynoso-Velasco, 2020
- Limnocoris rotundatus De Carlo, 1951
- Limnocoris saphis Nieser & López Ruf, 2001
- Limnocoris signoreti Montandon, 1897
- Limnocoris siolii (De Carlo, 1966)
- Limnocoris stali Montandon, 1897 (Stat. Restit. in Rodrigues & Sites, 2021)
- Limnocoris submontandoni La Rivers, 1974
- Limnocoris subpauper Nieser & López Ruf, 2001
- Limnocoris surinamensis Nieser, 1975 (see Rodrigues & Sites, 2023).
- Limnocoris virescens Montandon, 1897
- Limnocoris volxemi (Lethierry, 1877)
- Limnocoris woytkowskii La Rivers, 1970
- Limnocoris yanomami Rodrigues & Sites, 2023
- Limnocoris zacki Rodrigues & Sites, 2019

Synonyms

- Limnocoris alcorni La Rivers, 1976 as junior synonym of Limnocoris insularis Champion, 1901 in Rodrigues & Sites, 2019
- Limnocoris solenoides La Rivers, 1970 as junior synonym of Limnocoris pygmaeus La Rivers, 1956 in Rodrigues & Sites, 2019
- Limnocoris laucki La Rivers, 1970, Limnocoris brailovskyi La Rivers, 1976, Limnocoris stangei La Rivers, 1976 as junior synonyms of Limnocoris signoreti Montandon, 1897 in Rodrigues & Sites, 2019
- Limnocoris horvathi Montandon, 1900 as junior synonym of Limnocoris borellii Montandon, 1897 in Rodrigues & Sites, 2021
- Limnocoris aymarana Poisson, 1954 as junior synonym of Limnocoris dubiosus Montandon, 1898 in Rodrigues & Sites, 2021
- Limnocoris trilobatus Nieser, González & Eichelkraut, 1993 as junior synonym of Limnocoris malkini La Rivers, 1974 in Rodrigues & Sites, 2021
- Limnocoris maculatus De Carlo, 1951 as junior synonym of Limnocoris ochraceus Montandon, 1898 in Rodrigues & Sites, 2021
- Limnocoris bergrothi Montandon, 1898 as junior synonym of Limnocoris pallescens (Stål, 1861) in Rodrigues & Sites, 2021
- Limnocoris rivalis Melin, 1930 as junior synonym of Limnocoris pectoralis Montandon, 1897 in Rodrigues & Sites, 2021
- Limnocoris calii Nieser, González & Eichelkraut, 1993 as junior synonym of Limnocoris peruvianus Melin, 1930 [Stat. Restit.] in Rodrigues & Sites, 2021
- Limnocoris carcharus La Rivers, 1976 and Limnocoris robustus Roback & Nieser, 1974 as junior synonyms of Limnocoris stali Montandon, 1897 [Stat. Restit.] in Rodrigues & Sites, 2021
- Limnocoris lautereri Nieser, Chen & Melo, 2013 as junior synonym of Limnocoris burmeisteri De Carlo, 1967 in Rodrigues & Sites, 2023
- Limnocoris birabeni De Carlo, 1967 and Limnocoris bruchi De Carlo, 1967 as junior synonyms of Limnocoris menkei La Rivers, 1962 in Rodrigues & Sites, 2023
