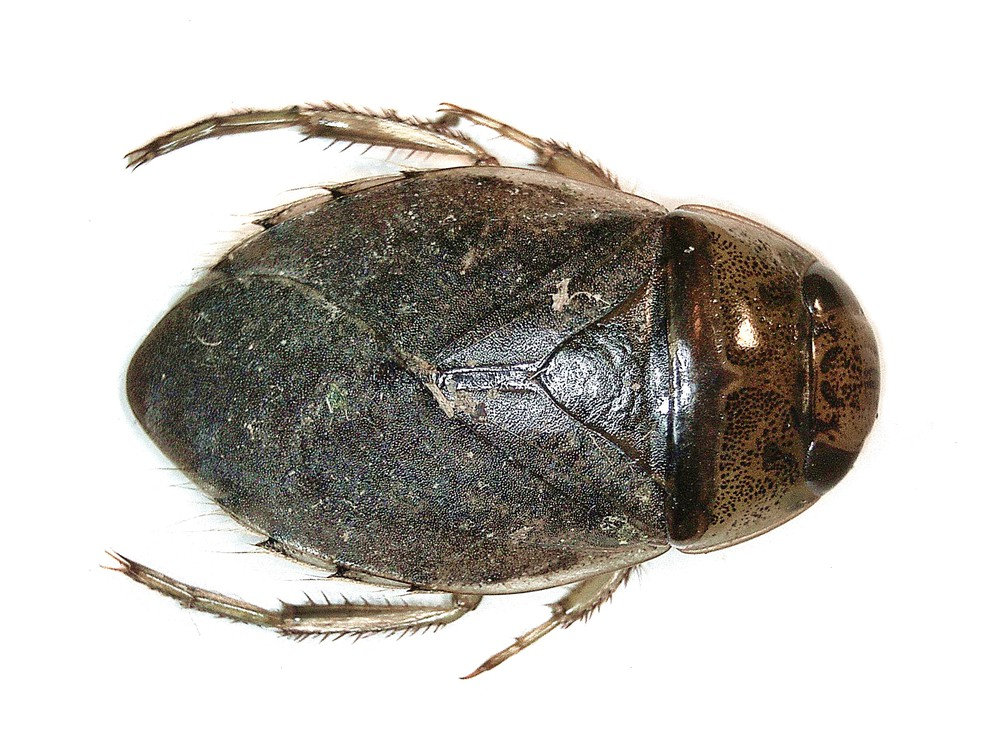
- Ilyocoris cimicoides

Scientific classification
- Kingdom: Animalia
- Phylum: Arthropoda
- Clade: Pancrustacea
- Class: Insecta
- Order: Hemiptera
- Suborder: Heteroptera
- Family: Naucoridae
- Genus: Ilyocoris; Stål, 1861

= Ilyocoris =

Genus of true bugs

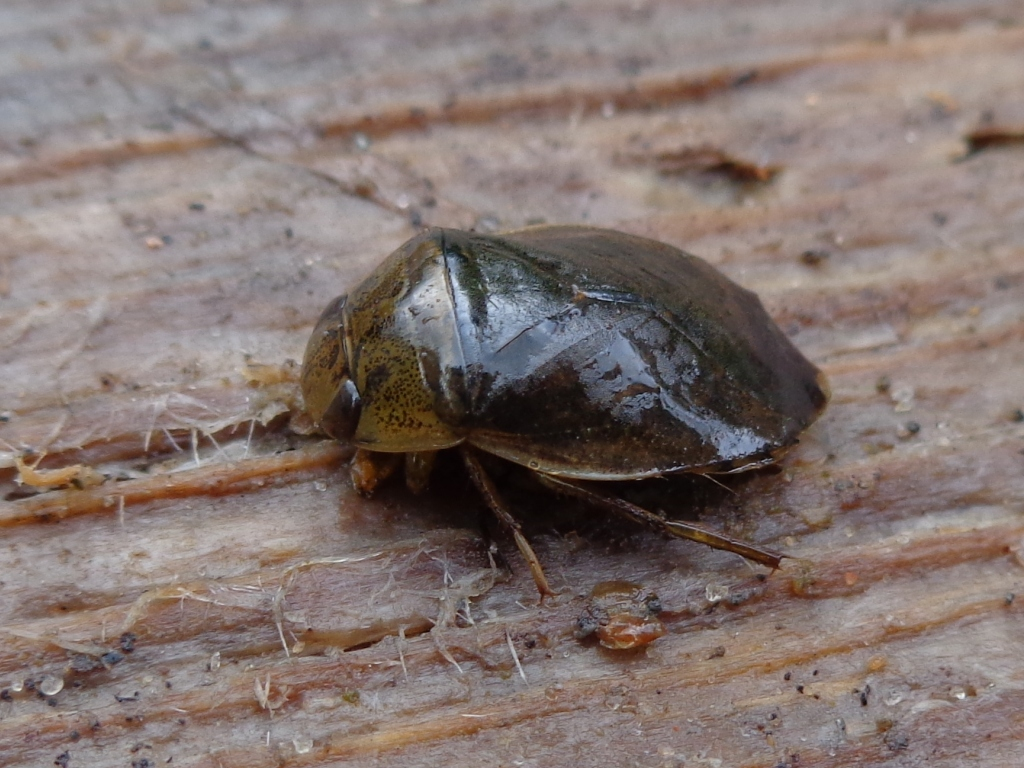

Ilyocoris is a genus of true bugs belonging to the family Naucoridae.

Species:

- Ilyocoris cimicoides (Linnaeus, 1758)
- Ilyocoris rottensis Schlechtendal, 1899
