= Cryphocricos =

Scientific classification
- Domain: Eukaryota
- Kingdom: Animalia
- Phylum: Arthropoda
- Class: Insecta
- Order: Hemiptera
- Suborder: Heteroptera
- Family: Naucoridae
- Genus: Cryphocricos; Signoret, 1850

Genus of true bugs

Cryphocricos is a genus of creeping water bugs in the family Naucoridae. There are about 15 described species in Cryphocricos.

== Species ==
These 15 species belong to the genus Cryphocricos:

- Cryphocricos barozzi Signoret, 1850
- Cryphocricos barozzii Signoret, 1850
- Cryphocricos breddini Montandon, 1911
- Cryphocricos daguerrei De Carlo, 1940
- Cryphocricos fittkaui De Carlo, 1967
- Cryphocricos granulosus De Carlo, 1967
- Cryphocricos hungerfordi Usinger, 1947
- Cryphocricos latus Usinger, 1947
- Cryphocricos mexicanus Usinger, 1947
- Cryphocricos montei De Carlo, 1951
- Cryphocricos obscuratus Usinger, 1947
- Cryphocricos peruvianus De Carlo, 1940
- Cryphocricos rufus De Carlo, 1940
- Cryphocricos schubarti De Carlo, 1968
- Cryphocricos vianai De Carlo, 1951
