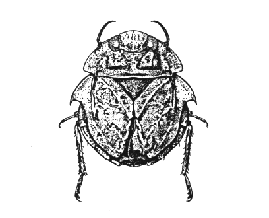

Scientific classification
- Kingdom: Animalia
- Phylum: Arthropoda
- Clade: Pancrustacea
- Class: Insecta
- Order: Hemiptera
- Suborder: Heteroptera
- Family: Naucoridae
- Genus: Ambrysus; Stål, 1861

= Ambrysus =

Genus of true bugs

Ambrysus is a genus of creeping water bugs in the family Naucoridae. There are more than 90 described species in Ambrysus.

== Species ==
These 96 species belong to the genus Ambrysus:

- Ambrysus abortus La Rivers, 1953
- Ambrysus acutangulus Montandon, 1897
- Ambrysus amargosus La Rivers, 1953
- Ambrysus arizonus La Rivers, 1951
- Ambrysus attenuatus Montandon, 1897
- Ambrysus ayoyolin Reynoso & Sites, 2016-22
- Ambrysus baeus J.Polhemus & D.Polhemus, 1981-01
- Ambrysus bergi Montandon, 1897
- Ambrysus bifidus La Rivers & Nieser, 1972
- Ambrysus bispinus La Rivers, 1953
- Ambrysus bowlesi Reynoso & Sites, 2016-22
- Ambrysus brunneus Sites, 2015-23
- Ambrysus buenoi Usinger, 1946
- Ambrysus californicus Montandon, 1897
- Ambrysus calilegua López Ruf, 2007-01
- Ambrysus cayo Sites & Shepard, 2015-01
- Ambrysus chiapanecus Reynoso, Sites & Novelo, 2016-16
- Ambrysus circumcinctus Montandon, 1910
- Ambrysus colimanus J.Polhemus & D.Polhemus, 1981-01
- Ambrysus colombicus Montandon, 1909
- Ambrysus compressicollis Usinger
- Ambrysus contrerasi Reynoso & Sites, 2016-22
- Ambrysus convexus Usinger, 1946-01
- Ambrysus cosmius La Rivers, 1953
- Ambrysus crenulatus Montandon, 1897
- Ambrysus drakei La Rivers, 1957
- Ambrysus dyticus
- Ambrysus fittkaui De Carlo, 1956
- Ambrysus fossatus Usinger, 1946-01
- Ambrysus fraternus Montandon, 1897
- Ambrysus fucatus Berg, 1879
- Ambrysus funebris La Rivers, 1949
- Ambrysus fuscus Usinger, 1946-01
- Ambrysus geayi Montandon, 1897-01
- Ambrysus gemignanii De Carlo, 1950
- Ambrysus guttatipennis Stål, 1876
- Ambrysus harmodius La Rivers, 1962
- Ambrysus horvathi Montandon, 1909
- Ambrysus hungerfordi Usinger, 1946
- Ambrysus hybridus Montandon, 1897
- Ambrysus hydor La Rivers, 1953
- Ambrysus inflatus La Rivers, 1953
- Ambrysus infrageneric Ambrysus Wichi López Ruf
- Ambrysus itsipatsari Reynoso & Sites, 2016-22
- Ambrysus kolla López Ruf, 2004-01
- Ambrysus lamprus Nieser, Pelli & Melo, 1999-23
- Ambrysus lariversi Reynoso & Sites, 2016-19
- Ambrysus lattini La Rivers, 1976-01
- Ambrysus lunatus Usinger, 1946
- Ambrysus lundbladi Usinger, 1946-01
- Ambrysus magniceps La Rivers, 1953
- Ambrysus maldonadus La Rivers, 1954
- Ambrysus maya Sites & Reynoso, 2015-15
- Ambrysus melanopterus Stal, 1862
- Ambrysus mexicanus Montandon, 1897
- Ambrysus montandoni La Rivers, 1963
- Ambrysus mormon Montandon, 1909 (creeping water bug)
- Ambrysus noveloi Reynoso & Sites, 2016-22
- Ambrysus oblongulus Montandon, 1897
- Ambrysus obscuratus Montandon, 1898
- Ambrysus occidentalis La Rivers, 1951
- Ambrysus ochraceus Montandon, 1909
- Ambrysus partridgei De Carlo, 1968
- Ambrysus parviceps Montandon, 1897
- Ambrysus peruvianus Montandon, 1909
- Ambrysus planus La Rivers, 1951
- Ambrysus plautus J.Polhemus & D.Polhemus, 1983
- Ambrysus portheo La Rivers, 1953
- Ambrysus pudicus Stal, 1862
- Ambrysus pulchellus Montandon, 1897
- Ambrysus puncticollis Stål, 1876
- Ambrysus pygmaeus La Rivers, 1953
- Ambrysus quadracies La Rivers, 1976-01
- Ambrysus relictus Polhemus & Polhemus, 1994
- Ambrysus rotundus La Rivers, 1962
- Ambrysus scalenus La Rivers, 1953
- Ambrysus scolius La Rivers, 1970
- Ambrysus shorti Sites, 2015-23
- Ambrysus signoreti Stal, 1862
- Ambrysus siolii De Carlo, 1966
- Ambrysus sonorensis Usinger, 1946-01
- Ambrysus spiculus J.Polhemus & D.Polhemus, 1981-01
- Ambrysus stali La Rivers, 1962
- Ambrysus teutonius La Rivers, 1951
- Ambrysus thermarum La Rivers, 1953
- Ambrysus totonacus Reynoso, Sites & Novelo, 2016-16
- Ambrysus tricuspis La Rivers, 1974-15
- Ambrysus truncaticollis (De Carlo, 1935)
- Ambrysus ultimus La Rivers, 1976-01
- Ambrysus usingeri La Rivers, 1952
- Ambrysus vanduzeei Usinger, 1946-01
- Ambrysus variegatus Usinger, 1946-01
- Ambrysus veracruzanus Reynoso & Sites, 2016-22
- Ambrysus wichi López Ruf, 2013-01
- Ambrysus woodburyi Usinger, 1946
- Ambrysus xico Reynoso, Sites & Novelo, 2016-16
