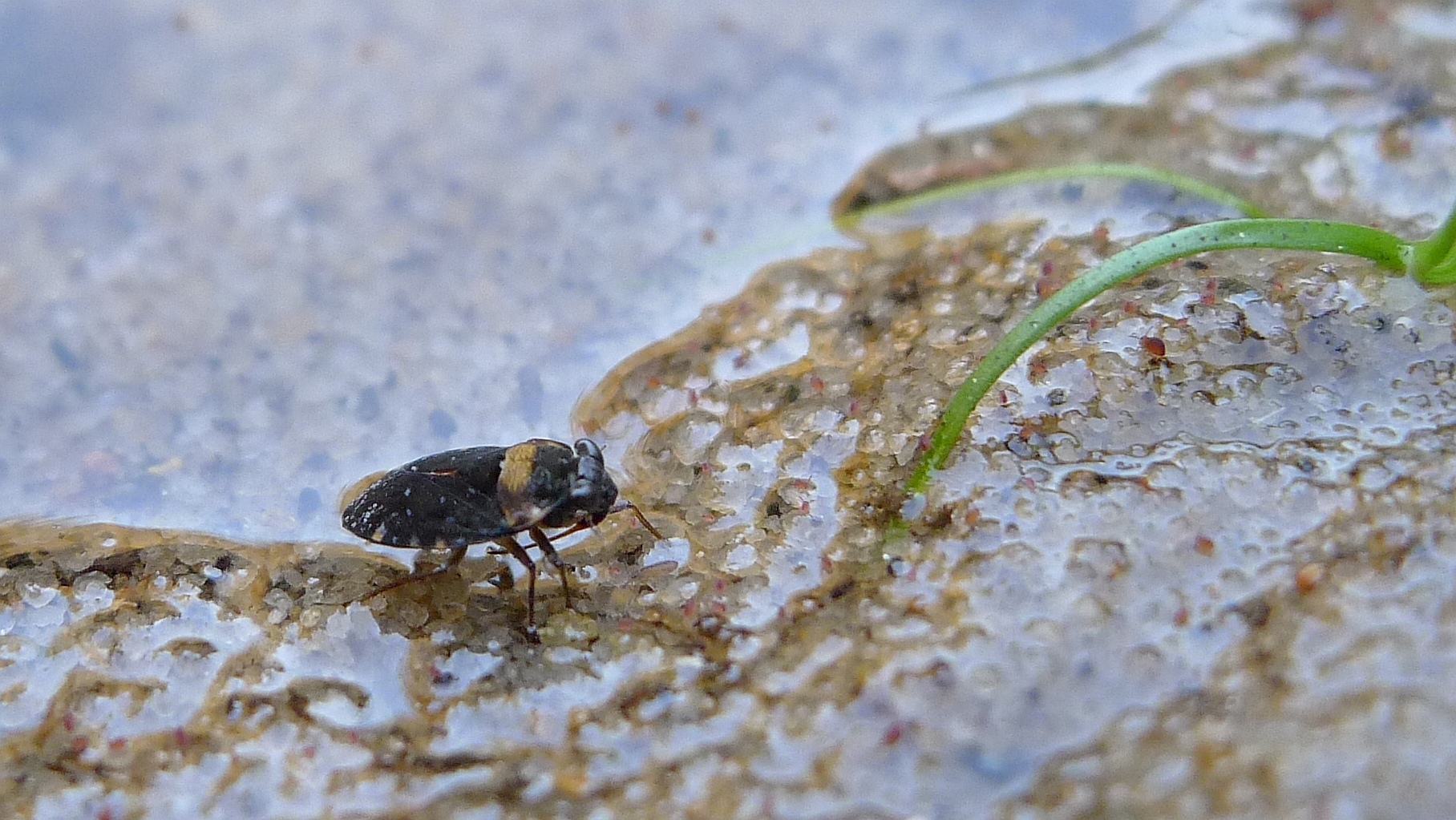

Scientific classification
- Kingdom: Animalia
- Phylum: Arthropoda
- Class: Insecta
- Order: Hemiptera
- Suborder: Heteroptera
- Family: Ochteridae
- Genus: Ochterus; Latreille, 1807

= Ochterus =

Genus of true bugs

Ochterus is a genus of velvety shore bugs in the family Ochteridae. There are more than 70 described species in Ochterus.

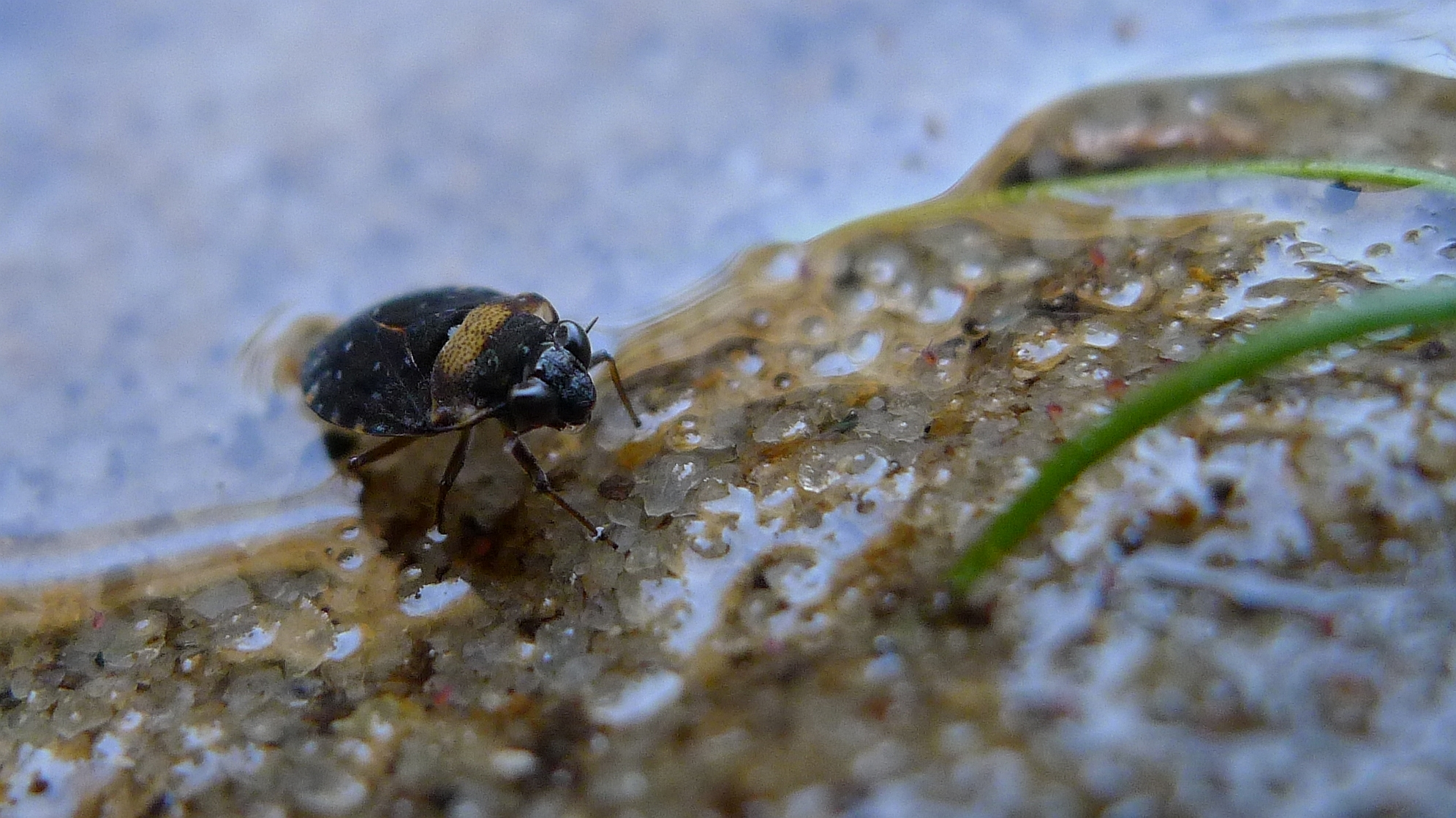

== Species ==
These 78 species belong to the genus Ochterus:

- Ochterus acutangulus (Champion, 1901)
- Ochterus aeneifrons (Champion, 1901)
- Ochterus aenifrons (Champion, 1901)
- Ochterus alticola Baehr, 1990
- Ochterus americanus (Uhler, 1876)
- Ochterus atridermis Baehr, 1989
- Ochterus australicus Jaczewski, 1934
- Ochterus bacchusi Baehr, 1990
- Ochterus baehri Rieger, 1977
- Ochterus baltazarae Gapud & San Valentin, 1977
- Ochterus banksi Barber, 1913
- Ochterus barberi Schell, 1943
- Ochterus barrosoi Gapud, 1981
- Ochterus bidentatus Schell, 1943
- Ochterus brachysoma Rieger, 1977
- Ochterus breviculus Nieser & Chen, 1992
- Ochterus bruneiensis Zettel & Lane, 2010
- Ochterus brunneus Hungerford, 1927
- Ochterus caffer Stål, 1855
- Ochterus cheesmannae Baehr, 1990
- Ochterus chiapensis D. Polhemus & J. Polhemus, 2016
- Ochterus costaricensis D. Polhemus & J. Polhemus, 2016
- Ochterus dufourii (Montrouzier, 1864)
- Ochterus eurythorax Baehr, 1989
- Ochterus explanatus D. Polhemus & J. Polhemus, 2016
- Ochterus feae Mancini, 1939
- Ochterus foersteri Kormilev & De Carlo, 1952
- Ochterus grandiusculus Nieser & Chen, 1992
- Ochterus gressitti Kormilev, 1971
- Ochterus homorfos Niesen & Chen, 1999
- Ochterus hungerfordi Schell, 1943
- Ochterus jaczewskii Kormilev, 1971
- Ochterus kokodae Baehr, 1990
- Ochterus latior Baehr, 1990
- Ochterus louisiadae Baehr, 1990
- Ochterus luzonicus Gapud, 2003
- Ochterus magnificus Gapud & San Valentin, 1977
- Ochterus magnus Gapud & San Valentin, 1977
- Ochterus manni Hungerford, 1927
- Ochterus marginatus (Latreille, 1804)
- Ochterus mexicanus D. Polhemus & J. Polhemus, 2016
- Ochterus minor Kormilev, 1973
- Ochterus monteithorum Baehr, 1990
- Ochterus nicobarensis Chandra & Jehamalar, 2012
- Ochterus nigrinus Baehr, 1990
- Ochterus noualhieri Baehr, 1990
- Ochterus obscurus D. Polhemus & J. Polhemus, 2016
- Ochterus occidentalis Baehr, 1990
- Ochterus ovatus D. Polhemus & J. Polhemus, 2016
- Ochterus panamensis D. Polhemus & J. Polhemus, 2016
- Ochterus papuasicus Kormilev, 1972
- Ochterus pardalos Niesen & Chen, 1999
- Ochterus parvus Schell, 1943
- Ochterus paucistriata Baehr, 1990
- Ochterus perbosci (Guérin-Méneville, 1843)
- Ochterus philippinensis Kormilev, 1971
- Ochterus piliferus Kormilev, 1973
- Ochterus polhemusi Gapud, 1981
- Ochterus pseudomarginatus D. Polhemus & J. Polhemus, 2012
- Ochterus pseudorotundus D. Polhemus & J. Polhemus, 2016
- Ochterus rotundus J. Polhemus & M. Polhemus, 1976
- Ochterus santosi Cordeiro & Moreira in Cordeiro et al., 2014
- Ochterus schellae Drake, 1952
- Ochterus secundus Kormilev, 1971
- Ochterus seychellensis D. Polhemus, 1992
- Ochterus shepardi D. Polhemus & J. Polhemus, 2016
- Ochterus signatus D. Polhemus & J. Polhemus, 2012
- Ochterus singaporensis D. Polhemus & J. Polhemus, 2012
- Ochterus smaragdinus D. Polhemus & J. Polhemus, 2016
- Ochterus stysi D. Polhemus & J. Polhemus, 2008
- Ochterus surigaoensis Gapud, 1995
- Ochterus tenebrosus Nieser, 1975
- Ochterus thienemanni Jaczewski, 1935
- Ochterus trichotos Niesen & Chen, 1999
- Ochterus unidentatus Nieser & Chen, 1992
- Ochterus viridifrons (Champion, 1901)
- Ochterus xustos Nieser & Chen, 1992
- Ochterus zetteli Gapud, 2003
