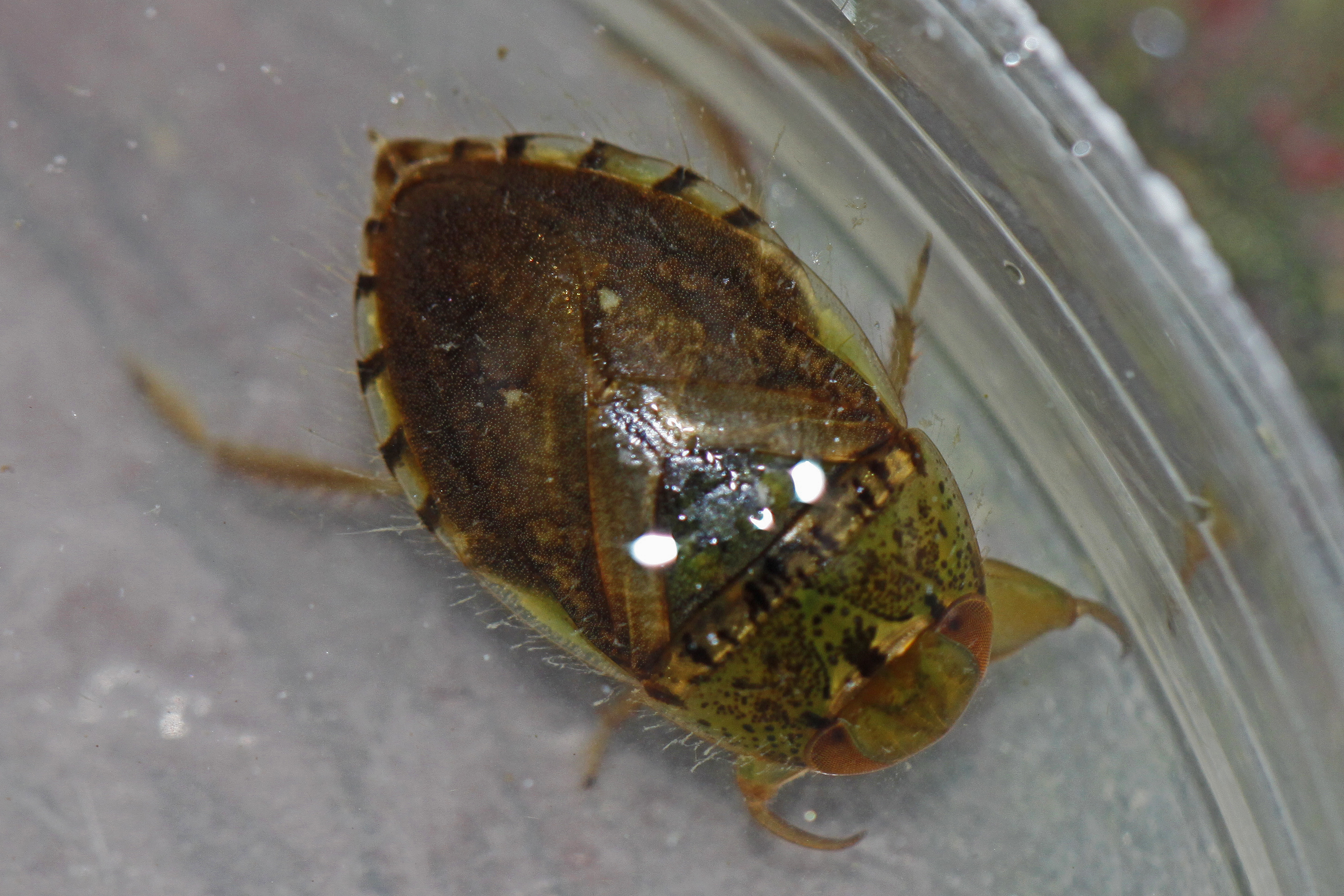

Scientific classification
- Domain: Eukaryota
- Kingdom: Animalia
- Phylum: Arthropoda
- Class: Insecta
- Order: Hemiptera
- Suborder: Heteroptera
- Family: Naucoridae
- Genus: Pelocoris
- Species: P. femoratus

Binomial name
- Pelocoris femoratus (Palisot de Beauvois, 1820)

Synonyms
- Naucoris femorata Palisot de Beauvois, 1820

= Pelocoris femoratus =

Species of true bug

Pelocoris femoratus is a species of creeping water bug in the family Naucoridae. It is found in Central America, North America, and South America. They prefer still water with a high density of vegetation and eggs are laid on submerged plants. They feed on other arthropods and actively catch them while swimming. They are active from spring to autumn and can give a painful bite if not handled properly.
