= Sagocoris =

Scientific classification
- Domain: Eukaryota
- Kingdom: Animalia
- Phylum: Arthropoda
- Class: Insecta
- Order: Hemiptera
- Suborder: Heteroptera
- Family: Naucoridae
- Genus: Sagocoris; Montandon, 1911

Genus of insects

Sagocoris is a genus of true bugs belonging to the family Naucoridae.

The species of this genus are found in Australia.

Species:

- Sagocoris asymmetricus (La Rivers, 1971)
- Sagocoris biroi Montandon, 1911
- Sagocoris flavinotum Polhemus & Polhemus, 1999
- Sagocoris gressitti La Rivers, 1971
- Sagocoris intermedius Polhemus & Polhemus, 1999
- Sagocoris irianus Polhemus & Polhemus, 1999
- Sagocoris lariversae La Rivers, 1971
