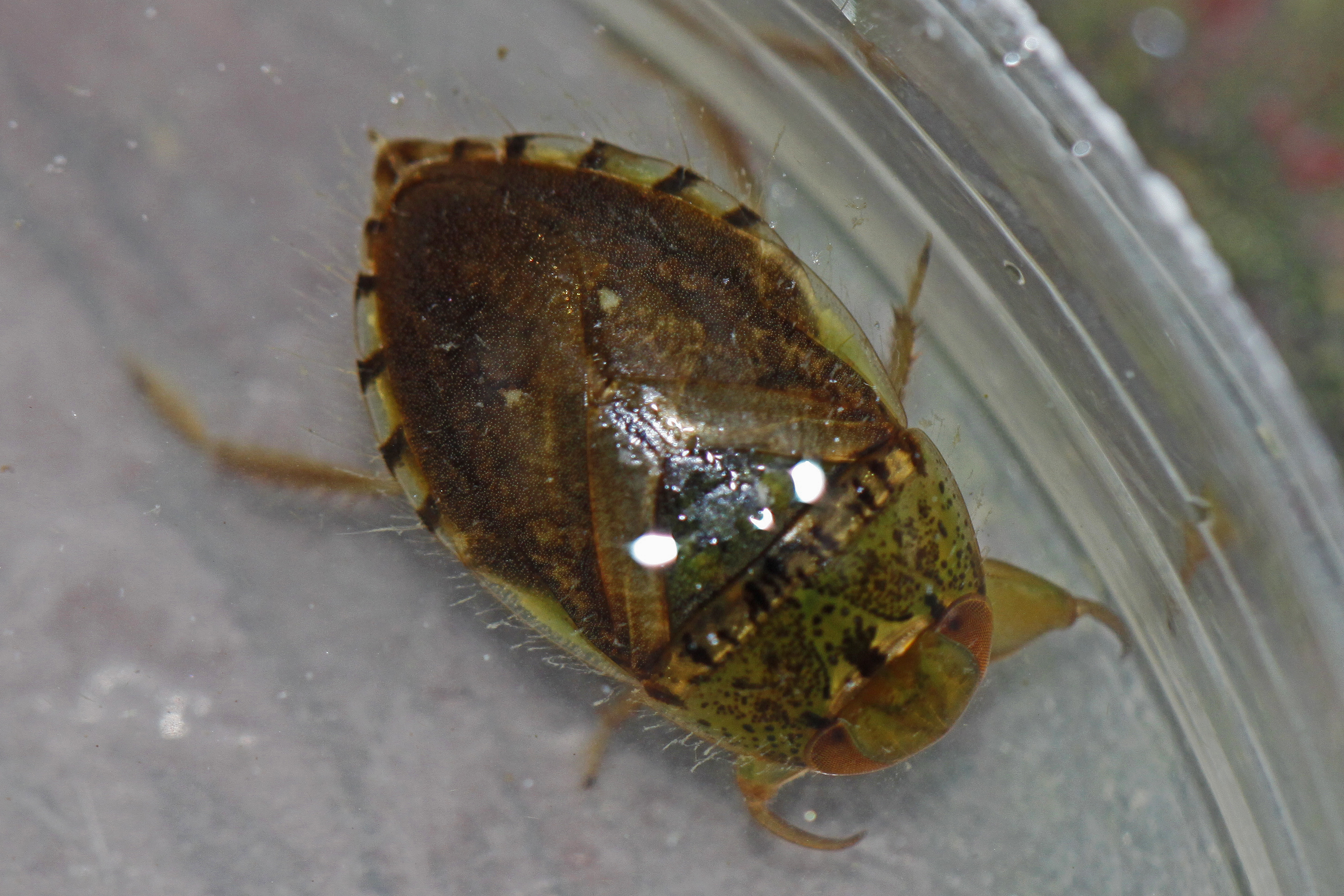
- Pelocoris femoratus

Scientific classification
- Kingdom: Animalia
- Phylum: Arthropoda
- Clade: Pancrustacea
- Class: Insecta
- Order: Hemiptera
- Suborder: Heteroptera
- Family: Naucoridae
- Genus: Pelocoris; Stål, 1876

= Pelocoris =

Genus of insects

Pelocoris is a genus of creeping water bugs in the family Naucoridae found in the Americas. There are about 15 described species in Pelocoris.

== Species ==
These 15 species belong to the genus Pelocoris:

- Pelocoris balius La Rivers, 1970
- Pelocoris biimpressus Montandon, 1898
- Pelocoris binotulatus (Stål, 1860)
- Pelocoris bipunctulus (Herrich-Schäffer, 1853)
- Pelocoris carolinensis Torre-Bueno, 1907
- Pelocoris femoratus (Palisot de Beauvois, 1820)
- Pelocoris magister Montandon, 1898
- Pelocoris megistus La Rivers, 1969
- Pelocoris nepaeformis (Fabricius, 1803)
- Pelocoris nitidus Montandon, 1898
- Pelocoris poeyi (Guérin-Ménéville, 1838)
- Pelocoris politus Montandon, 1897
- Pelocoris procurrens White, 1879
- Pelocoris subflavus Montandon, 1898
