= Naucoris =

Scientific classification
- Domain: Eukaryota
- Kingdom: Animalia
- Phylum: Arthropoda
- Class: Insecta
- Order: Hemiptera
- Suborder: Heteroptera
- Family: Naucoridae
- Genus: Naucoris; Fabricius, 1775

Genus of true bugs

External image
- Images at iNaturalist

Naucoris is the type genus of the water bug family Naucoridae.

The species of this genus are found in Europe, Africa, Australia and Asia.

== Species ==
The Global Biodiversity Information Facility lists:

1. Naucoris australicus Stål, 1876
2. Naucoris ciliatistylus Linnavuori, 1971
3. Naucoris congrex Stål, 1876
4. Naucoris crassus Piton & Theobald, 1935
5. Naucoris dilatatus Heer, 1853
6. Naucoris fuscipennis Schaum, 1853
7. Naucoris kenyalis Poisson, 1949
8. Naucoris lapidarius Weyenbergh, 1869
9. Naucoris maculatus Fabricius, 1798
10. Naucoris madagascariensis Montandon, 1899
11. Naucoris magela Lansbury, 1991
12. Naucoris obscuratus Montandon, 1913
13. Naucoris obscuripennis Stål, 1854
14. Naucoris parvulus Signoret, 1869
15. Naucoris perezi Bolivar, 1879
16. Naucoris planus Germar, 1837
17. Naucoris pumilus Zettel, Nieser & D.Polhemus, 1999
18. Naucoris rhizomatus J.Polhemus, 1984
19. Naucoris rottensis Schlechtendal, 1899
20. Naucoris sigaloeis La Rivers, 1974
21. Naucoris subaureus Lansbury, 1985
22. Naucoris subopacus Montandon, 1913
23. Naucoris sumatranus Fieber, 1851
