= Actinocoris =

Scientific classification
- Kingdom: Animalia
- Phylum: Arthropoda
- Class: Insecta
- Order: Hemiptera
- Suborder: Heteroptera
- Family: Miridae
- Genus: Actinocoris; Reuter, 1878

Genus of true bugs

Actinocoris is a genus of true bugs belonging to the family Miridae.

Species:

- Actinocoris signatus Reuter, 1878
