= Robert L. Usinger =

American entomologist (1912–1968)

Robert Leslie Usinger (October 24, 1912, Fort Bragg, California – October 1, 1968, San Francisco) was an American entomologist and professor at the University of California, Berkeley and the University of California, Davis. A fellow of the Linnean Society of London, he served as president of the Entomological Society of America in 1965–1966. Prior to his appointment as their president, he was their fellow, starting from 1951. He produced over 250 publications, including several popular books, and was known as an expert on the Hemiptera, the "true bugs".
