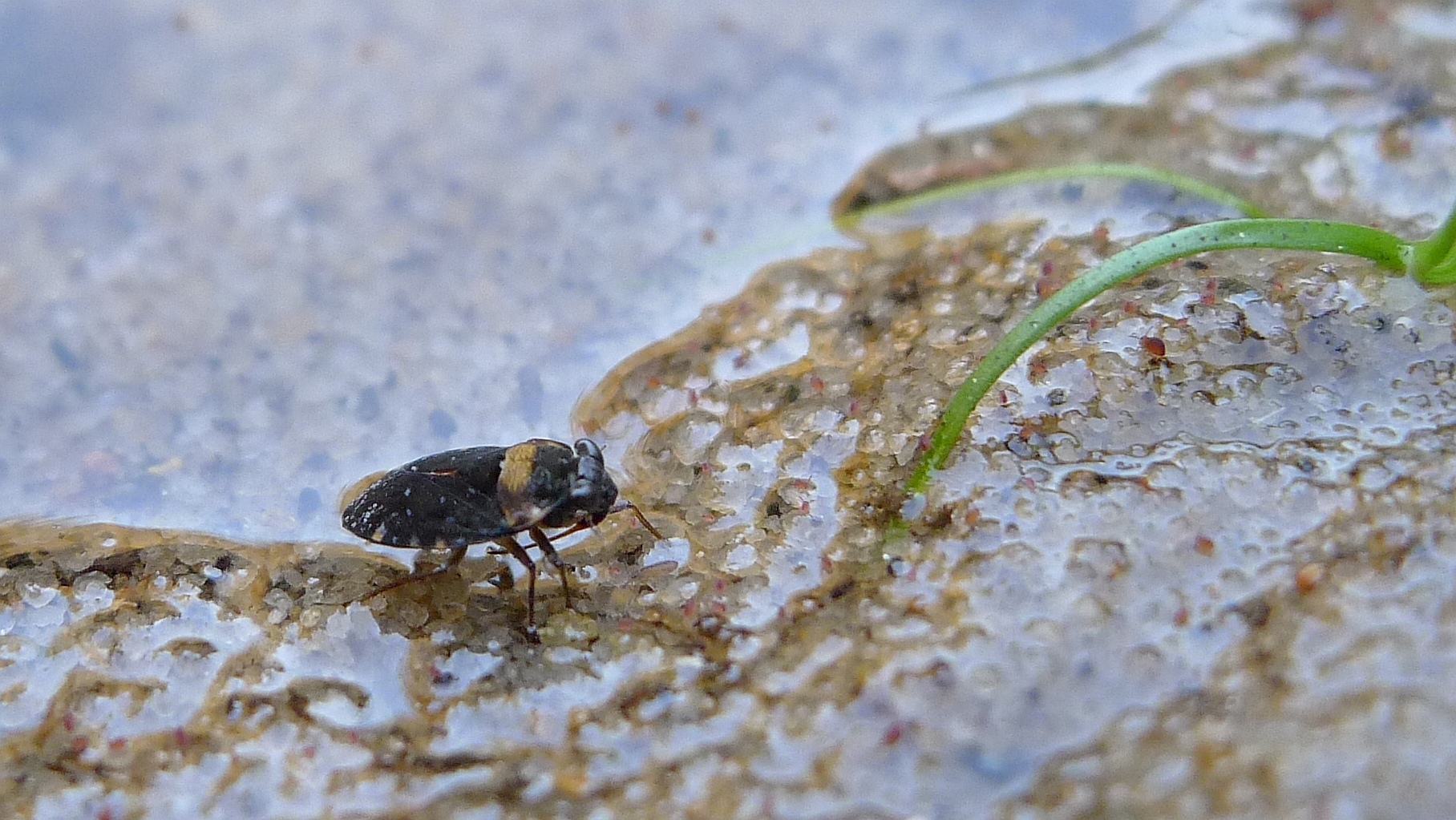
- Ochterus

Scientific classification
- Kingdom: Animalia
- Phylum: Arthropoda
- Clade: Pancrustacea
- Class: Insecta
- Order: Hemiptera
- Suborder: Heteroptera
- Infraorder: Nepomorpha
- Clade: Tripartita
- Superfamily: Ochteroidea
- Family: Ochteridae; Kirkaldy, 1906

= Ochteridae =

Velvety shore bugs

Family of true bugs

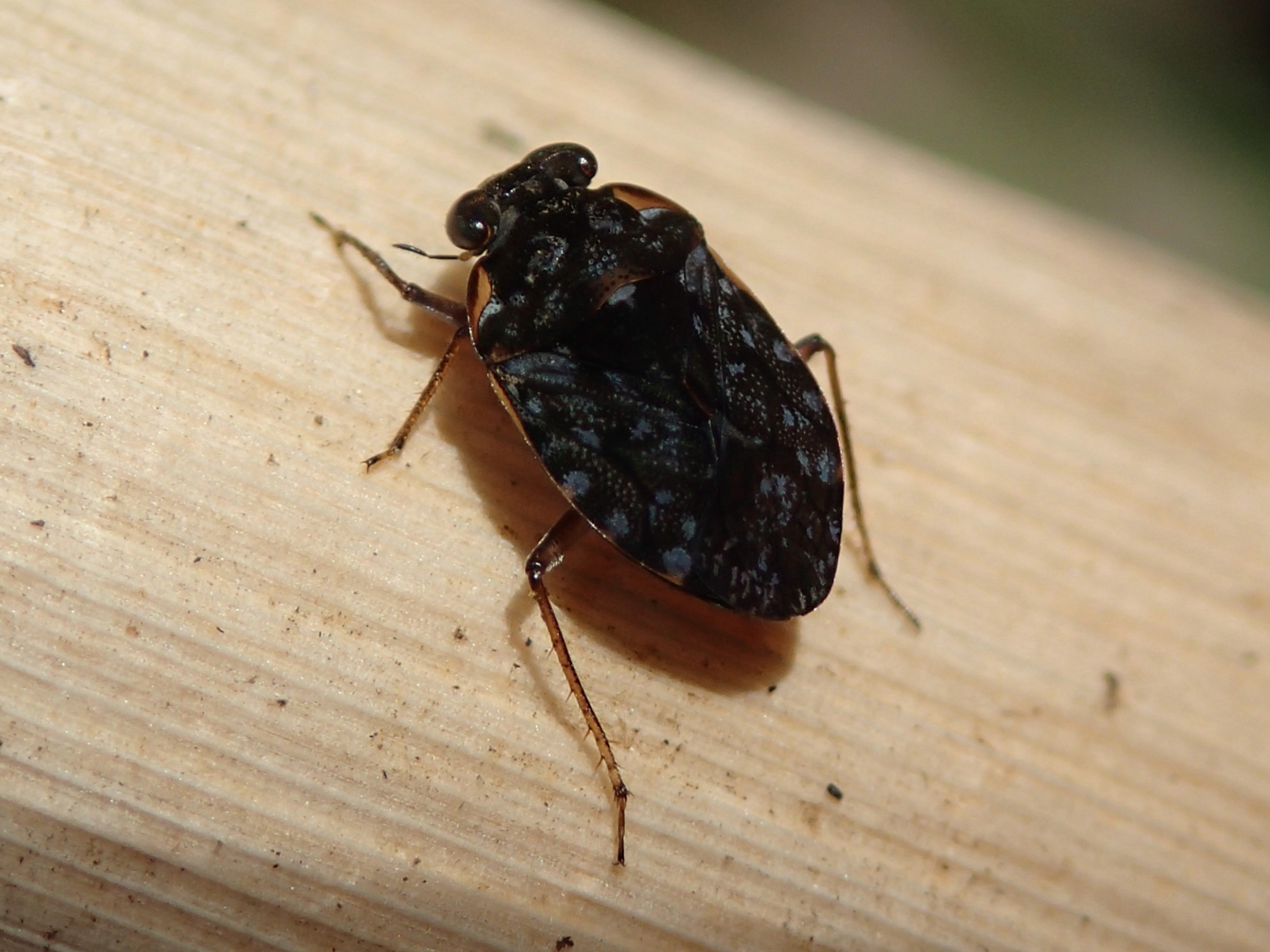
Ochterus marginatus

The Ochteridae comprise a small family of insects. Eight genera with about 80 species have been described. They occur worldwide along the shore of various types of water (for example, streams and ponds) and the greatest diversity is in tropical regions. They are "true bugs", being members of the order Hemiptera, and are in the suborder Heteroptera. Ochteridae commonly are known as the velvety shore bugs. They resemble the Saldidae shore bugs and have lengths ranging from 4.5 to 9 mm (0.18–0.35 in).

Most of the Ochteridae inhabit the edges of ponds and other still waters. Little is known of their habits, but all are believed to predate on small invertebrates, such as larvae of flies. They tend to be lively and capable of active leaping and flight.

The immature instars of some species camouflage themselves extremely effectively by gluing sand grains and similar particles to their backs, and so do the adults of a few species. They are not conspicuous and most species are physically small and occur patchily and in small numbers; these factors make them difficult to study and partly explain why there is a poverty of detailed knowledge of the biology of most species.

== Genera ==
These eight genera belong to the family Ochteridae:

- Angulochterus Yao, Zhang and Ren in Yao et al., 2011^{i c g}
- Floricaudus Yao, Ren and Shih in Yao et al., 2011^{i c g}
- Megochterus Jaczewski, 1934^{i c g}
- Ochterus Latreille, 1807^{i c g b}
- Ocyochterus Drake and Gómez-Menor, 1954^{i c g}
- Pristinochterus Yao, Cai and Ren, 2007^{i c g}
- Propreocoris Popov, Dolling & Whalley, 1994^{g}
- Riegerochterus Popov and Heiss, 2014^{i c g}

Data sources: i = ITIS, c = Catalogue of Life, g = GBIF, b = Bugguide.net
