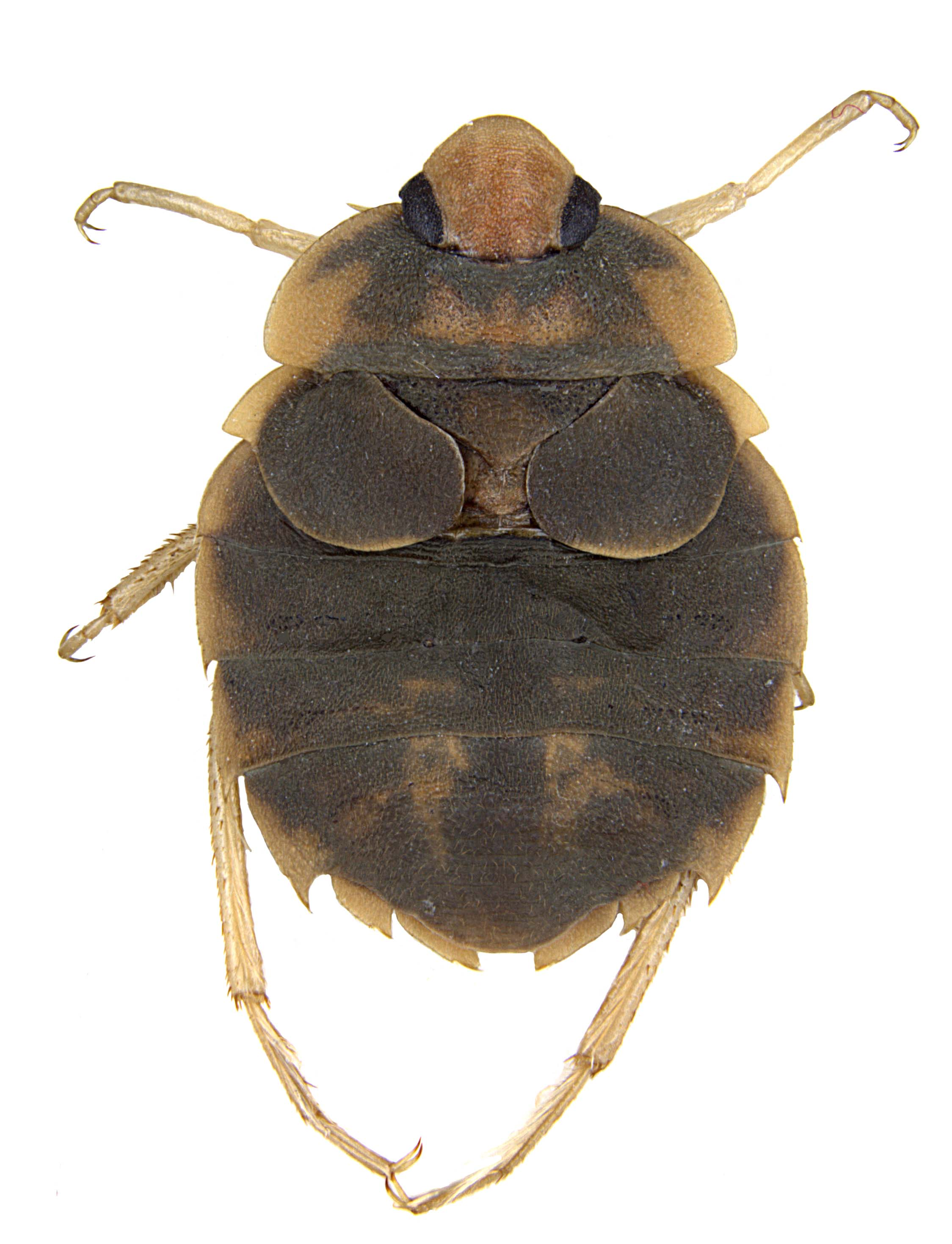
- Aphelocheirus aestivalis

Scientific classification
- Kingdom: Animalia
- Phylum: Arthropoda
- Clade: Pancrustacea
- Class: Insecta
- Order: Hemiptera
- Suborder: Heteroptera
- Family: Aphelocheiridae
- Genus: Aphelocheirus; Westwood, 1833

= Aphelocheirus =

Genus of true bugs

Aphelocheirus is a genus of true bugs, the only genus belonging to the family Aphelocheiridae.

The genus was first described by John O. Westwood in 1833.

The genus has almost cosmopolitan distribution.

== Species ==
The GBIF lists 109 accepted species for this genus, including:

- Aphelocheirus aestivalis (Fabricius, 1794)
- Aphelocheirus altigradus Zettel, 1998
- Aphelocheirus amplus Liu & Zheng, 1994
- Aphelocheirus amurensis Kiritshenko, 1925
- Aphelocheirus apicalis Tran & Nguyen, 2016
- Aphelocheirus ashlocki D. Polhemus & J. Polhemus, 1989
- Aphelocheirus australis Usinger, 1937
- Aphelocheirus baguio D. Polhemus & J. Polhemus, 1989
- Aphelocheirus bengkulu D. Polhemus, 1994
- Aphelocheirus bianchii Kiritshenko, 1933
- Aphelocheirus boukali Zettel, 2000
- Aphelocheirus breviceps Horváth, 1895
- Aphelocheirus breviculus Nieser & Chen, 1991
- Aphelocheirus bruneiensis Zettel, Lane & Moore, 2008
- Aphelocheirus brunneus Liu & Zheng, 2000
- Aphelocheirus cantonensis D. Polhemus & J. Polhemus, 1989
- Aphelocheirus carinatus Royer, 1920
- Aphelocheirus celebensis D. Polhemus & J. Polhemus, 1989
- Aphelocheirus corbeti Poisson, 1955
- Aphelocheirus debilis Kiritshenko, 1925
- Aphelocheirus denticeps Montandon, 1919
- Aphelocheirus dudgeoni D. Polhemus & J. Polhemus, 1989
- Aphelocheirus ellipsoideus Liu & Ding, 2005
- Aphelocheirus fang D. Polhemus & J. Polhemus, 1989
- Aphelocheirus femoratus D. Polhemus & J. Polhemus, 1989
- Aphelocheirus fischeri Zettel, 2009
- Aphelocheirus flavinotatus Tran & Nguyen, 2016
- Aphelocheirus freitagi Zettel & Pangantihon, 2010
- Aphelocheirus gapudi Zettel, 1999
- Aphelocheirus geros Nieser & Chen, 1996
- Aphelocheirus goellnerae Zettel, 2012
- Aphelocheirus grik D. Polhemus & J. Polhemus, 1989
