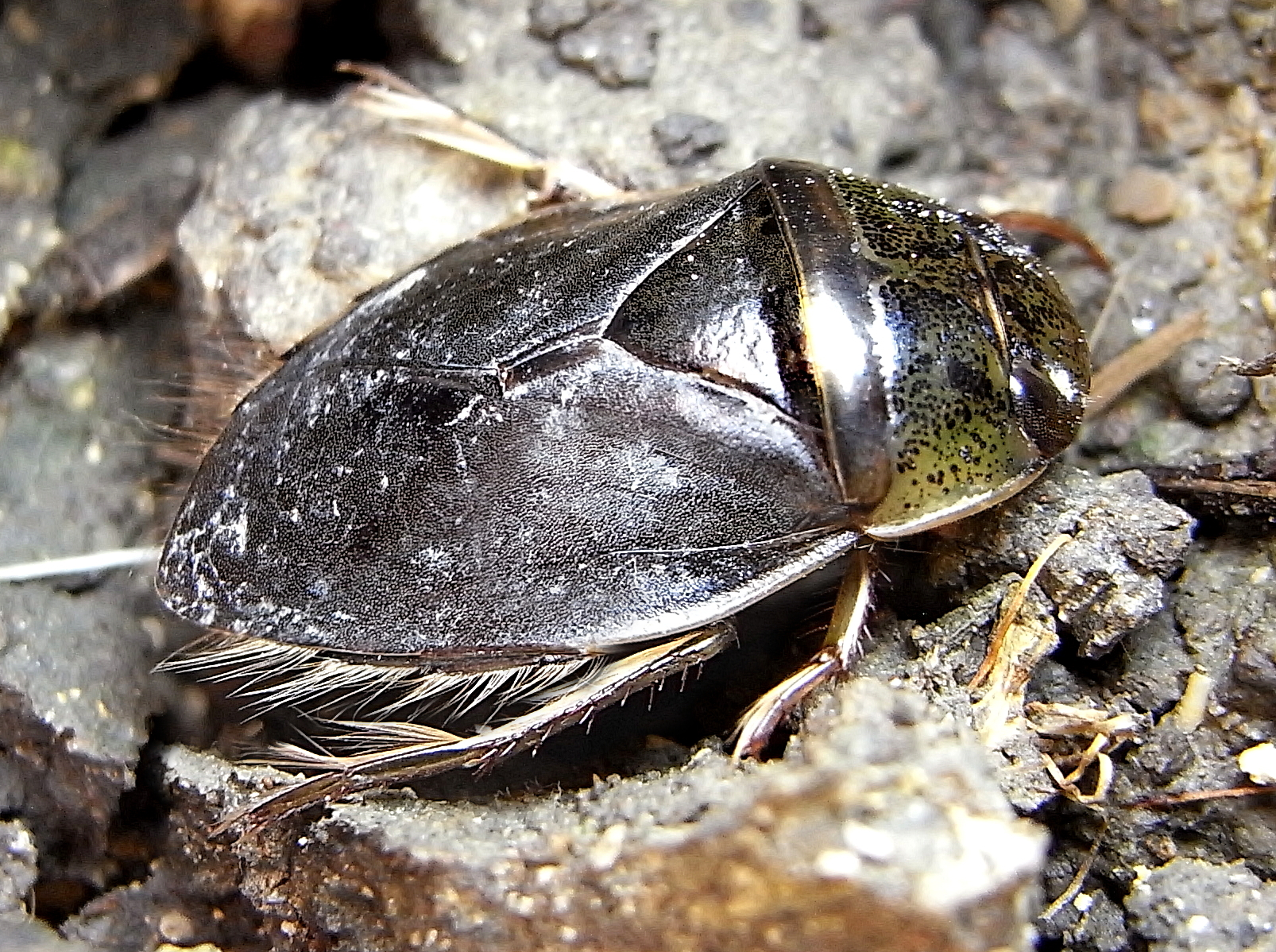
- Ilyocoris cimicoides

Scientific classification
- Kingdom: Animalia
- Phylum: Arthropoda
- Clade: Pancrustacea
- Class: Insecta
- Order: Hemiptera
- Suborder: Heteroptera
- Infraorder: Nepomorpha
- Family: Naucoridae; Leach, 1815

Type genus
- Naucoris Geoffroy, 1762

Subfamilies
- Ambrysinae; Cheirochelinae; Cryphocricinae; Ilyocorinae; Laccocorinae; Limnocorinae; Macrocorinae; Naucorinae

= Naucoridae =

Creeping water bugs

Family of true bugs

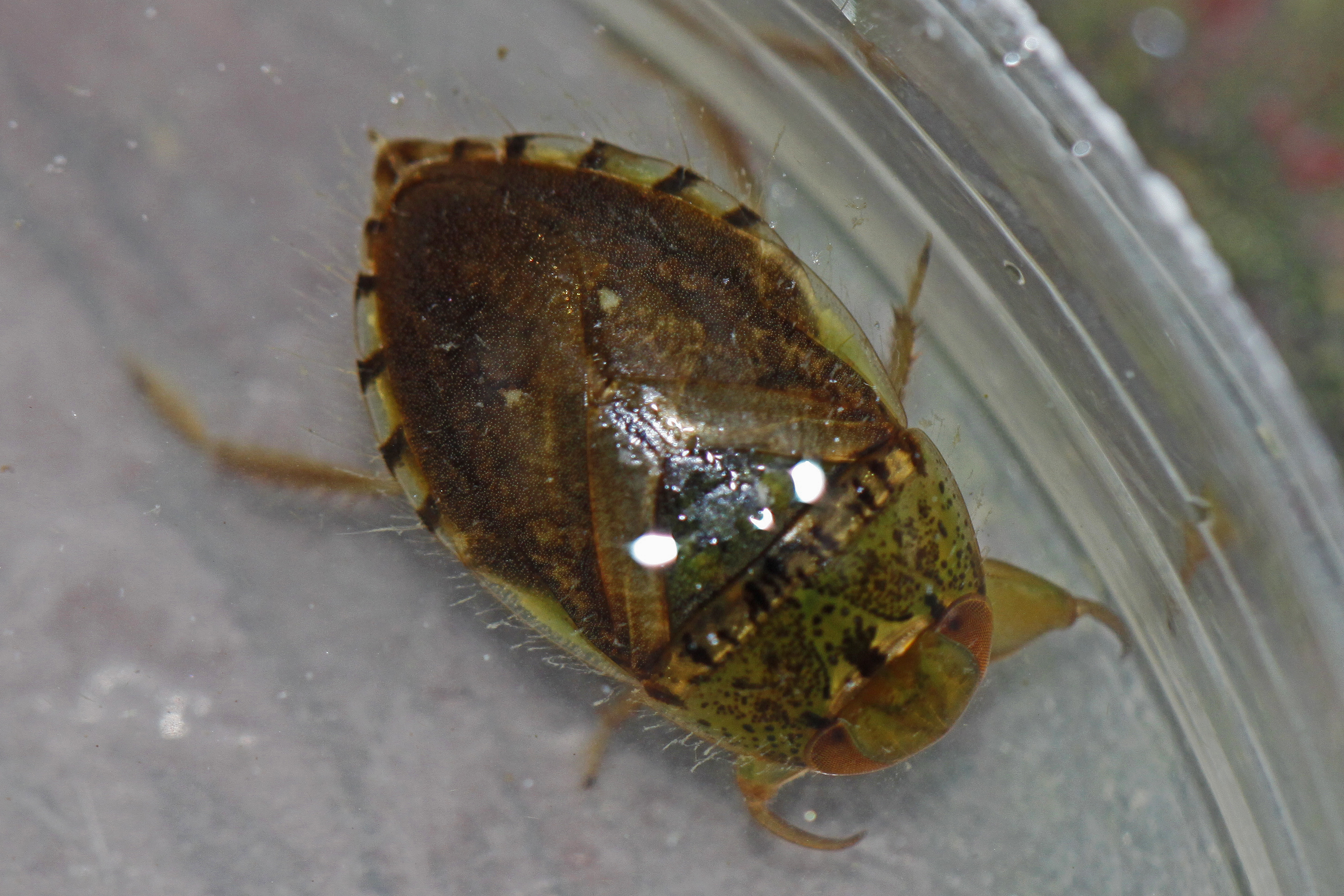
Pelocoris femoratus

Naucoridae is a small family of insects commonly known as the creeping water bugs and saucer bugs. They are similar in appearance and behavior to Belostomatidae (giant water bugs), but considerably smaller, at 0.5–2 cm (0.2–0.8 in) long. Naucoridae are found around the world, but the greatest diversity is in tropical regions. They inhabit a wide range of freshwater habitats, ranging from still waters like ponds, to flowing rivers and even torrential streams. There are eight subfamilies containing about 400 species in 46 genera. One of these subfamilies is Pelocoris, and the species within this group are usually found in ponds or quiet bodies of water. They are predators that feed on other small invertebrates.

They were formerly united in a superfamily Naucoroidea with the Aphelocheiridae and Potamocoridae, but these are now in their own superfamily (Aphelocheiroidea) and the Naucoroidea are monotypic.

== Genera ==
These 46 genera belong to the family Naucoridae:

- Afronaucoris Sites, 2022
- Ambrysus Stål, 1862
- Aneurocoris Montandon, 1897
- Aptinocoris Montandon, 1897
- Asthenocoris Usinger, 1937
- Australambrysus Reynoso & Sites, 2021
- Australonaucoris Sites, 2022
- Carvalhoiella De Carlo, 1963
- Cataractocoris Usinger, 1941
- Calocoris La Rivers, 1971
- Cheirochela Hope, 1840
- Coptocatus Montandon, 1909
- Cryphocricos Signoret, 1850
- Ctenipocoris Montandon, 1897
- Decarloa La Rivers, 1969
- Diaphorocoris Montandon, 1897
- Gestroiella Montandon, 1897
- Halmaheria Zettel, 2007
- Heleocoris Stål, 1876
- Heleolaccocoris Sites, 2022
- Hygropetrocoris Sites, 2015
- Idiocerus Montandon, 1897
- Ilyocoris Stål, 1861
- Indonaucoris Sites, 2022
- Interocoris La Rivers, 1974
- Laccocoris Stål, 1856
- Limnocoris Stål, 1858
- Macrocoris Signoret, 1861
- Maculambrysus Reynoso & Sites, 2021
- Melloiella De Carlo, 1935
- Namtokocoris Sites, 2007
- Nanonaucoris Zettel, 2001
- Naucoris Geoffroy, 1762
- Neomacrocoris Montandon, 1913
- Nesocricos La Rivers, 1971
- Pelocoris Stål, 1876
- Philippinocoris D. Polhemus & J. Polhemus, 1987
- Picrops La Rivers, 1952
- Placomerus La Rivers, 1956
- Procryphocricos J. Polhemus, 1991
- Sagocoris Montandon, 1911
- Stalocoris La Rivers, 1969
- Tanycricos La Rivers, 1971
- Temnocoris Montandon, 1897
- Tsingala Sites, 2022
- Warisia La Rivers, 1971
