= List of Hydrometra species =

This is a list of 122 species in Hydrometra, a genus of water measurers in the family Hydrometridae.

== Hydrometra species ==
- Hydrometra acapulcana Drake, 1952^{i c g}
- Hydrometra aculeata Montrouzier in Perroud, 1864^{i c g}
- Hydrometra adnexa Drake, 1956^{i c g}
- Hydrometra aegyptia Hungerford and Evans, 1934^{i c g}
- Hydrometra aemula Drake, 1956^{i c g}
- Hydrometra aequatoriana Cianferoni and Buzzetti, 2012^{i c g}
- Hydrometra africana Hungerford and Evans, 1934^{i c g}
- Hydrometra albolineata (Scott, 1874)^{i c g}
- Hydrometra albolineolata Reuter, 1882^{i c g}
- Hydrometra alloiona Drake and Lauck, 1959^{i c g}
- Hydrometra ambulator Stål, 1855^{i c g}
- Hydrometra annamana Hungerford and Evans, 1934^{i c g}
- Hydrometra argentina Berg, 1879^{i c g}
- Hydrometra australis Say, 1832^{i c g b}
- Hydrometra balkei Zettel, 2014^{i c g}
- Hydrometra barei Hungerford, 1927^{i c g}
- Hydrometra barrana Drake, 1952^{i c g}
- Hydrometra bifurcata Hungerford and Evans, 1934^{i c g}
- Hydrometra borneensis Zettel and Yang, 2004^{i c g}
- Hydrometra brevitarsus Zettel and Yang, 2004^{i c g}
- Hydrometra butleri Hungerford and Evans, 1934^{i c g}
- Hydrometra caraiba Guérin-Méneville, 1857^{i c g}
- Hydrometra carayoni Poisson, 1948^{i c g}
- Hydrometra carinata J. Polhemus and D. Polhemus, 1995^{i c g}
- Hydrometra cavernicola J. Polhemus and D. Polhemus, 1987^{i c g}
- Hydrometra chaweewanae Sites and J. Polhemus, 2003^{i c g}
- Hydrometra cherukolensis Jehamalar and Chandra, 2014^{i c g}
- Hydrometra chinai Hungerford and Evans, 1934^{i c g}
- Hydrometra chopardi Poisson, 1941^{i c g}
- Hydrometra ciliata Mychajliw, 1961^{i c g}
- Hydrometra ciliosa Drake and Lauck, 1959^{i c g}
- Hydrometra claudie J. Polhemus and Lansbury, 1997^{i c g}
- Hydrometra comata Torre-Bueno, 1926^{i c g}
- Hydrometra consimilis Barber, 1923^{i c g}
- Hydrometra cracens J. Polhemus and D. Polhemus, 1995^{i c g}
- Hydrometra crossa Drake and Lauck, 1959^{i c g}
- Hydrometra cyprina Torre-Bueno, 1926^{i c g}
- Hydrometra darwiniana J. Polhemus and Lansbury, 1997^{i c g}
- Hydrometra eioana J. Polhemus and Lansbury, 1997^{i c g}
- Hydrometra exalla Drake and Lauck, 1959^{i c g}
- Hydrometra exilis Torre-Bueno, 1926^{i c g}
- Hydrometra fanjahira Hungerford and Evans, 1934^{i c g}
- Hydrometra feta Hale, 1925^{i c g}
- Hydrometra fruhstorferi Hungerford and Evans, 1934^{i c g}
- Hydrometra fuanucana Drake, 1954^{i c g}
- Hydrometra gagnei J. Polhemus and D. Polhemus, 1995^{i c g}
- Hydrometra gibara Torre-Bueno, 1926^{i c g}
- Hydrometra gilloglyi J. Polhemus and D. Polhemus, 1995^{i c g}
- Hydrometra goodi Hungerford, 1951^{i c g}
- Hydrometra gracilenta Horváth, 1899^{i c g}
- Hydrometra grassei Poisson, 1945^{i c g}
- Hydrometra greeni Kirkaldy, 1898^{i c g}
- Hydrometra groehni Andersen, 2003^{i c g}
- Hydrometra guianana Hungerford and Evans, 1934^{i c g}
- Hydrometra halei Hungerford and Evans, 1934^{i c g}
- Hydrometra heoki Zettel and Yang, 2004^{i c g}
- Hydrometra horvathi Hungerford and Evans, 1934^{i c g}
- Hydrometra huallagana Drake, 1954^{i c g}
- Hydrometra hungerfordi Torre-Bueno, 1926^{i c g}
- Hydrometra hutchinsoni Hungerford and Evans, 1934^{i c g}
- Hydrometra intonsa Drake and Hottes, 1952^{i c g}
- Hydrometra isaka Hungerford and Evans, 1934^{i c g}
- Hydrometra jaczewskii Lundblad, 1933^{i c g}
- Hydrometra jourama J. Polhemus and Lansbury, 1997^{i c g}
- Hydrometra juba Linnavuori, 1971^{i c g}
- Hydrometra julieni Hungerford and Evans, 1934^{i c g}
- Hydrometra julienoidea J. Polhemus and D. Polhemus, 1995^{i c g}
- Hydrometra kahallensis Karunaratne, 1969^{i c g}
- Hydrometra kelantan J. Polhemus and D. Polhemus, 1995^{i c g}
- Hydrometra kiunga J. Polhemus and Lansbury, 1997^{i c g}
- Hydrometra lentipes Champion, 1898^{i c g}
- Hydrometra lillianis Torre-Bueno, 1926^{i c g}
- Hydrometra lineata Eschscholtz, 1822^{i c g}
- Hydrometra lombok J. Polhemus and D. Polhemus, 1995^{i c g}
- Hydrometra longicapitis Torre-Bueno, 1927^{i c g}
- Hydrometra madagascarensis Hungerford and Evans, 1934^{i c g}
- Hydrometra maidli Hungerford and Evans, 1934^{i c g}
- Hydrometra maindroni Hungerford and Evans, 1934^{i c g}
- Hydrometra mameti Hungerford, 1951^{i c g}
- Hydrometra marani Hoberlandt, 1942^{i c g}
- Hydrometra martini Kirkaldy, 1900^{i c g b}
- Hydrometra metator Buchanan-White, 1879^{i c g}
- Hydrometra mindoroensis J. Polhemus in J. Polhemus and Reisen, 1976^{i c g}
- Hydrometra moneta Linnavuori, 1981^{i c g}
- Hydrometra monodi Poisson, 1939^{i c g}
- Hydrometra naiades Kirkaldy, 1902^{i c g}
- Hydrometra nicobarensis Jehamalar and Chandra, 2014^{i c g}
- Hydrometra novaehollandiae J. Polhemus and Lansbury, 1997^{i c g}
- Hydrometra okinawana Drake, 1951^{i c g}
- Hydrometra olallai Mychajliw, 1961^{i c g}
- Hydrometra orientalis Lundblad, 1933^{i c g}
- Hydrometra panamensis Drake, 1952^{i c g}
- Hydrometra papuana Kirkaldy, 1901^{i c g}
- Hydrometra phytophila J. Polhemus and D. Polhemus, 1987^{i c g}
- Hydrometra placita Drake, 1953^{i c g}
- Hydrometra poissoni Hungerford, 1951^{i c g}
- Hydrometra priscillae Torre-Bueno, 1926^{i c g}
- Hydrometra procera Horváth, 1905^{i c g}
- Hydrometra quadrispina Perez Goodwyn, 2001^{i c g}
- Hydrometra rhodesiana Hungerford and Evans, 1934^{i c g}
- Hydrometra ribesci Hungerford, 1938^{g}
- Hydrometra ripicola Andersen, 1992^{i c g}
- Hydrometra sapiranga Moreira and Barbosa, 2013^{i c g}
- Hydrometra scotti Brown, 1951^{i c g}
- Hydrometra seychellensis J. Polhemus and D. Polhemus, 1995^{i c g}
- Hydrometra sjoestedti Lundblad, 1934^{i c g}
- Hydrometra smithi Hungerford and Evans, 1934^{i c g}
- Hydrometra somaliensis Poisson, 1949^{i c g}
- Hydrometra stagnorum (Linnaeus, 1758)^{i c g}
- Hydrometra strigosa (Skuse, 1893)^{i c g}
- Hydrometra sztolcmani Jaczewski, 1928^{i c g}
- Hydrometra taxcana Drake and Hottes, 1952^{i c g}
- Hydrometra thomasi Mychajliw, 1961^{i c g}
- Hydrometra transvaalensis Hungerford and Evans, 1934^{i c g}
- Hydrometra turneri Hungerford and Evans, 1934^{i c g}
- Hydrometra ugandae Jaczewski, 1932^{i c g}
- Hydrometra wileyae Hungerford, 1923^{i c g}
- Hydrometra williamsi Hungerford and Evans, 1934^{i c g}
- Hydrometra yamoussoukroi Poisson, 1945^{i c g}
- Hydrometra yaqubi Ghauri, 1964^{i c g}
- Hydrometra zeteki Drake, 1952^{i c g}
- Hydrometra zeylanica Gunawardane and Karunaratne, 1965^{i c g}

Data sources: i = ITIS, c = Catalogue of Life, g = GBIF, b = Bugguide.net
