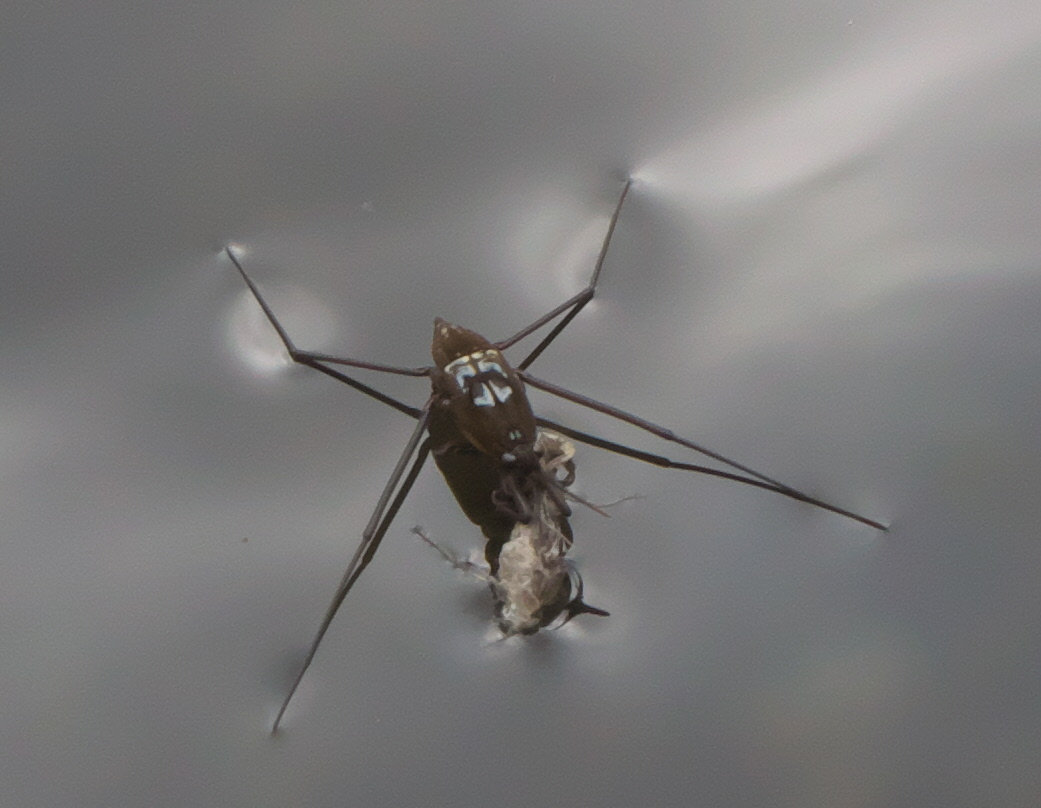
- Gerridae

Scientific classification
- Domain: Eukaryota
- Kingdom: Animalia
- Phylum: Arthropoda
- Class: Insecta
- Order: Hemiptera
- Suborder: Heteroptera
- Infraorder: Gerromorpha
- Superfamily: Gerroidea

= Gerroidea =

Superfamily of true bugs

Gerroidea is a superfamily of semiaquatic bugs in the order Hemiptera. There are at least 3 families and more than 2,000 described species in Gerroidea.

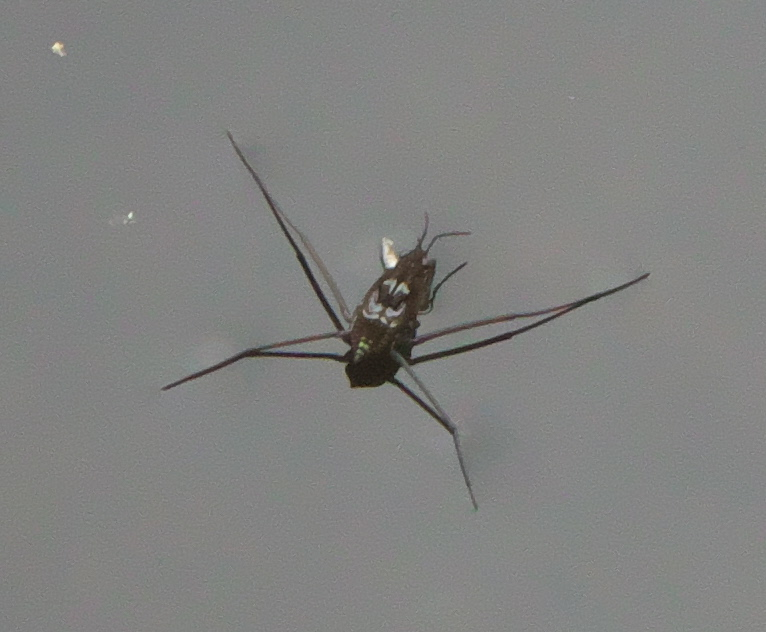
Gerridae

== Families ==
These three families belong to the superfamily Gerroidea:

- Gerridae Leach, 1815 (water striders)
- Hermatobatidae Coutière & Martin, 1901
- Veliidae Amyot & Serville, 1843 (smaller water striders or riffle bugs)
