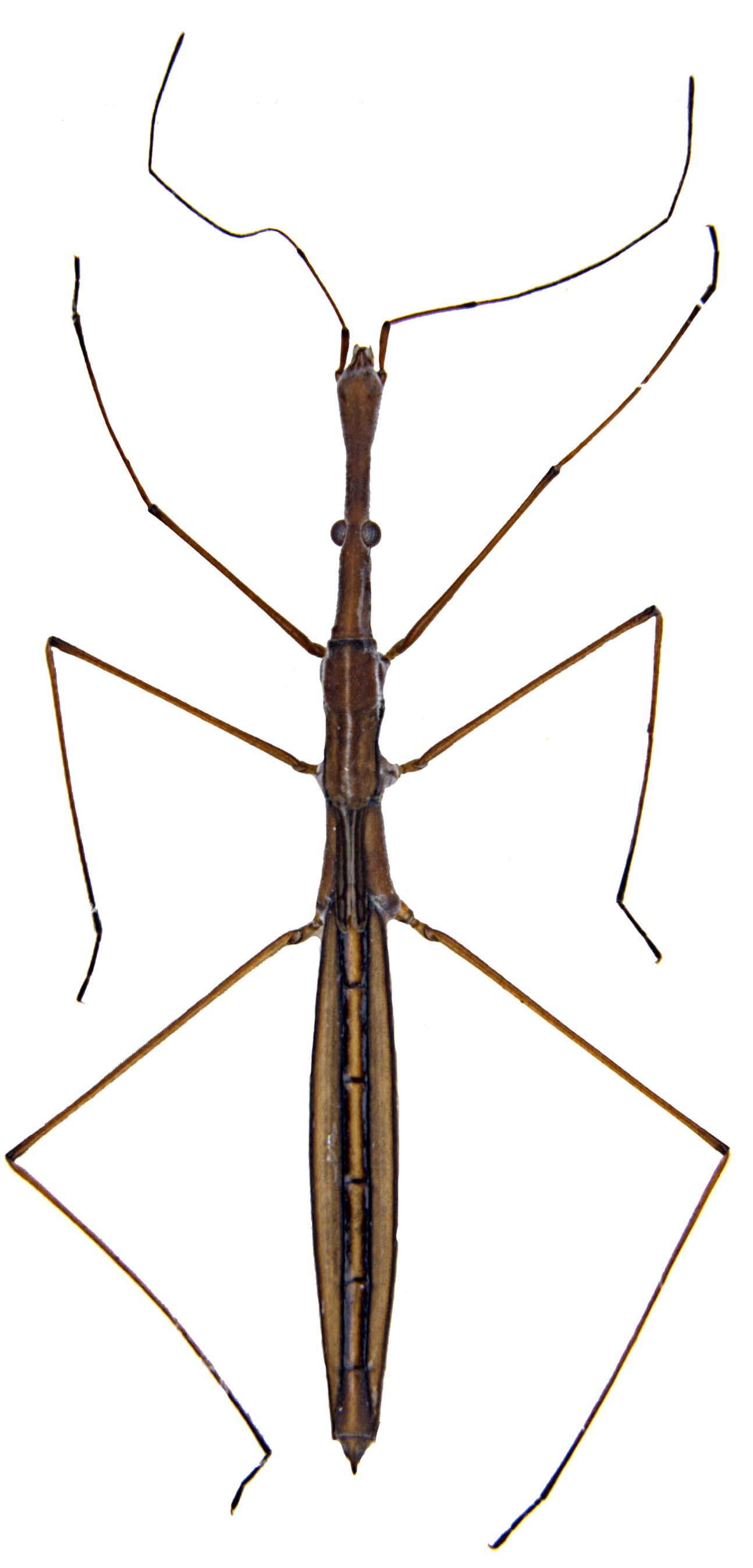

Scientific classification
- Domain: Eukaryota
- Kingdom: Animalia
- Phylum: Arthropoda
- Class: Insecta
- Order: Hemiptera
- Suborder: Heteroptera
- Family: Hydrometridae
- Genus: Hydrometra
- Species: H. gracilenta

Binomial name
- Hydrometra gracilenta Horváth, 1899

= Hydrometra gracilenta =

Species of true bug

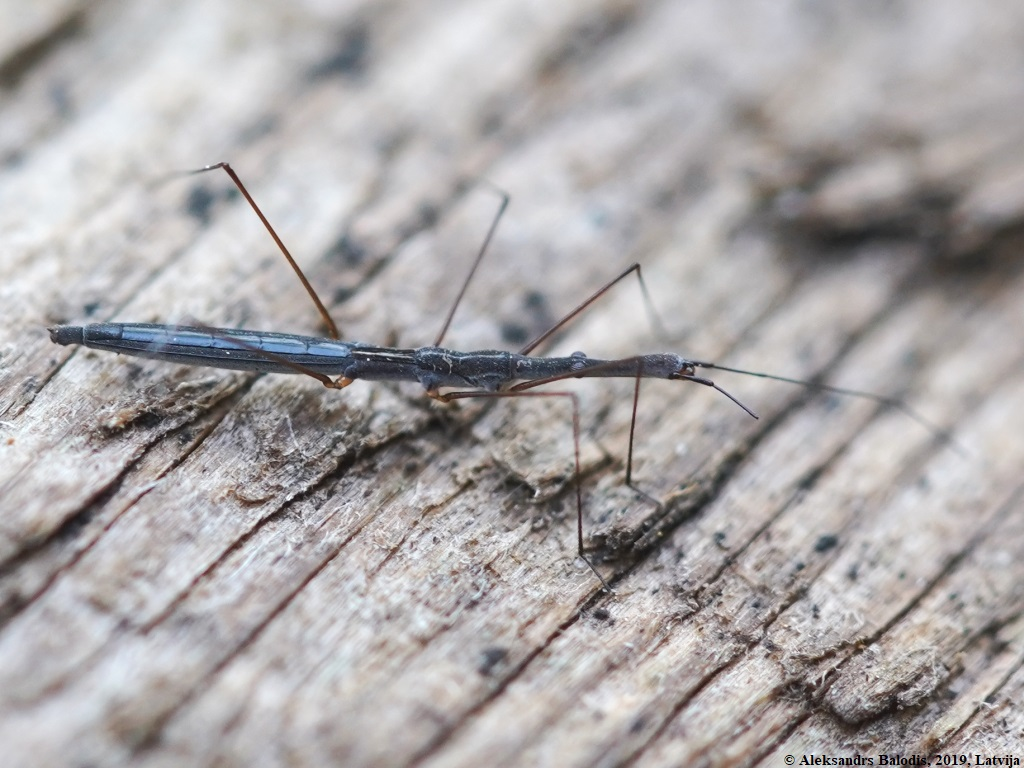
Hydrometra gracilenta on wood

Hydrometra gracilenta, the lesser water-measurer, is a species of aquatic bugs in the family Hydrometridae.

== Description ==
Hydrometra gracilenta is 7–9 mm (0.28–0.35 in) long, somewhat smaller than Hydrometra stagnorum; its eyes are located halfway down its head. Its specific name is from the Latin word for "slender."

== Habitat ==
This species lives in ponds in Northern Europe (including Great Britain and Ireland) and Italy. It is on the United Kingdom Biodiversity Action Plan (UKBAP) list, preferring well-vegetated ditches flooded, or surface wet fen (marsh) with dense vegetation.

== Behaviour ==
It is diurnal and eats other insects, including Chironomidae (non-biting midges). The female lays her eggs in May or June; they develop into nymphs and then become adults by July. The name "water measurer" refers to the insects' habit of walking on the surface of ditches and ponds, apparently pacing the distances between points. Hydrophobic hairs on its legs allow it to walk on the surface of the water.
