= Hydrometra martini =

Scientific classification
- Domain: Eukaryota
- Kingdom: Animalia
- Phylum: Arthropoda
- Class: Insecta
- Order: Hemiptera
- Suborder: Heteroptera
- Family: Hydrometridae
- Genus: Hydrometra
- Species: H. martini

Binomial name
- Hydrometra martini Kirkaldy, 1900

Species of true bug

Hydrometra martini is a species of water measurer in the family Hydrometridae. It is found in North America.
