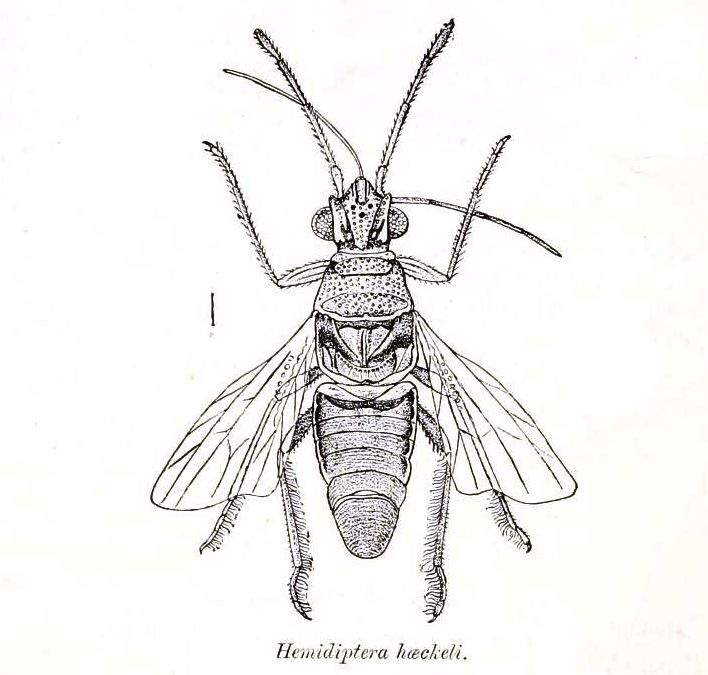
- Hemidiptera haeckeli

Scientific classification
- Domain: Eukaryota
- Kingdom: Animalia
- Phylum: Arthropoda
- Class: Insecta
- Order: Hemiptera
- Suborder: Heteroptera
- Family: Lygaeidae
- Genus: Hemidiptera; Leon, 1890
- Species: H. haeckeli

Binomial name
- Hemidiptera haeckeli Leon, 1890

= Hemidiptera =

Genus of true bugs

Hemidiptera is a monotypic genus of bug with a single species Hemidiptera haeckeli. It has wings that look somewhat like that of a fly (order Diptera) from which the genus name is derived. The original specimen was collected in Sri Lanka by Ernst Haeckel who brought it along with pond skaters and it was at first glance thought to be a fly because of its wings but the bug like rostrum or beak was also readily observable. Leon who described it thought it was a new order that was intermediate between the flies and the bugs. It was misclassified and thought to be similar to aquatic bugs in the Hydrometridae and the hairy legs were considered as adaptations for swimming. It is now placed within the subfamily Orsillinae but nothing is really known about the insect. It is suggested that the forewings of the type specimen may have been damaged since no new specimens of this have been found since the time of its description.
