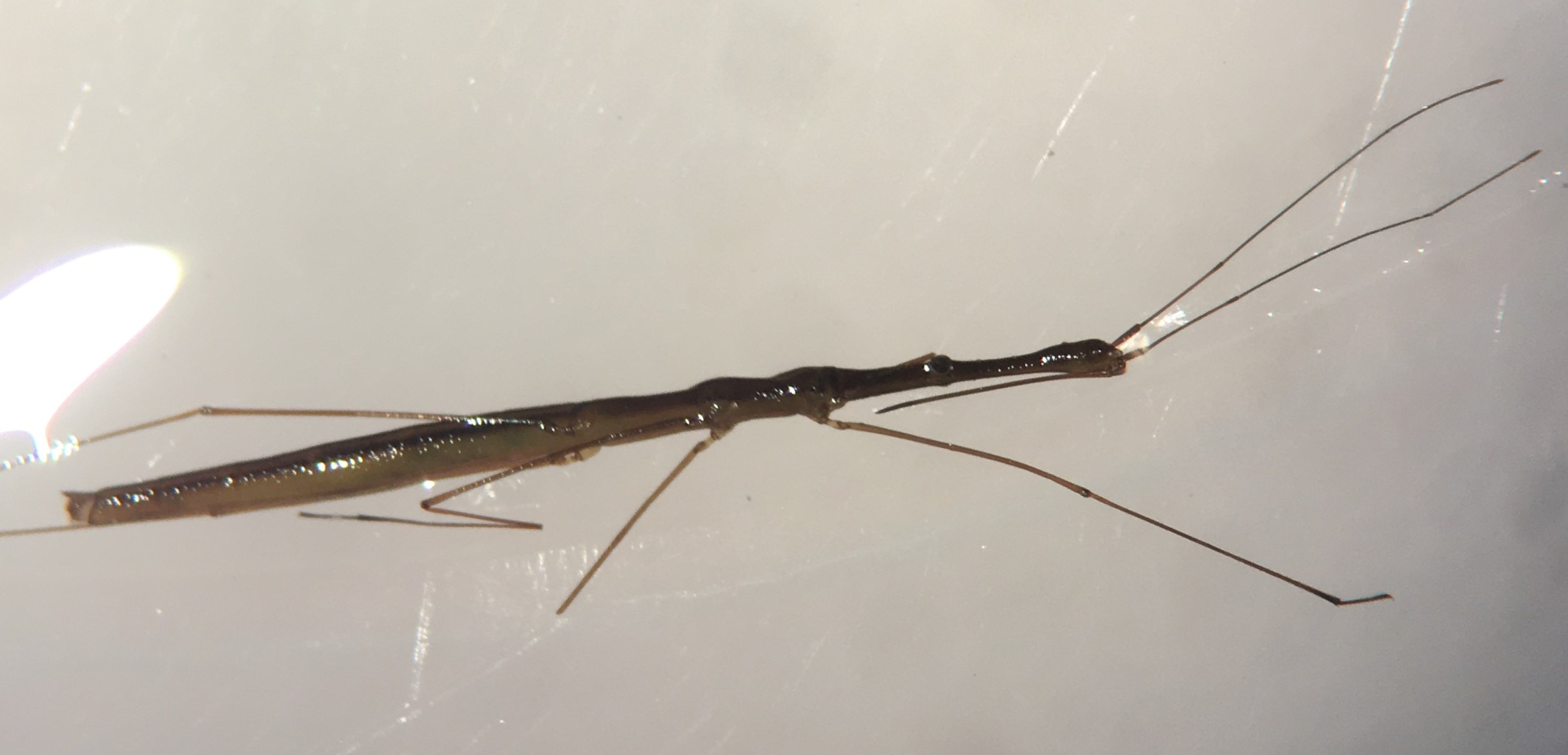

Scientific classification
- Domain: Eukaryota
- Kingdom: Animalia
- Phylum: Arthropoda
- Class: Insecta
- Order: Hemiptera
- Suborder: Heteroptera
- Family: Hydrometridae
- Genus: Hydrometra
- Species: H. australis

Binomial name
- Hydrometra australis Say, 1832

Synonyms
- Hydrometra myrae Torre-Bueno, 1926

= Hydrometra australis =

Species of true bug

Hydrometra australis is a species of water measurer in the family Hydrometridae. It is found in the Caribbean Sea, Central America, and North America.
