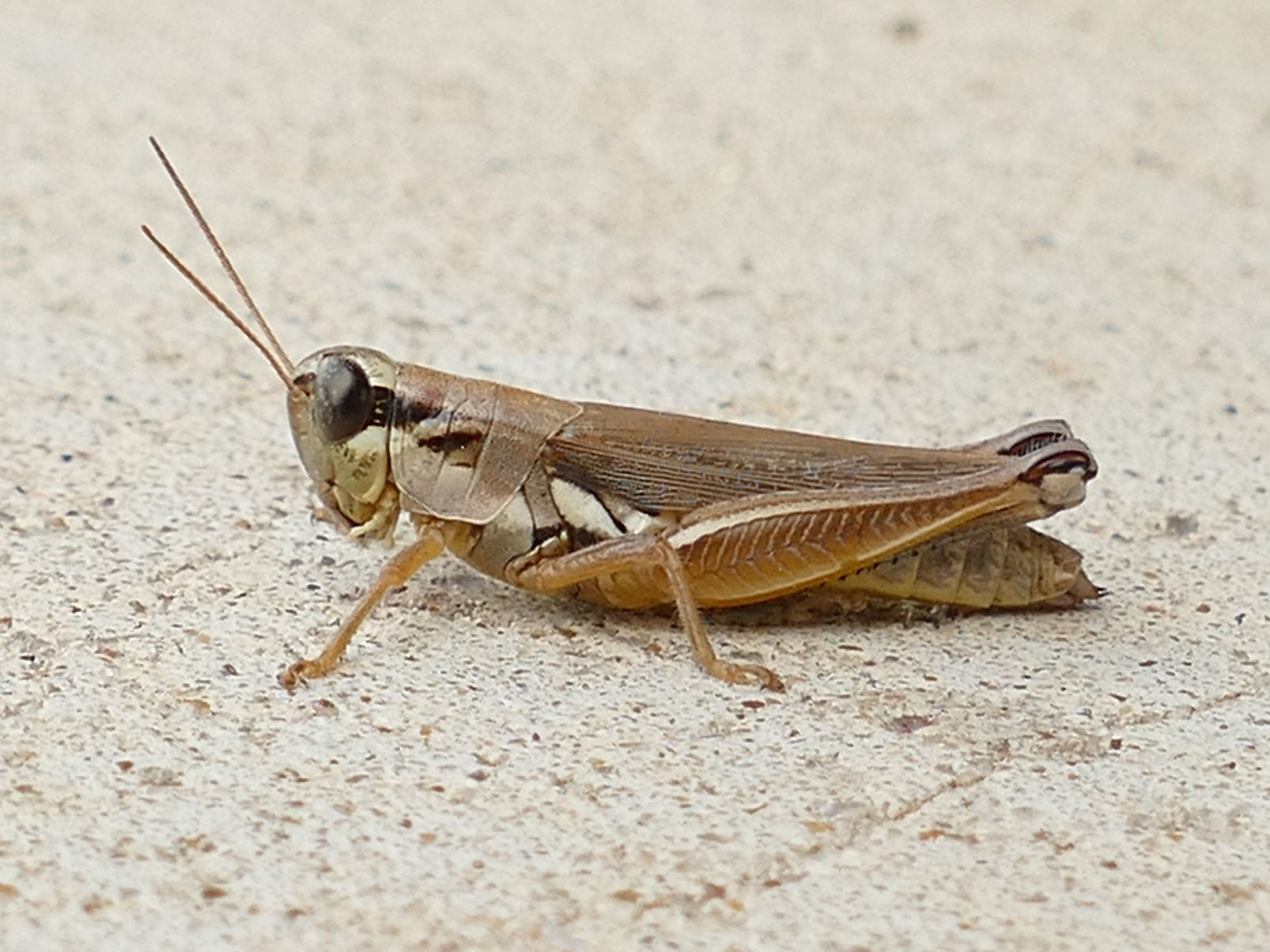

Scientific classification
- Domain: Eukaryota
- Kingdom: Animalia
- Phylum: Arthropoda
- Class: Insecta
- Order: Orthoptera
- Suborder: Caelifera
- Family: Acrididae
- Tribe: Melanoplini
- Genus: Paroxya
- Species: P. atlantica

Binomial name
- Paroxya atlantica Scudder, 1877

= Paroxya atlantica =

Species of grasshopper

Paroxya atlantica, known generally as the Atlantic grasshopper or Atlantic locust, is a species of spur-throated grasshopper in the family Acrididae. It is found in North America. It is semi-aquatic, often found on vegetation near the edges of slow-moving bodies of water.
