= Paraphrynovelia =

Scientific classification
- Domain: Eukaryota
- Kingdom: Animalia
- Phylum: Arthropoda
- Class: Insecta
- Order: Hemiptera
- Suborder: Heteroptera
- Infraorder: Gerromorpha
- Superfamily: Hydrometroidea
- Family: Paraphrynoveliidae; Andersen, 1978
- Genus: Paraphrynovelia; Poisson, 1955

Genus of insects

Paraphrynovelia is a genus of bugs with just two species in southern Africa. Together they are considered by some to form the family Paraphrynoveliidae, although some suggest that they should be treated as members of the Macroveliidae. Unlike other Gerromorpha that are found on the surface of water, Paraphrynovelia brincki specimens were found on wet walls covered in moss or in leaf litter on the forest floor. The family status was suggested in 1978.

The species in the genus are Paraphrynovelia brincki Poisson, 1957 and P. slateri Andersen, 1978. Both have been described on the basis of apterous adults. A molecular study making use of P. brincki suggests that they are a sister group of the Macroveliidae.
