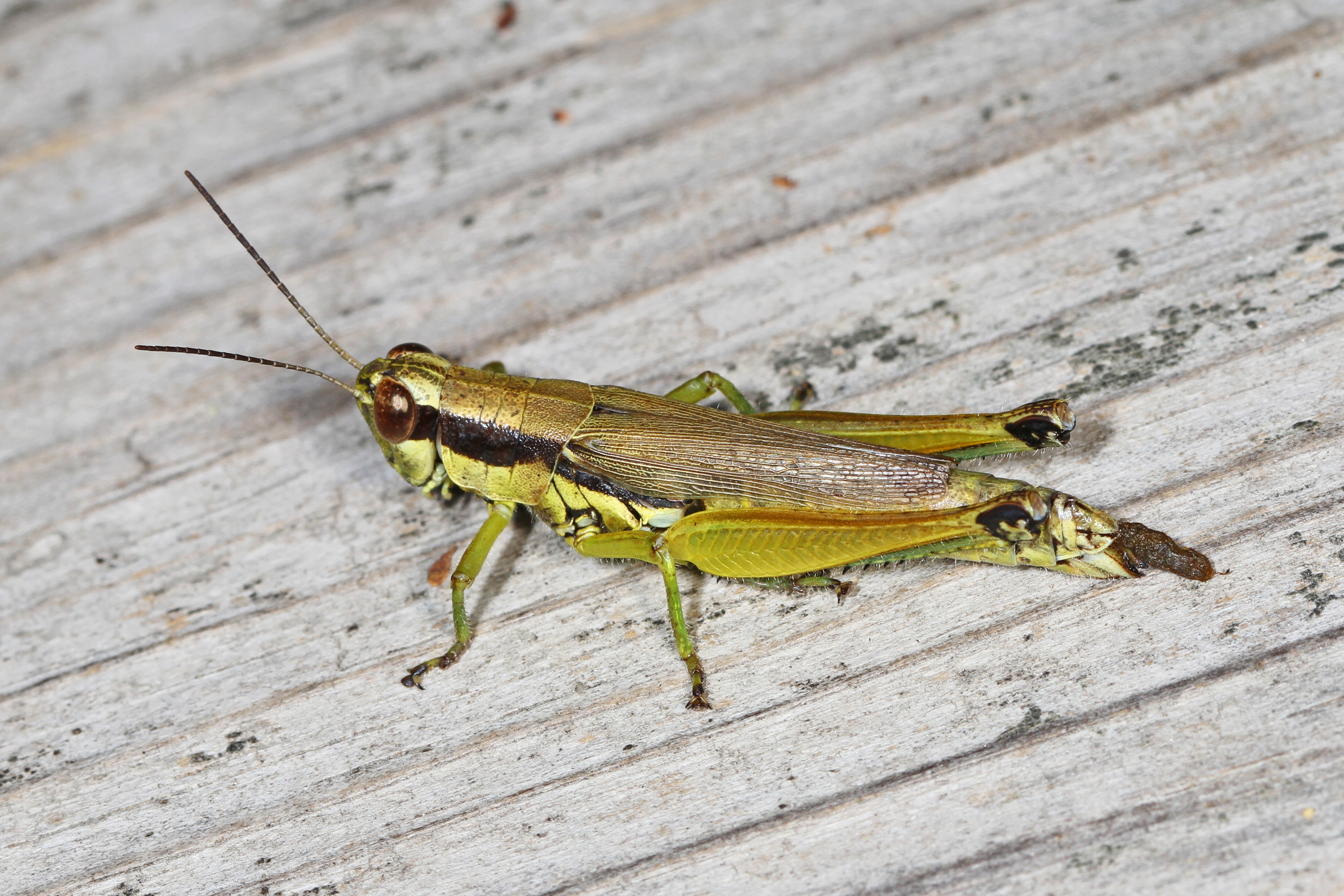
- Paroxya sp.

Scientific classification
- Kingdom: Animalia
- Phylum: Arthropoda
- Class: Insecta
- Order: Orthoptera
- Suborder: Caelifera
- Family: Acrididae
- Subfamily: Melanoplinae
- Tribe: Melanoplini
- Genus: Paroxya; Scudder, 1877

= Paroxya =

Genus of grasshoppers

Paroxya is a genus of spur-throated grasshoppers in the family Acrididae. There are about eight described species in the genus Paroxya.

== Species ==
These eight species belong to the genus Paroxya:

- Paroxya atlantica Scudder, 1877^{i c g b} (Atlantic grasshopper)
- Paroxya bermudensis Rehn, J.A.G., 1909^{c g}
- Paroxya clavuliger (Serville, 1839)^{i b} (olive-green swamp grasshopper)
- Paroxya clavuligera (Serville, 1838)^{c g}
- Paroxya dissimilis Morse, 1905^{c g}
- Paroxya hoosieri (Blatchley, 1892)^{i c g}
- Paroxya paroxyoides (Scudder, 1897)^{i c g}
- Paroxya recta Scudder, 1877^{i c g}

Data sources: i = ITIS, c = Catalogue of Life, g = GBIF, b = Bugguide.net
