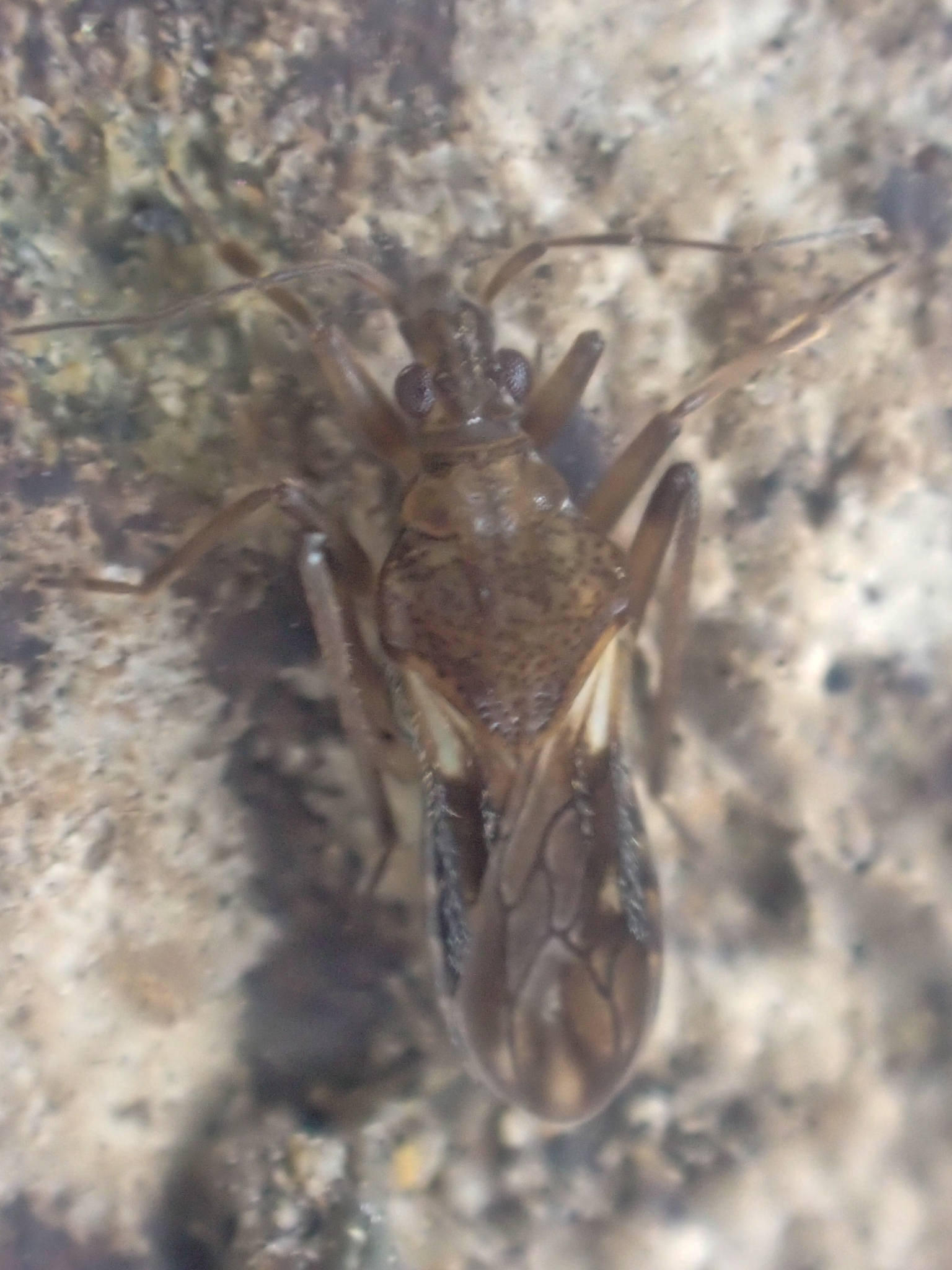

Scientific classification
- Domain: Eukaryota
- Kingdom: Animalia
- Phylum: Arthropoda
- Class: Insecta
- Order: Hemiptera
- Suborder: Heteroptera
- Family: Macroveliidae
- Genus: Macrovelia; Uhler, 1872
- Species: M. hornii

Binomial name
- Macrovelia hornii Uhler, 1872

= Macrovelia =

Genus of true bugs

Macrovelia is a genus of macroveliid shore bugs in the family Macroveliidae. There is one described species in Macrovelia, M. hornii. It prefers shaded areas and overwinters as an adult.
