= Semiaquatic =

Spends part of their time in water, or grows partially submerged in water

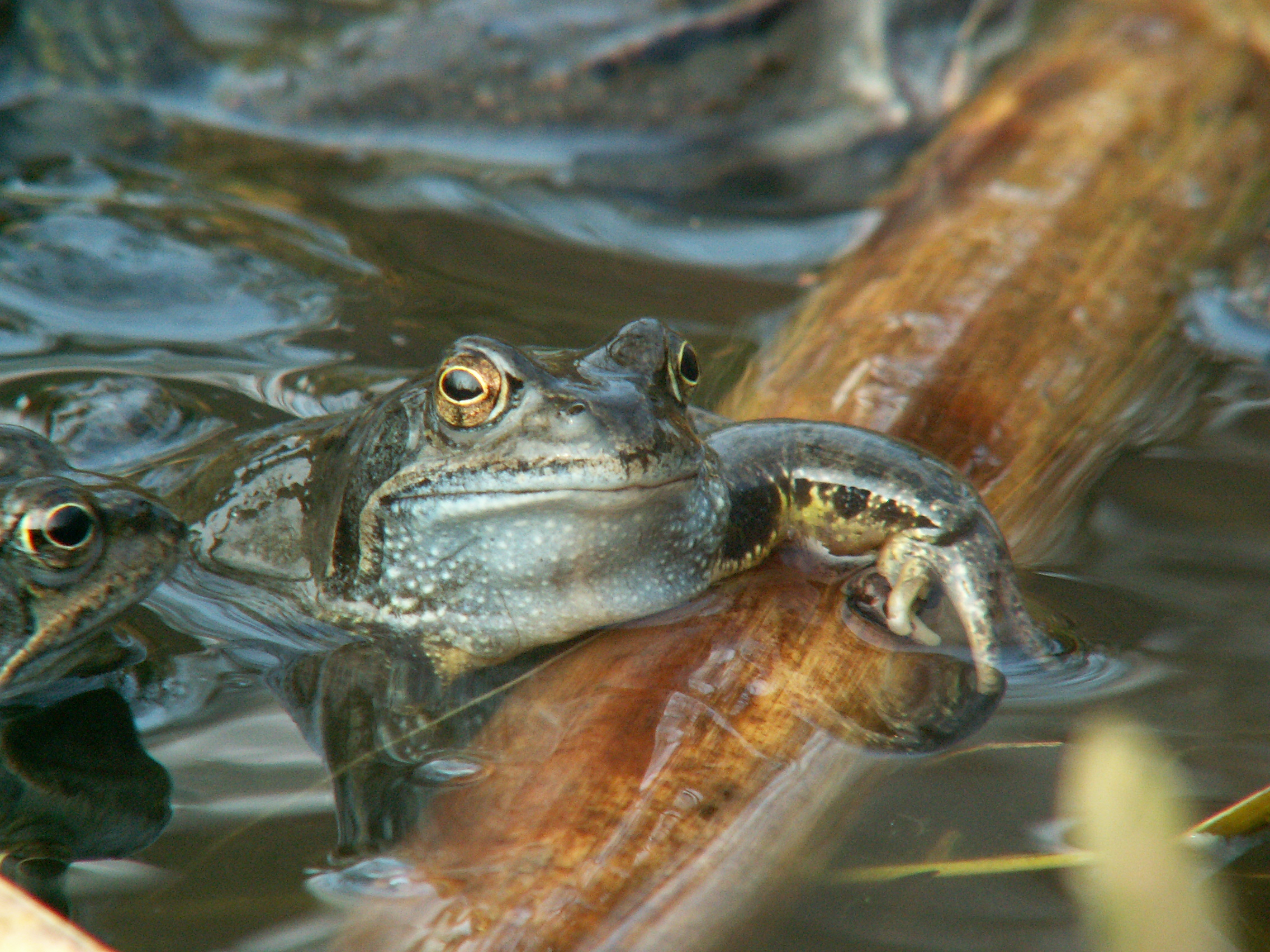
The common frog, one of the most ubiquitous semiaquatic amphibians in Europe

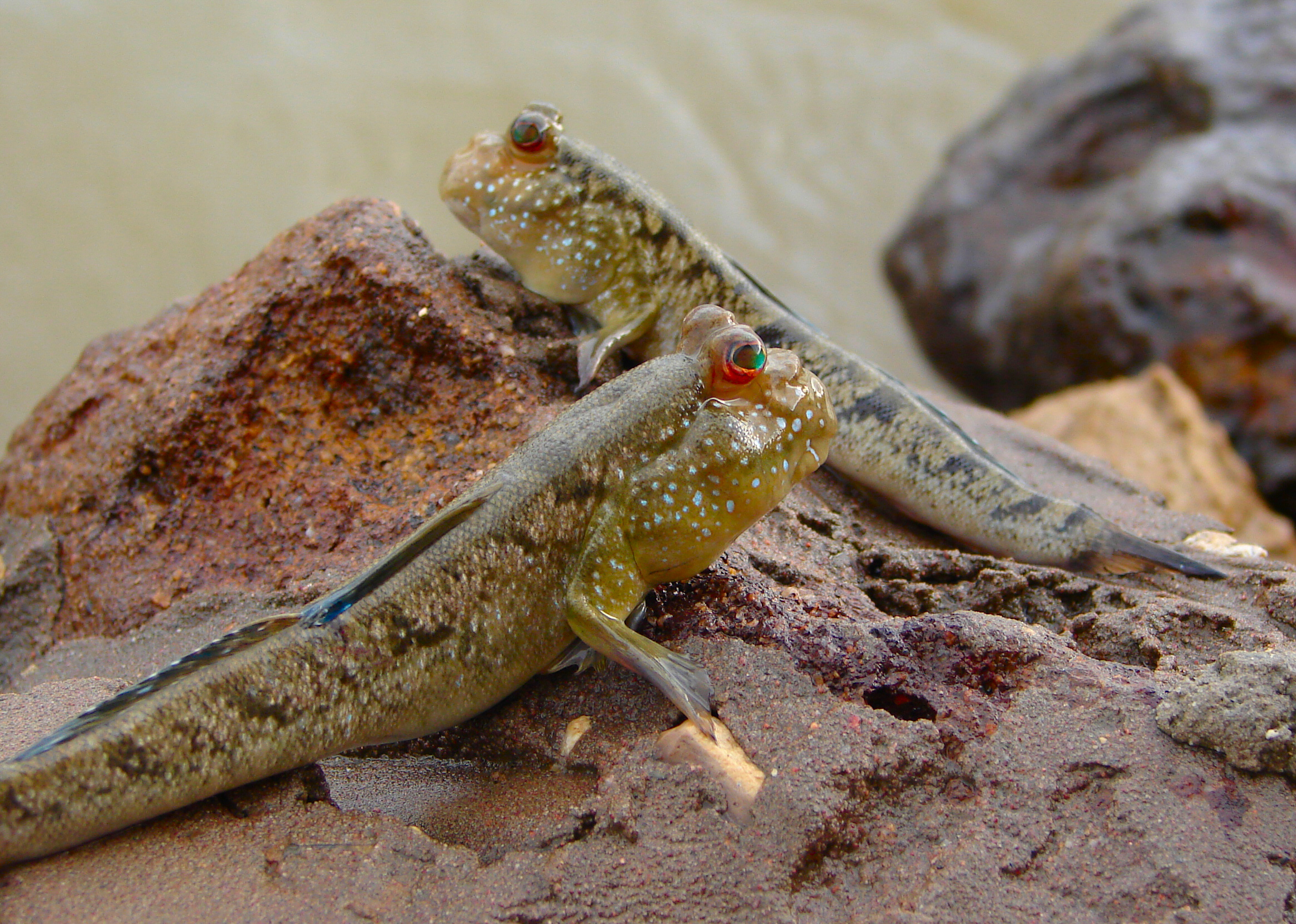
Atlantic mudskippers, amphibious fish of mangrove swamps and tidal flats

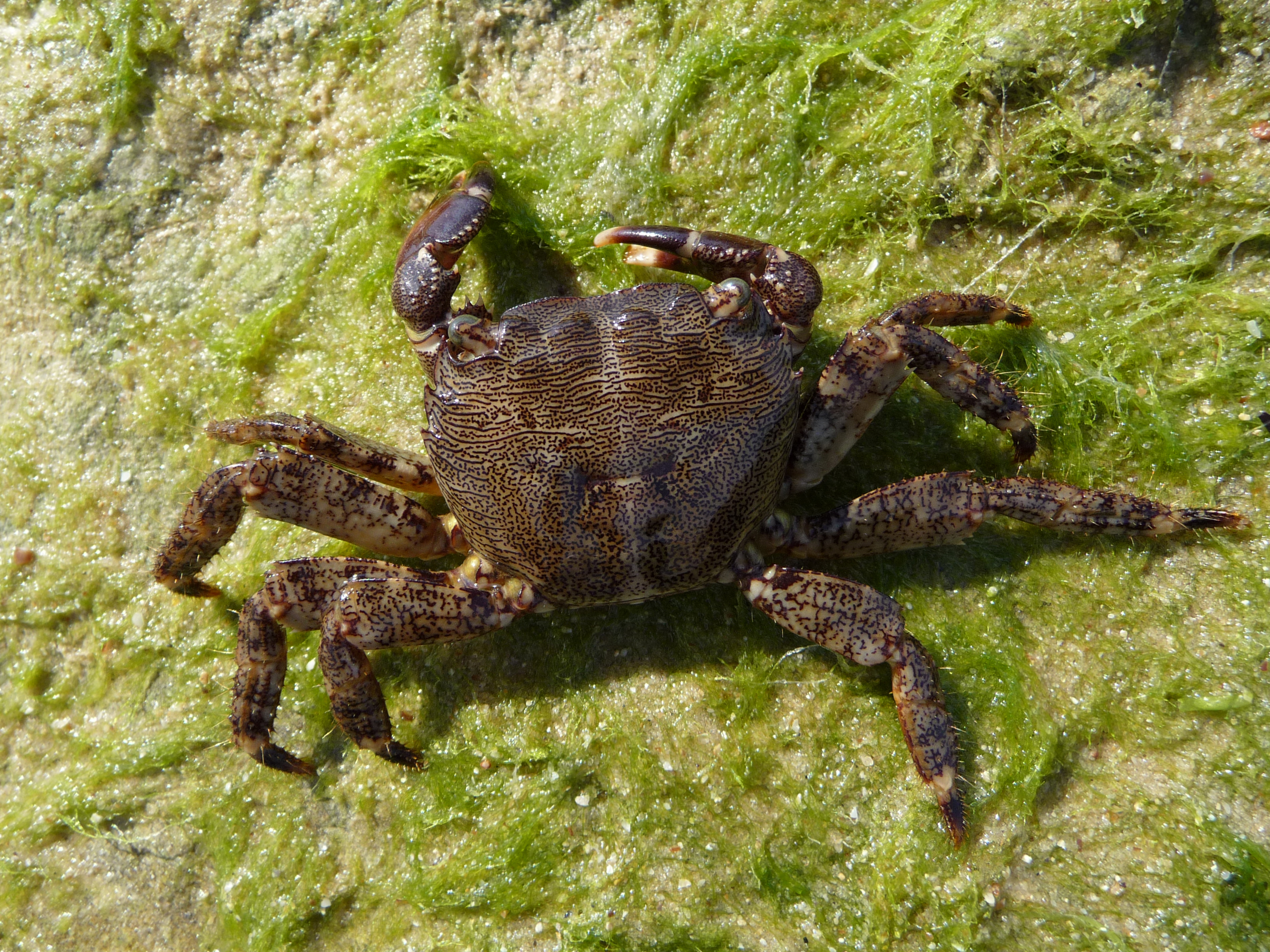
Pachygrapsus marmoratus, a semiterrestrial crab

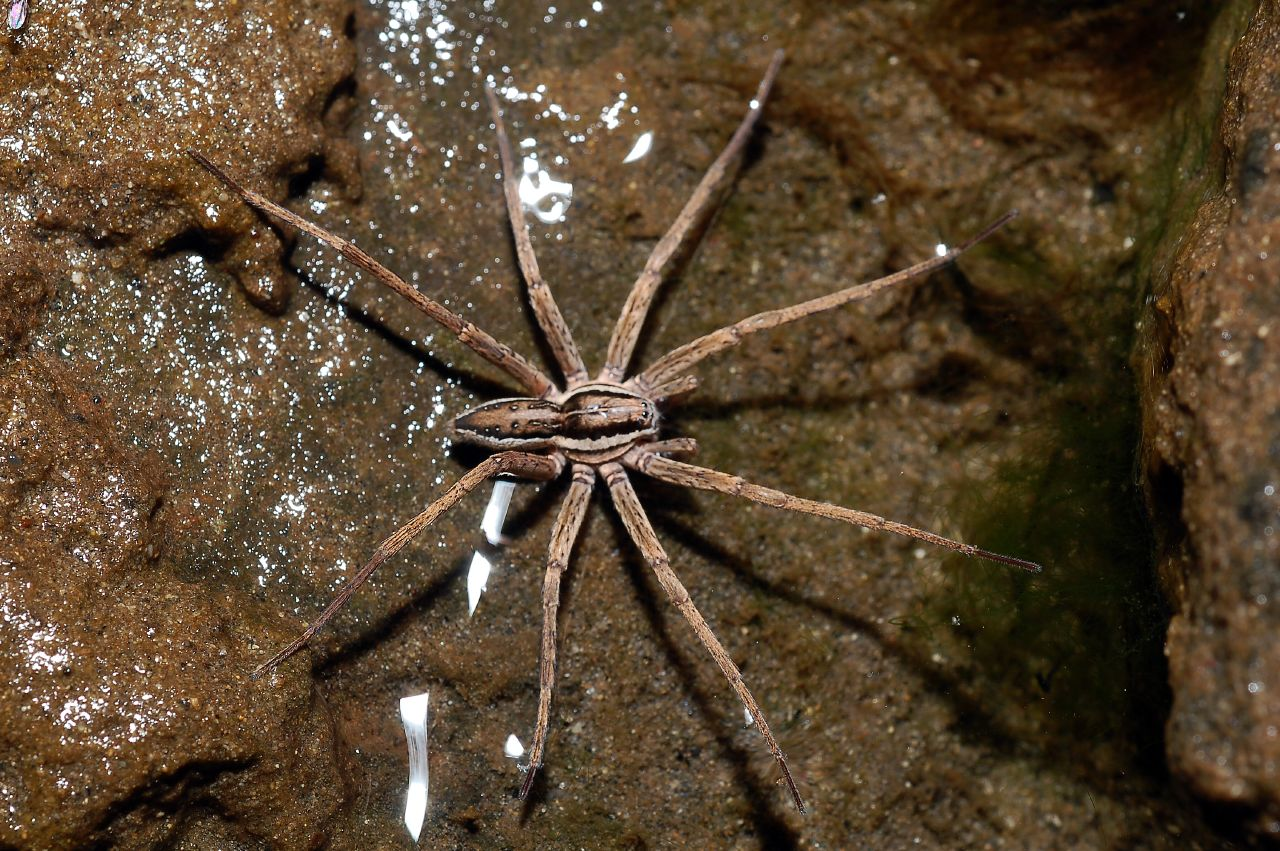
Hunting stance of Dolomedes minor, a semiaquatic spider

In biology, being semiaquatic refers to various macro-organisms that live regularly in both aquatic and terrestrial environments. When referring to animals, the term describes those that actively spend part of their daily time in water (in which case they can also be called amphibious), or land animals that have spent at least one life stage (e.g. as eggs or larvae) in aquatic environments. When referring to plants, the term describes land plants whose roots have adapted well to tolerate regular, prolonged submersion in water, as well as emergent and (occasionally) floating-leaved aquatic plants that are only partially immersed in water.

Examples of semiaquatic animals and plants are given below.

== Semiaquatic animals ==
Semiaquatic animals include:

- Vertebrates
  - Amphibious fish; also several types of normally fully aquatic fish such as the grunion and plainfin midshipman that spawn in the intertidal zone
  - Some amphibians such as newts and salamanders, and some frogs such as fire-bellied toads and wood frogs.
  - Some reptiles such as crocodilians, turtles, water snakes and marine iguanas.
  - Waterbirds, especially penguins, waterfowls, storks and shorebirds.
  - Some rodents such as beavers, muskrats and capybaras.
  - Some insectivorous mammals such as desmans, water shrews and platypuses.
  - Some carnivoran mammals, including seals, otters and polar bears.
  - Some marsupials, including the water opossum and the two lutrine opossums.
  - Hippos.
  - Indian rhinoceros.
  - Water buffalo.
  - Tapirs.
  - Moose.
- Semiterrestrial echinoderms of the intertidal zone, such as the "cliff-clinging" sea urchin Colobocentrotus atratus and the starfish Pisaster ochraceus
- Arthropods
  - Aquatic insects (e.g., dragonflies) with at least one non-aquatic life stage (e.g., adults), or amphibious insects (e.g., amphibious caterpillars or the ant Polyrhachis sokolova). (Note: At least one individual of a normally fully terrestrial praying mantis species, Hierodula tenuidentata, has learned to opportunistically prey on fish.) Members of the hemipteran infraorders Gerromorpha and Nepomorpha occupy a variety of semiaquatic and aquatic niches, with many of the former locomoting on the water surface; a few of these are marine (e.g., Halobates, Hermatobates).
  - Semiaquatic springtails, such as Anurida maritima
  - Semiterrestrial malacostracan crustaceans (e.g., many crabs, such as Pachygrapsus marmoratus, (Note: Technically, most land crabs fall into this category, since most must return to bodies of water to release their eggs; the few exceptions, such as members of genus Geosesarma, are found among the Grapsidae (sensu lato) and Potamoidea (sensu lato).) some amphipods, such as Orchestia gammarellus, some isopods, such as Ligia oceanica and some barnacles, such as Balanus glandula)
  - Horseshoe crabs are mostly aquatic but spawn in the intertidal zone; juveniles live in tidal flats
  - Semiaquatic spiders, such as Ancylometes or Dolomedes (these are distinct from the almost fully aquatic Argyroneta)
  - Amphibious centipedes, such as Scolopendra cataracta and relatives
- Semiaquatic annelids, such as the earthworm Sparganophilus or the Namanereidine bristleworms
- Molluscs
  - Intertidal bivalves, such as Enigmonia, which lives on mangroves
  - Intertidal chitons, such as Acanthopleura granulata
  - Semiterrestrial gastropods, such as the intertidal Patella vulgata, a limpet; also amphibious freshwater and marine snails, such as Pomatiopsis or Cerithideopsis scalariformis, respectively
- Semiterrestrial flatworms of the intertidal zone, such as the acotylean Myoramyxa pardalota

== Semiaquatic plants ==
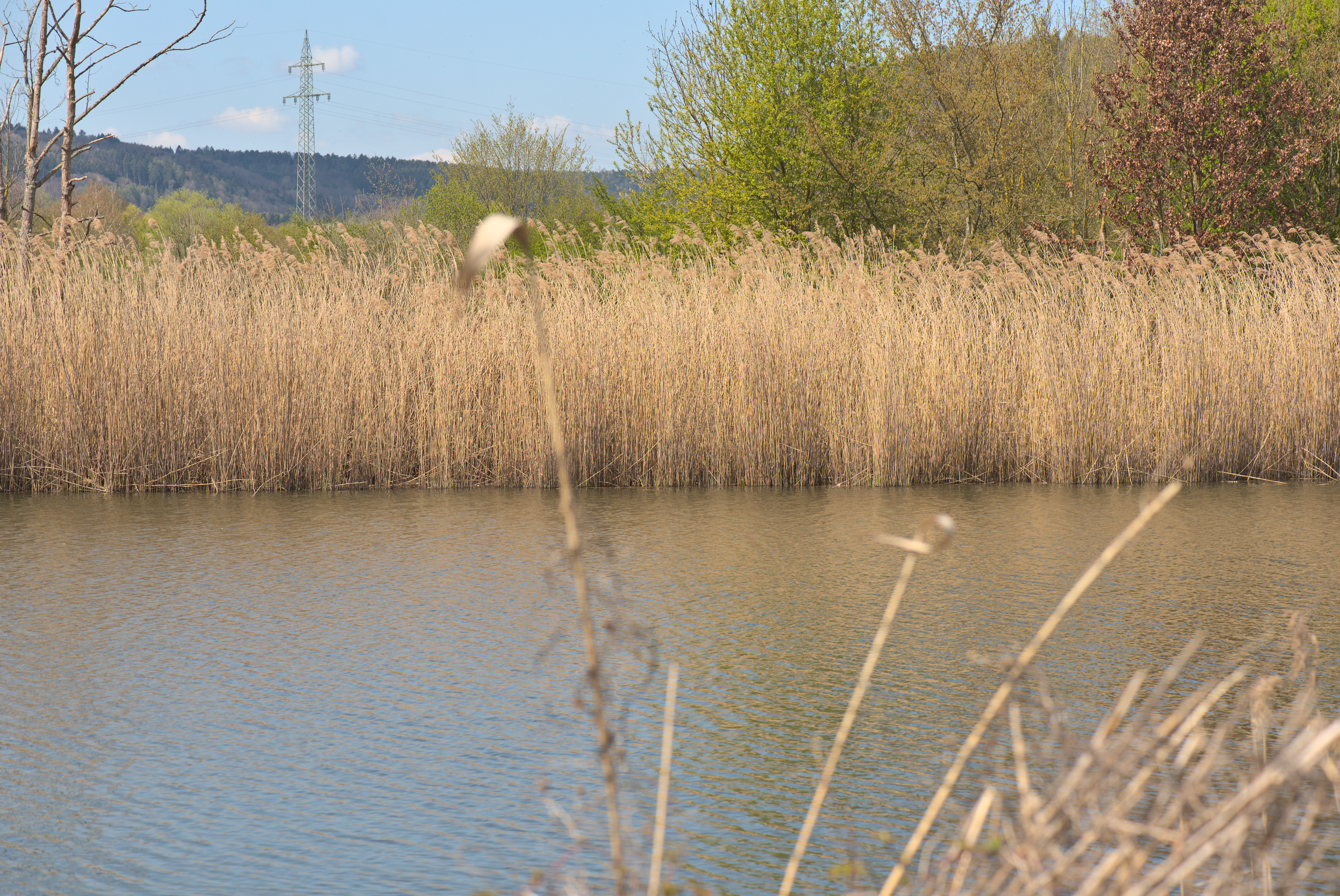
The common reed, a ubiquitous semiaquatic angiosperm of the grass family

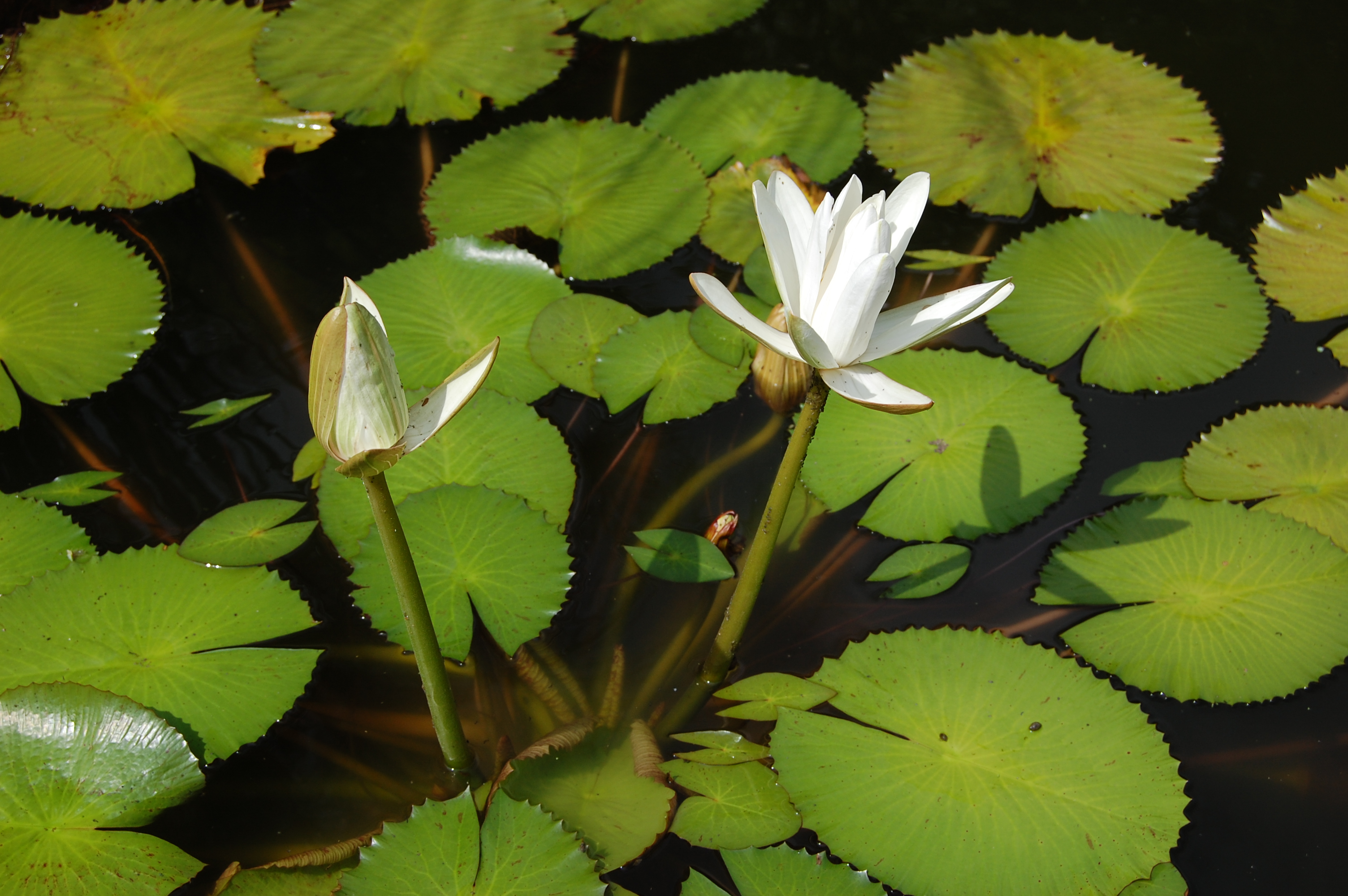
The white Egyptian lotus

Semiaquatic plants include:

- Semiaquatic angiosperms (e.g., mangroves, reeds, water spinach and the entire order Nymphaeales)
- Semiaquatic conifers, such as pond cypress
- Semi aquatic ferns, such as Pilularia americana
- A semiaquatic horsetail, Equisetum fluviatile
- Semiaquatic quillworts, such as Isoetes melanospora
- Semiaquatic club mosses, such as Lycopodiella inundata
- Semiaquatic mosses, such as Sphagnum macrophyllum
- Semiaquatic liverworts, such as Riccia fluitans
