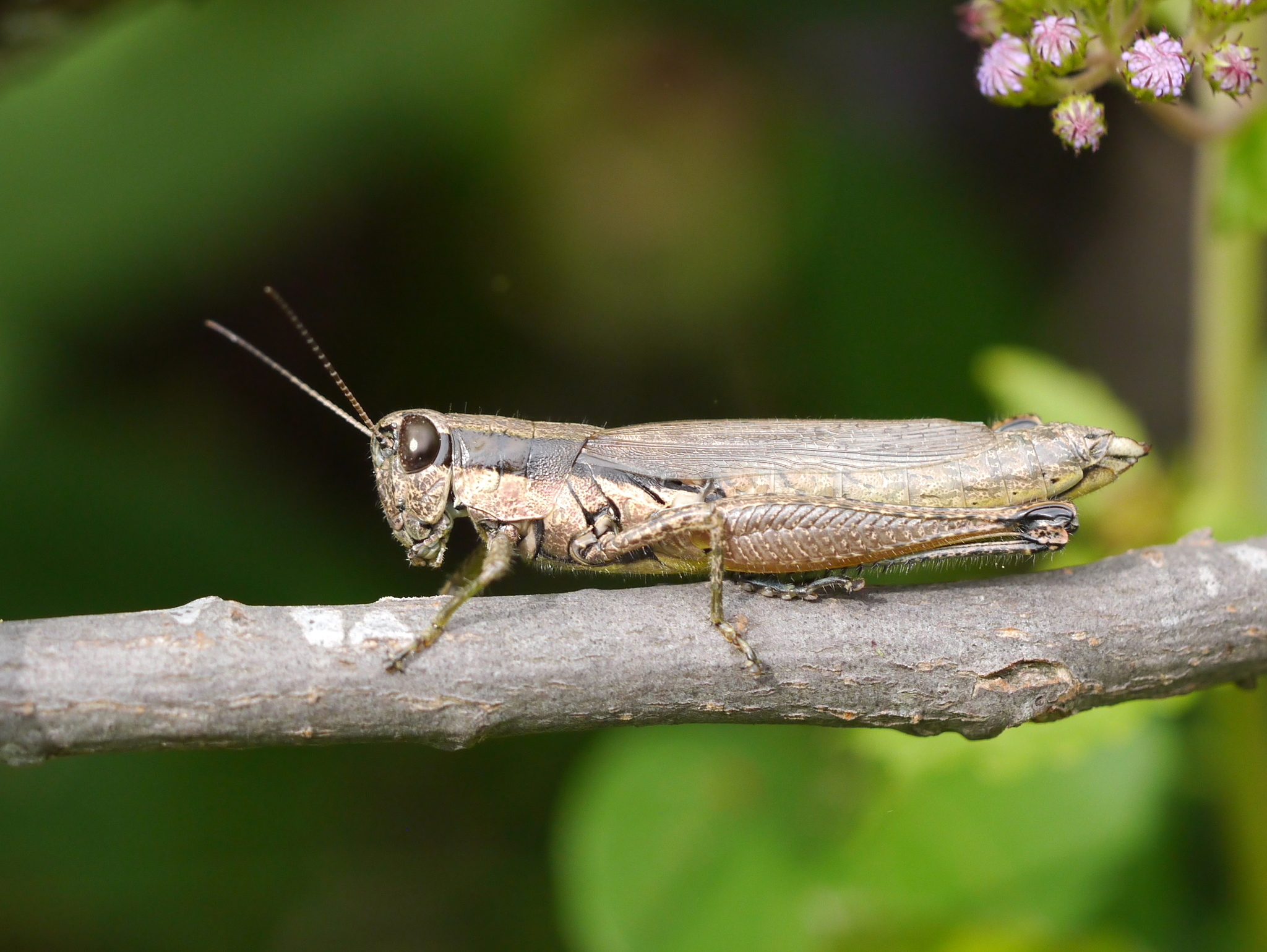
- In Virginia, US

Scientific classification
- Domain: Eukaryota
- Kingdom: Animalia
- Phylum: Arthropoda
- Class: Insecta
- Order: Orthoptera
- Suborder: Caelifera
- Family: Acrididae
- Subfamily: Melanoplinae
- Tribe: Melanoplini
- Genus: Paroxya
- Species: P. clavuligera

Binomial name
- Paroxya clavuligera (Serville, 1838)

= Paroxya clavuligera =

Species of spur-throated grasshopper

Paroxya clavuligera, the olive-green swamp grasshopper, is a species of spur-throated grasshopper in the family Acrididae. It is found in the southern and eastern United States.
