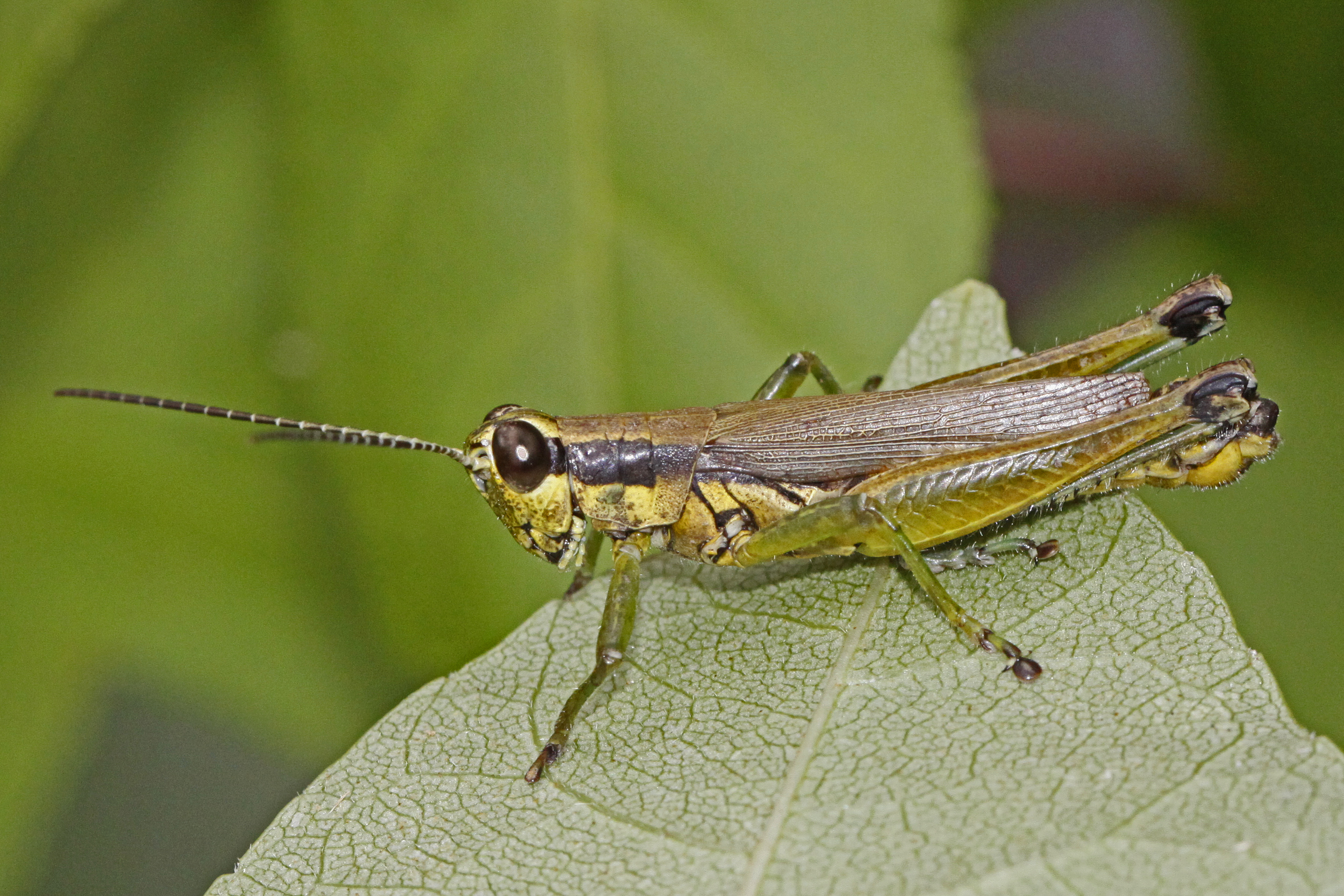

Scientific classification
- Domain: Eukaryota
- Kingdom: Animalia
- Phylum: Arthropoda
- Class: Insecta
- Order: Orthoptera
- Suborder: Caelifera
- Family: Acrididae
- Genus: Paroxya
- Species: P. clavuliger

Binomial name
- Paroxya clavuliger (Serville, 1839)

= Paroxya clavuliger =

Species of grasshopper

Paroxya clavuliger, known generally as the olive-green swamp grasshopper or olive-green swamp locust, is a species of spur-throated grasshopper in the family Acrididae. It is found in North America.

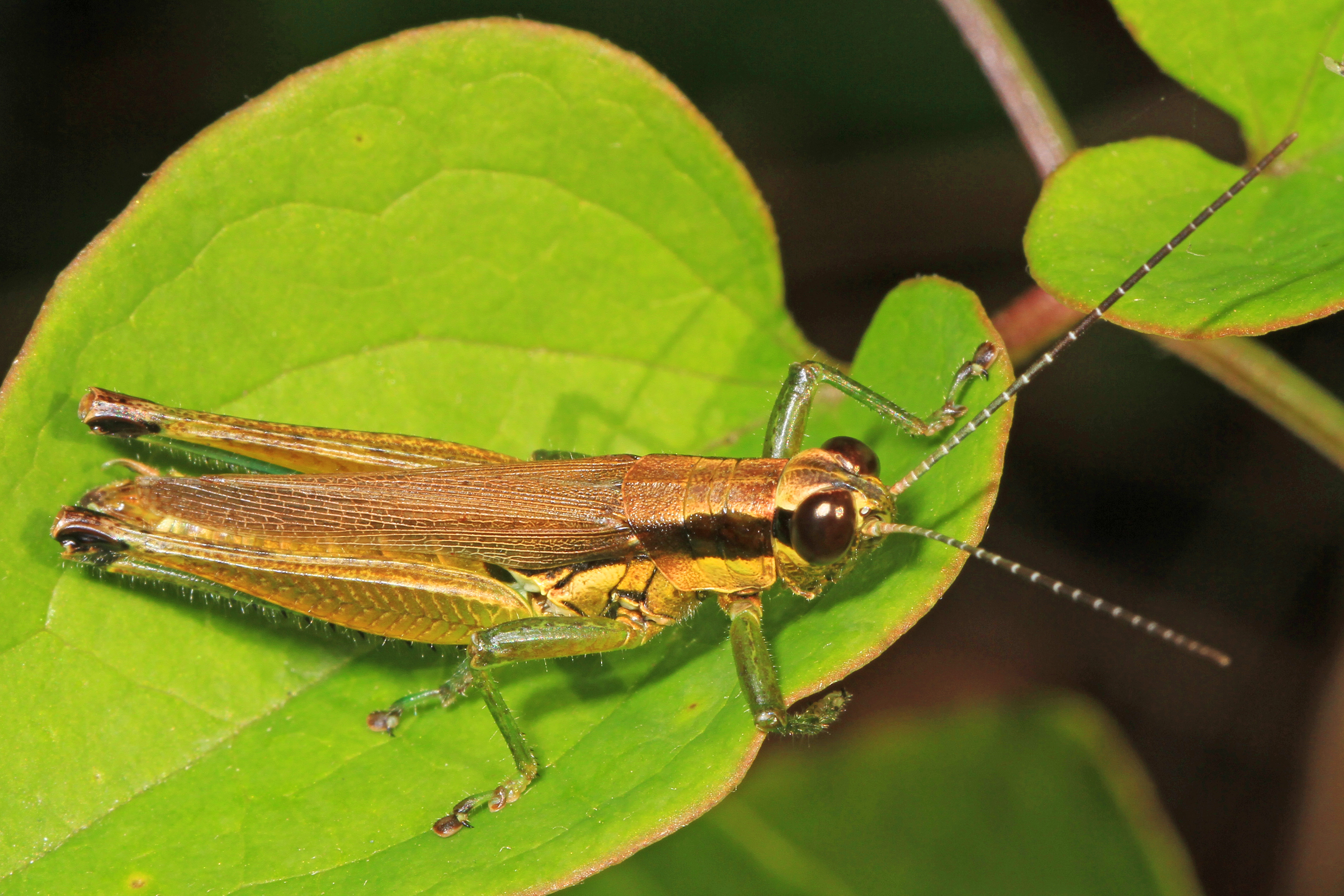
Olive-green swamp grasshopper, Paroxya clavuliger

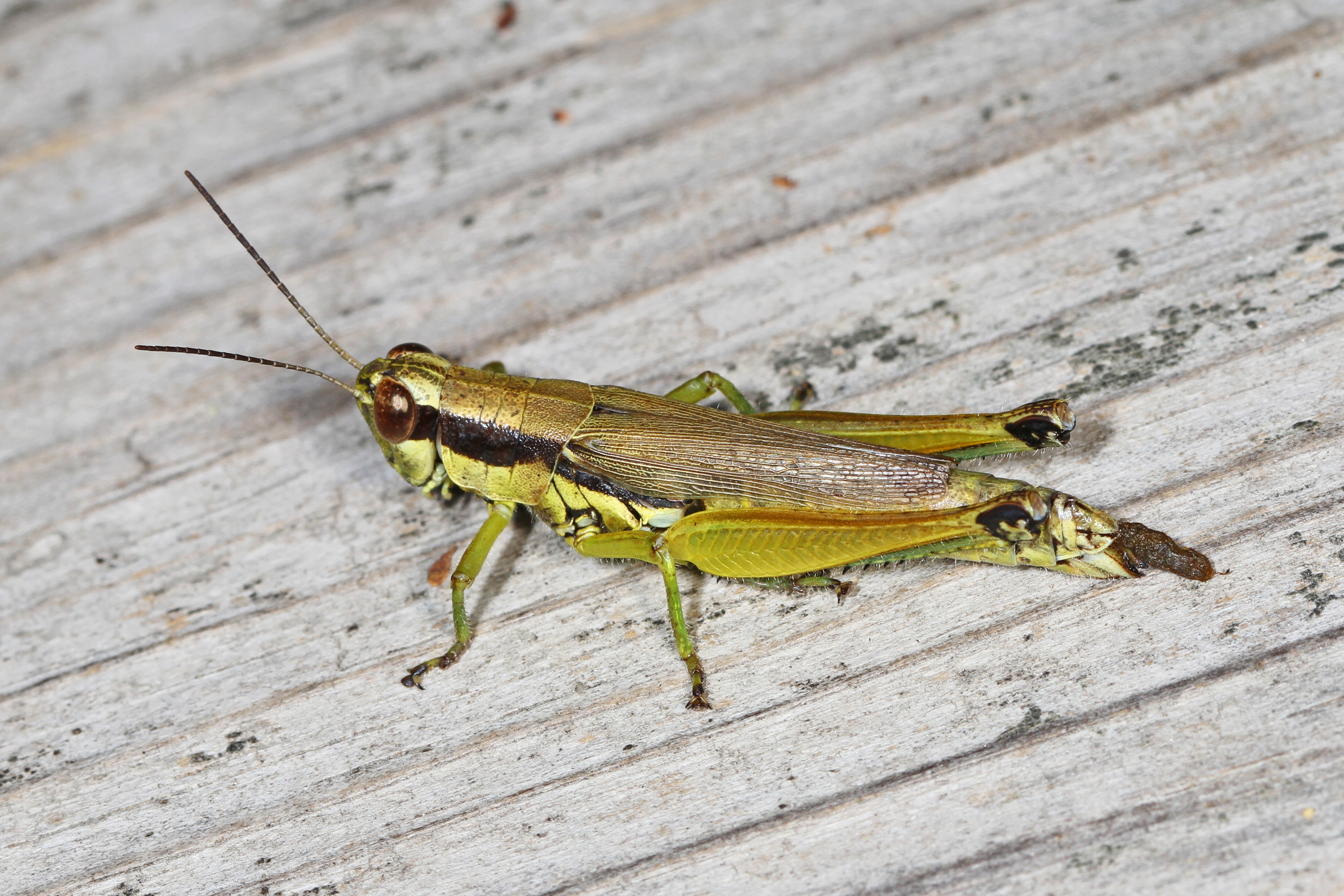
Olive-green swamp grasshopper, Paroxya clavuliger
