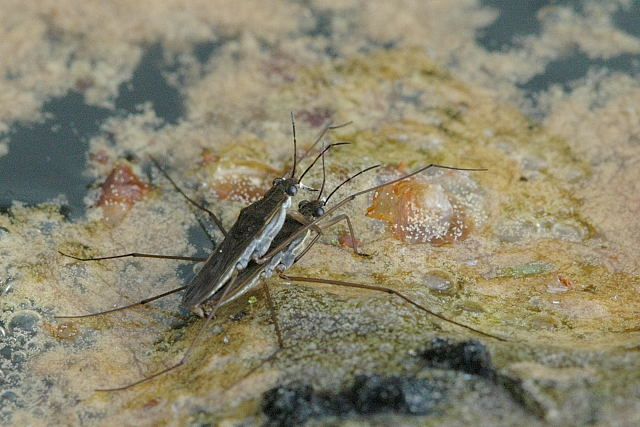
- A pair of common water striders (Gerris lacustris) copulating

Scientific classification
- Kingdom: Animalia
- Phylum: Arthropoda
- Clade: Pancrustacea
- Class: Insecta
- Order: Hemiptera
- Suborder: Heteroptera
- Infraorder: Gerromorpha; Popov, 1971

Superfamilies
- Gerroidea; Hebroidea; Hydrometroidea; Mesovelioidea

= Gerromorpha =

Gerromorpha Temporal range: Kimmeridgian–Holocene

Infraorder of true bugs

The Gerromorpha comprise an infraorder of insects in the "true bug" order Hemiptera. These "typical" bugs (suborder Heteroptera) are commonly called semiaquatic bugs or shore-inhabiting bugs. The Ochteroidea (infraorder Nepomorpha are also found in shore habitat, while the Gerromorpha are actually most often encountered running around on the water surface, being kept from sinking by surface tension and their water-repellent legs. Well-known members of the Gerromorpha are the namesake Gerridae (water striders).

== Systematics ==
The eight family families usually recognized are arranged in four superfamilies. The two small or monotypic ones of these are basal lineages; the two larger ones form a more advanced clade. The phylogenetic sequence of superfamilies and families of the Gerromorpha is:

Mesovelioidea – water treaders

- Madeoveliidae (sometimes included in Mesoveliidae)
- Mesoveliidae

=== Hebroidea ===
- Hebridae – velvet bugs
- Macroveliidae

=== Hydrometroidea ===
- Paraphrynoveliidae
- Hydrometridae – water measurers

=== Gerroidea ===
- Hermatobatidae
- Gerridae – water striders
- Veliidae – riffle bugs
