= Macroveliidae =

Scientific classification
- Domain: Eukaryota
- Kingdom: Animalia
- Phylum: Arthropoda
- Class: Insecta
- Order: Hemiptera
- Suborder: Heteroptera
- Infraorder: Gerromorpha
- Superfamily: Hebroidea
- Family: Macroveliidae; McKinstry, 1942

Family of true bugs

Macroveliidae is a family of macroveliid shore bugs in the order Hemiptera. There are at least four genera in Macroveliidae.

== Genera ==
These four genera belong to the family Macroveliidae:

- Chepuvelia China, 1963
- Macrovelia Uhler, 1872
- Oravelia Drake & Chapman, 1963
- † Daniavelia Andersen, 1998
