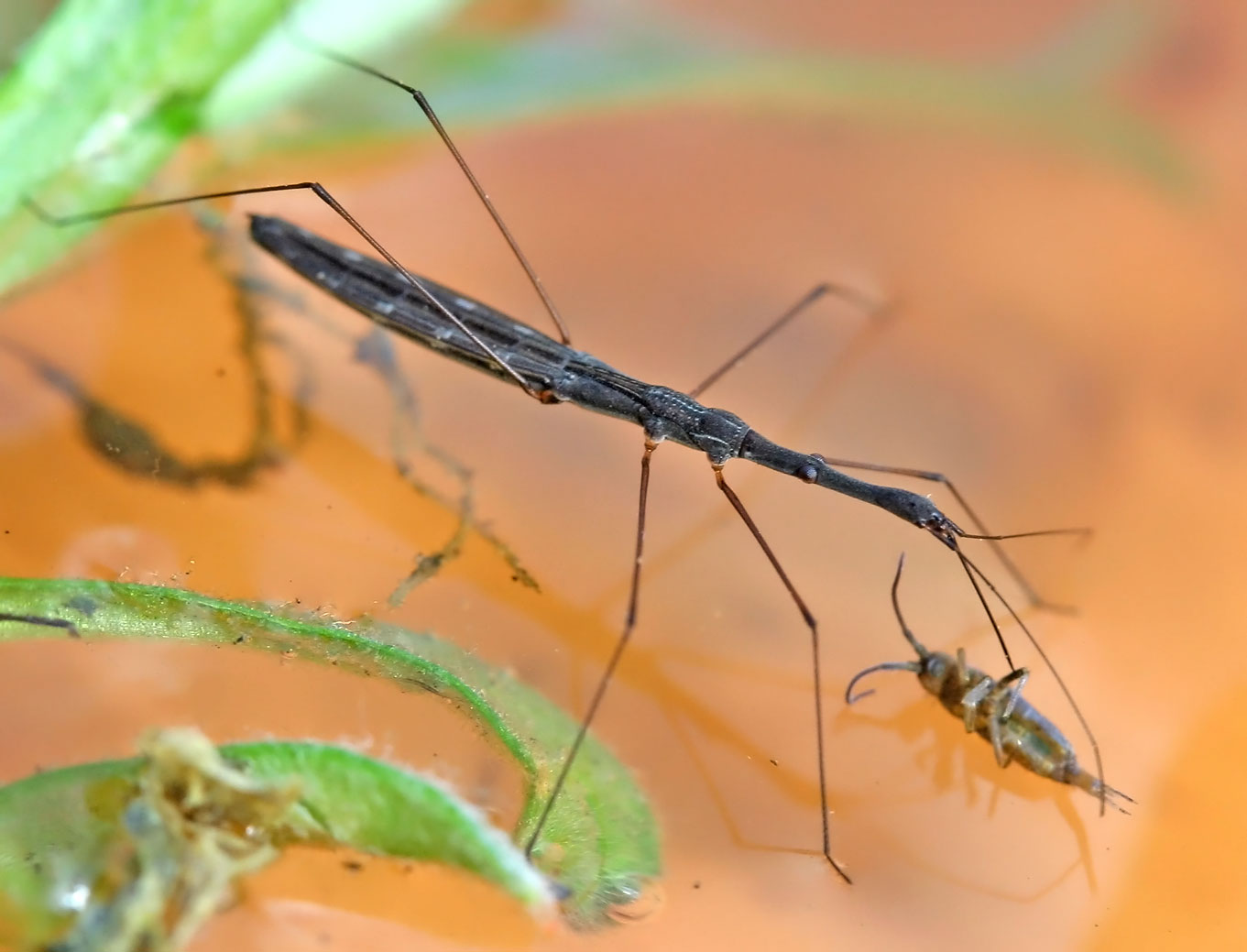

Scientific classification
- Kingdom: Animalia
- Phylum: Arthropoda
- Clade: Pancrustacea
- Class: Insecta
- Order: Hemiptera
- Suborder: Heteroptera
- Family: Hydrometridae
- Genus: Hydrometra
- Species: H. stagnorum

Binomial name
- Hydrometra stagnorum (Linnaeus, 1758)

= Hydrometra stagnorum =

Species of true bug

Hydrometra stagnorum searching of prey

Hydrometra stagnorum, the common water-measurer, is a species of aquatic bugs in the family Hydrometridae, the water measurers.

== Distribution ==
This species is found in numerous European countries, including Hungary and Austria. In Great Britain it is quite common in Leicestershire and Rutland.

== Description ==
Hydrometra stagnorum is normally wingless, but sometimes has full wings. It is often dark greyish or even black in colour, and grows to approximately 13mm. The head and body are long and thin. Its antennae appear similar to a fourth pair of legs.

== Habitat ==
This species lives at the vegetated margins in slow moving streams, as well as ditches and ponds. It lives close to the emergent stems of plants, upon which it lays its eggs.

== Behaviour ==
As adults, rows slowly over the surface of the water in search of prey. It seeks mosquito larvae and water fleas directly below the surface film. It catches these by spearing them through the surface of the water.

This species can jump if disturbed.
