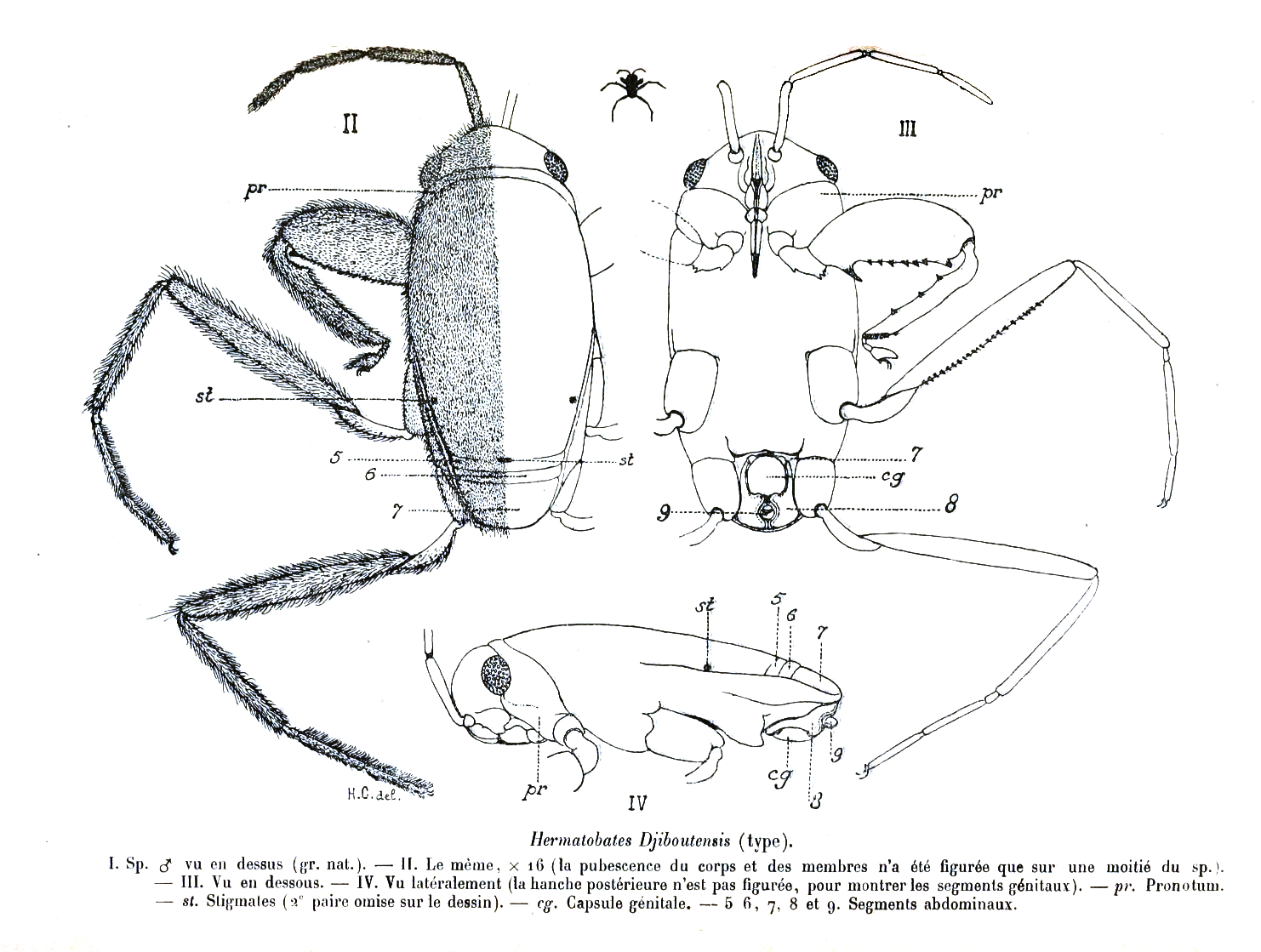
- Illustration of H. djiboutensis

Scientific classification
- Domain: Eukaryota
- Kingdom: Animalia
- Phylum: Arthropoda
- Class: Insecta
- Order: Hemiptera
- Suborder: Heteroptera
- Infraorder: Gerromorpha
- Superfamily: Gerroidea
- Family: Hermatobatidae; Poisson, 1965
- Genus: Hermatobates; Carpenter, 1892

Type species
- Hermatobates haddoni Carpenter, 1892

= Hermatobates =

Genus of true bugs

Hermatobates is a genus of wingless marine bugs placed as the sole genus in the family Hermatobatidae that are sometimes known as coral-treaders. They are quite rare and known only from coral reefs in the Indo-Pacific region. During low tide, they move over the water surface not unlike the more familiar water-striders around coral atolls and reefs and stay submerged in reef crevices during high tide.

The genus was described by the amateur entomologist Rev. George Carpenter in 1892 on the basis of a single specimen obtained from Mabuiag Island in the Torres Straits by Alfred Cort Haddon. The species was described as H. haddoni. The species are very rare and difficult to observe in life. Most subsequent specimens in the genus have been captured using neuston drag nets, sometimes with artificial lights at night. They are differentiated from the striders in the Gerridae by the presence of three tarsal segments on all the legs and with pre-apical claws only on the fore-tarsi. The pronotum is short while the meso- and metanotum are fused.

== Species ==
At least 13 species are known:

- Hermatobates armatus Andersen & Weir, 2000
- Hermatobates bredini Herring, 1965
- Hermatobates djiboutensis Coutiere & Martin, 1901
- Hermatobates haddoni Carpenter, 1892
- Hermatobates hawaiiensis China, 1957
- Hermatobates kula J. Polhemus & D. Polhemus, 2006
- Hermatobates lingyangjiaoensis Luo, Chen, Wang & Xie, 2019
- Hermatobates marchei Coutiere & Martin, 1901
- Hermatobates palmyra J. Polhemus & D. Polhemus, 2012
- Hermatobates schuhi J. Polhemus & D. Polhemus, 2012
- Hermatobates singaporensis Cheng, 1976
- Hermatobates tiarae Herring, 1965
- Hermatobates weddi China, 1957
