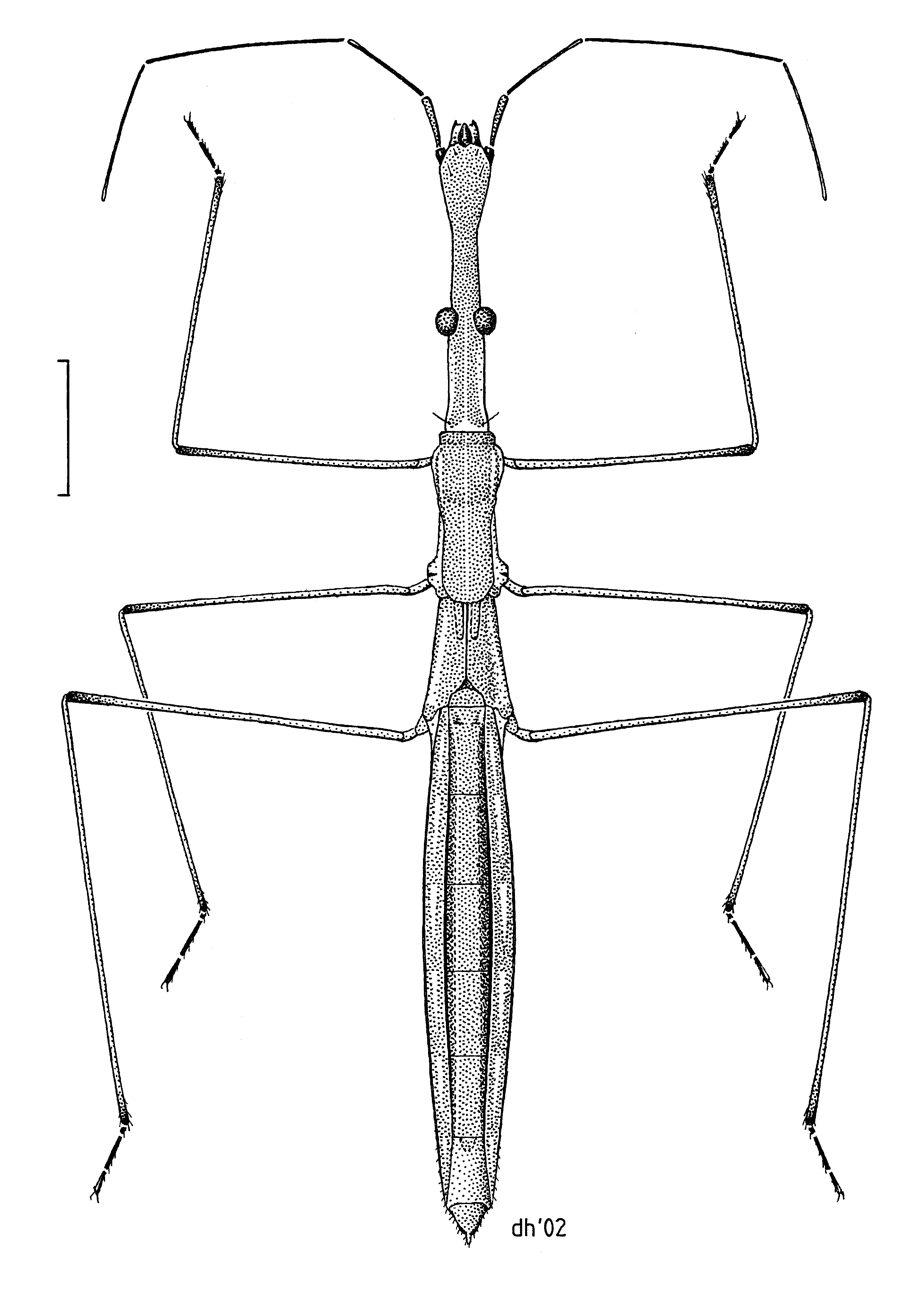
- Hydrometra strigosa

Scientific classification
- Kingdom: Animalia
- Phylum: Arthropoda
- Class: Insecta
- Order: Hemiptera
- Suborder: Heteroptera
- Family: Hydrometridae
- Subfamily: Hydrometrinae
- Genus: Hydrometra; Latreille, 1797

Diversity
- at least 120 species

Synonyms
- Limnametra Burmeister, 1835; Limnobates Burmeister, 1835

= Hydrometra =

Genus of true bugs

Hydrometra is a genus of water measurers in the family Hydrometridae. There are more than 120 described species in Hydrometra.

== See also ==
- List of Hydrometra species
