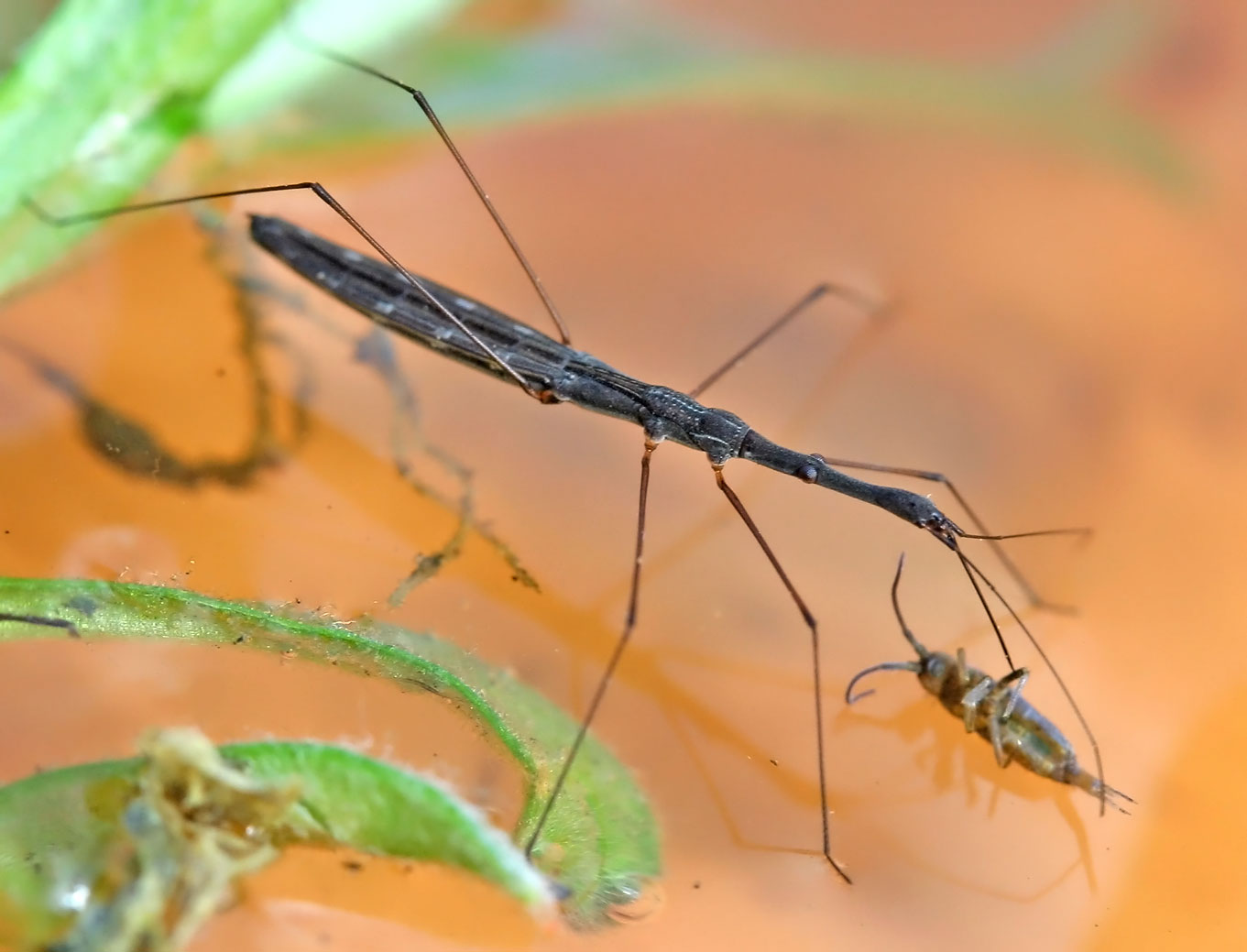
- Hydrometra stagnorum

Scientific classification
- Kingdom: Animalia
- Phylum: Arthropoda
- Class: Insecta
- Order: Hemiptera
- Suborder: Heteroptera
- Infraorder: Gerromorpha
- Superfamily: Hydrometroidea
- Family: Hydrometridae

Subfamilies and genera
- Heterocleptinae; Heterocleptes; Veliometra; Hydrometrinae; Baciliometra; Chaetometra; Dolichocephalometra; Hydrometra; Limnobatodinae; Limnobatodes

= Hydrometridae =

Hydrometridae Temporal range: Upper Aptian - Present, 115–0 Ma

Family of true bugs

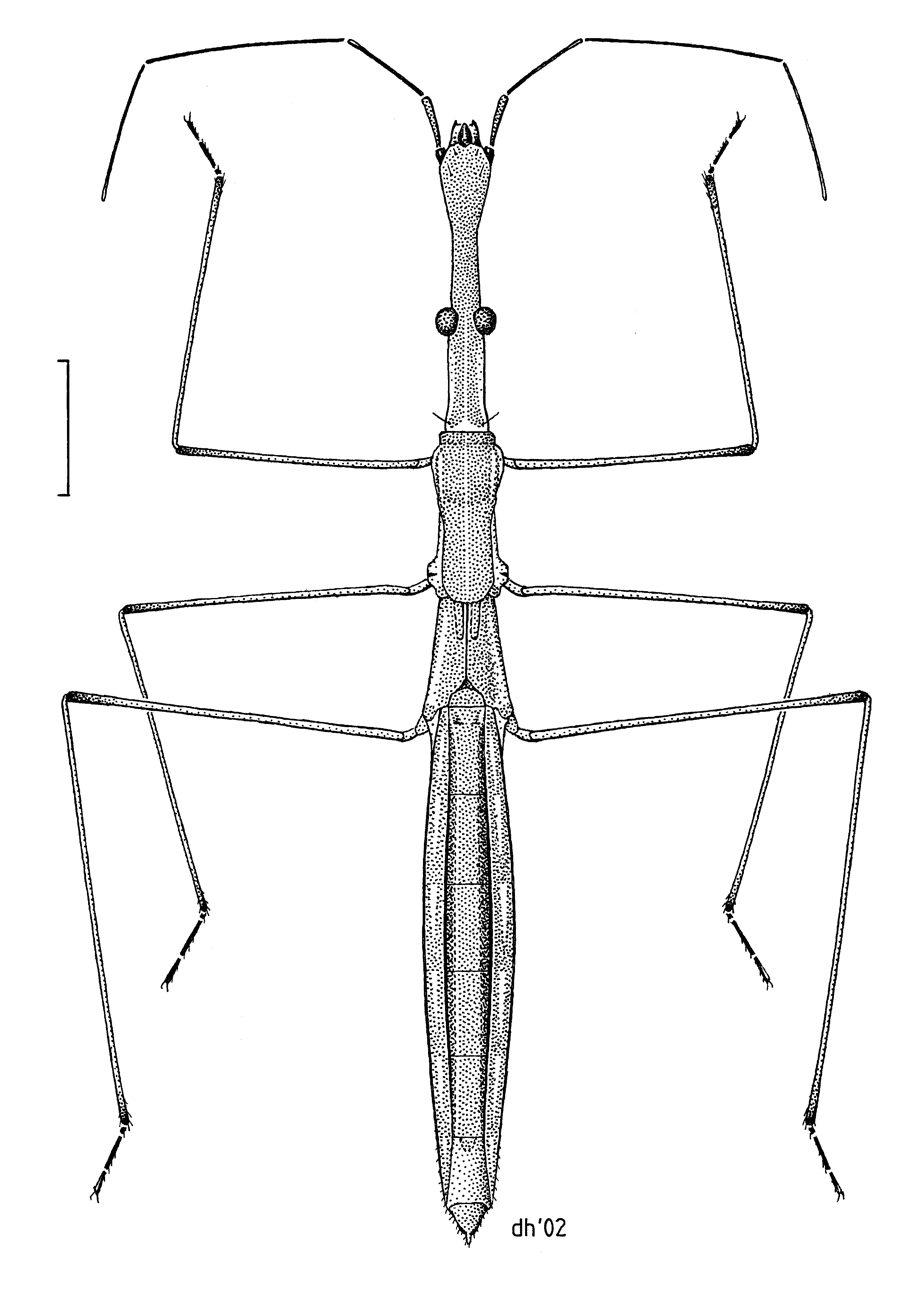
Hydrometra strigosa

Hydrometridae is a family of semiaquatic insects, known as marsh treaders or water measurers. They have a characteristic elongated head and body which makes them resemble a yardstick for measuring the water surface.

== Appearance ==
Hydrometrid bugs are of a greyish or pale brown colour, and relatively large amongst Gerromorpha at around 8 mm, although some can exceed 15 mm. Their body and legs are long and slender, to the point where they resemble tiny phasmatodeans. The family is mostly wingless, but winged forms do occur. The head is long as well, usually more so than the body. Their eyes are located a little behind the middle of the head and tend to bulge. Their antennae, positioned at the end of its head are four-segmented and their tarsi three-segmented .

== Habitat and ecology ==
Marsh treaders are fairly common and have been found throughout the world. The greatest diversity, however, is found within the tropics, with only Hydrometra occurring elsewhere. The family is notable for having two genera, Chaetometra and Dolichocephalometra, which are present in the Marquesas Islands where nearly all other Gerramorpha are absent . They usually occur on water surfaces at the edges of lakes, ponds, and wetlands, most often where fish are not present. They prefer aquatic vegetation or will slowly walk across calm waters, but will move quickly when disturbed . They are predatory, and will feed but also scavenge fallen animals, surface-dwelling springtails being one of their favorite meals. They are also great climbers and will climb plants to find insects to eat and to lay their eggs above the water. They will use their barbed rostrum to spear their prey in the surface film . They have been generally found to have five immature stages and become adults within four to six weeks.

== Systematics ==
The family comprises three subfamilies of seven genera, and more than 147 species are currently recognised. One subfamily is Heterocleptinae, which has tiny hairs covering its head, thorax, and base of the abdomen and a relatively broad and short pronotum; it comprises two genera, Heterocleptes (Villiers), of four species from Africa and Borneo, and Veliometra (Andersen), with a single species in the Amazon Basin of Brazil. The second subfamily is Hydrometrinae, with micro- and macro-hairs covering its entire body and the pronotum length being much shorter than the ante-ocular portion of the head. It includes the genera Baciliometra (Esaki), with four species from tropical South America, Chaetometra (Hungerford) and Dolichocephalometra (Hungerford), two monotypic genera from the Marquesas Islands, and Hydrometra, of at least 80 species worldwide and all North American species. The final subfamily is Limnobatodinae, which is closely related to Hydrometrinae, although it has hairs only on its head, thorax, and base of the abdomen, and pronotum longer than the ante-ocular portion of its head. It comprises a single species, Limnobatodes paradoxus (Hussey), from Belize, Brazil and Peru .
