= Graptocorixa californica =

Scientific classification
- Domain: Eukaryota
- Kingdom: Animalia
- Phylum: Arthropoda
- Class: Insecta
- Order: Hemiptera
- Suborder: Heteroptera
- Family: Corixidae
- Subfamily: Corixinae
- Genus: Graptocorixa
- Species: G. californica

Binomial name
- Graptocorixa californica (Hungerford, 1925)

Species of true bug

Graptocorixa californica is a species of water boatman in the family Corixidae. It is found in North America.
