= Cenocorixa expleta =

Scientific classification
- Domain: Eukaryota
- Kingdom: Animalia
- Phylum: Arthropoda
- Class: Insecta
- Order: Hemiptera
- Suborder: Heteroptera
- Family: Corixidae
- Subfamily: Corixinae
- Genus: Cenocorixa
- Species: C. expleta

Binomial name
- Cenocorixa expleta (Uhler, 1895)

Species of true bug

Cenocorixa expleta is a species of water boatman in the family Corixidae. It is found in North America.
