= Cenocorixa bifida =

Scientific classification
- Domain: Eukaryota
- Kingdom: Animalia
- Phylum: Arthropoda
- Class: Insecta
- Order: Hemiptera
- Suborder: Heteroptera
- Family: Corixidae
- Subfamily: Corixinae
- Genus: Cenocorixa
- Species: C. bifida

Binomial name
- Cenocorixa bifida (Hungerford, 1926)

Species of true bug

Cenocorixa bifida is a species of water boatman in the family Corixidae. It is found in North America.

== Subspecies ==
These two subspecies belong to the species Cenocorixa bifida:

- Cenocorixa bifida bifida (Hungerford, 1926)
- Cenocorixa bifida hungerfordi Lansbury, 1960
