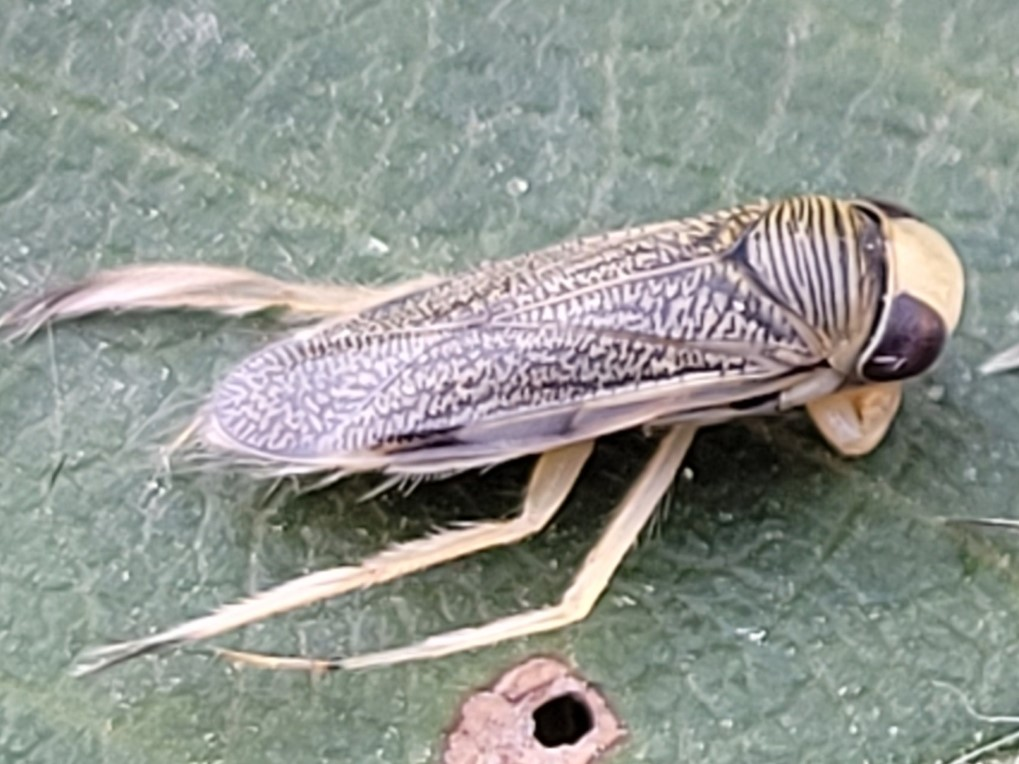

Scientific classification
- Domain: Eukaryota
- Kingdom: Animalia
- Phylum: Arthropoda
- Class: Insecta
- Order: Hemiptera
- Suborder: Heteroptera
- Family: Corixidae
- Subfamily: Corixinae
- Genus: Cenocorixa
- Species: C. dakotensis

Binomial name
- Cenocorixa dakotensis (Hungerford, 1928)

= Cenocorixa dakotensis =

Species of true bug

Cenocorixa dakotensis is a species of water boatman in the family Corixidae. It is found in North America.
