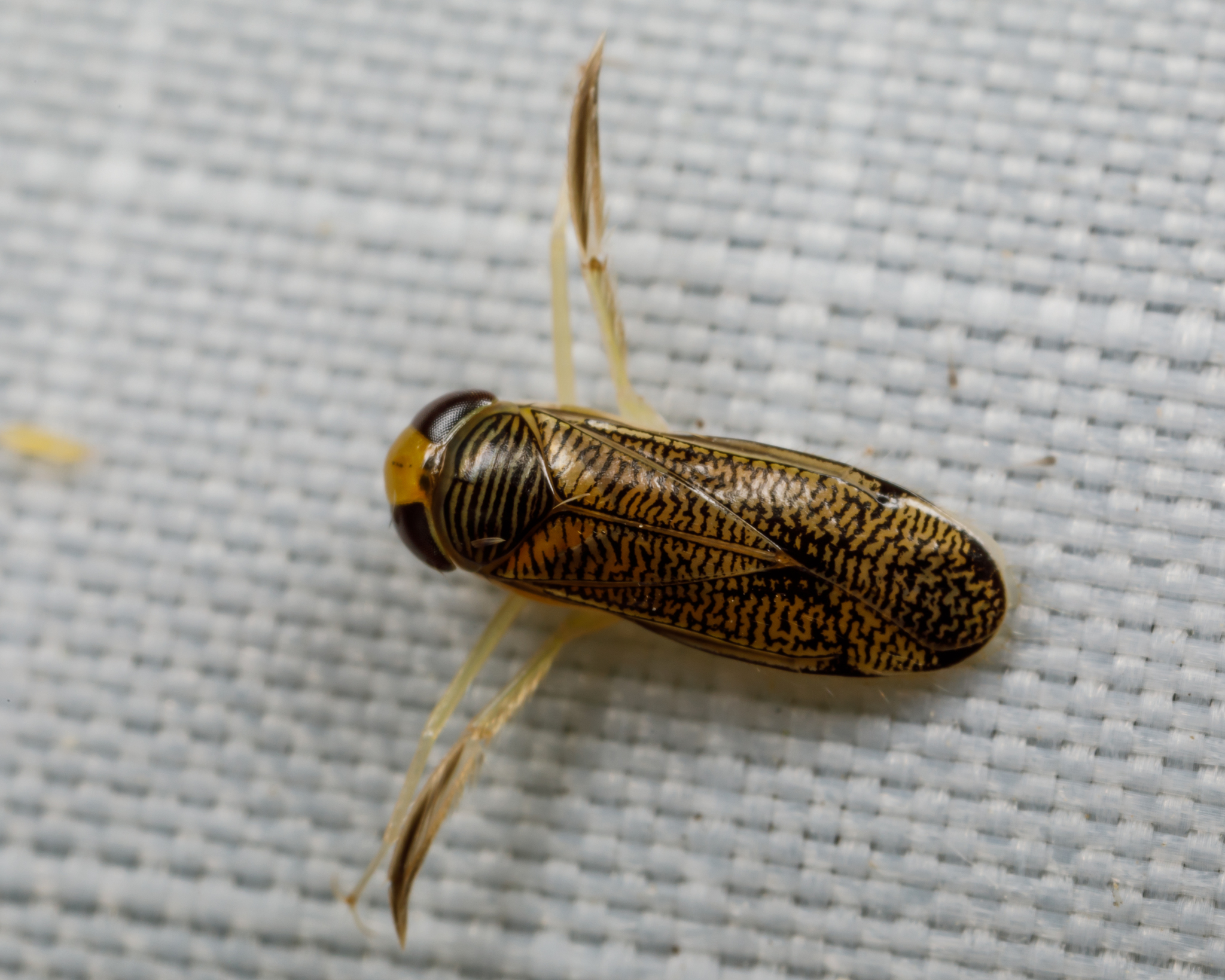

Scientific classification
- Domain: Eukaryota
- Kingdom: Animalia
- Phylum: Arthropoda
- Class: Insecta
- Order: Hemiptera
- Suborder: Heteroptera
- Family: Corixidae
- Subfamily: Corixinae
- Tribe: Corixini
- Genus: Trichocorixa; Kirkaldy, 1908

= Trichocorixa =

Genus of true bugs

Trichocorixa is a genus of water boatmen in the family Corixidae. There are about 14 described species in Trichocorixa.

== Species ==
These 14 species belong to the genus Trichocorixa:

- Trichocorixa arizonensis Sailer, 1948
- Trichocorixa beebei Sailer
- Trichocorixa borealis Sailer, 1948
- Trichocorixa calva (Say, 1832)
- Trichocorixa confusa
- Trichocorixa kanza Sailer, 1948
- Trichocorixa louisianae Jaczewski, 1931
- Trichocorixa macroceps (Kirkaldy, 1908)
- Trichocorixa mendozana Jaczewski
- Trichocorixa minima (Abbott, 1913)
- Trichocorixa reticulata (Guérin-Méneville, 1857)
- Trichocorixa sexcincta (Champion, 1901)
- Trichocorixa uhleri Sailer, 1948
- Trichocorixa verticalis (Fieber, 1851)
