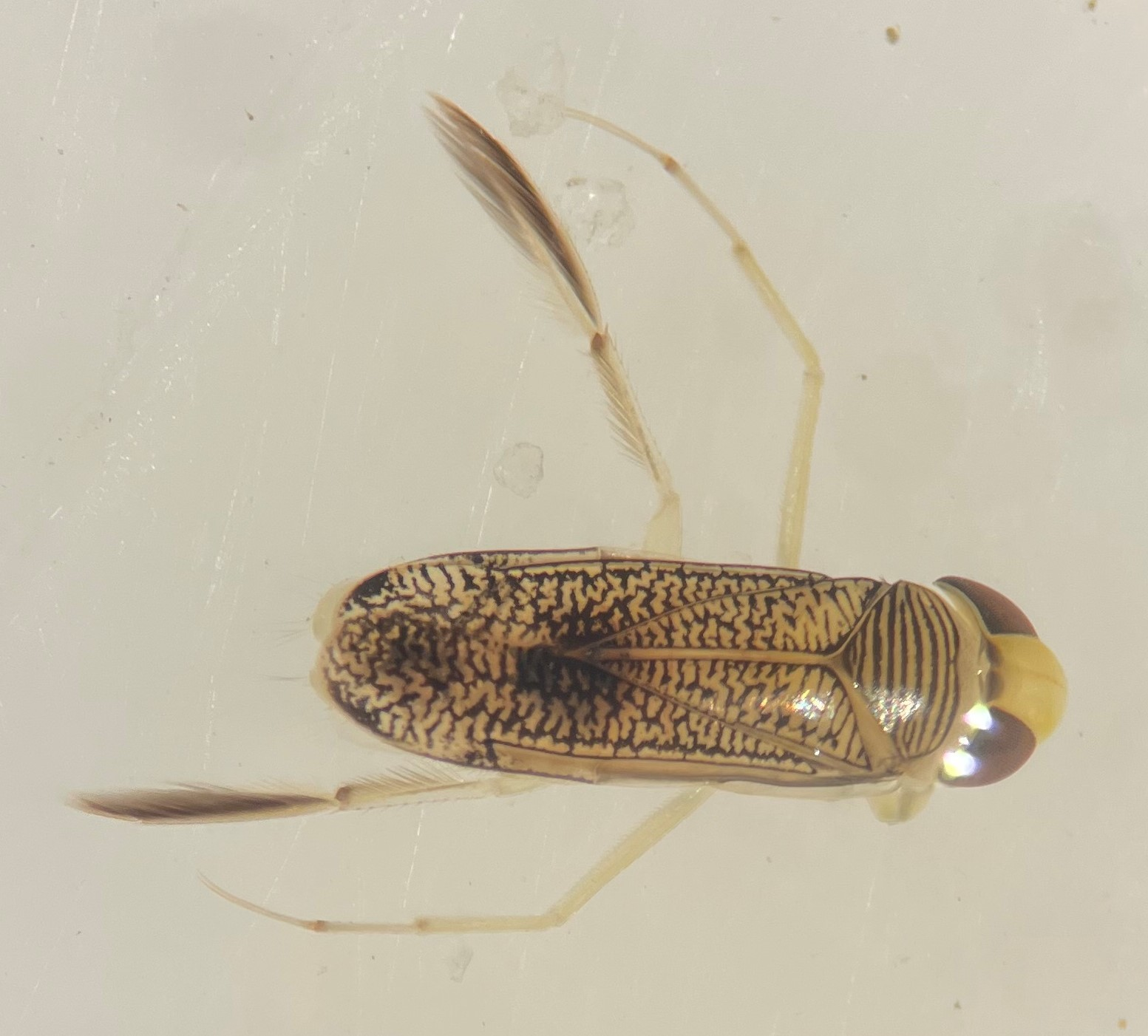

Scientific classification
- Domain: Eukaryota
- Kingdom: Animalia
- Phylum: Arthropoda
- Class: Insecta
- Order: Hemiptera
- Suborder: Heteroptera
- Family: Corixidae
- Genus: Trichocorixa
- Species: T. calva

Binomial name
- Trichocorixa calva (Say, 1832)

= Trichocorixa calva =

Species of true bug

Trichocorixa calva is a species of water boatman in the family Corixidae. It is found in North America.
