= Graptocorixa abdominalis =

Scientific classification
- Domain: Eukaryota
- Kingdom: Animalia
- Phylum: Arthropoda
- Class: Insecta
- Order: Hemiptera
- Suborder: Heteroptera
- Family: Corixidae
- Genus: Graptocorixa
- Species: G. abdominalis

Binomial name
- Graptocorixa abdominalis (Say, 1832)

Synonyms
- Corixa abdominalis Say, 1832

Species of true bug

Graptocorixa abdominalis is a species of water boatman in the family Corixidae. It is found in Central America and North America.
