= Cenocorixa =

Scientific classification
- Domain: Eukaryota
- Kingdom: Animalia
- Phylum: Arthropoda
- Class: Insecta
- Order: Hemiptera
- Suborder: Heteroptera
- Family: Corixidae
- Subfamily: Corixinae
- Genus: Cenocorixa; Hungerford, 1948

Genus of true bugs

Cenocorixa is a genus of water boatmen in the family Corixidae. There are about 12 described species in Cenocorixa.

== Species ==
These 12 species belong to the genus Cenocorixa:

- Cenocorixa andersoni Hungerford, 1948
- Cenocorixa bifida (Hungerford, 1926)
- Cenocorixa blaisdelli (Hungerford, 1930)
- Cenocorixa bui Ren & Zhu, 2010
- Cenocorixa crestiforma Ren & Zhu, 2010
- Cenocorixa dakotensis (Hungerford, 1928)
- Cenocorixa expleta (Uhler, 1895)
- Cenocorixa kuiterti Hungerford, 1948
- Cenocorixa montana Ren & Zhu, 2010
- Cenocorixa utahensis (Hungerford, 1925)
- Cenocorixa wileyi Hungerford, 1926
- Cenocorixa yuanjiangensis Xie & Liu, 2021
