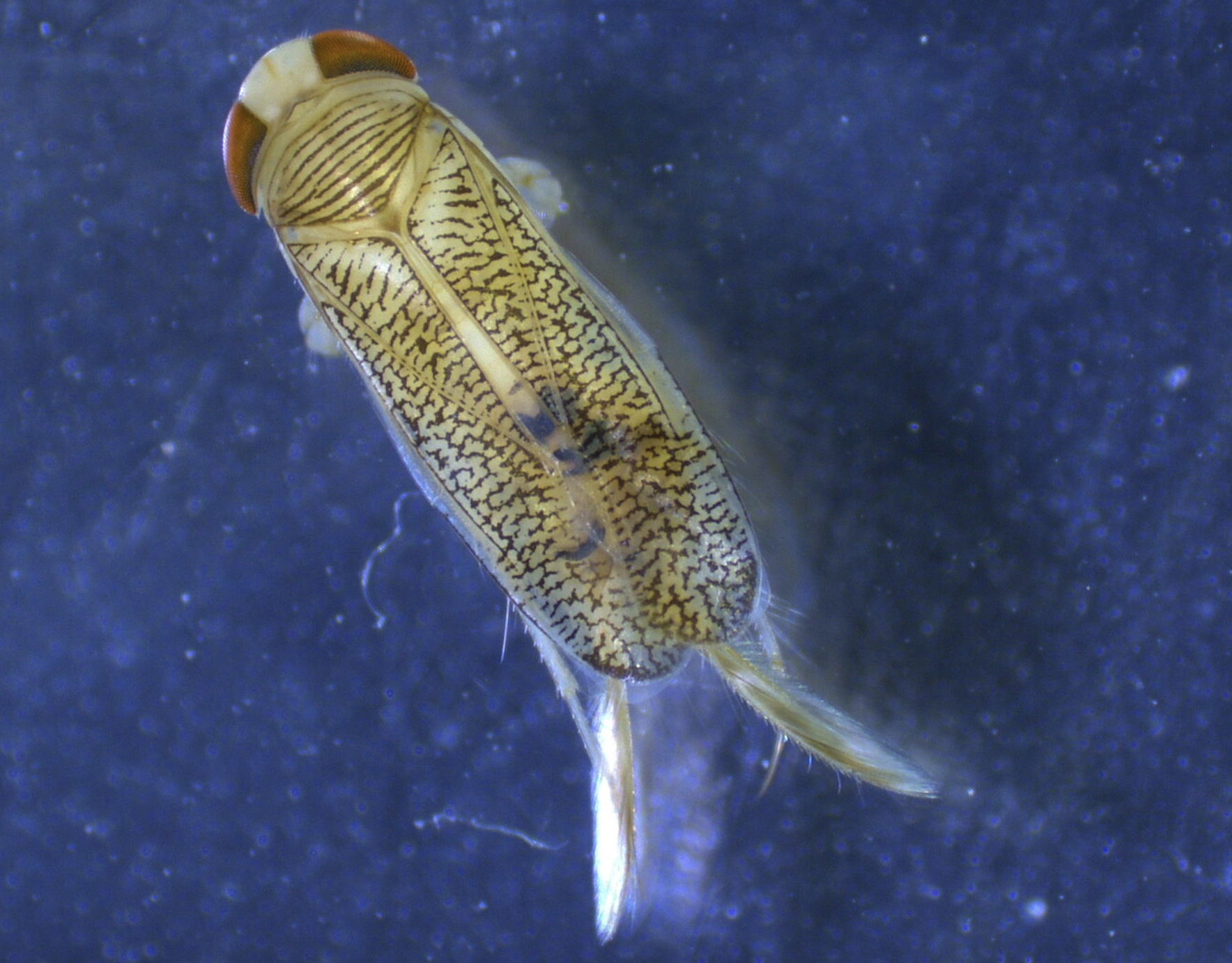

Scientific classification
- Kingdom: Animalia
- Phylum: Arthropoda
- Clade: Pancrustacea
- Class: Insecta
- Order: Hemiptera
- Suborder: Heteroptera
- Family: Corixidae
- Genus: Trichocorixa
- Species: T. kanza

Binomial name
- Trichocorixa kanza Sailer, 1948

= Trichocorixa kanza =

Species of true bug

Trichocorixa kanza is a species of water boatman in the family Corixidae. It is found in Central America and North America.
