= Graptocorixa =

Scientific classification
- Domain: Eukaryota
- Kingdom: Animalia
- Phylum: Arthropoda
- Class: Insecta
- Order: Hemiptera
- Suborder: Heteroptera
- Family: Corixidae
- Subfamily: Corixinae
- Genus: Graptocorixa; Hungerford, 1930

Genus of true bugs

Graptocorixa is a genus of water boatmen in the family Corixidae. There are about six described species in Graptocorixa.

== Species ==
- Graptocorixa abdominalis (Say, 1832)
- Graptocorixa californica (Hungerford, 1925)
- Graptocorixa gerhardi (Hungerford, 1925)
- Graptocorixa serrulata (Uhler, 1897)
- Graptocorixa uhleri (Hungerford, 1925)
- Graptocorixa uhleroidea Hungerford, 1938
