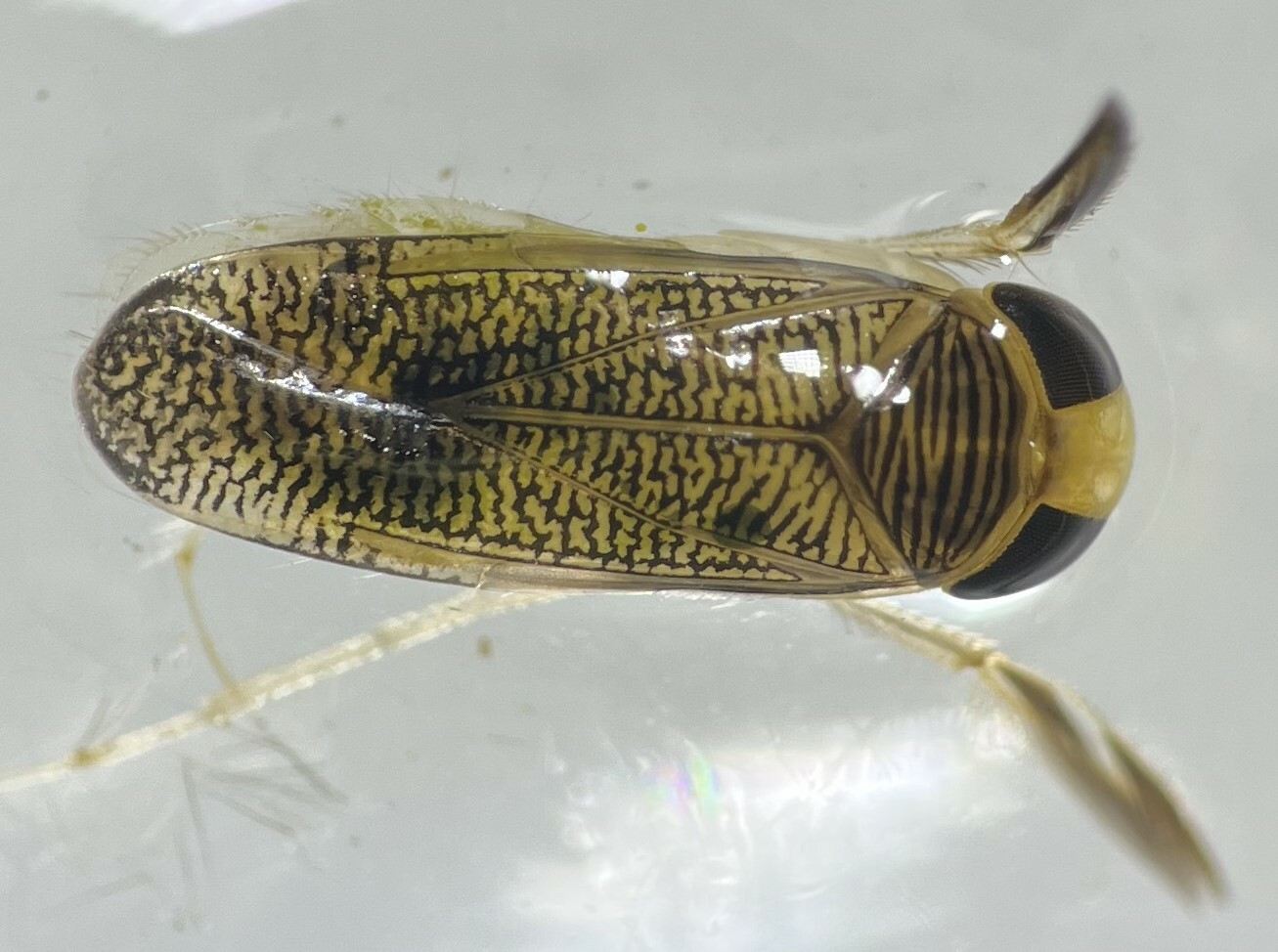

Scientific classification
- Domain: Eukaryota
- Kingdom: Animalia
- Phylum: Arthropoda
- Class: Insecta
- Order: Hemiptera
- Suborder: Heteroptera
- Family: Corixidae
- Tribe: Corixini
- Genus: Trichocorixa
- Species: T. louisianae

Binomial name
- Trichocorixa louisianae Jaczewski, 1931

= Trichocorixa louisianae =

Species of true bug

Trichocorixa louisianae is a species of water boatman in the family Corixidae. It is found in the Caribbean Sea, Central America, and North America.
