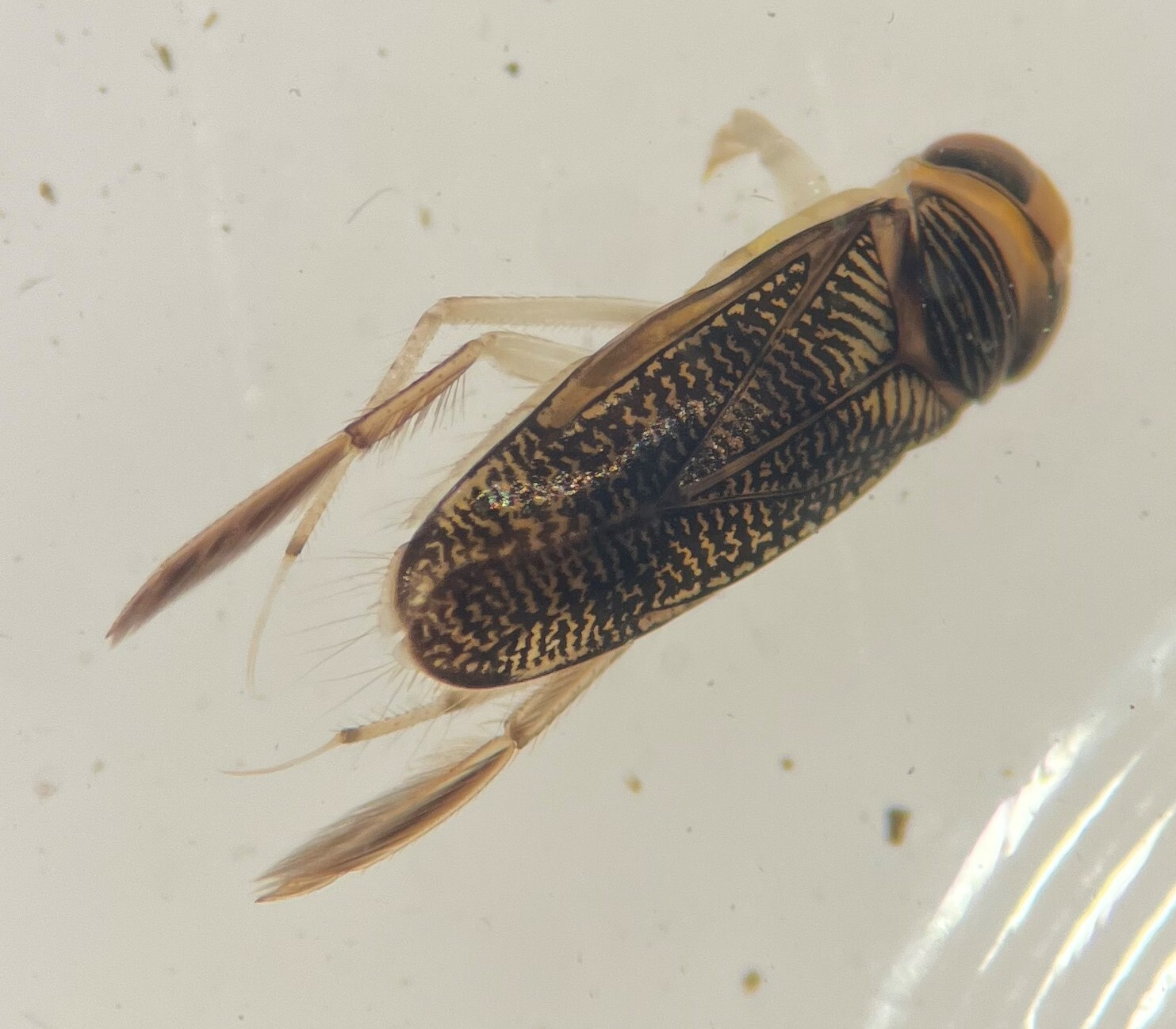

Scientific classification
- Domain: Eukaryota
- Kingdom: Animalia
- Phylum: Arthropoda
- Class: Insecta
- Order: Hemiptera
- Suborder: Heteroptera
- Family: Corixidae
- Tribe: Corixini
- Genus: Trichocorixa
- Species: T. sexcincta

Binomial name
- Trichocorixa sexcincta (Champion, 1901)

Synonyms
- Trichocorixa naias (Kirkaldy and Torre-Bueno, 1909)

= Trichocorixa sexcincta =

Species of true bug

Trichocorixa sexcincta is a species of water boatman in the family Corixidae. It is found in the Caribbean Sea, Central America, and North America.
