= Callicorixa vulnerata =

Scientific classification
- Domain: Eukaryota
- Kingdom: Animalia
- Phylum: Arthropoda
- Class: Insecta
- Order: Hemiptera
- Suborder: Heteroptera
- Family: Corixidae
- Tribe: Corixini
- Genus: Callicorixa
- Species: C. vulnerata

Binomial name
- Callicorixa vulnerata (Uhler, 1861)

Species of true bug

Callicorixa vulnerata is a species of water boatman in the family Corixidae. It is found in North America.
