= Callicorixa audeni =

Scientific classification
- Domain: Eukaryota
- Kingdom: Animalia
- Phylum: Arthropoda
- Class: Insecta
- Order: Hemiptera
- Suborder: Heteroptera
- Family: Corixidae
- Genus: Callicorixa
- Species: C. audeni

Binomial name
- Callicorixa audeni Hungerford, 1928

Species of true bug

Callicorixa audeni, or Auden's waterboatman, is a species of water boatman in the family Corixidae. It is found in North America.
