= Callicorixa wollastoni =

Scientific classification
- Domain: Eukaryota
- Kingdom: Animalia
- Phylum: Arthropoda
- Class: Insecta
- Order: Hemiptera
- Suborder: Heteroptera
- Family: Corixidae
- Genus: Callicorixa
- Species: C. wollastoni

Binomial name
- Callicorixa wollastoni (Douglas & Scott, 1865)

Species of true bug

Callicorixa wollastoni is a species of water boatman in the family Corixidae in the order Hemiptera.
