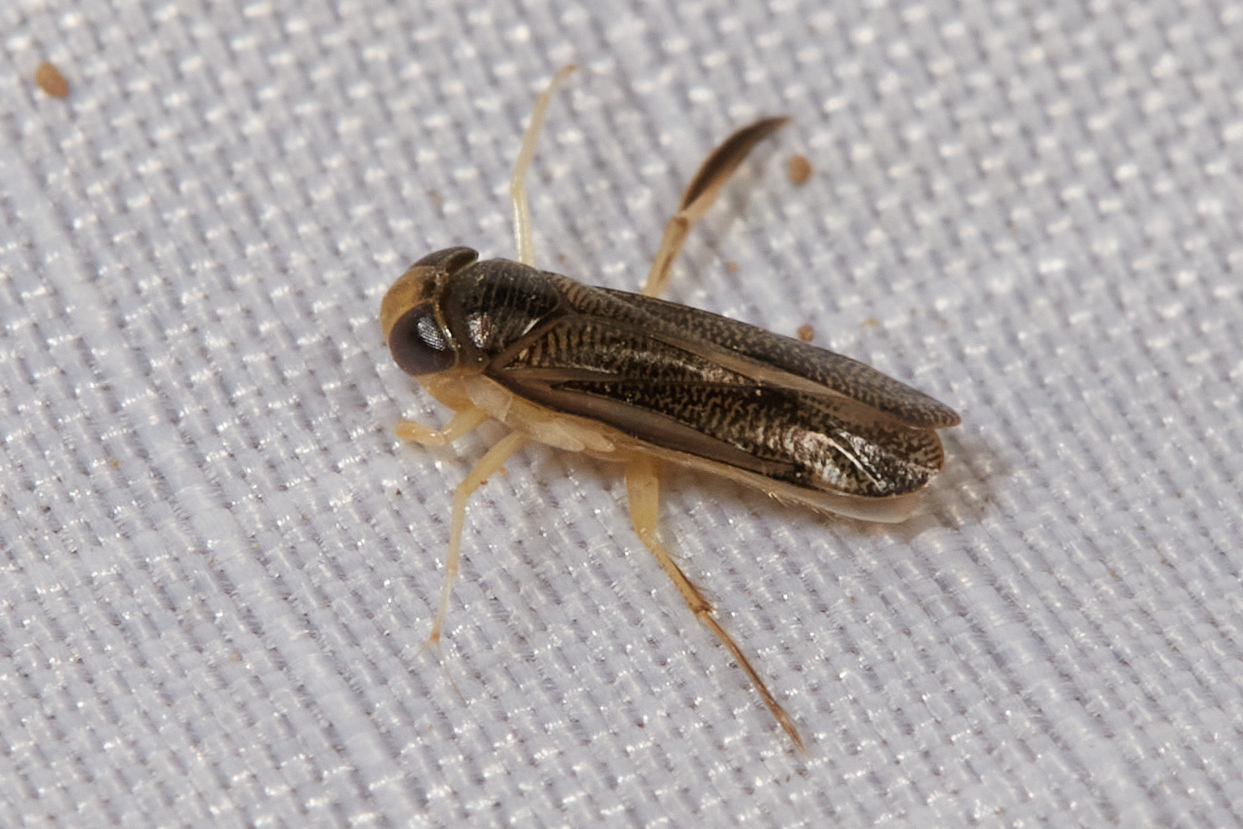

Scientific classification
- Kingdom: Animalia
- Phylum: Arthropoda
- Clade: Pancrustacea
- Class: Insecta
- Order: Hemiptera
- Suborder: Heteroptera
- Family: Corixidae
- Tribe: Corixini
- Genus: Trichocorixa
- Species: T. verticalis

Binomial name
- Trichocorixa verticalis (Fieber, 1851)

Synonyms
- Corisa pygmaea Fieber, 1851; Trichocorixa pygmaea (Fieber, 1851)

= Trichocorixa verticalis =

Species of true bug

Trichocorixa verticalis is a species of water boatman in the family Corixidae. It is found in the Caribbean Sea, Central America, and North America, but there are also some invasive populations in Spain and Portugal.

== Subspecies ==
These six subspecies belong to the species Trichocorixa verticalis:

- Trichocorixa verticalis californica Sailer, 1948
- Trichocorixa verticalis fenestrata Walley, 1930
- Trichocorixa verticalis interiores Sailer, 1948
- Trichocorixa verticalis saltoni Sailer, 1948 (found at the Salton Sea and Death Valley)
- Trichocorixa verticalis sellaris (Abbott, 1913)
- Trichocorixa verticalis verticalis (Fieber, 1851)
