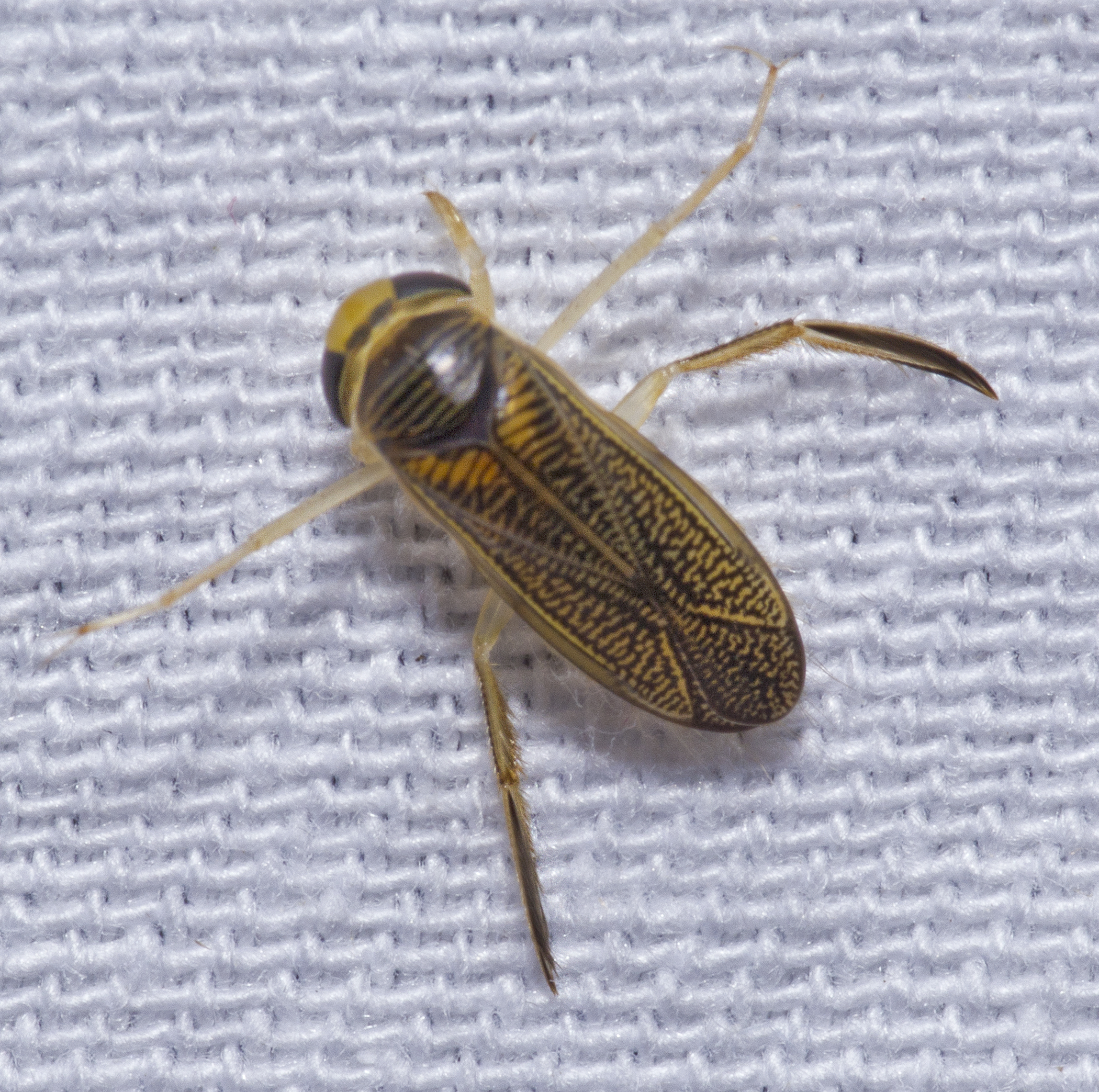
- Callicorixa praeusta

Scientific classification
- Kingdom: Animalia
- Phylum: Arthropoda
- Class: Insecta
- Order: Hemiptera
- Suborder: Heteroptera
- Family: Corixidae
- Subfamily: Corixinae
- Tribe: Corixini
- Genus: Callicorixa; White, 1873

= Callicorixa =

Genus of true bugs

Callicorixa is a genus of water boatmen in the family Corixidae. There are about nine described species in Callicorixa.

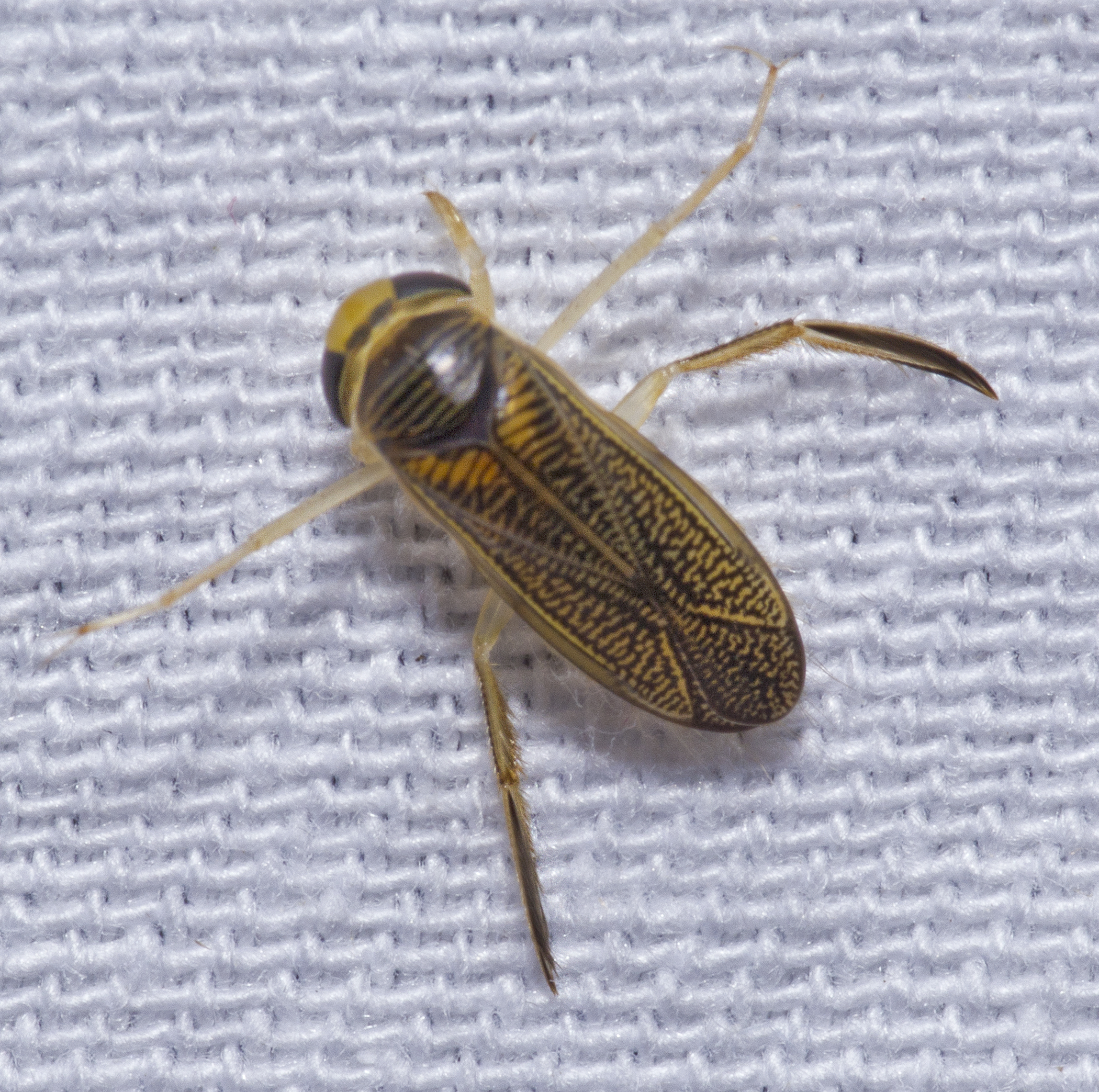
Callicorixa praeusta

== Species ==
These nine species belong to the genus Callicorixa:

- Callicorixa alaskensis Hungerford, 1926
- Callicorixa audeni Hungerford, 1928 (Auden's waterboatman)
- Callicorixa gebleri (Fieber, 1848)
- Callicorixa praeusta (Fieber, 1848)
- Callicorixa producta (Reuter, 1880)
- Callicorixa scudderi Jansson, 1979
- Callicorixa tetoni Hungerford, 1948
- Callicorixa vulnerata (Uhler, 1861)
- Callicorixa wollastoni (Douglas & Scott, 1865)
