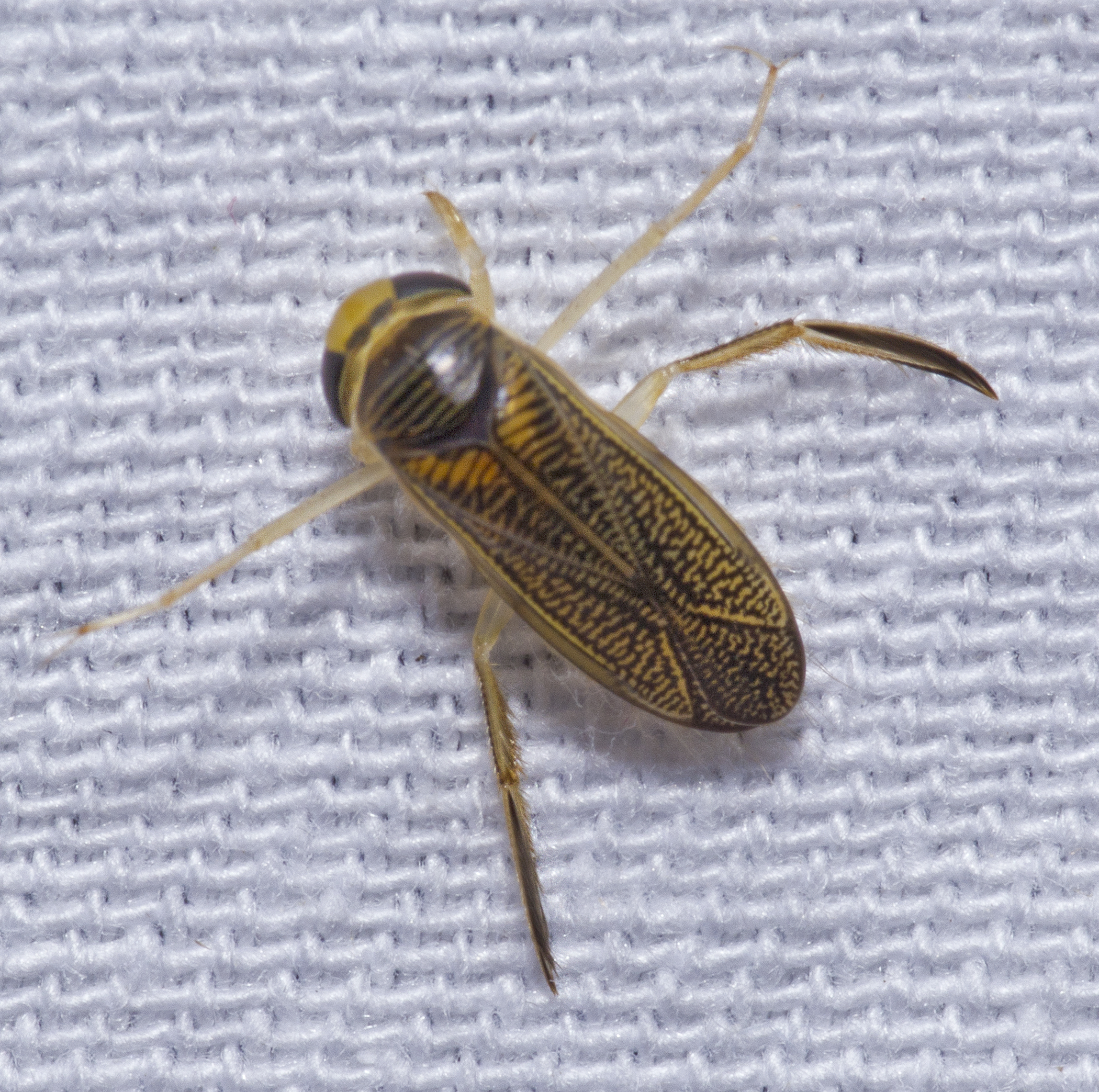

Scientific classification
- Kingdom: Animalia
- Phylum: Arthropoda
- Class: Insecta
- Order: Hemiptera
- Suborder: Heteroptera
- Family: Corixidae
- Genus: Callicorixa
- Species: C. praeusta

Binomial name
- Callicorixa praeusta (Fieber, 1848)

= Callicorixa praeusta =

Species of true bug

Callicorixa praeusta is a species of Corixidae or water boatman, in the order Hemiptera.
