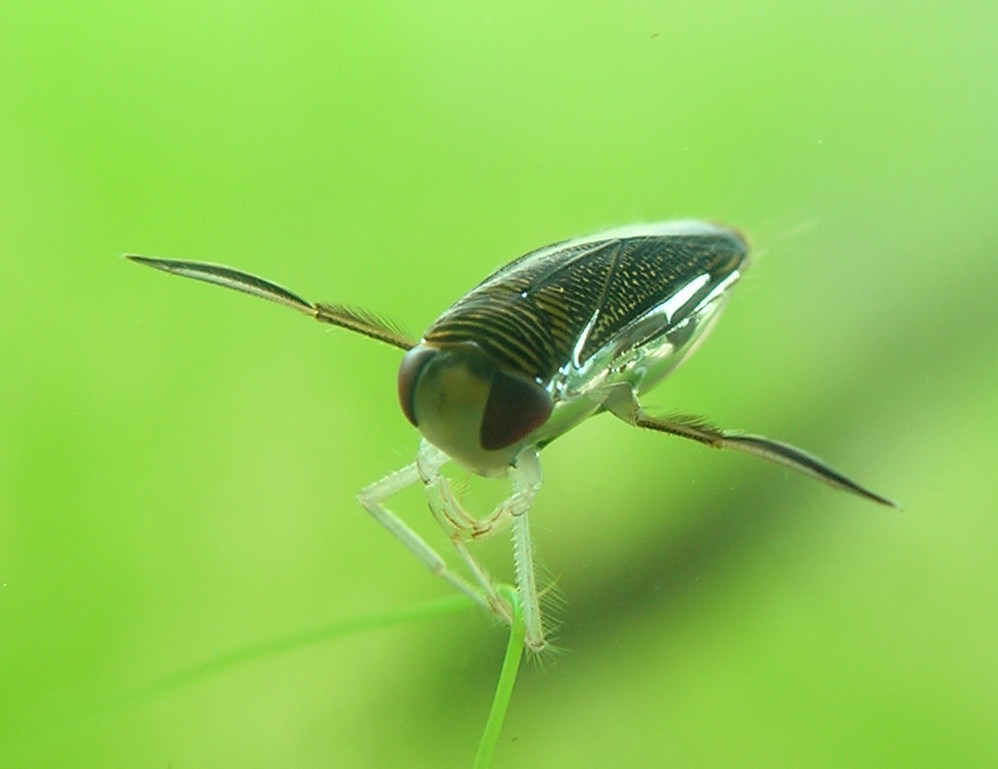
- Corixa punctata

Scientific classification
- Domain: Eukaryota
- Kingdom: Animalia
- Phylum: Arthropoda
- Class: Insecta
- Order: Hemiptera
- Suborder: Heteroptera
- Family: Corixidae
- Subfamily: Corixinae; Leach, 1815

= Corixinae =

Subfamily of true bugs

Corixinae is a subfamily of aquatic bugs in the family Corixidae. There are at least 130 described species in Corixinae.

== Genera ==
- Agraptocorixini Kirkaldy, 1998
- Arctocorisa Wallengren, 1894
- Callicorixa White, 1873
- Cenocorixa Hungerford, 1948
- Centrocorisa Lundblad, 1928
- Corisella Lundblad, 1928
- Corixa Geoffroy, 1762
- Dasycorixa Hungerford, 1948
- Glaenocorisa Thomson, 1869
- Graptocorixa Hungerford, 1930
- Hesperocorixa Kirkaldy, 1908
- Morphocorixa Jaczewski, 1931
- Neocorixa Hungerford, 1925
- Palmacorixa Abbott, 1912
- Palmocorixa
- Pseudocorixa Jaczewski, 1931
- Ramphocorixa Abbott, 1912
- Sigara Fabricius, 1775
- Trichocorixa Kirkaldy, 1908
