= List of Psylla species =

The following species belong to Psylla, a genus of plant-parasitic hemipterans in the family Psyllidae.

== Psylla species ==
1. Psylla aceris Loginova, 1964^{c g}
2. Psylla aili Yang & Li, 1984^{c g}
3. Psylla alni (Linné, 1758)^{c g}
4. Psylla alnicola Li, 1992^{c g}
5. Psylla alnifasciata Li, 2011^{c g}
6. Psylla alniformosanaesuga Lauterer, Yang & Fang, 1988^{c g}
7. Psylla alpina Foerster, 1848^{c g}
8. Psylla ancylocaula Li, 2011^{c g}
9. Psylla aranetae Miyatake, 1972^{c g}
10. Psylla arisana Kuwayama, 1908^{c g}
11. Psylla aurea Li, 2011^{c g}
12. Psylla aureicapita Li, 2011^{c g}
13. Psylla bakeri Crawford, 1919^{c g}
14. Psylla baphicacanthi Yang, 1984^{c g}
15. Psylla betulae (Linné, 1758)^{c g}
16. Psylla betulaenanae Ossiannilsson, 1970^{c g b} (dwarf birch psyllid)
17. Psylla betulibetuliae Li, 2011^{c g}
18. Psylla borealis Horvath, 1908^{c g}
19. Psylla buxi (Linné, 1758)^{c g b} (boxwood psyllid)
20. Psylla capricornis Li, 2005^{c g}
21. Psylla carpinicola Crawford, 1914^{c g b}
22. Psylla caudata Crawford, 1914^{c g}
23. Psylla cedrelae Kieffer, 1905^{c g}
24. Psylla chaenomelei Yang & Li, 1984^{c g}
25. Psylla changli Yang & Li, 1981^{c g}
26. Psylla chujoi Miyatake, 1982^{c g}
27. Psylla colorada Crawford, 1917^{c g}
28. Psylla compta Crawford, 1919^{c g}
29. Psylla cordata Tamanini, 1977^{c g}
30. Psylla cotoneastericola Li, 2005^{c g}
31. Psylla crenata Crawford, 1917^{c g}
32. Psylla cunashiri Konovalova, 1981^{c g}
33. Psylla curticapita Li, 2011^{c g}
34. Psylla deflua Yang, 1984^{c g}
35. Psylla dianli Yang & Li, 1984^{c g}
36. Psylla distincta Pettey, 1933^{c g}
37. Psylla eastopi Mathur, 1975^{c g}
38. Psylla eriobotryacola Yang, 1984^{c g}
39. Psylla eriobotryae Yang, 1984^{c g}
40. Psylla floccosa Patch, 1909^{c g b} (cottony alder psyllid)
41. Psylla formosana Yang, 1984^{c g}
42. Psylla fumosa Crawford, 1919^{c g}
43. Psylla fusca (Zetterstedt, 1828)^{c g}
44. Psylla fuscinodulus Enderlein, 1918^{c g}
45. Psylla grata Yang, 1984^{c g}
46. Psylla hippophae Li, 2011^{c g}
47. Psylla huabeialnia Li, 2011^{c g}
48. Psylla hyalina Mathur, 1975^{c g}
49. Psylla ignescens Li & Yang, 1984^{c g}
50. Psylla ileicis Li, 2011^{c g}
51. Psylla indica (Yang, 1984)^{c g}
52. Psylla indicata Yang, 1984^{c g}
53. Psylla infesta Yang, 1984^{c g}
54. Psylla ingae Tuthill, 1959^{c g}
55. Psylla juiliensis Yang, 1984^{c g}
56. Psylla kilimandjaroensis Enderlein, 1910^{c g}
57. Psylla kotejai Drohojowska & Klimaszewski, 2006^{c g}
58. Psylla lanceolata Yang, 1984^{c g}
59. Psylla leprosa Crawford, 1919^{c g}
60. Psylla litchi Giard, 1893^{c g}
61. Psylla liuheica Li, 2011^{c g}
62. Psylla longicauda Konovalova, 1986^{c g}
63. Psylla longigena Mathur, 1975^{c g}
64. Psylla loranthi Capener, 1973^{c g}
65. Psylla magnifera Kuwayama, 1908^{c g}
66. Psylla mala Yang, 1984^{c g}
67. Psylla mecoura Li, 2011^{c g}
68. Psylla minima Konovalova, 1979^{c g}
69. Psylla minutiforma Caldwell, 1944^{c g}
70. Psylla montanica Gegechkori, 1981^{c g}
71. Psylla morimotoi Miyatake, 1963^{c g}
72. Psylla muiri Crawford, 1919^{c g}
73. Psylla multipunctata Miyatake, 1964^{c g}
74. Psylla murrayi Mathur, 1975^{c g}
75. Psylla neolitseae Miyatake, 1981^{c g}
76. Psylla nigella Konovalova, 1979^{c g}
77. Psylla obliqua (Thomson, 1877)^{c g}
78. Psylla oblonga Mathur, 1975^{c g}
79. Psylla octomaculata Konovalova, 1980^{c g}
80. Psylla omogoensis Miyatake, 1963^{c g}
81. Psylla opulenta Yang, 1984^{c g}
82. Psylla pamirica Baeva, 1966^{c g}
83. Psylla picciconica Li, 2011^{c g}
84. Psylla plagiosticta Li, 2011^{c g}
85. Psylla praevia Loginova, 1964^{c g}
86. Psylla prima Fang & Yang, 1986^{g}
87. Psylla pulla Yang, 1984^{c g}
88. Psylla quianli Yang & Li, 1984^{c g}
89. Psylla ribicola Loginova, 1964^{c g}
90. Psylla rigida Yang, 1984^{c g}
91. Psylla rubescens Li & Yang, 1984^{c g}
92. Psylla sanguinea (Provancher, 1872)^{c g b}
93. Psylla santali Mathur, 1975^{c g}
94. Psylla sarcospermae (Li, 2011)^{c g}
95. Psylla sibirica Loginova, 1966^{c g}
96. Psylla simaoli Yang & Li, 1984^{c g}
97. Psylla simlae Crawford, 1912^{c g}
98. Psylla spadica Kuwayama, 1908^{c g}
99. Psylla stranvaesiae Yang, 1984^{c g}
100. Psylla sulcata Mathur, 1973^{c g}
101. Psylla tayulinensis Yang, 1984^{c g}
102. Psylla tetrapanaxae Yang, 1984^{c g}
103. Psylla torrida Crawford, 1914^{c g}
104. Psylla unica Bajeva, 1978^{c g}
105. Psylla viccifoliae Yang & Li, 1984^{c g}
106. Psylla viridescens (Provancher, 1872)^{c g b}
107. Psylla vulpis Loginova, 1964^{c g}
108. Psylla winkleri Rübsaamen, 1910^{c g}
109. Psylla yasumatsui Miyatake, 1963^{c g}
110. Psylla yunli Yang & Li, 1984^{c g}
111. Psylla ziozankeana Kuwayama, 1908^{c g}

Data sources: i = ITIS, c = Catalogue of Life, g = GBIF, b = Bugguide.net
