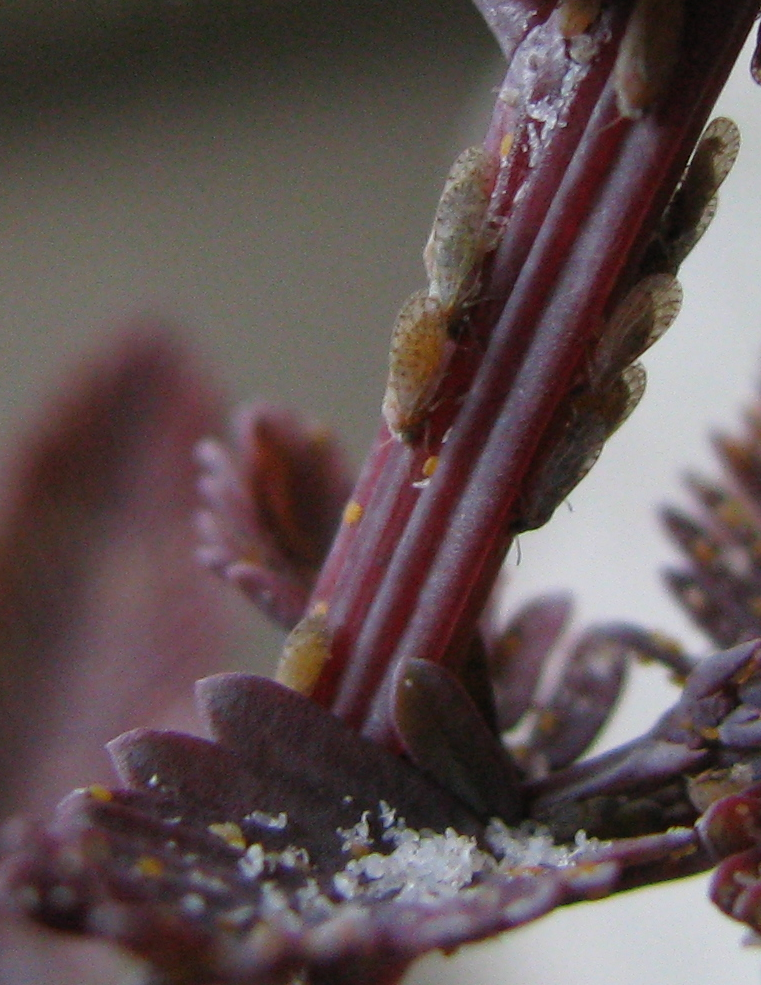

Scientific classification
- Domain: Eukaryota
- Kingdom: Animalia
- Phylum: Arthropoda
- Class: Insecta
- Order: Hemiptera
- Suborder: Sternorrhyncha
- Family: Psyllidae
- Genus: Acizzia
- Species: A. acaciaebaileyanae

Binomial name
- Acizzia acaciaebaileyanae (Froggatt, 1901)

Synonyms
- Acizzia acaciaebaileyana (Froggatt, 1901); Arytaina acaciaebaileyanae (Froggatt, 1901); Neopsylla unctata (Ferris & Klyver, 1932); Psylla acaciaebaileyanae Froggatt, 1901; Psylla uncata Ferris & Klyver, 1932; Psylla unctata Ferris & Klyver, 1932; Psyllia acaciaebaileyanae (Froggatt, 1901); Psyllia uncata Ferris & Klyver, 1932

= Acizzia acaciaebaileyanae =

Species of true bug

Acizzia acaciaebaileyanae is a psyllid common on Acacia baileyana, a popular garden specimen. They have also been associated with Acacia podalyriifolia. The psyllid and its host plant are native to Australia, but both are now widespread where the plant has been introduced including New Zealand, South Africa, Italy, and California, USA. The psyllid can reproduce to very high numbers, but appears not to damage the plant.

== Gallery ==
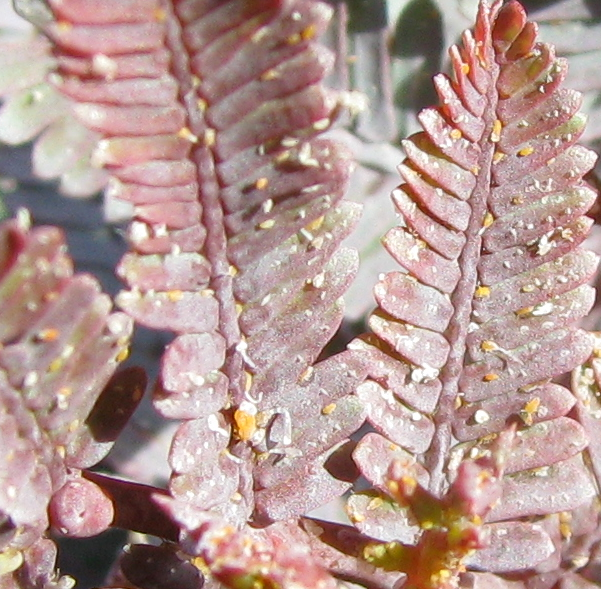
Nymphs, note sugars being excreted

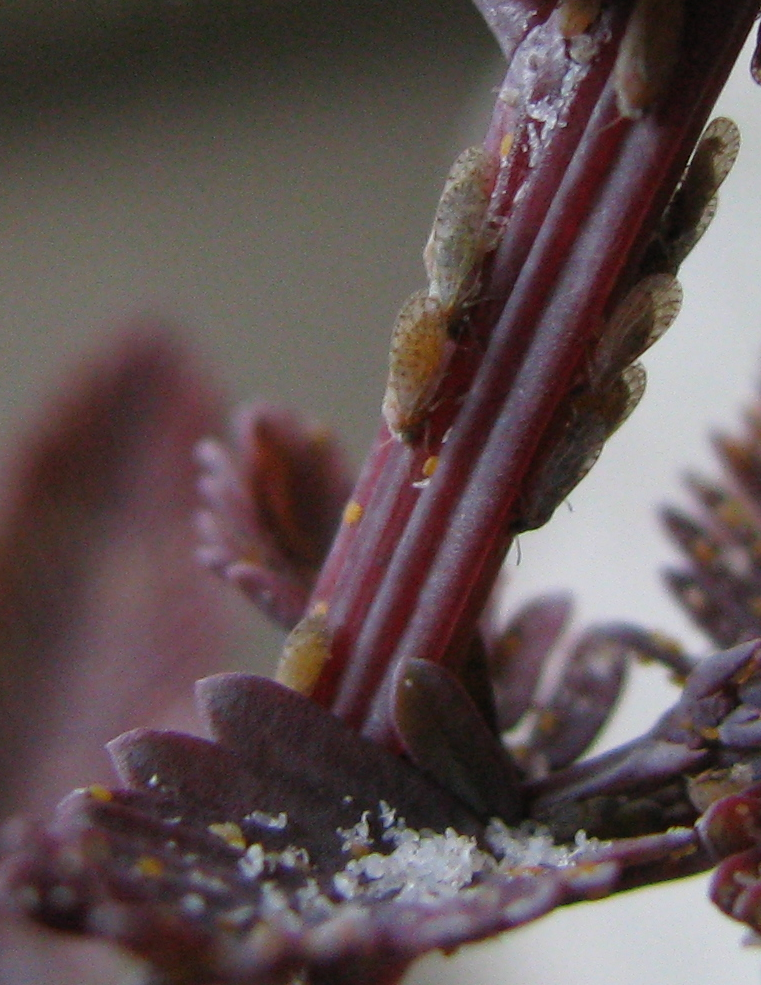
Adults, note sugars accumulating on leaf below
