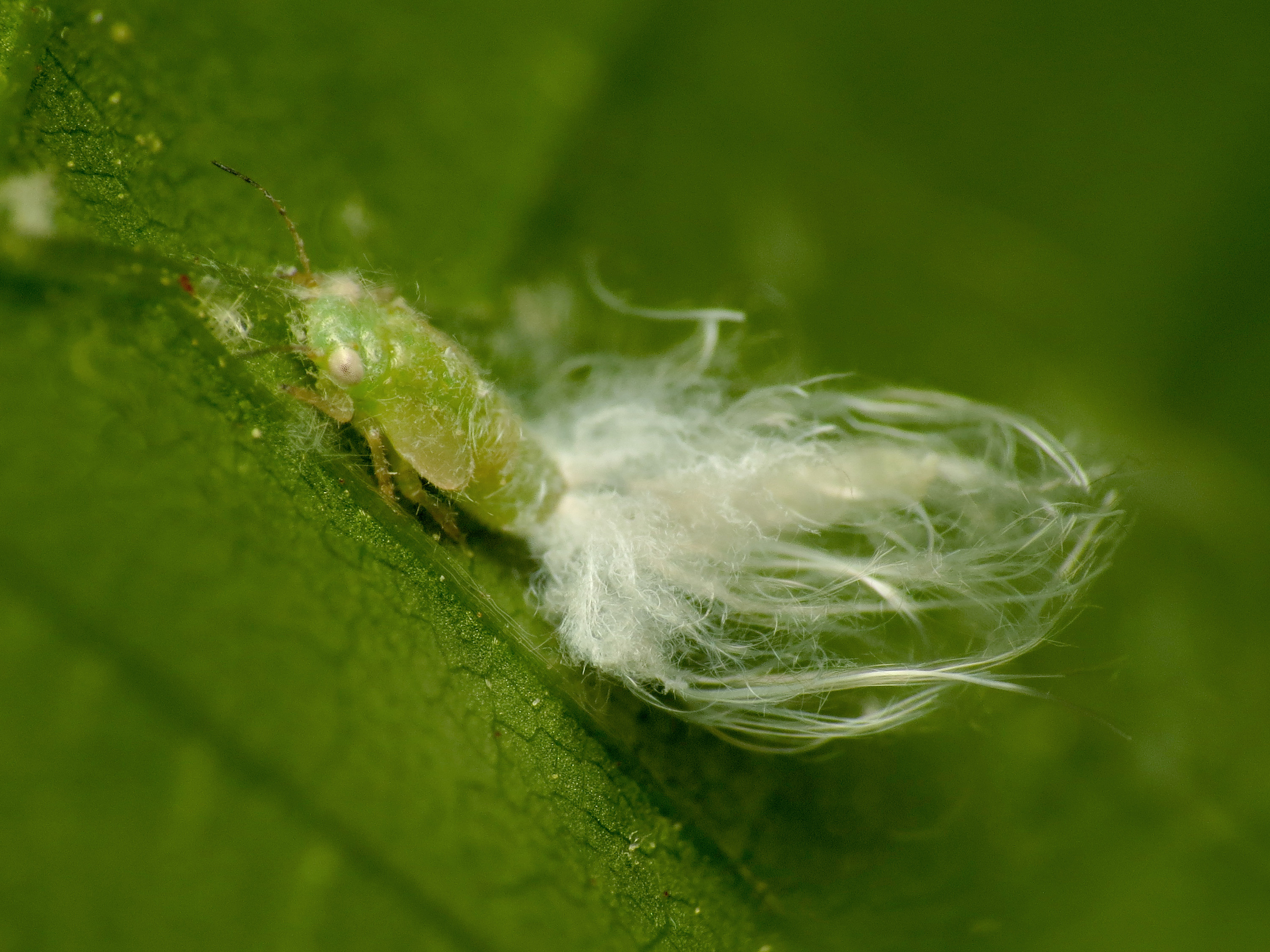

Scientific classification
- Domain: Eukaryota
- Kingdom: Animalia
- Phylum: Arthropoda
- Class: Insecta
- Order: Hemiptera
- Suborder: Sternorrhyncha
- Family: Psyllidae
- Genus: Psylla
- Species: P. carpinicola

Binomial name
- Psylla carpinicola Crawford, 1914

= Psylla carpinicola =

Species of true bug

Psylla carpinicola is a species of plant-parasitic hemipteran in the family Psyllidae.
