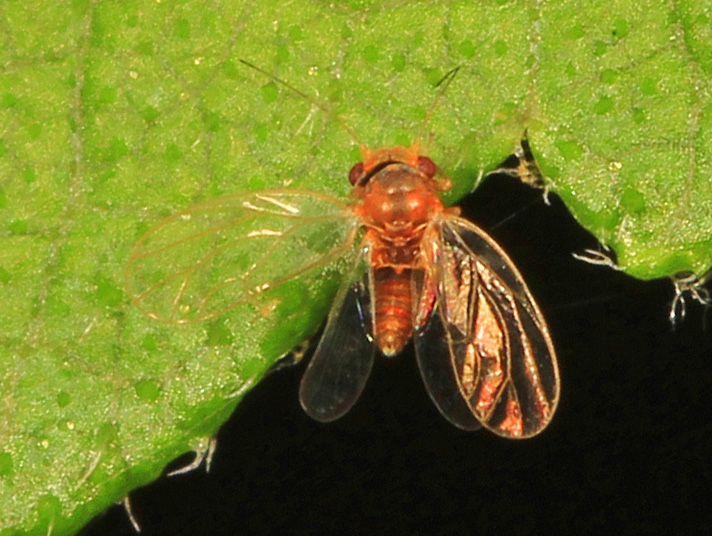

Scientific classification
- Domain: Eukaryota
- Kingdom: Animalia
- Phylum: Arthropoda
- Class: Insecta
- Order: Hemiptera
- Suborder: Sternorrhyncha
- Family: Psyllidae
- Genus: Heteropsylla
- Species: H. huasachae

Binomial name
- Heteropsylla huasachae Crawford, 1914

= Heteropsylla huasachae =

Species of true bug

Heteropsylla huasachae is a species of plant-parasitic hemipteran in the family Psyllidae.
