= Heteropsylla cubana =

Scientific classification
- Kingdom: Animalia
- Phylum: Arthropoda
- Clade: Pancrustacea
- Class: Insecta
- Order: Hemiptera
- Suborder: Sternorrhyncha
- Family: Psyllidae
- Genus: Heteropsylla
- Species: H. cubana

Binomial name
- Heteropsylla cubana Crawford, 1914

Synonyms
- Heteropsylla incisa (Šulc, 1914)

Species of true bug

Heteropsylla cubana, the leucaena psyllid, is a species of in the family Psyllidae. It is native to South and Central America and can cause harm to species of broadleaved trees, such as Albizia, Mimosa, Leucaena leucocephala and Samanea saman. It has also been found in Asia, on the islands of the South Pacific and in Africa. The insect feeds on the young leaves and shoots, and on the older parts, also the flowers. The twig tops die off, and in serious cases the whole tree can die after dropping all leaves.
