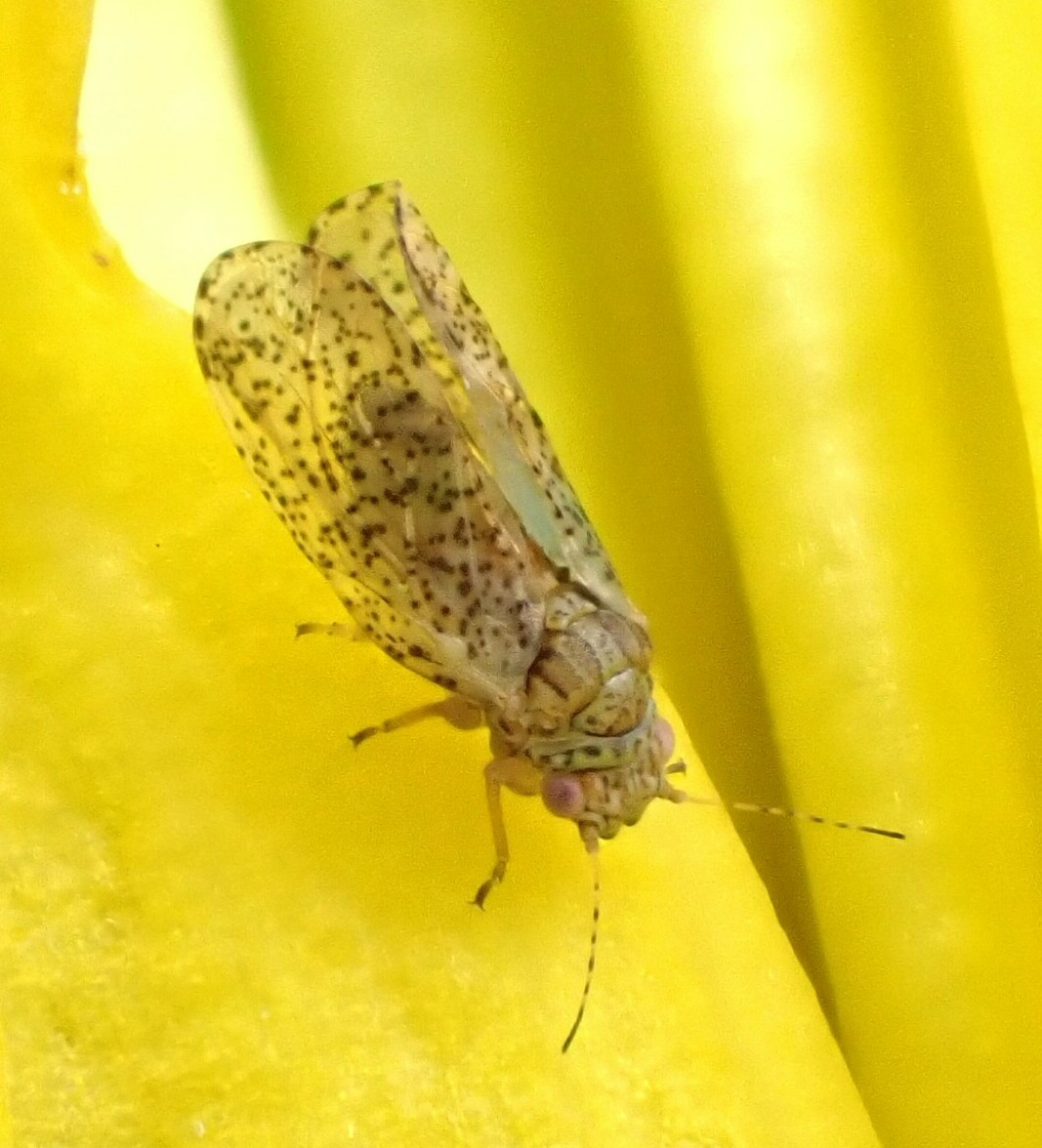
- Adult on kōwhai flower

Scientific classification
- Kingdom: Animalia
- Phylum: Arthropoda
- Class: Insecta
- Order: Hemiptera
- Suborder: Sternorrhyncha
- Family: Psyllidae
- Genus: Psylla
- Species: P. frodobagginsi

Binomial name
- Psylla frodobagginsi Martoni, 2019

= Psylla frodobagginsi =

New Zealand species of tree bug

Psylla frodobagginsi or the hobbit kōwhai psyllid is a species of psyllid, a plant-feeding hemipteran in the family Psyllidae. It is endemic to New Zealand and is found only on New Zealand kōwhai trees and is named after the character Frodo Baggins from The Lord of the Rings.

== Taxonomy ==
In 1932 Ferris and Klyver described the species Psylla apicalis, the first known psyllid feeding on Sophora, but noted that it varied widely in its wing patterns and coloration, to a degree consistent with two separate taxa—although the authors believed it was a single variable species.

A 2018 genetic analysis of New Zealand Psylla suggested there could be five undescribed species in the genus, including potentially two found on South Island Sophora microphylla.

P. frodobagginsi was described by Francesco Martoni in a 2019 paper by Martoni and Karen Armstrong, during research for Martoni's 2017 Lincoln University PhD thesis, supervised by Armstrong. Specimens were collected from S. microphylla (the most common kōwhai species) in 21 locations around the South Island. The holotype specimen, collected at the Oamaru Public Gardens, is held at the Lincoln University Entomology Research Collection, with additional paratypes in the National Arthropod Collection.

The name frodobagginsi refers to the character Frodo Baggins in The Lord of the Rings, a hobbit and thus smaller than most of the other characters; P. frodobagginsi is smaller than its relative P. apicialis. Much of the cinema trilogy The Lord of the Rings was shot in the South Island, where this species is found.

== Distribution ==
This species is endemic to New Zealand and has only been observed in the South Island.

== Description ==
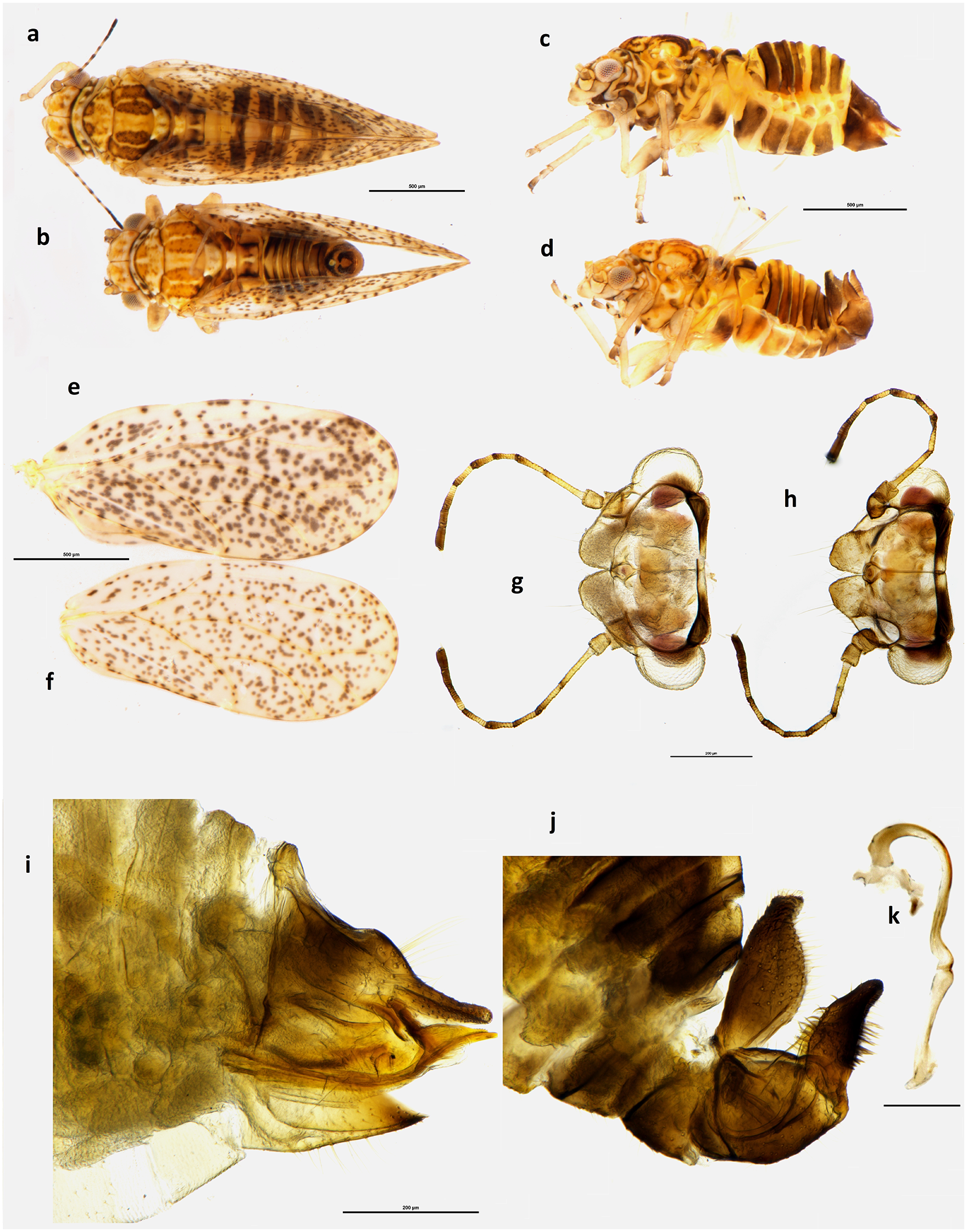
Male and female Psylla frodobagginsi from the 2019 description

P. frodobagginsi is smaller than its close relative, P. apicalis, lighter coloured, and has spotted wings. Males are as small as 1.24 mm (0.049 in).

== Biology ==
It is monophagous on kōwhai trees (Sophora microphylla).
