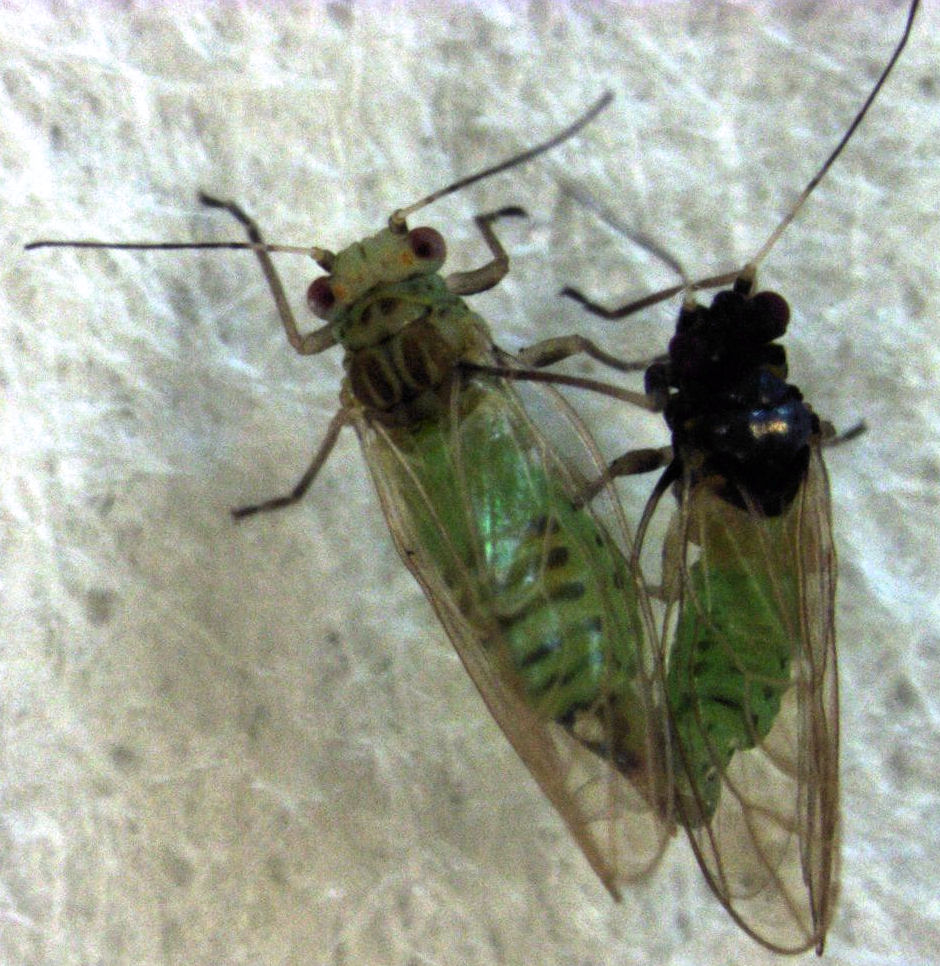

Scientific classification
- Kingdom: Animalia
- Phylum: Arthropoda
- Class: Insecta
- Order: Hemiptera
- Suborder: Sternorrhyncha
- Family: Psyllidae
- Genus: Acizzia
- Species: A. solanicola

Binomial name
- Acizzia solanicola Kent & Taylor, 2010

= Acizzia solanicola =

Species of true bug

Acizzia solanicola, commonly known as the Australian solanum psyllid, is a psyllid from Australia, found on plants of the genus Solanum. It has subsequently been found also in New Zealand.
