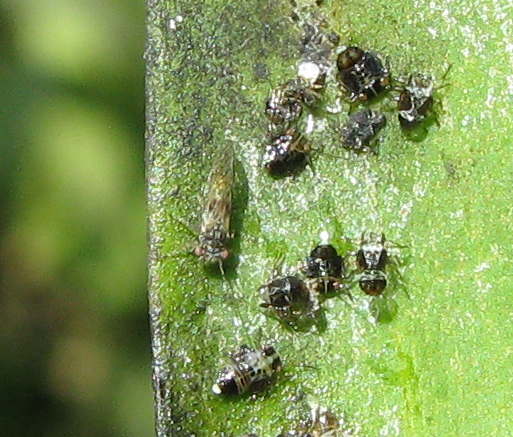
- Acizzia uncatoides adults and nymphs showing sugars and sooty mould

Scientific classification
- Domain: Eukaryota
- Kingdom: Animalia
- Phylum: Arthropoda
- Class: Insecta
- Order: Hemiptera
- Suborder: Sternorrhyncha
- Family: Psyllidae
- Genus: Acizzia
- Species: A. uncatoides

Binomial name
- Acizzia uncatoides (Ferris & Klyver, 1932)

Synonyms
- Neopsylla uncatoides (Ferris & Klyver, 1932); Psylla uncatoides Ferris & Klyver, 1932; Psylla unctatoides Ferris & Klyver, 1932; Psyllia uncatoides Ferris & Klyver, 1932

= Acizzia uncatoides =

Species of true bug

Acizzia uncatoides is a species of psyllid native to Australia where it feeds primarily on Acacia (especially Acacia melanoxylon) and some Albizia species. It is present in many parts of the world where it infests these plant species, presumably introduced with the plants. It is not generally regarded as a pest species although it can proliferate to high numbers. Generalist psyllid predators also feed on this species.
