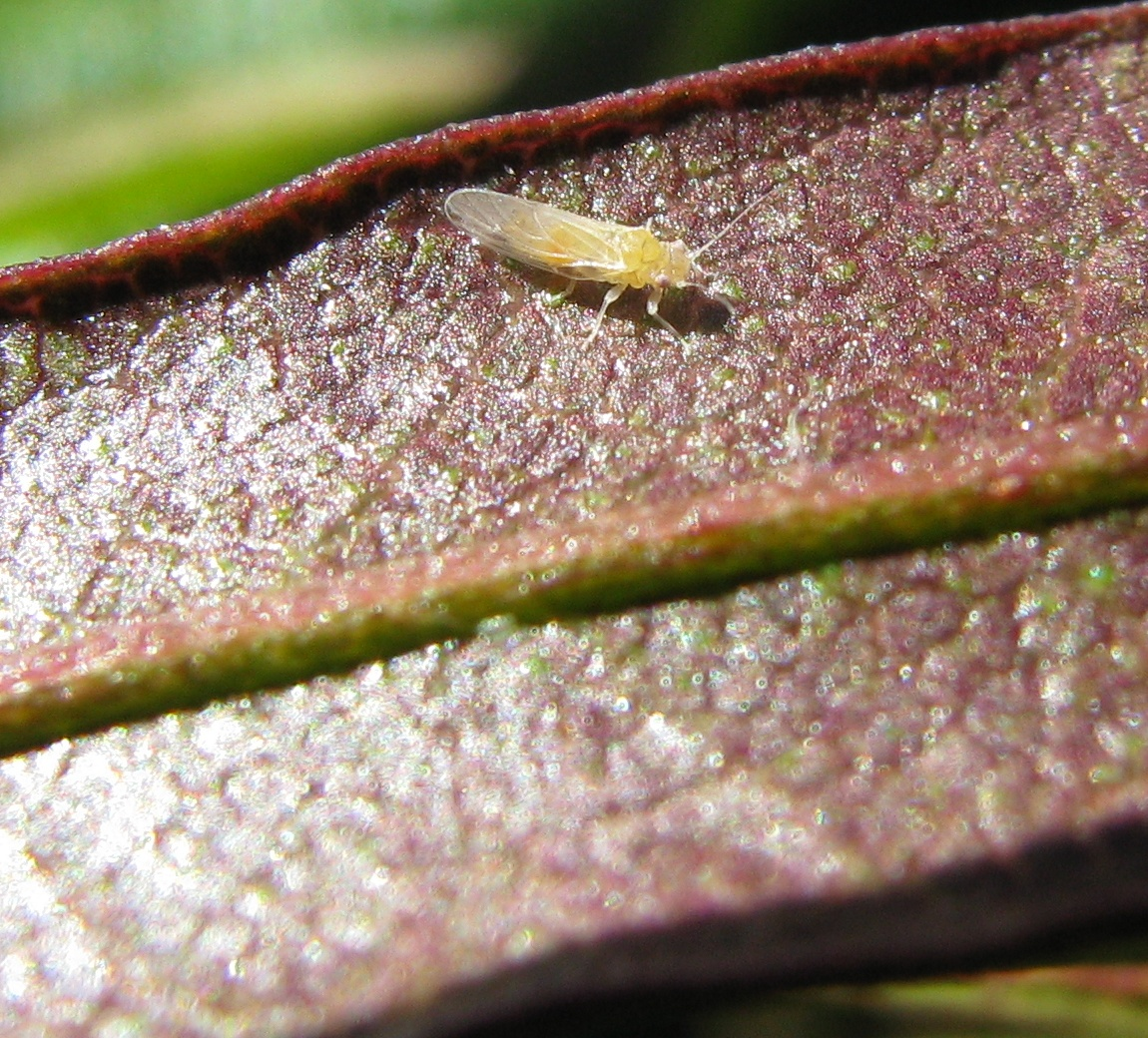

Scientific classification
- Kingdom: Animalia
- Phylum: Arthropoda
- Class: Insecta
- Order: Hemiptera
- Suborder: Sternorrhyncha
- Family: Psyllidae
- Genus: Acizzia
- Species: A. dodonaeae

Binomial name
- Acizzia dodonaeae (Tuthill, 1952)

Synonyms
- Psylla dodonaeae Tuthill, 1952

= Acizzia dodonaeae =

Species of true bug

Acizzia dodonaeae is a psyllid common on Dodonaea viscosa.

== Distribution ==
A. dodonaeae is endemic to the Australian Alps, Tasmania, and New Zealand.

== Description ==
The adult, with wings folded, is 2.25–2.75 millimetres long. The head and thorax are white to pale buff coloured, and the abdomen is green.

== Gallery ==
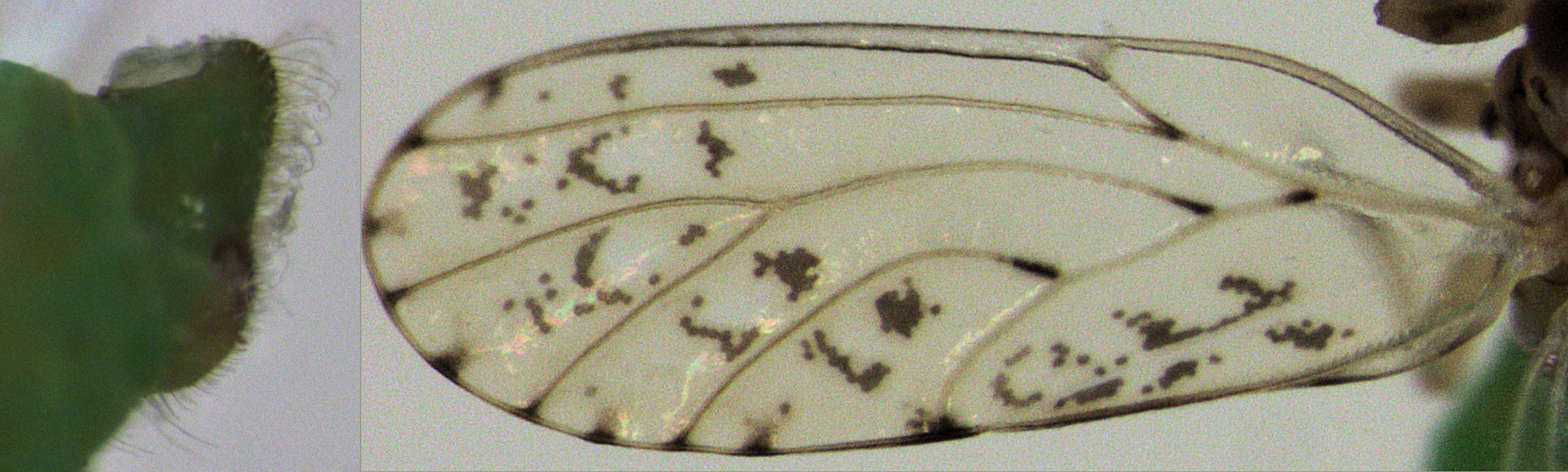
Female cauda (left) and forewing (right, length about 2.4 mm)

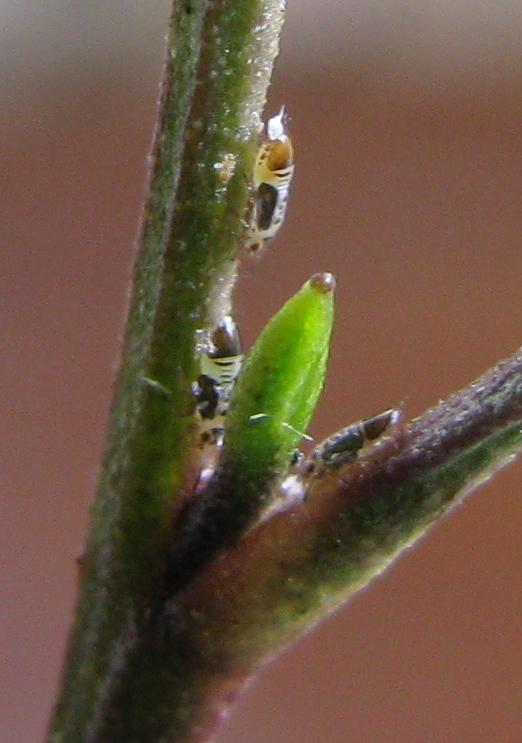
Nymphs; note sugars being excreted
