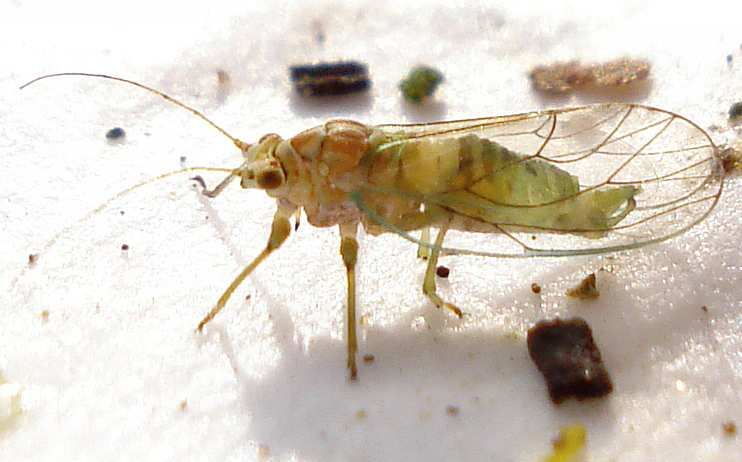
- Psylla alni

Scientific classification
- Kingdom: Animalia
- Phylum: Arthropoda
- Class: Insecta
- Order: Hemiptera
- Suborder: Sternorrhyncha
- Family: Psyllidae
- Subfamily: Psyllinae
- Genus: Psylla; Geoffroy, 1762

Diversity
- at least 110 species

Synonyms
- Asphagis Enderlein, 1921; Baeopelma syn. nov.; Chamaepsylla syn. nov.; Psylla (Labyrinthopsylla) syn. nov.

= Psylla =

Genus of true bugs

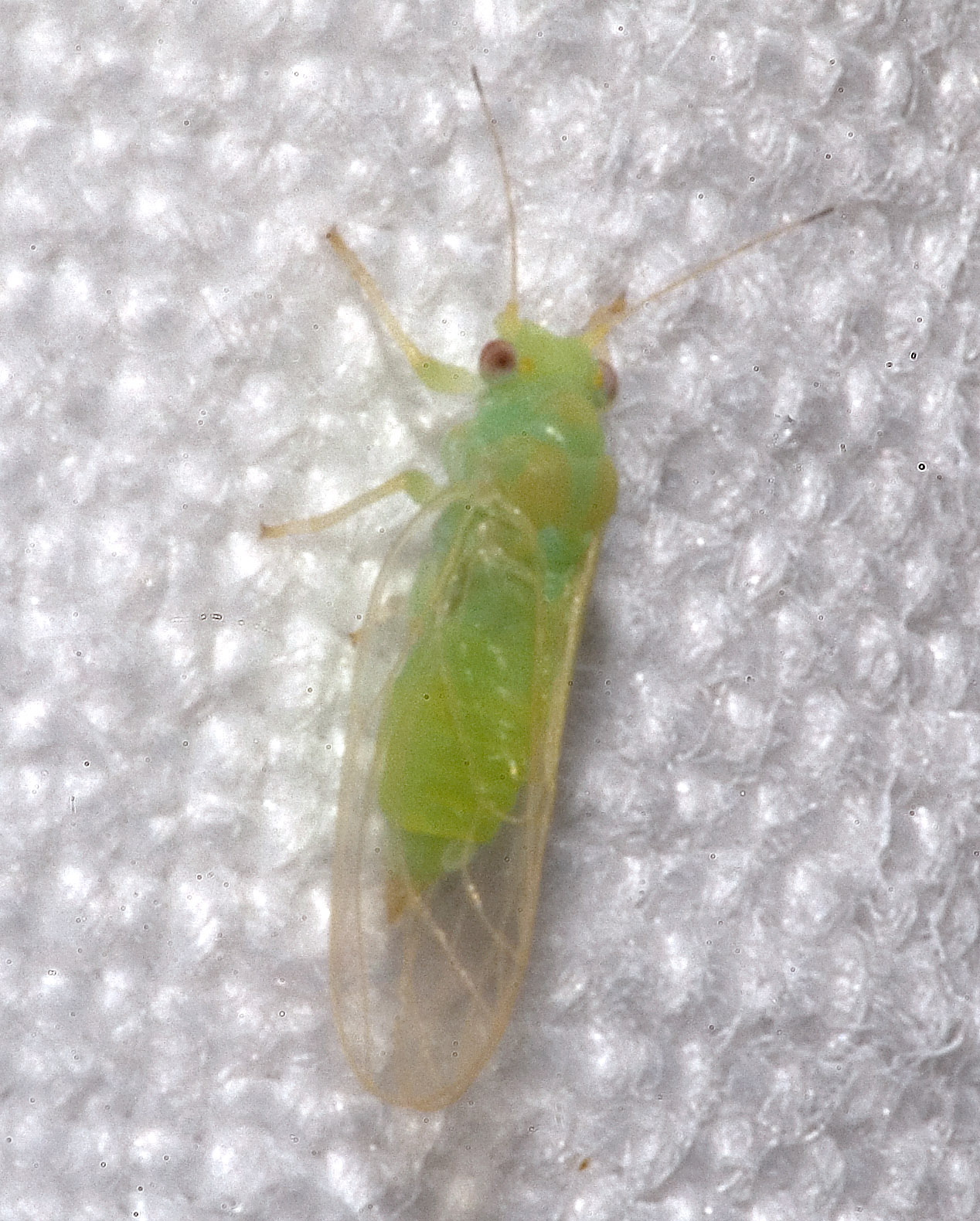

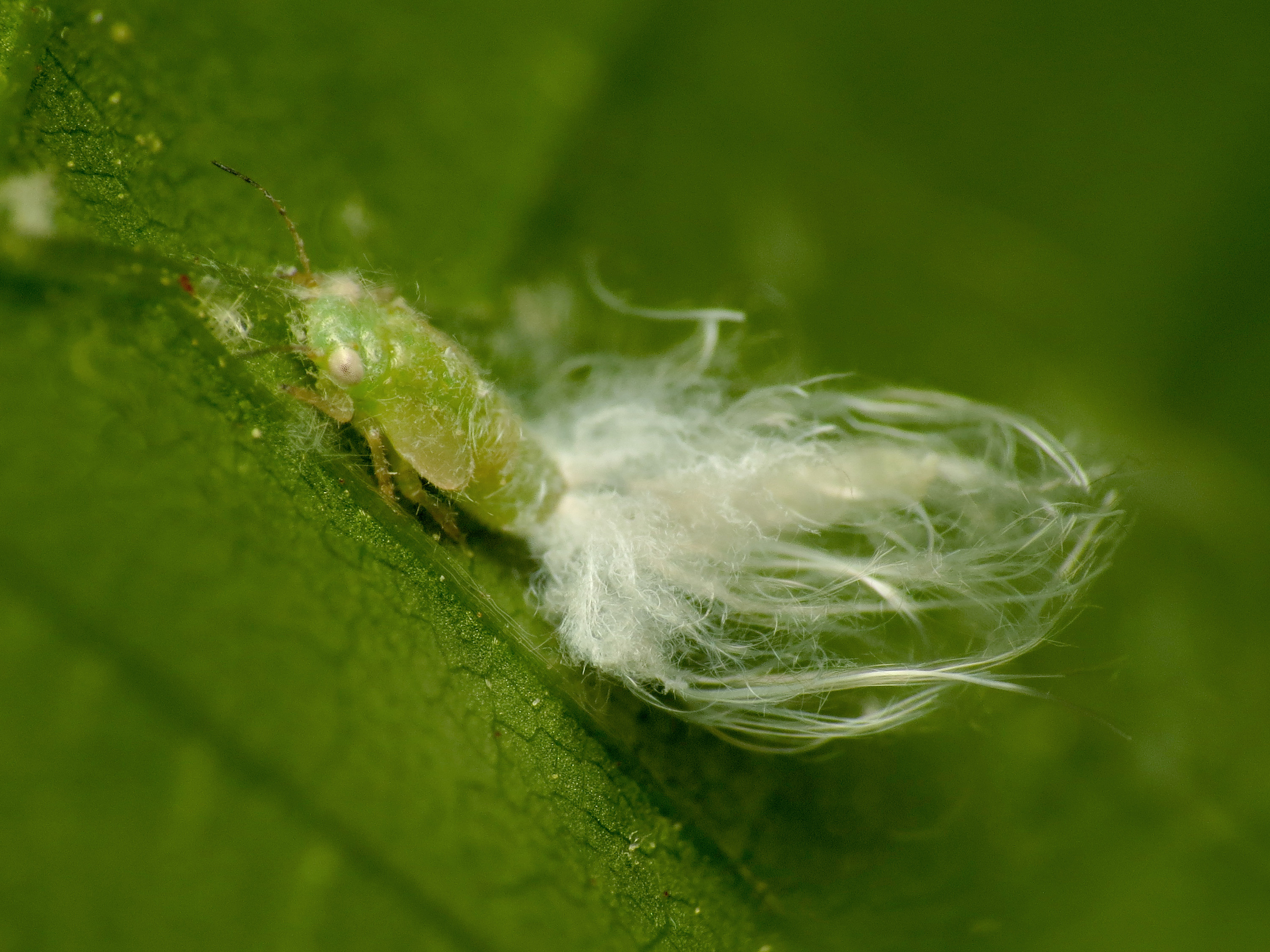
Psylla carpinicola

Psylla (from the Greek psulla, meaning flea) is the type genus of sap-sucking insects in the family Psyllidae. There are at least 110 described species in Psylla. Species within the genus feed on various host plants.

Some agricultural pests, previously placed here, are now in related genera, such as Cacopsylla (which includes at least two species harmful to fruit trees); other revised species names include the "Albizia fly" (Acizzia jamatonica, in the same family) and the laurel fly (Trioza alacris in the family Triozidae).

== Selected species and hosts ==
- Psylla alni feeds on alders: this is the type species (as Chermes alni Linnaeus, 1758)
- Psylla apicalis feeds on kōwhai trees
- Psylla betulae feeds on birches
- Psylla buxi feeds on box (Buxus species)
- Psylla cordata feeds on limes (Tilia species)
- Psylla frodobagginsi feeds on kōwhai trees
- Psylla oblonga feeds on Albizia odoratissima

== See also ==
- List of Psylla species
