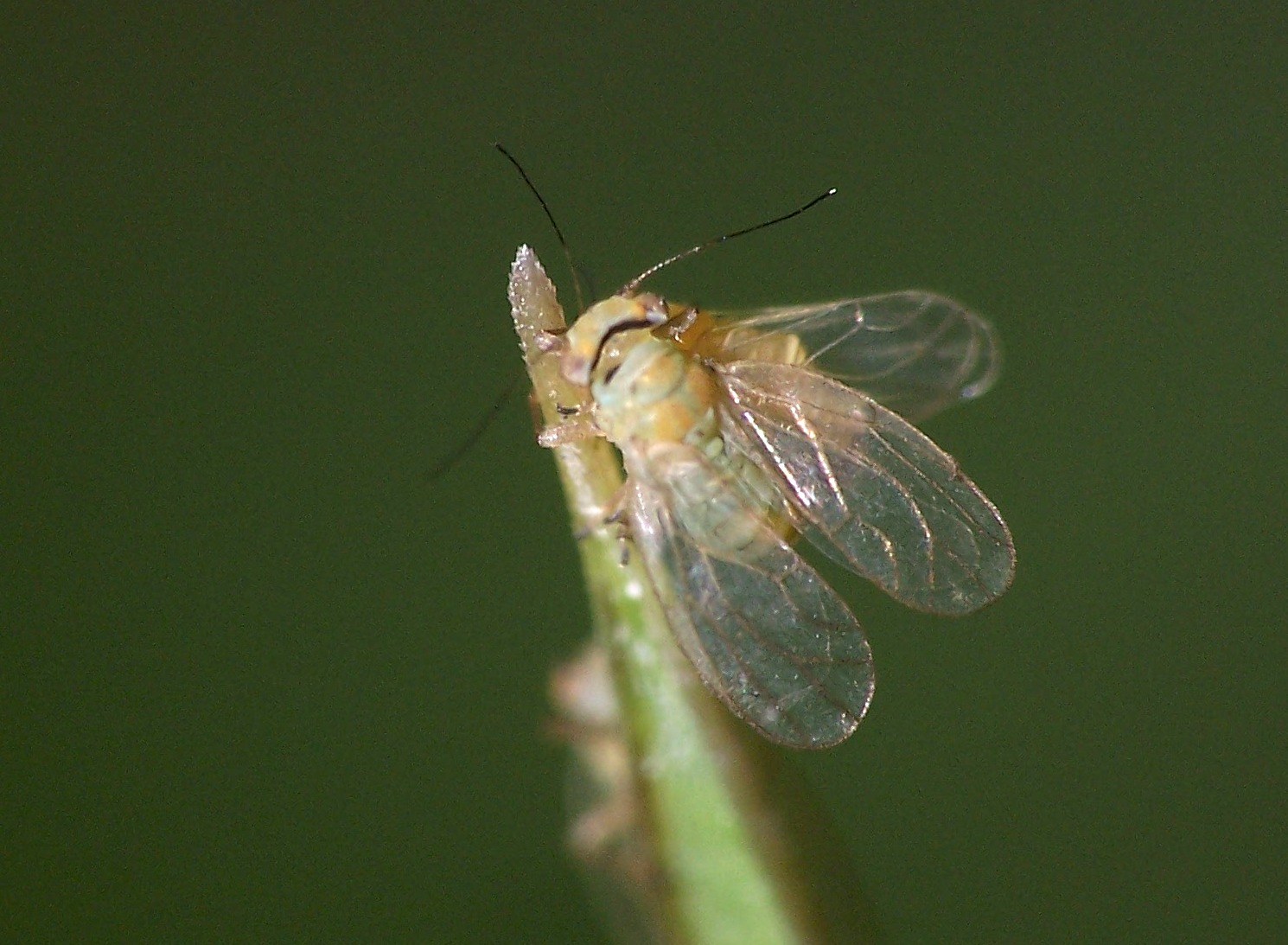

Scientific classification
- Domain: Eukaryota
- Kingdom: Animalia
- Phylum: Arthropoda
- Class: Insecta
- Order: Hemiptera
- Suborder: Sternorrhyncha
- Family: Psyllidae
- Subfamily: Ciriacreminae
- Genus: Heteropsylla; Crawford, 1914

= Heteropsylla =

Genus of true bugs

Heteropsylla is a genus of plant-parasitic hemipterans in the family Psyllidae. There are more than 40 described species in Heteropsylla.

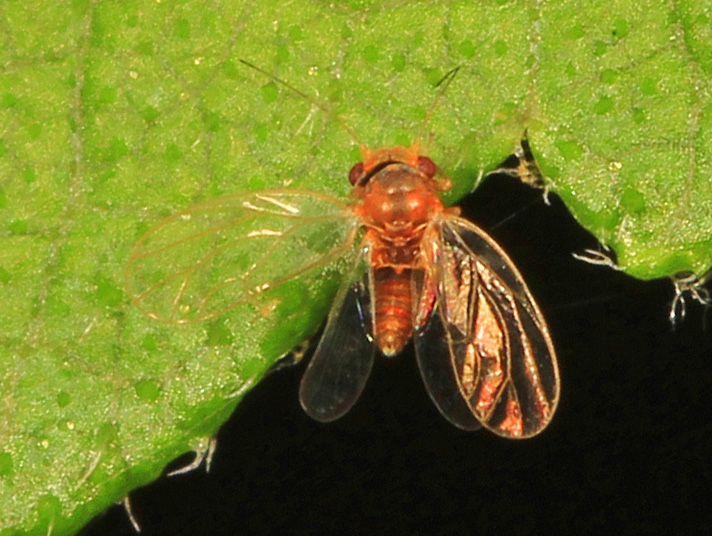

== Species ==
These 41 species belong to the genus Heteropsylla:

- Heteropsylla aurantiaca Muddiman, Hodkinson & Hollis, 1992
- Heteropsylla bidentata Muddiman, Hodkinson & Hollis, 1992
- Heteropsylla boquetensis (Brown & Hodkinson, 1988)
- Heteropsylla brevigenis Burckhardt, 1987
- Heteropsylla caldwelli Burckhardt, 1987
- Heteropsylla clavata Muddiman, Hodkinson & Hollis, 1992
- Heteropsylla crawfordi Enderlein, 1918
- Heteropsylla crenata Muddiman, Hodkinson & Hollis, 1992
- Heteropsylla cubana Crawford, 1914
- Heteropsylla curta Muddiman, Hodkinson & Hollis, 1992
- Heteropsylla didubiata Caldwell, 1944
- Heteropsylla distincta Tuthill, 1944
- Heteropsylla expansa Muddiman, Hodkinson & Hollis, 1992
- Heteropsylla flammula Muddiman, Hodkinson & Hollis, 1992
- Heteropsylla flexuosa Muddiman, Hodkinson & Hollis, 1992
- Heteropsylla forcipata Crawford, 1914
- Heteropsylla fusca Crawford, 1914
- Heteropsylla huasachae Crawford, 1914
- Heteropsylla intermedia Muddiman, Hodkinson & Hollis, 1992
- Heteropsylla maculosa Muddiman, Hodkinson & Hollis, 1992
- Heteropsylla mexica Crawford
- Heteropsylla mexicana Crawford, 1914
- Heteropsylla mimosae Crawford, 1914
- Heteropsylla muricata Muddiman, Hodkinson & Hollis, 1992
- Heteropsylla nebulosa Muddiman, Hodkinson & Hollis, 1992
- Heteropsylla obscura Muddiman, Hodkinson & Hollis, 1992
- Heteropsylla procera Muddiman, Hodkinson & Hollis, 1992
- Heteropsylla propinqua Muddiman, Hodkinson & Hollis, 1992
- Heteropsylla proximata Muddiman, Hodkinson & Hollis, 1992
- Heteropsylla puertoricoensis Caldwell, 1942
- Heteropsylla pulchella Hodkinson & Muddiman, 1993
- Heteropsylla pulchra Tuthill, 1964
- Heteropsylla quassiae Crawford, 1914
- Heteropsylla reducta Caldwell & Martorell, 1952
- Heteropsylla setosa Muddiman, Hodkinson & Hollis, 1992
- Heteropsylla spinulosa Muddiman, Hodkinson & Hollis, 1992
- Heteropsylla tenuata Muddiman, Hodkinson & Hollis, 1992
- Heteropsylla texana Crawford, 1914 (mesquite psyllid)
- Heteropsylla truncata Muddiman, Hodkinson & Hollis, 1992
- Heteropsylla tuthilli Burckhardt, 1987
- Heteropsylla virgulata Muddiman, Hodkinson & Hollis, 1992
