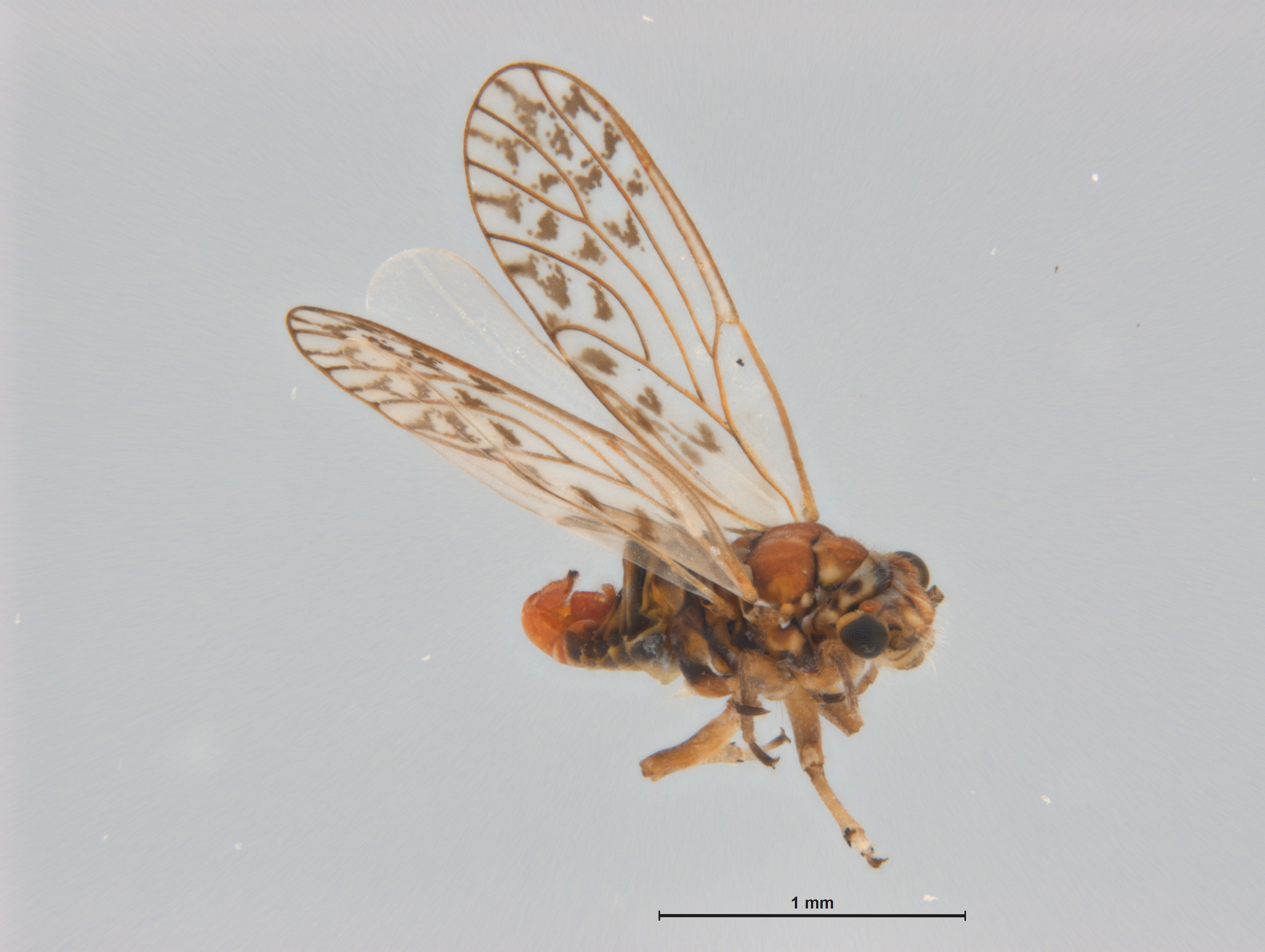
- Acizzia acaciae

Scientific classification
- Domain: Eukaryota
- Kingdom: Animalia
- Phylum: Arthropoda
- Class: Insecta
- Order: Hemiptera
- Suborder: Sternorrhyncha
- Family: Psyllidae
- Subfamily: Acizziinae; White & Hodkinson, 1985
- Genus: Acizzia; Heslop-Harrison, 1961

Synonyms
- Neopsylla Harrison, 1949

= Acizzia =

Genus of true bugs

Acizzia is a genus of psyllids belonging to the monotypic subfamily Acizziinae, with a worldwide distribution; it was erected by George Heslop-Harrison in 1961.

Species primarily feed on Acacia and Albizia species in Australia and have become widespread as their host plants are popular garden specimens. Damage to the leaves is generally mild, but economic damage on plantation species is occasionally reported. Species are monophagous or oligophagous, for example:

- Acizzia acaciaebaileyanae is common on Acacia baileyana,
- Acizzia dodonaeae feeds on Dodonaea viscosa,
- Acizzia jamatonica feeds on Albizia julibrissin,
- Acizzia solanicola feeds on the genus Solanum,
- Acizzia uncatoides feeds on Acacia melanoxylon and some Albizia species.

== Species ==
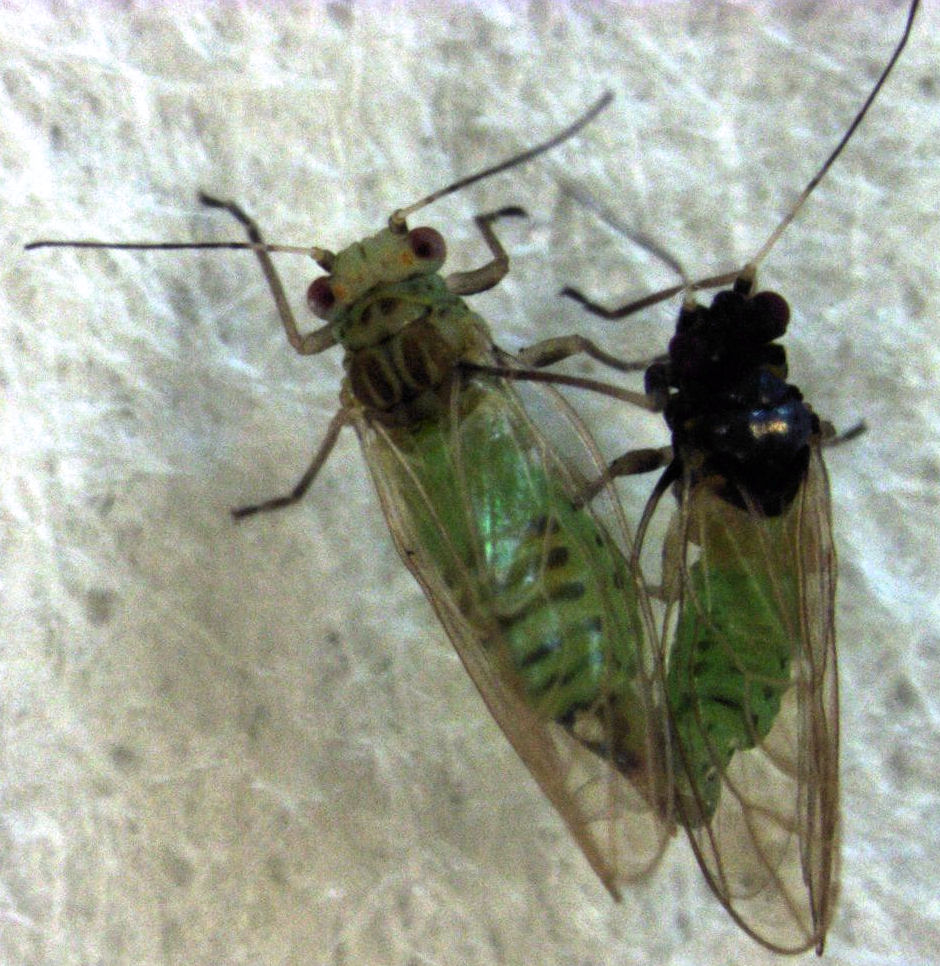
Acizzia solanicola

The Global Biodiversity Information Facility includes:

1. Acizzia acaciae (Maskell, 1894) - type species (as Psylla acaciae Maskell)
2. Acizzia acaciaebaileyanae (Froggatt, 1901)
3. Acizzia acaciaedealbatae (Froggatt, 1903)
4. Acizzia acaciaedecurrentis (Froggatt, 1901)
5. Acizzia acaciaejuniperinae (Froggatt, 1903)
6. Acizzia acaciaependulae (Froggatt, 1901)
7. Acizzia acaciaepycnanthae (Froggatt, 1901)
8. Acizzia albizziae (Ferris & Klyver, 1932)
9. Acizzia albizzialis (Li, 2011)
10. Acizzia albizzicola Li & Yang, 1992
11. Acizzia alternata Kent & Taylor, 2010
12. Acizzia amyemae Taylor, 1999
13. Acizzia apicalis (Ferris & Klyver, 1932)
14. Acizzia beieri Loginova, 1967
15. Acizzia bicavata Li & Yang, 1992
16. Acizzia bicolorata (Samy, 1972)
17. Acizzia bona Loginova, 1967
18. Acizzia cajanae (Braza & Calilung, 1981)
19. Acizzia candida (Froggatt, 1901)
20. Acizzia capparis (Froggatt, 1901)
21. Acizzia carmichaeliae Tuthill, 1952
22. Acizzia casuarinae Taylor, 2017
23. Acizzia chebalingana Li, 1993
24. Acizzia complana Li & Yang, 1992
25. Acizzia conspicua (Tuthill, 1952)
26. Acizzia convector Burckhardt & Taylor, 2023
27. Acizzia credoensis Taylor & Kent, 2013
28. Acizzia dalbergiae (Li, 2011)
29. Acizzia dalbergicola Li, 2011
30. Acizzia dealbotae Li & Yang, 1992
31. Acizzia didyma Burckhardt & Mifsud, 1998
32. Acizzia dodonaeae (Tuthill, 1952)
33. Acizzia ehretioides Li, 2011
34. Acizzia ensifolia Li, 2011
35. Acizzia errabunda Martoni & Armstrong, 2019
36. Acizzia exculta Burckhardt & Van Harten, 2006
37. Acizzia exquisita (Tuthill, 1952)
38. Acizzia frenchi (Froggatt, 1901)
39. Acizzia gracilis (Froggatt, 1903)
40. Acizzia hakeae (Tuthill, 1952)
41. Acizzia halperini Burckhardt & Mifsud, 1998
42. Acizzia hirsuticauda Burckhardt & Mifsud, 1998
43. Acizzia hollisi Burckhardt, 1981
44. Acizzia huangi (Li, 2011)
45. Acizzia hughesae Taylor & Moir, 2014
46. Acizzia immaculata Heslop-Harrison, 1961
47. Acizzia indica (Heslop-Harrison, 1949)
48. Acizzia jamatonica (Kuwayama, 1908)
49. Acizzia jucunda (Tuthill, 1952)
50. Acizzia kalkorae (Li, 2011)
51. Acizzia karrooensis (Pettey, 1933)
52. Acizzia keithi Taylor & Moir, 2009
53. Acizzia lanceolatae Taylor, 2017
54. Acizzia lemurica (Šulc, 1908)
55. Acizzia lidgetti (Maskell, 1898)
56. Acizzia loranthacae Taylor, 1999
57. Acizzia maculata Taylor, 2017
58. Acizzia marginata Burckhardt, 1986
59. Acizzia mccarthyi Taylor & Moir, 2014
60. Acizzia melanocephala Burckhardt & Mifsud, 1998
61. Acizzia miraculosa Taylor, 2017
62. Acizzia nestor Taylor, 2017
63. Acizzia novaeguineae Taylor, 2017
64. Acizzia obscura (Crawford, 1912)
65. Acizzia pendulae Taylor, 1999
66. Acizzia preissiae Taylor, 2017
67. Acizzia quandang Taylor, 2017
68. Acizzia russellae Webb & Moran, 1974
69. Acizzia sasakii (Miyatake, 1963)
70. Acizzia schizoneuroides (Froggatt, 1901)
71. Acizzia solanicola Kent & Taylor, 2010
72. Acizzia taylorii Klimaszewski, 1997
73. Acizzia uncatoides (Ferris & Klyver, 1932)
74. Acizzia unioniseta (Li, 2011)
75. Acizzia veski Taylor & Moir, 2009
76. Acizzia virgata Burckhardt & Mifsud, 1998
77. Acizzia wittmeri Burckhardt, 1981
78. Acizzia yeni Taylor, 2018
