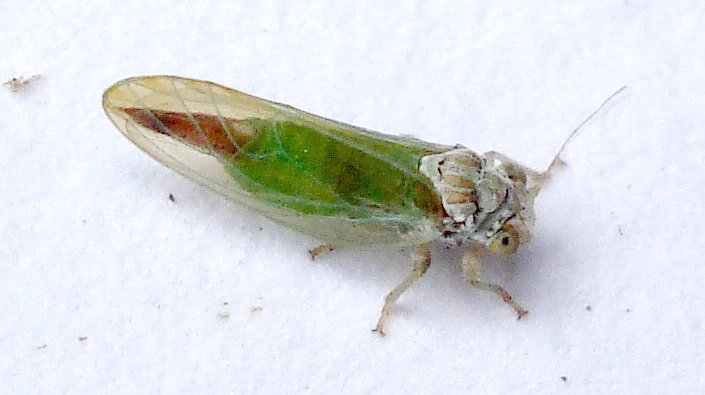

Scientific classification
- Kingdom: Animalia
- Phylum: Arthropoda
- Class: Insecta
- Order: Hemiptera
- Suborder: Sternorrhyncha
- Family: Psyllidae
- Genus: Psylla
- Species: P. buxi

Binomial name
- Psylla buxi (Linné, 1758)

Synonyms
- List: Psylla (Asphagidella) buxi (Linné, 1758); Chermes buxi Linné, 1758; Psyllia buxi (Linné, 1758); Asphagidella buxi (Linné, 1758)

= Psylla buxi =

Species of true bug

Psylla buxi, known generally as the boxwood psyllid or box sucker, is a species of plant-parasitic hemipteran in the family Psyllidae. It is native to Europe and introduced to North America.

The psyllid causes cabbage-like leaf clusters, known as galls at the tips of box shoots. The leaves are slightly thicker and strongly concave, and in the summer conceal many pale green nymphs, which are coated with white wax.

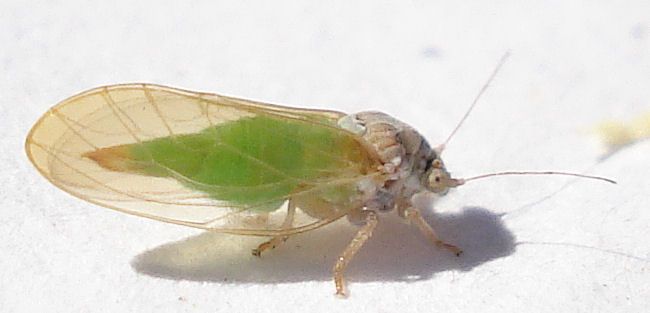
Boxwood psyllid, (Psylla buxi)

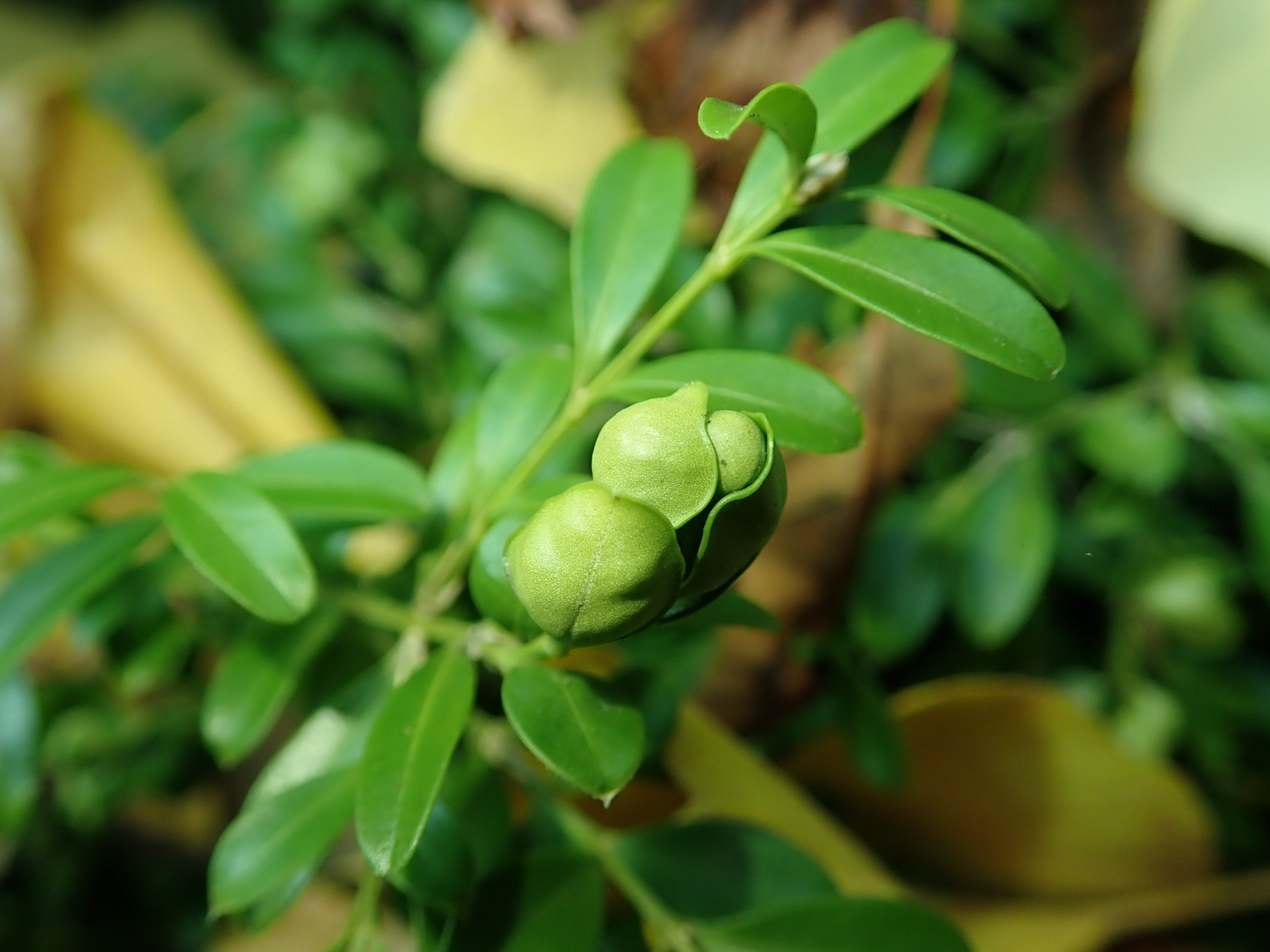
Galls on common box
