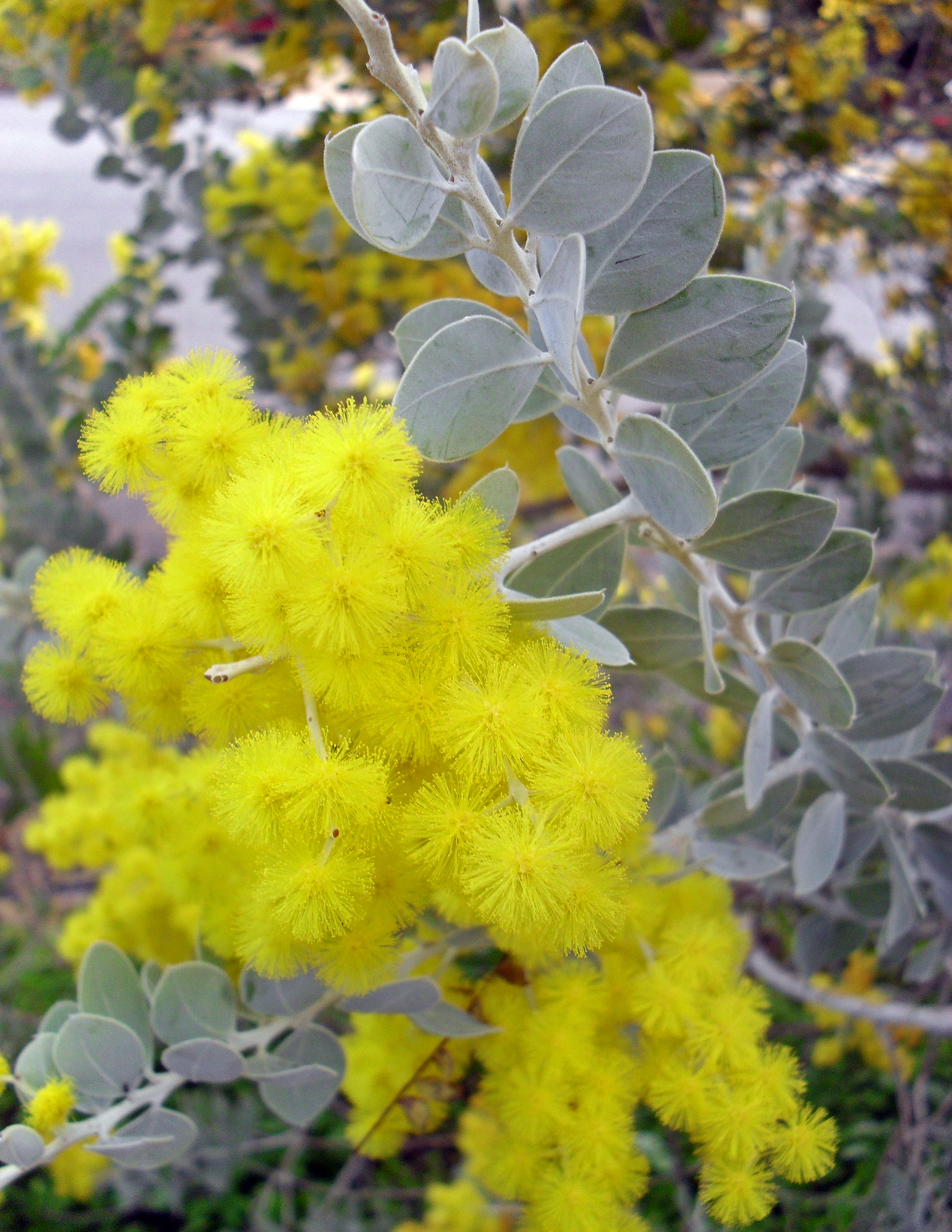

Scientific classification
- Kingdom: Plantae
- Clade: Tracheophytes
- Clade: Angiosperms
- Clade: Eudicots
- Clade: Rosids
- Order: Fabales
- Family: Fabaceae
- Subfamily: Caesalpinioideae
- Clade: Mimosoid clade
- Genus: Acacia
- Species: A. podalyriifolia

Binomial name
- Acacia podalyriifolia A.Cunn. ex G.Don, 1832
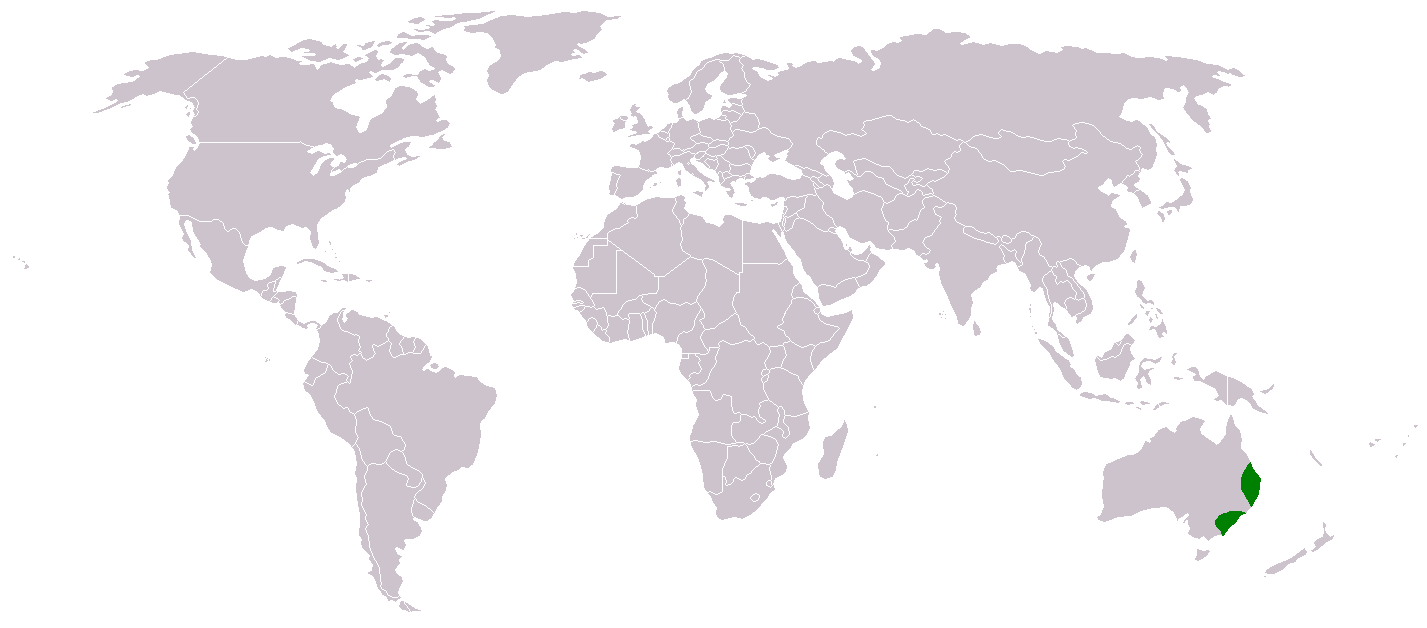
- Range of Acacia podalyriifolia

Synonyms
- Acacia fraseri Hook.; Acacia podalyriaefolia A.Cunn.; Acacia podalyriaefolia A.Cunn. var. viridis Guilf.; Acacia podalyriifolia Loudon; Acacia podalyriifolia G.Don var. typica Domin; Acacia podalyriifolia G.Don var. viridis Guilf.; Racosperma podalyriifolia (G.Don) Pedley; Racosperma podalyriifolium (G.Don) Pedley

= Acacia podalyriifolia =

Species of legume

Acacia podalyriifolia is a perennial tree which is fast-growing and widely cultivated. It is native to Australia but is also naturalised in Malaysia, Africa, India and South America. Its uses include environmental management and it is also used as an ornamental tree. It is very closely related to Acacia uncifera. It grows to about 5 m (16 feet) in height and about the same in total width. It blooms during winter.

Common names for it are Mount Morgan wattle, Queensland silver wattle, Queensland wattle, pearl acacia, pearl wattle and silver wattle.

== Description ==
Acacia podalyriifolia is a tall shrub or small tree that typically reaches a height and width of around 2 to 6 m (6 ft 7 in to 19 ft 8 in). Like most species of Acacia, it has phyllodes rather than true leaves. It has grey, smooth or finely fissured bark with terete and hairy branchlets that are often covered with a fine, white powdery coating. The silver-grey to grey-green phyllodes have a broadly elliptic to ovate shape and a length of 2 to 5 cm (0.8 to 2.0 in) and a width of 10 to 25 mm (0.4 to 1.0 in). They have hairs on margins and a prominent midvein. A. podalyriifolia blooms throughout the year producing simple inflorescences in groups of 8 to 22 along an axillary raceme with an axis length of 2 to 11 cm (0.8 to 4.3 in). The spherical flower heads have a diameter of 5 to 8 mm (0.2 to 0.3 in) and contain 15 to 30 bright golden flowers.

== Taxonomy ==
The species was first formally described by the botanist George Don in 1832 as part of the work General History of Dichlamydeous Plants. It was reclassified as Racosperma podalyriifolium by Leslie Pedley in 1987 then transferred back to genus Acacia in 2014. Other synonyms include Acacia podalyrifolia.

== Distribution ==
In Australia it is endemic to parts of southeastern Queensland and the northeast of New South Wales in areas to the north of Legume, but has become naturalised further south, where it is found in open woodland or forest communities. It has also become naturalized in Western Australia and South Australia.

Outside of Australia, it is naturalized in southern and eastern Africa, some parts of the Indian Subcontinent and Southeast Asia, on some Indian Ocean islands, in New Zealand, Brazil, Argentina, and southwestern USA. Overall, it thrives in subtropical and tropical conditions and tolerates semiarid climates.

=== As a weed ===
Being fast to spread, it is considered an environmental weed in New South Wales, Victoria, Southern Australia, and Western Australia. It is relatively widespread in South Africa, where it is considered a "potential transformer" of natural vegetation due to the possibility of it replacing indigenous vegetation.

== Gallery ==
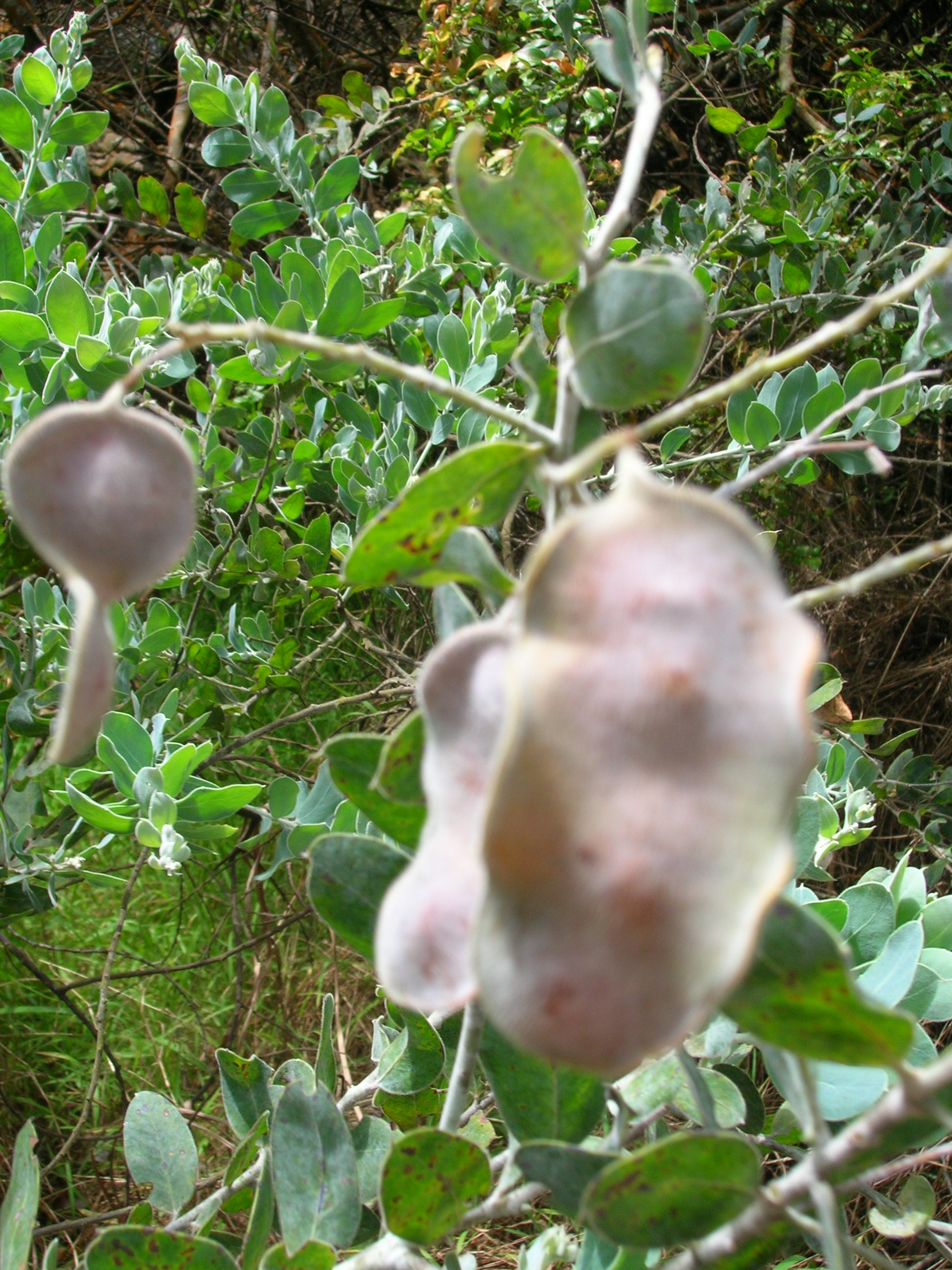
Acacia podalyriifolia seedpods

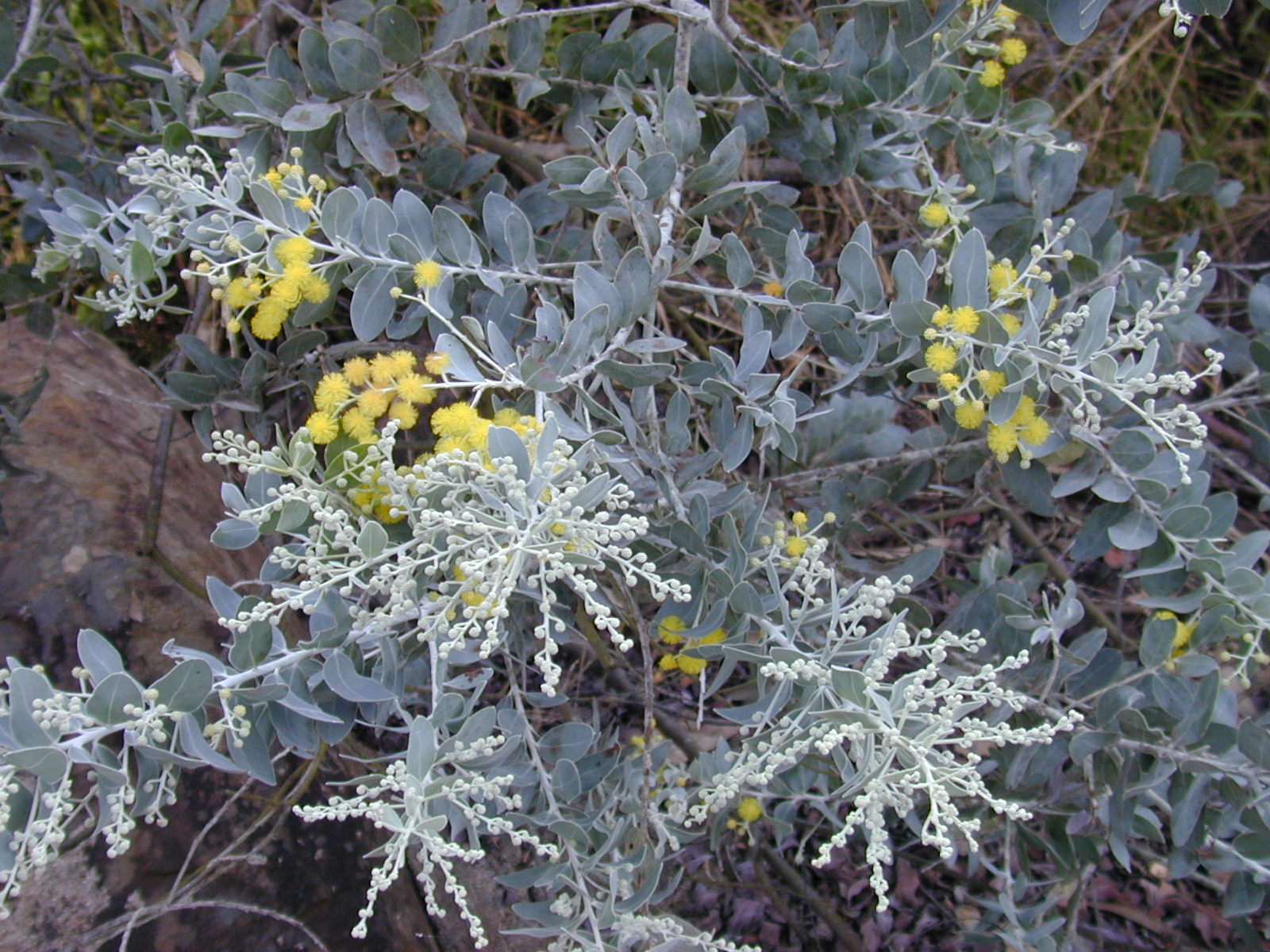
Foliage

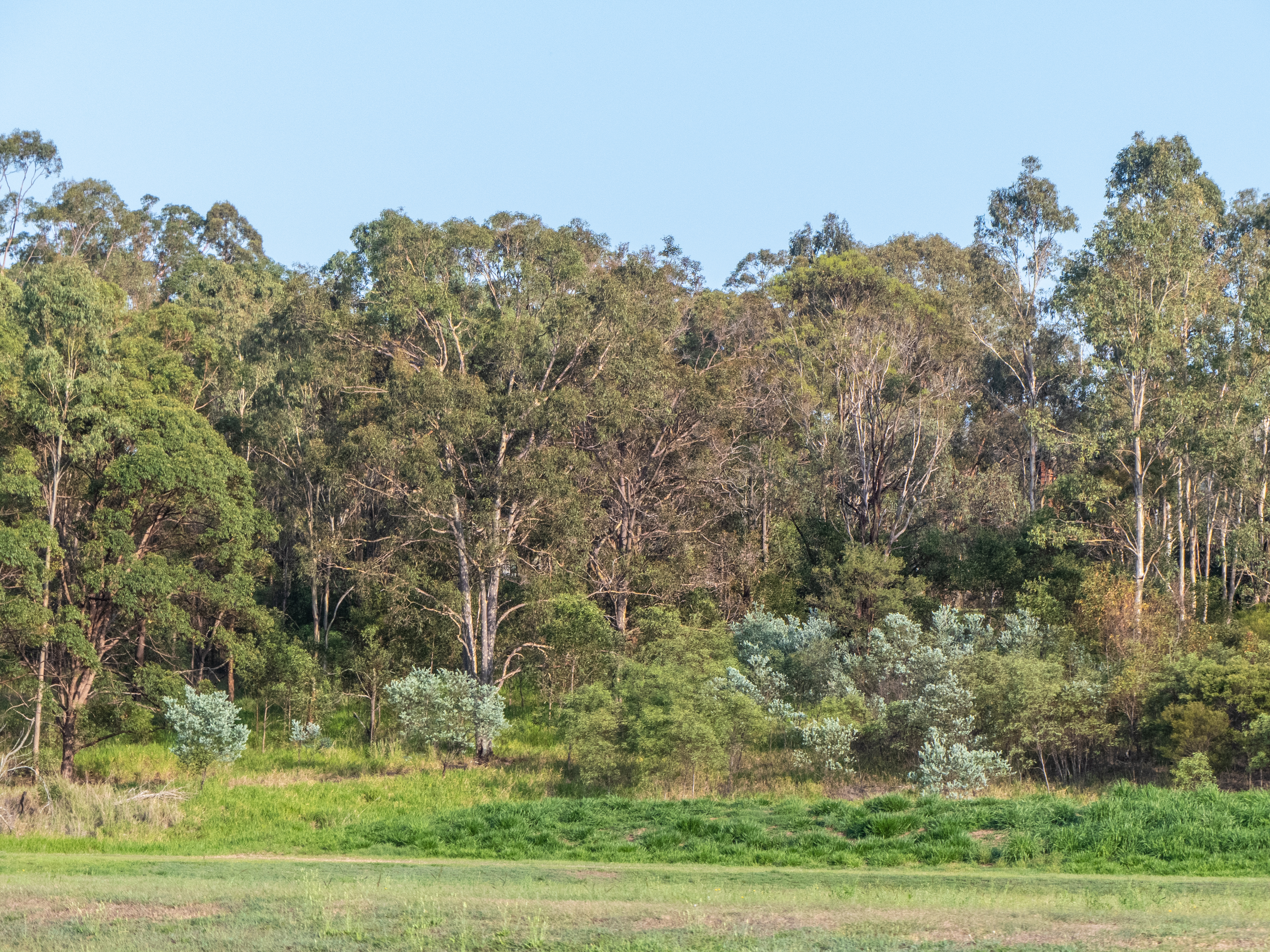
A. podalyriifolia is conspicuous by its glaucous foliage, 7th Brigade Park, Chermside, Queensland.

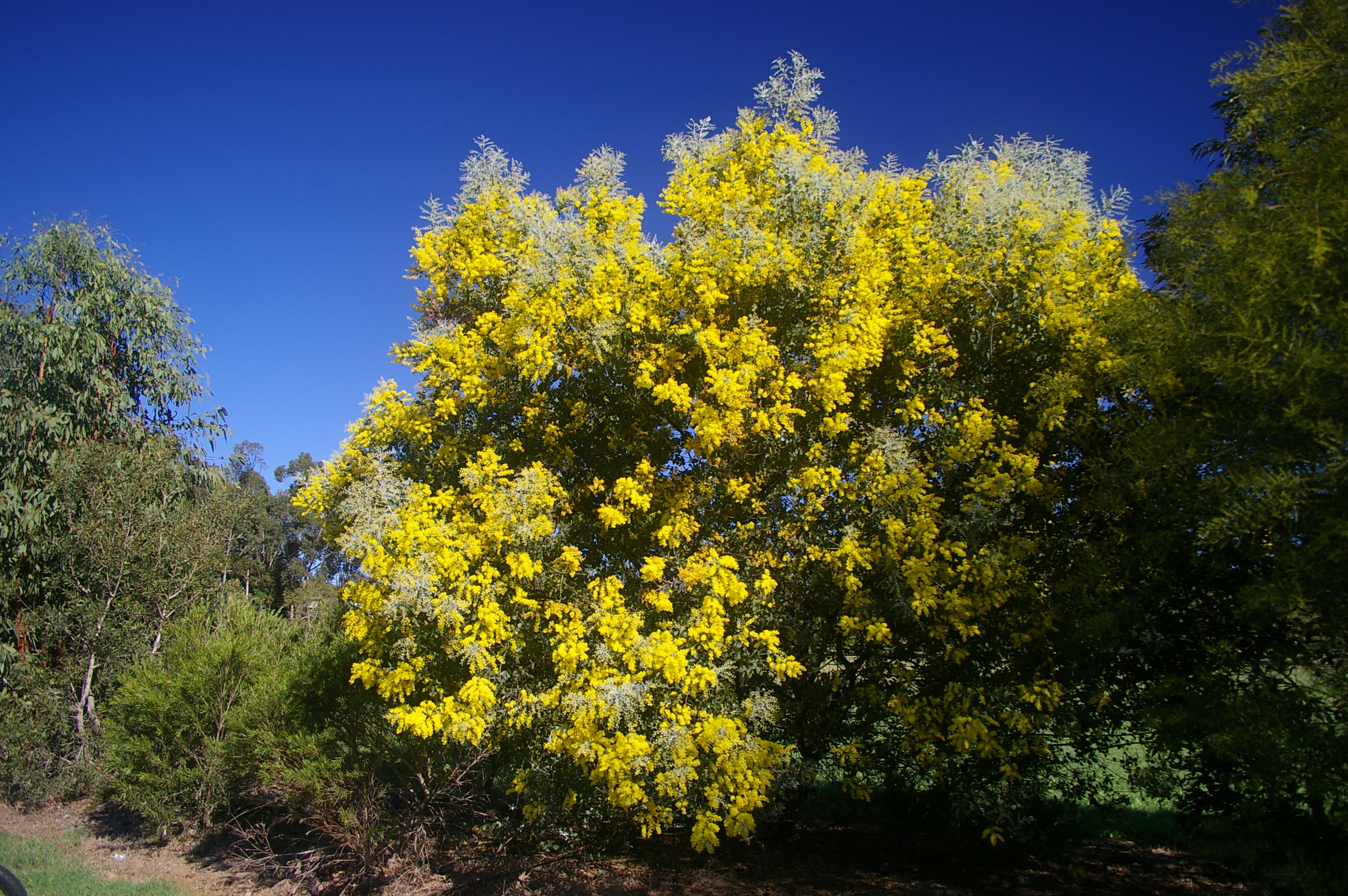
A. podalyriifolia in bloom

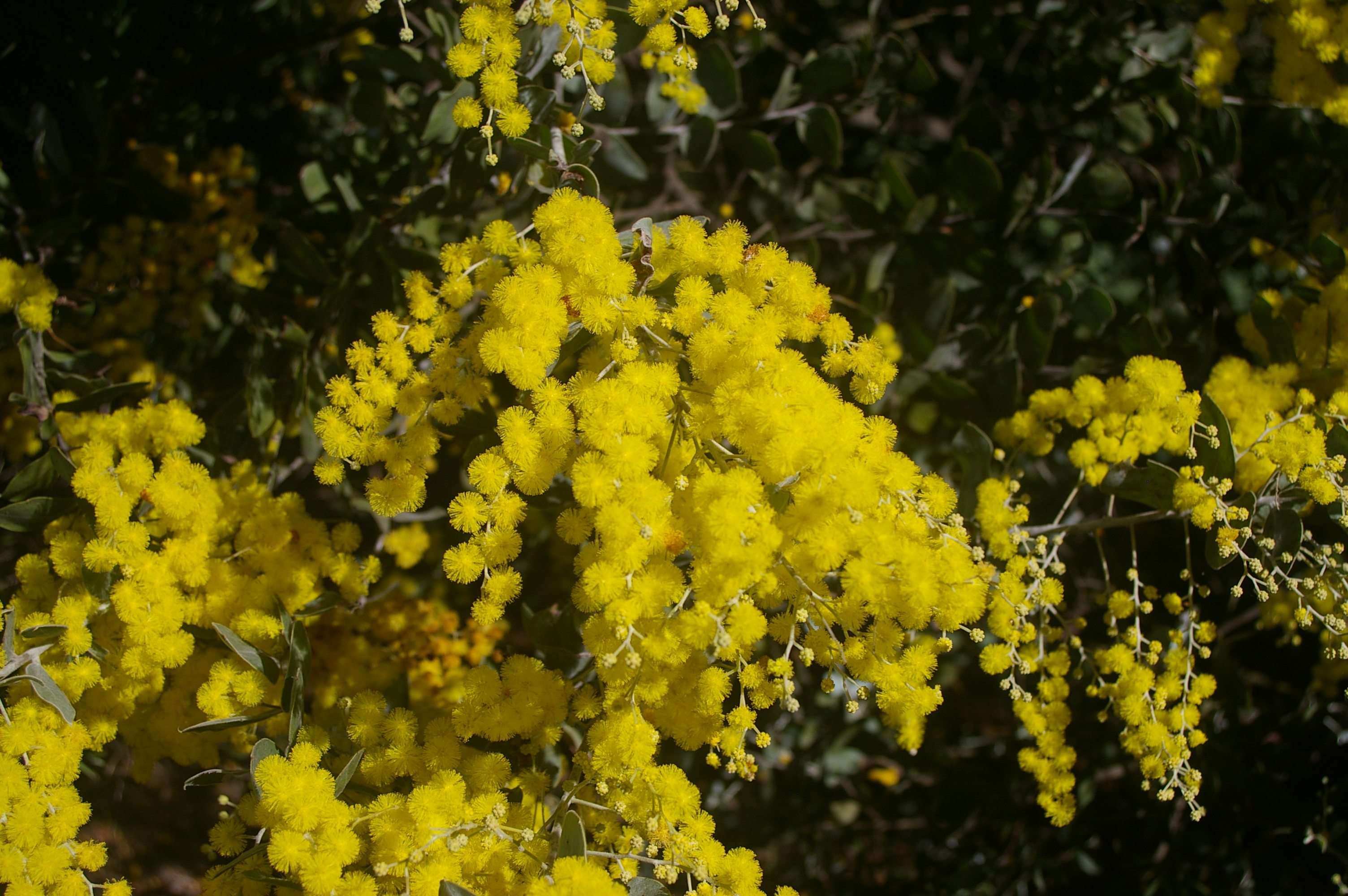
Inflorescences

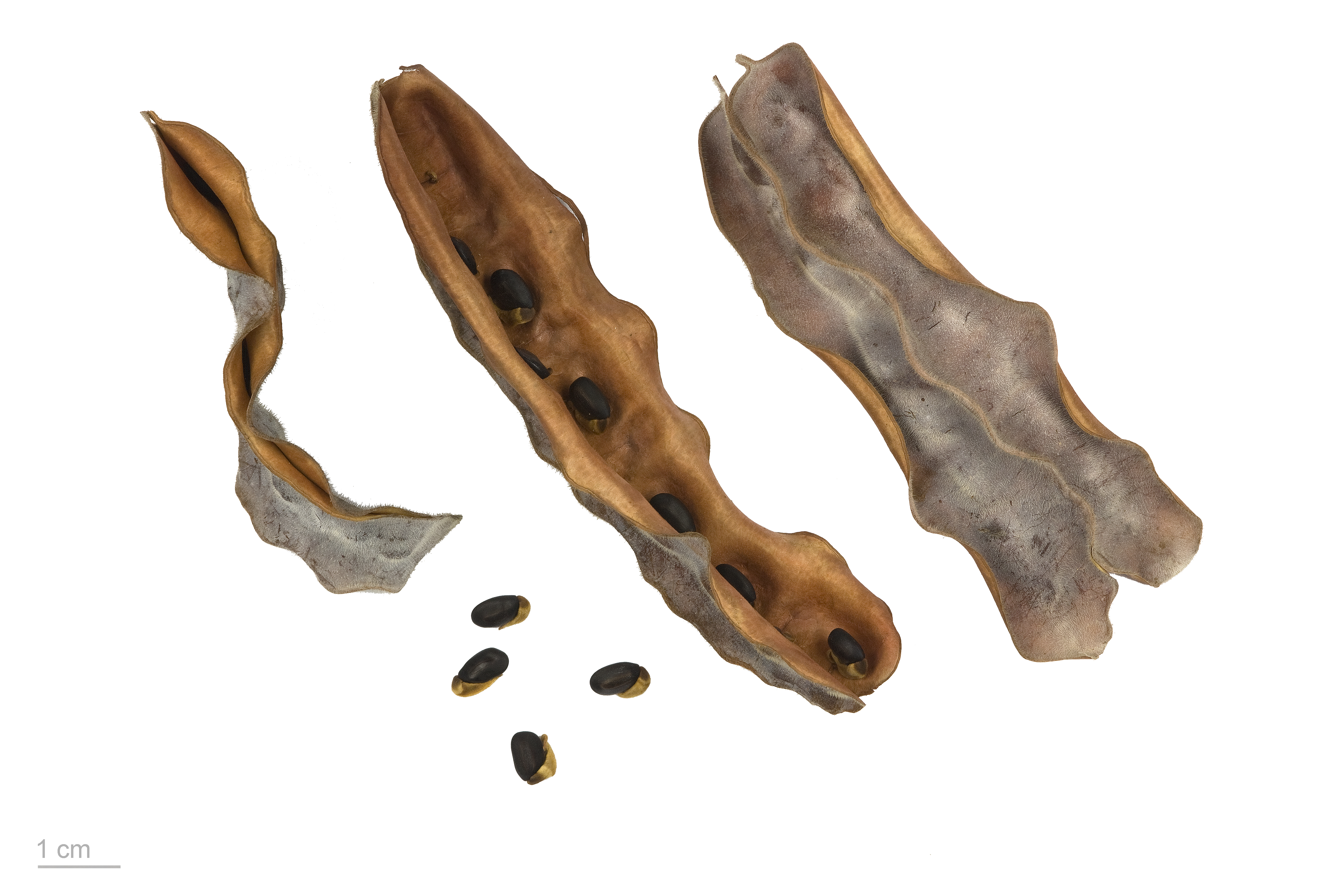
Seedpods – MHNT

== See also ==
- List of Acacia species
