= Baeopelma =

Scientific classification
- Kingdom: Animalia
- Phylum: Arthropoda
- Clade: Pancrustacea
- Class: Insecta
- Order: Hemiptera
- Suborder: Sternorrhyncha
- Family: Psyllidae
- Genus: Baeopelma; Enderlein, 1926

Genus of true bugs

Baeopelma is a genus of true bugs belonging to the family Psyllidae.

The species of this genus are found in Europe, New Zealand and Northern America.

Species:

- Baeopelma colorata (Löw, 1888)
- Baeopelma foersteri (Flor, 1861)
