= Chamaepsylla =

Scientific classification
- Domain: Eukaryota
- Kingdom: Animalia
- Phylum: Arthropoda
- Class: Insecta
- Order: Hemiptera
- Suborder: Sternorrhyncha
- Family: Psyllidae
- Genus: Chamaepsylla; Ossiannilsson, 1970

Genus of true bugs

Chamaepsylla is a genus of true bugs belonging to the family Psyllidae.

The species of this genus are found in Europe and Northern America.

Species:

- Chamaepsylla hartigii (Flor, 1861)
