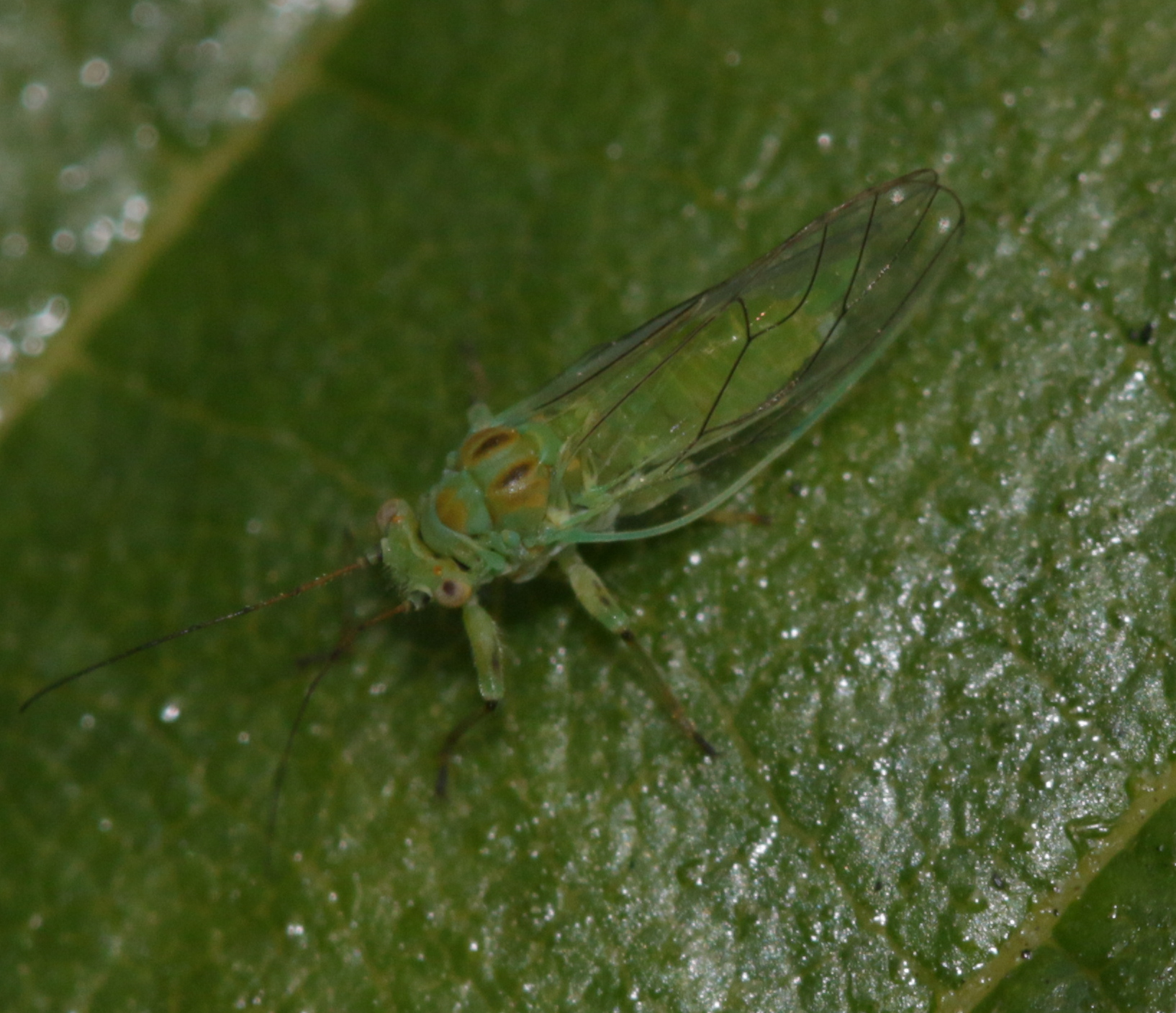
- Adult Psylla alni on alder

Scientific classification
- Kingdom: Animalia
- Phylum: Arthropoda
- Class: Insecta
- Order: Hemiptera
- Suborder: Sternorrhyncha
- Family: Psyllidae
- Genus: Psylla
- Species: P. alni

Binomial name
- Psylla alni (Linnaeus, 1758)

Synonyms
- Chermes alni Linnaeus, 1758

= Psylla alni =

Species of true bug

Psylla alni is a species of psyllid, a plant-feeding hemipteran in the family Psyllidae. It is the type species of Psylla, which is the type genus in its family.

== Distribution ==
This species is present in the Palearctic realm (from Europe to Siberia and Sakhalin, Kazakhstan, Caucasus) and in the Nearctic realm (Canada and United States of America).

== Description ==
Psylla alni can reach a body length of about 5–6 mm (0.20–0.24 in). These rather large psyllids have a green head, body, and legs, and rather long antennae. The costal marginal veins of the wings are green, while the other veins are brown. Adults are initially green, later becoming orange, brown, or reddish. The nymphs are usually covered by white waxy secretions. In the 5th preimaginal stage nymphs can reach a length of about 2–3 mm (0.079–0.118 in).

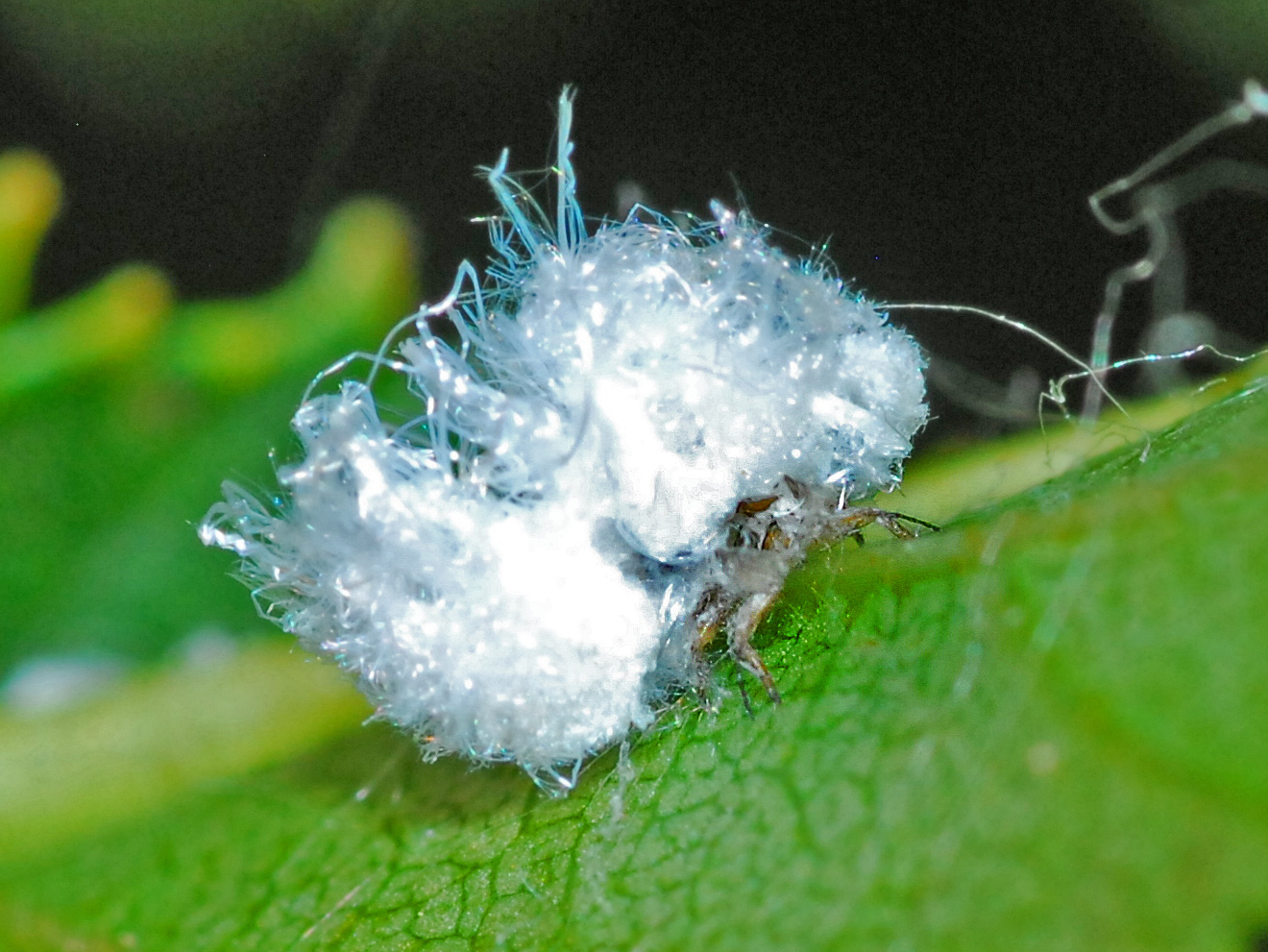
Nymph with waxy secretions

== Biology ==
Adults can be found from June to October. This species has one generation a year (univoltine) and overwinters as an egg.

It is monophagous on most Betulaceae (Alnus glutinosa, Alnus hirsuta, Alnus incana, Alnus japonica, Alnus viridis). Larvae feed on young shoots in the leaf axils.
