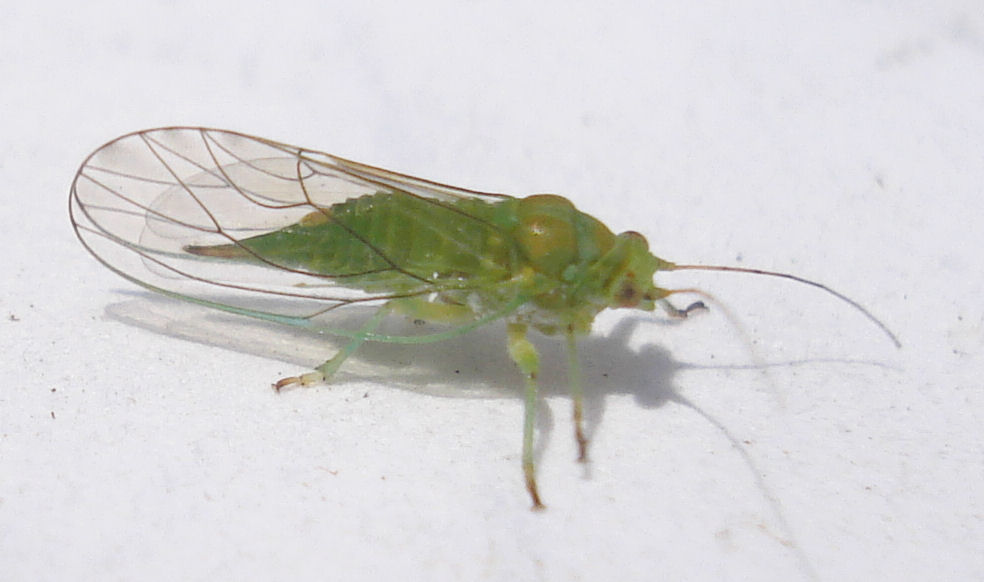
- Psylla alni (type species)

Scientific classification
- Kingdom: Animalia
- Phylum: Arthropoda
- Clade: Pancrustacea
- Class: Insecta
- Order: Hemiptera
- Suborder: Sternorrhyncha
- Superfamily: Psylloidea
- Family: Psyllidae; Latreille, 1807

= Psyllid =

Family of true bugs

Psyllidae, the jumping plant lice or psyllids, are a family of small plant-feeding insects that tend to be very host-specific, each plant-louse species feeding on just one plant species (monophagous) or a few closely related plants (oligophagous). They are found mainly on perennial plant hosts. Together with aphids, phylloxerans, scale insects and whiteflies, they form the group called Sternorrhyncha, which is considered to be the most "primitive" group within the true bugs (Hemiptera). They have traditionally been considered a single family, Psyllidae, but recent classifications divide make them one of seven families within the superfamily Psylloidea. If we consider the broader definition there are an estimated 4000 species placed in around 70 genera. Some species are considered as pests in citrus and other horticultural crops. The narrowly defined family Psyllidae does not have unambiguous support of monophyly.

== Identification and biology ==
Psyllids are small, the largest about half a centimetre long, and can be mistaken for aphids, having a tubular abdomen tip and similar body shape, but lacking cornicles. They have long 10-segmented antennae and three ocelli. Adults have strong hind legs adapted for leaping and both sexes are winged in adults. The wings are usually hyaline and show just a few veins. The radial, medial and cubital veins have one branch each. In some species the wings are patterned in black. In most species the wings are held over the body in tent-like position. In many species the apex of the wing is held raised at an angle. The proboscis is short and three segmented. The hind legs are modified and they have a large coxa, often with a backward facing process called a mercanthus. The structures on the hind legs are used in species identification. Psyllids are often collected for monitoring in yellow pan traps.

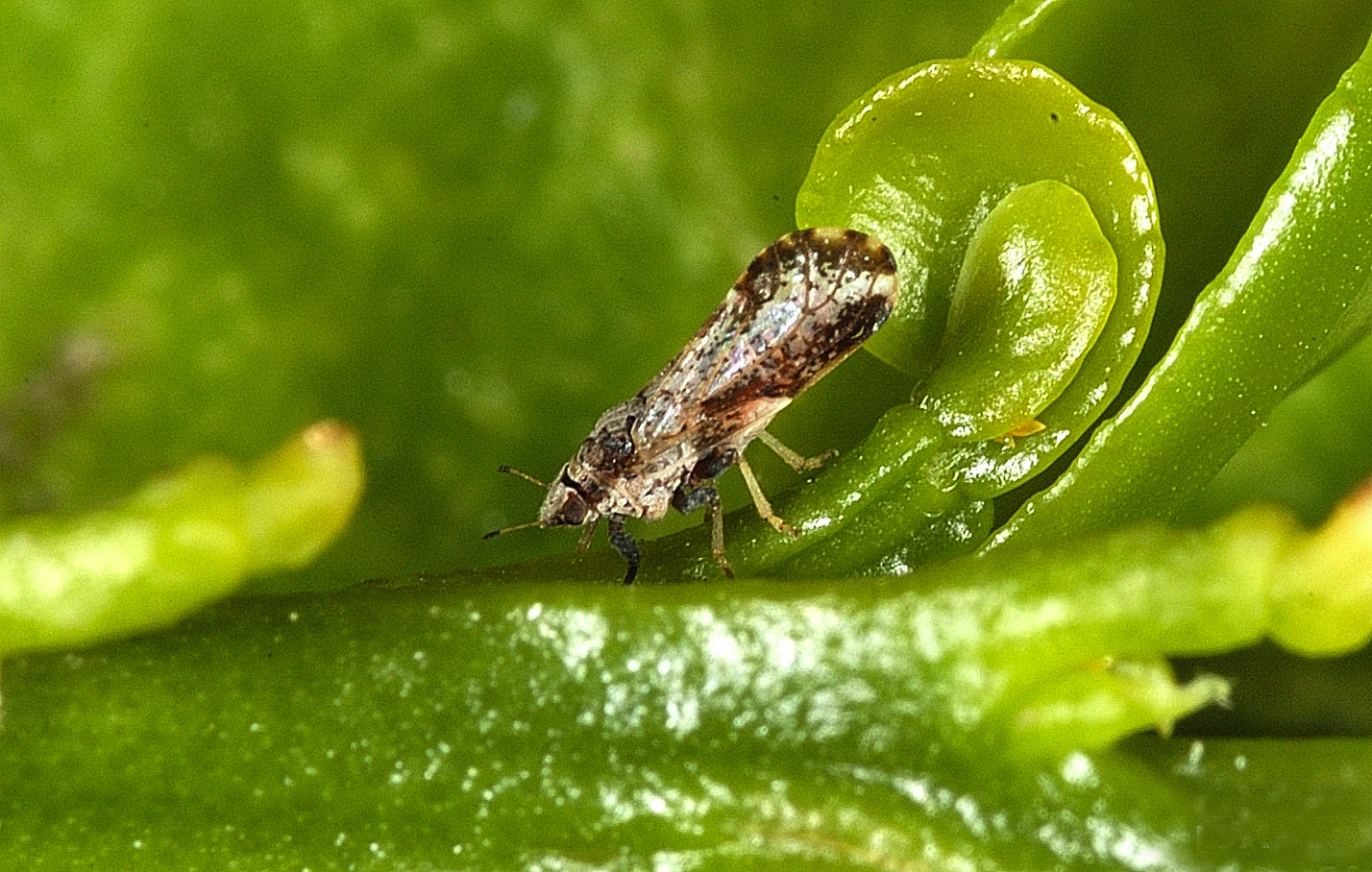
Diaphorina citri, the citrus psyllid

Psyllids hatch from eggs and go through five nymphal instars before they become adults. The winged adults are weak fliers but they can be dispersed widely by winds. They use their stylets to pierce plant tissue and feed on phloem sap. Feeding by nymphs causes leaf rolling, curling, rosette formation of growing buds, purpling, and chlorosis. They can also transmit bacteria, viruses, and phytoplasmas that affect plants. Diaphorina citri is noted for being a vector of citrus greening. Nymphs of a few psyllid species induce galls on plants and develop inside them either singly or in groups. The eggs have a stalk that is inserted into plant tissue and this induces gall formation in some species. Like other sternorrhyncha, they secrete wax and excrete honeydew with a few species attended by ants but some ant species are predators. One species Pachypsylla cohabitans is known to live as an inquiline inside the galls created by other psyllid species. Several genera of psyllids, especially among the Australian fauna, secrete coverings called "lerps" over their bodies, presumably to conceal them from predators and parasites. Psyllid parasitoids include Endopsylla (Diptera: Cecidomyiidae), which affects adults and numerous Hymenoptera that mostly lay their eggs on the nymphs.

Eogyropsylla paveloctogenarius described from 46 mya Eocene shales from Montana is considered the oldest member of the Psyllodea. Other Psylloidea fossils are described from Baltic amber of the Middle to Upper Eocene (44-38 mya). The explosive diversification of the flowering plants in the Cretaceous was paralleled by a massive diversification of associated insects, and many of the morphological and metabolic characters that the flowering plants exhibit may have evolved as defenses against herbivorous insects.

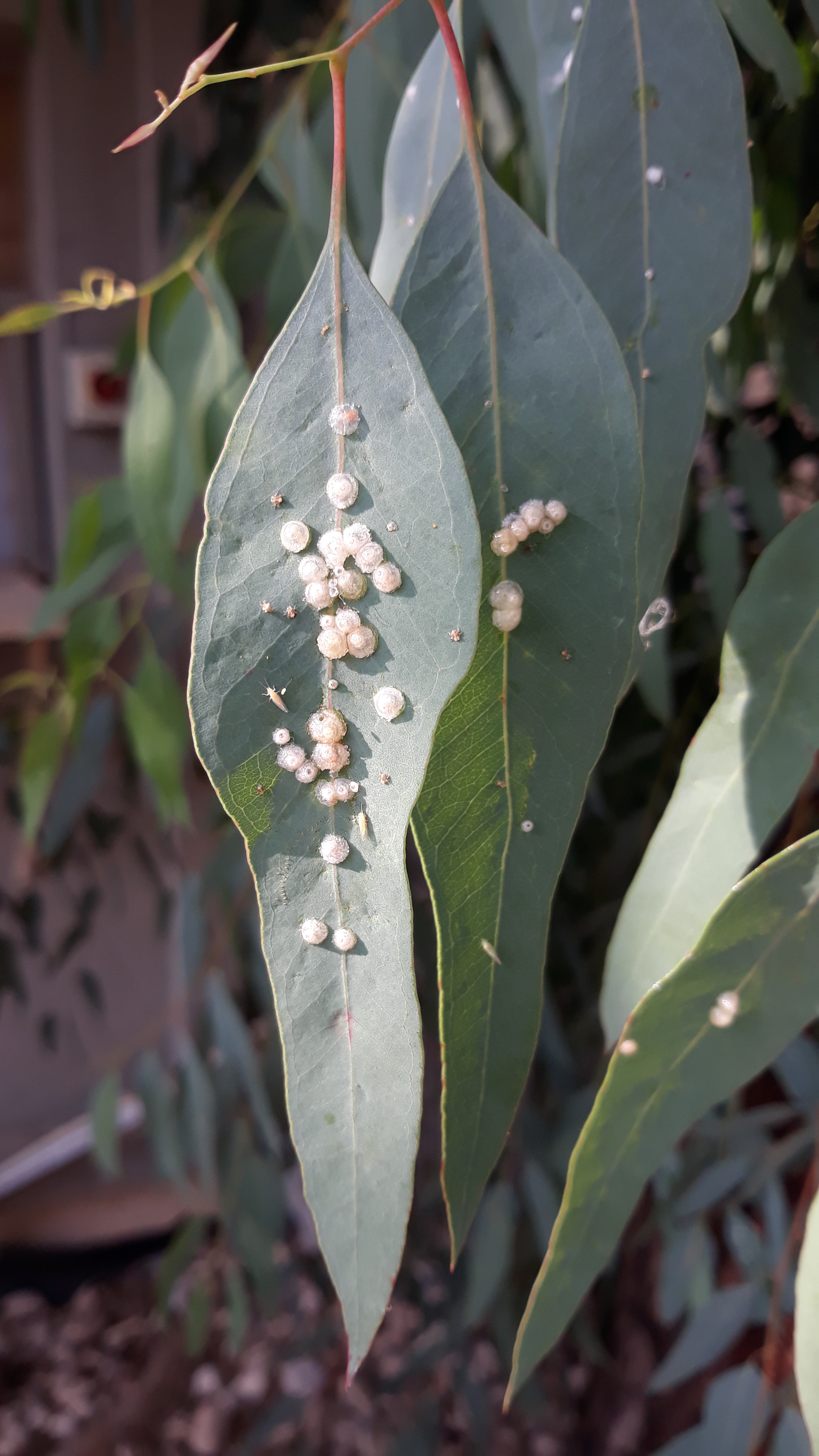
Psyllid "lerp" pest of Eucalyptus camaldulensis

== Subfamilies and genera ==
A 2021 review identified 10 subfamilies (with one from Madagascar, yet to be described), including:

Acizziinae White & Hodkinson, 1985

- Acizzia Heslop-Harrison, 1961

Amorphicolinae Burckhardt, Ouvrard & Percy, 2021

- Amorphicola Heslop-Harrison, 1961

Aphalaroidinae Vondráček, 1963

1. Aphalaroida Crawford, 1914
2. Baccharopelma Burckhardt et al., 2004
3. Burckhardtia Straube & Meritzki
4. Connectopelma Šulc, 1914 (replacement name for Delina Blanchard nec Robineau-Desvoidy)
5. Ehrendorferiana Burckhardt, 2005
6. Freysuila Aleman, 1887 (syn. Indana)
7. Pachyparia Loginova, 1967
8. Panisopelma Enderlein, 1910
9. †Primascena Klimaszewski, 1998
10. Prosopidopsylla Burckhardt, 1987
11. Russelliana Tuthill, 1959 (syn. Arepuna)
12. Sphinia Blanchard, 1852
13. Yangus Fang, 1990 (syn. Pallipsylla)
14. Zonopelma Burckhardt, 1987

=== Ciriacreminae ===
Authority: Enderlein, 1910

1. Auchmerina Enderlein, 1918
2. Auchmeriniella Brown & Hodkinson, 1988
3. Caradocia Laing, 1923
4. Ciriacremum Enderlein, 1910
5. Euceropsylla Boselli, 1929
6. Geijerolyma Froggatt, 1903
7. Heteropsylla Crawford, 1914
8. Hollisiana Burckhardt, Ouvrard & Percy, 2021
9. Insnesia Tuthill, 1964
10. Isogonoceraia Tuthill, 1964
11. Jataiba Burckhardt & Queiroz, 2020
12. Kleiniella Aulmann, 1912 (syn. Desmiostigma, Syndesmophlebia)
13. Manapa Brown & Hodkinson, 1988
14. Mitrapsylla Crawford, 1914
15. Queiroziella Burckhardt, 2021
16. Palmapenna Hollis, 1976
17. Telmapsylla Hodkinson, 1992
18. Trigonon (bug) Crawford, 1920

=== Diaphorininae ===
Authority: Vondráček, 1951

1. Diaphorina Löw, 1880 (syn. Brachypsylla, Diaphora. Gonanoplicus, Pennavena, Eudiaphorina)
2. Parapsylla Heslop-Harrison, 1961 (syn. Agmapsylla)

=== Katacephalinae ===
Authority: Burckhardt, Ouvrard & Percy, 2021

1. Katacephala Crawford, 1914 (syn. Jenseniella)
2. Lautereropsis Burckhardt & Malenovský, 2003
3. Notophorina Burckhardt, 1987
4. Tuthillia Hodkinson, Brown & Burckhardt, 1986

=== Macrocorsinae ===
Authority: Vondráček, 1963

1. Apsyllopsis Burckhardt & Queiroz, 2020
2. Brinckitia Heslop-Harrison, 1961
3. Colophorina Capener, 1973 (syn. †Otroacizzia)
4. Epiacizzia Li, 2002
5. Euphaleropsis Li, 2004 (syn. Peregrinivena)
6. Euphalerus Schwarz, 1904
7. Euryconus Aulmann, 1912
8. Macrocorsa Vondráček, 1963
9. Paraphyllura Yang, 1984
10. Pugionipsylla Li in Li et al., 2006
11. Retroacizzia Heslop-Harrison, 1961
12. Tridencopsylla Li, 2002
13. Trisetipsylla Yang & Li, 1984

=== Platycoryphinae ===
Authority: Burckhardt, Ouvrard & Percy, 2021

1. Allophorina Hodkinson, 1991
2. Limbopsylla Brown & Hodkinson, 1988
3. Padaukia Hollis & Martin, 1993 (syn. Peltapaurocephala)
4. Platycorypha Tuthill, 1945 (syn. Neopsyllia)

=== Psyllinae ===
Authority: Latreille, 1807; selected genera:

- Cacopsylla Ossiannilsson, 1970 (syn. Edentatipsylla, Hepatopsylla, Osmopsylla, Thamnopsylla, Psyllia)
- Psylla Geoffroy, 1762 (syn. Baeopelma syn. nov., Chamaepsylla syn. nov., Psylla (Labyrinthopsylla) syn. nov., Asphagis Enderlein, 1921)

Note: the genus Pachypsylla is now placed in the family Carsidaridae.

== Coevolution ==
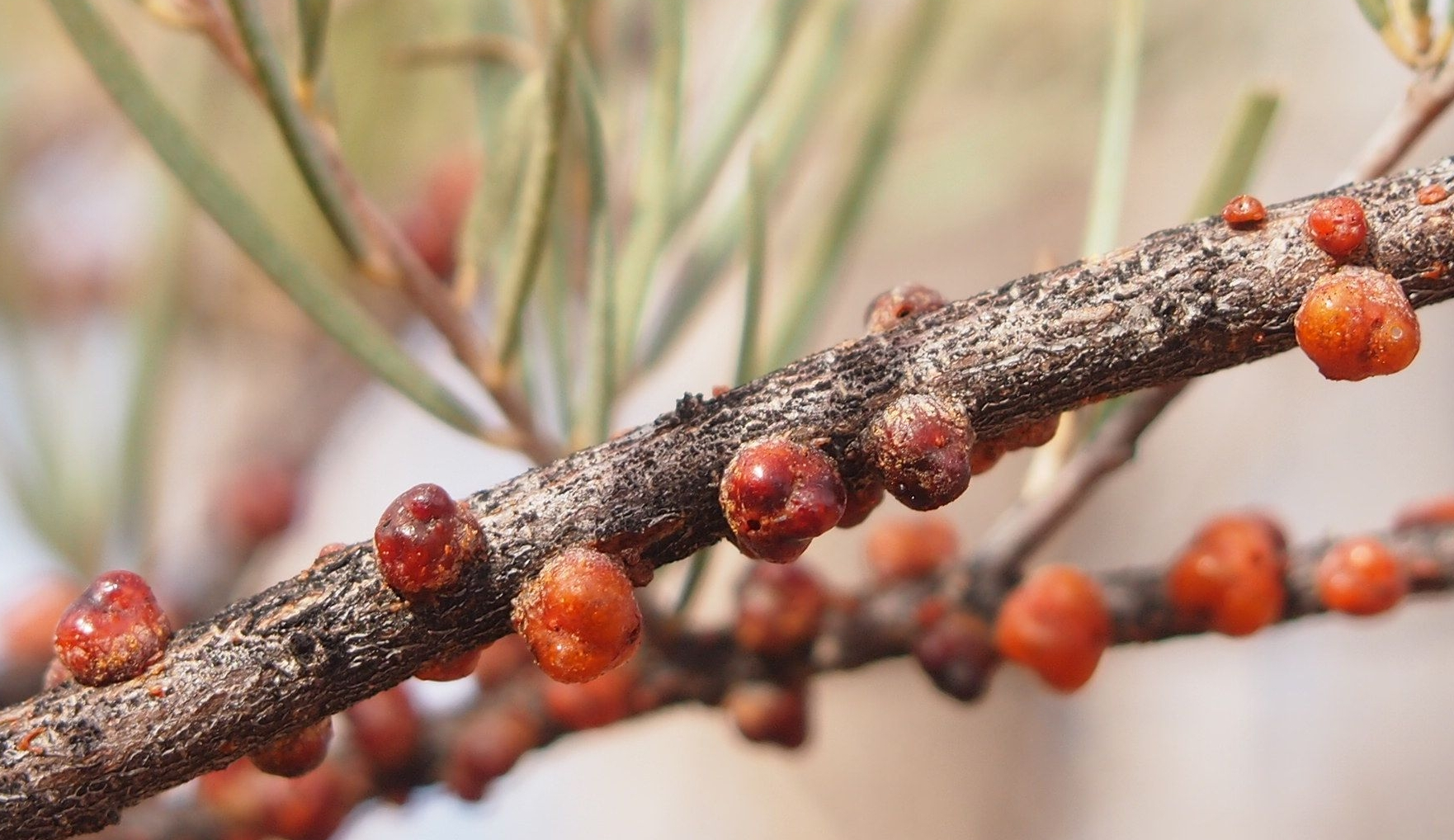
Red lerps (Austrochardia acaciae) on Mulga, Central Australia

Insect-plant interactions have been important in defining models of coevolution and cospeciation, referring to whether plant speciation drives insect speciation and vice versa, though most herbivorous insects probably evolved long after the plants on which they feed.

== Status as pests ==
With taxonomic revisions at genus level and above, species including agricultural pests, that have been classed as "Psyllids" may now placed in other families including the Carsidaridae, Liviidae and Triozidae.

Citrus greening, also known as huanglongbing, associated with the presence of a bacterium Liberibacter asiaticum, is an example of a plant pathogen that has coevolved with its insect vector, the "Asian citrus psyllid", ACP, Diaphorina citri, such that the pathogen causes little or no harm to the insect, but causes a major disease which can reduce citrus quality, flavor, and production, as well as causing citrus trees to die. ACP was found in Florida in 1998, and has since spread across the southern US into Texas. This disease was found in Florida citrus groves in 2005. Management methods to reduce the spread of this disease and psyllid populations depend on an integrated pest management approach using insecticides, parasitoids, predators, and pathogens specific to ACP. Due to the spread of citrus greening worldwide and the growing importance of psyllid-spread diseases, an International Psyllid Genome Consortium was established. Insect genomics provides important information on the genetic basis of the pest's biology which may be altered to suppress psyllid populations in an environmentally friendly manner. The emerging psyllid genome continues to elucidate psyllid biology, expanding what is known about gene families, genetic variation, and gene expression in insects. Thus far, two new psyllid viruses have been discovered, and are being examined as potential biological control agents to reduce psyllid populations. Psyllid cell cultures have also been established by several researchers working with virus propagation, and as a system to propagate C. liberibacter for molecular studies on infection and replication. Studies on the microbiota have also identified four new species of bacteria. Thus far, 10 microbial organisms have been identified within these psyllids, among them the primary endosymbiont, whose genome has been sequenced and posted at the NCBI database, as well as a Wolbachia species.
