= Chaetofoveolocoris hirsutus =

Scientific classification
- Kingdom: Animalia
- Phylum: Arthropoda
- Class: Insecta
- Order: Hemiptera
- Suborder: Heteroptera
- Family: Miridae
- Tribe: Stenodemini
- Genus: Chaetofoveolocoris
- Species: C. hirsutus

Binomial name
- Chaetofoveolocoris hirsutus (Knight, 1968)

Synonyms
- Megaloceroea hirsuta Knight, 1968

Species of true bug

Chaetofoveolocoris hirsutus is a species of plant bug in the family Miridae. It is found in Central America and North America.
