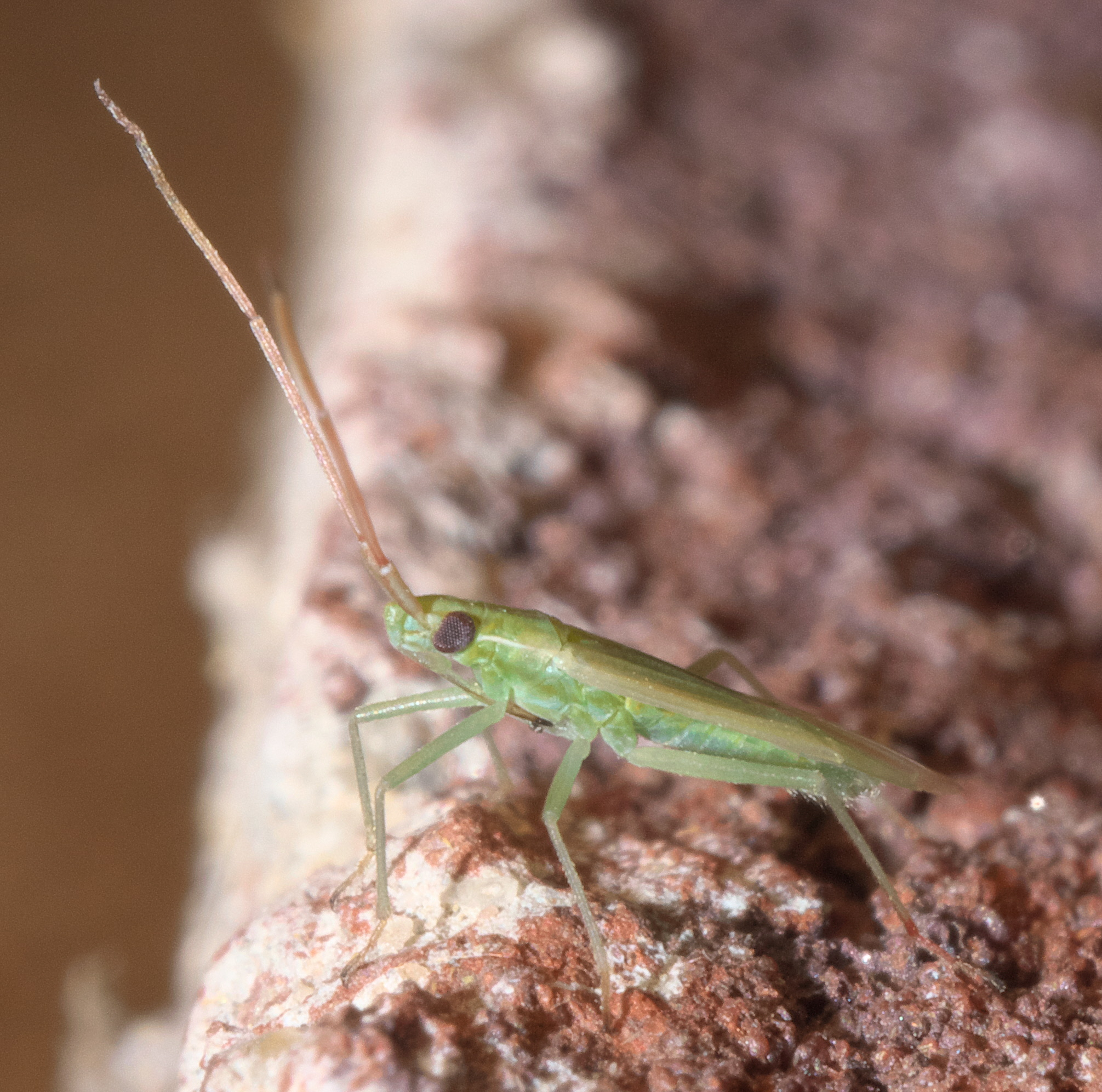

Scientific classification
- Kingdom: Animalia
- Phylum: Arthropoda
- Class: Insecta
- Order: Hemiptera
- Suborder: Heteroptera
- Family: Miridae
- Tribe: Stenodemini
- Genus: Trigonotylus
- Species: T. caelestialium

Binomial name
- Trigonotylus caelestialium (Kirkaldy, 1902)

= Trigonotylus caelestialium =

Species of true bug

Trigonotylus caelestialium, the rice leaf bug, is a species of plant bug in the family Miridae. It is found in Europe and Northern Asia (excluding China) and North America.

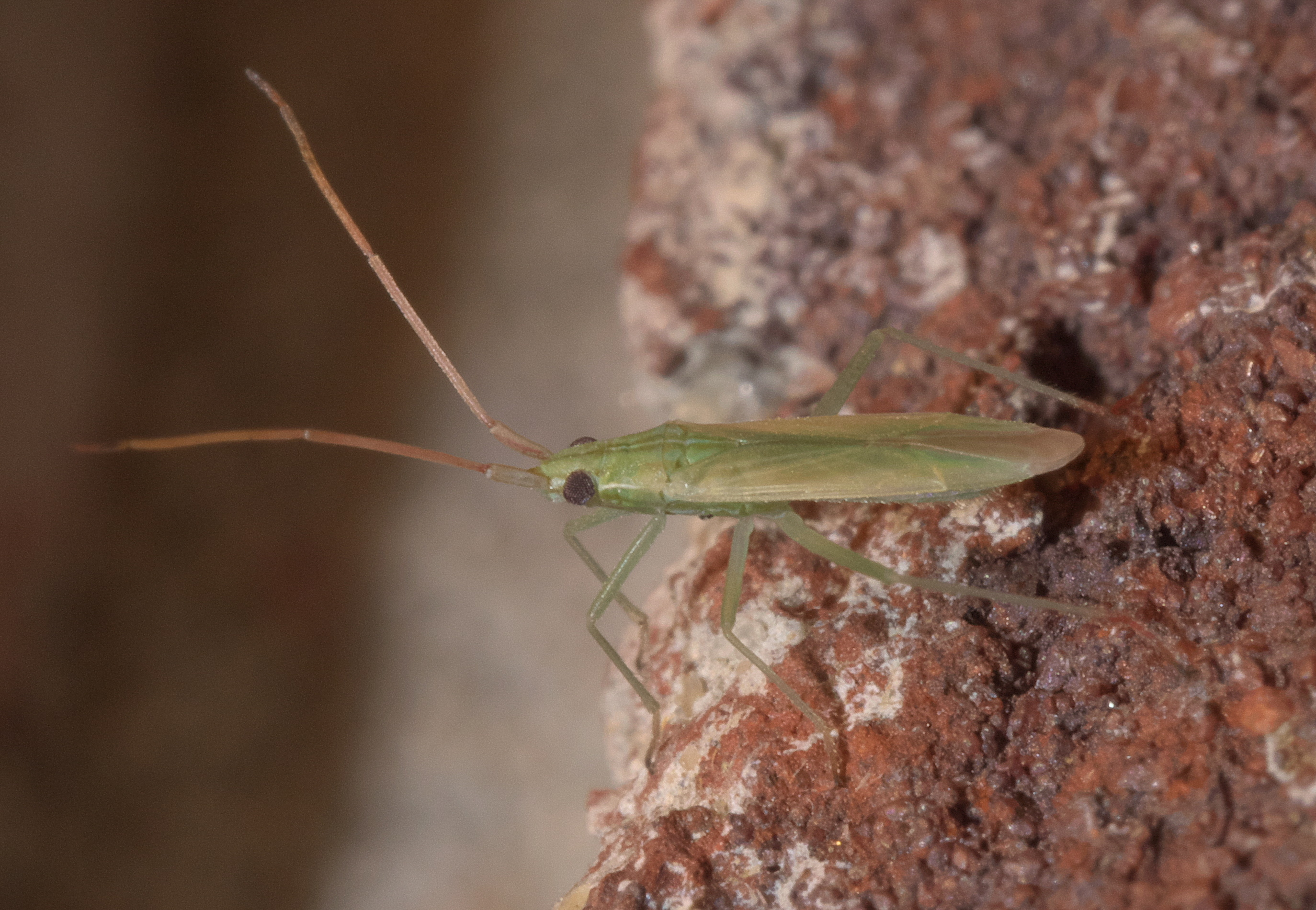
Rice leaf bug, Trigonotylus caelestialium
