= Autumnimiris rubicundus =

Scientific classification
- Kingdom: Animalia
- Phylum: Arthropoda
- Class: Insecta
- Order: Hemiptera
- Suborder: Heteroptera
- Family: Miridae
- Tribe: Stenodemini
- Genus: Autumnimiris
- Species: A. rubicundus

Binomial name
- Autumnimiris rubicundus (Uhler, 1872)

Species of true bug

Autumnimiris rubicundus is a species of plant bug in the family Miridae. It is found in Central America and North America.
