= Collaria meilleurii =

Scientific classification
- Kingdom: Animalia
- Phylum: Arthropoda
- Class: Insecta
- Order: Hemiptera
- Suborder: Heteroptera
- Family: Miridae
- Tribe: Stenodemini
- Genus: Collaria
- Species: C. meilleurii

Binomial name
- Collaria meilleurii Provancher, 1872

Species of true bug

Collaria meilleurii is a species of plant bug in the family Miridae. It is found in North America.
