= Teratocoris paludum =

Scientific classification
- Kingdom: Animalia
- Phylum: Arthropoda
- Class: Insecta
- Order: Hemiptera
- Suborder: Heteroptera
- Family: Miridae
- Tribe: Stenodemini
- Genus: Teratocoris
- Species: T. paludum

Binomial name
- Teratocoris paludum Sahlberg, 1870

Species of true bug

Teratocoris paludum is a species of plant bug in the family Miridae. It is found in Europe and Northern Asia (excluding China) and North America.
