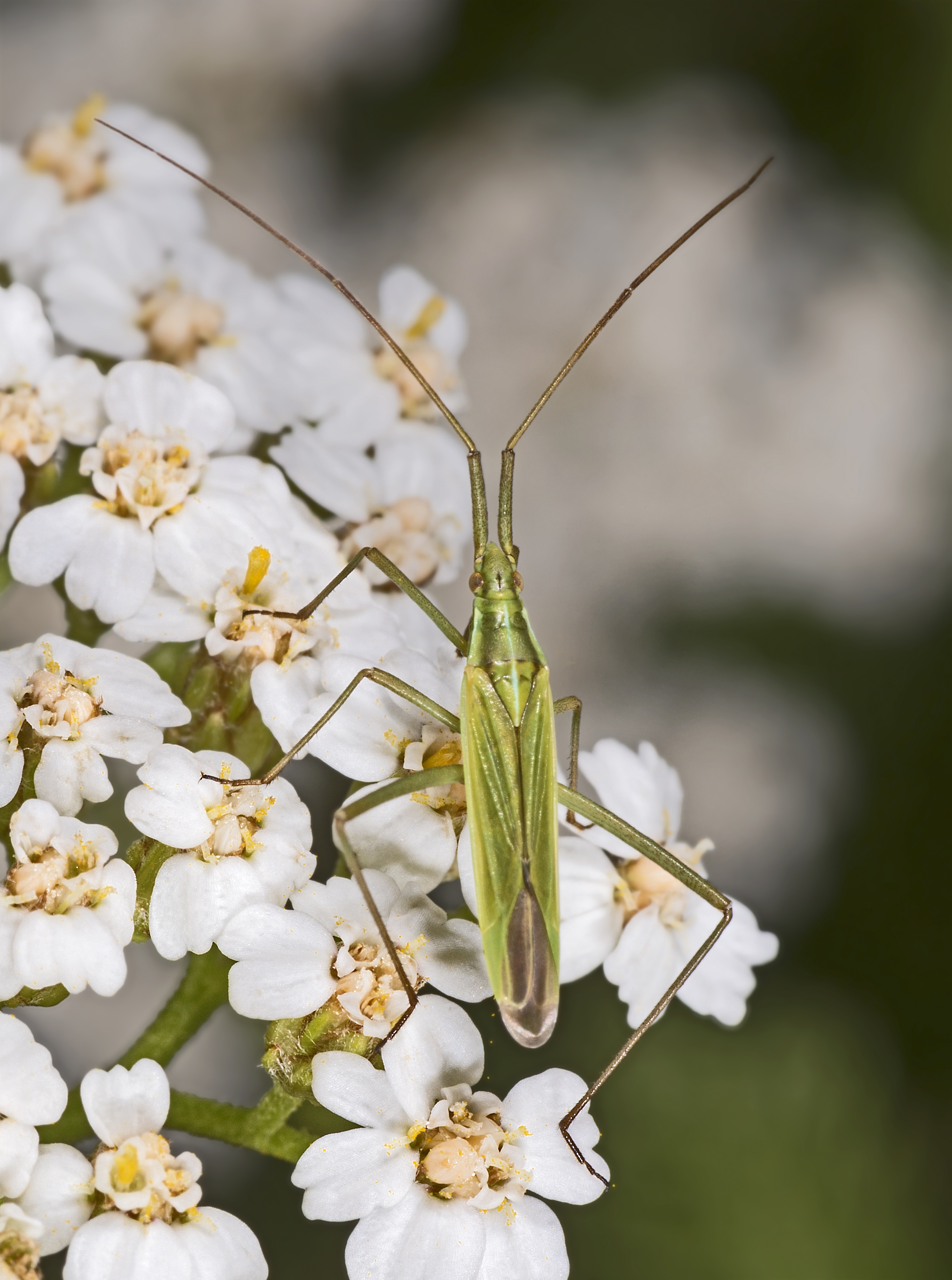
- Megaloceroea recticornis on Achillea millefolium flowers

Scientific classification
- Domain: Eukaryota
- Kingdom: Animalia
- Phylum: Arthropoda
- Class: Insecta
- Order: Hemiptera
- Suborder: Heteroptera
- Family: Miridae
- Subfamily: Mirinae
- Tribe: Stenodemini
- Genus: Megaloceroea
- Species: M. recticornis

Binomial name
- Megaloceroea recticornis (Geoffroy, 1785)

= Megaloceroea recticornis =

Species of true bug

Megaloceroea recticornis is a species of plant bugs in the Miridae family, that is found throughout the British Isles, much of mainland Europe, and North America.

== Description ==
Adults length is 8–10 mm, the colour of which is green.

== Ecology ==
Both adults and larvae feed on various grasses, usually on meadow foxtail, red fescue, timothy and yarrow (as illustrated).

== See also ==
- List of heteropteran bugs recorded in Britain
