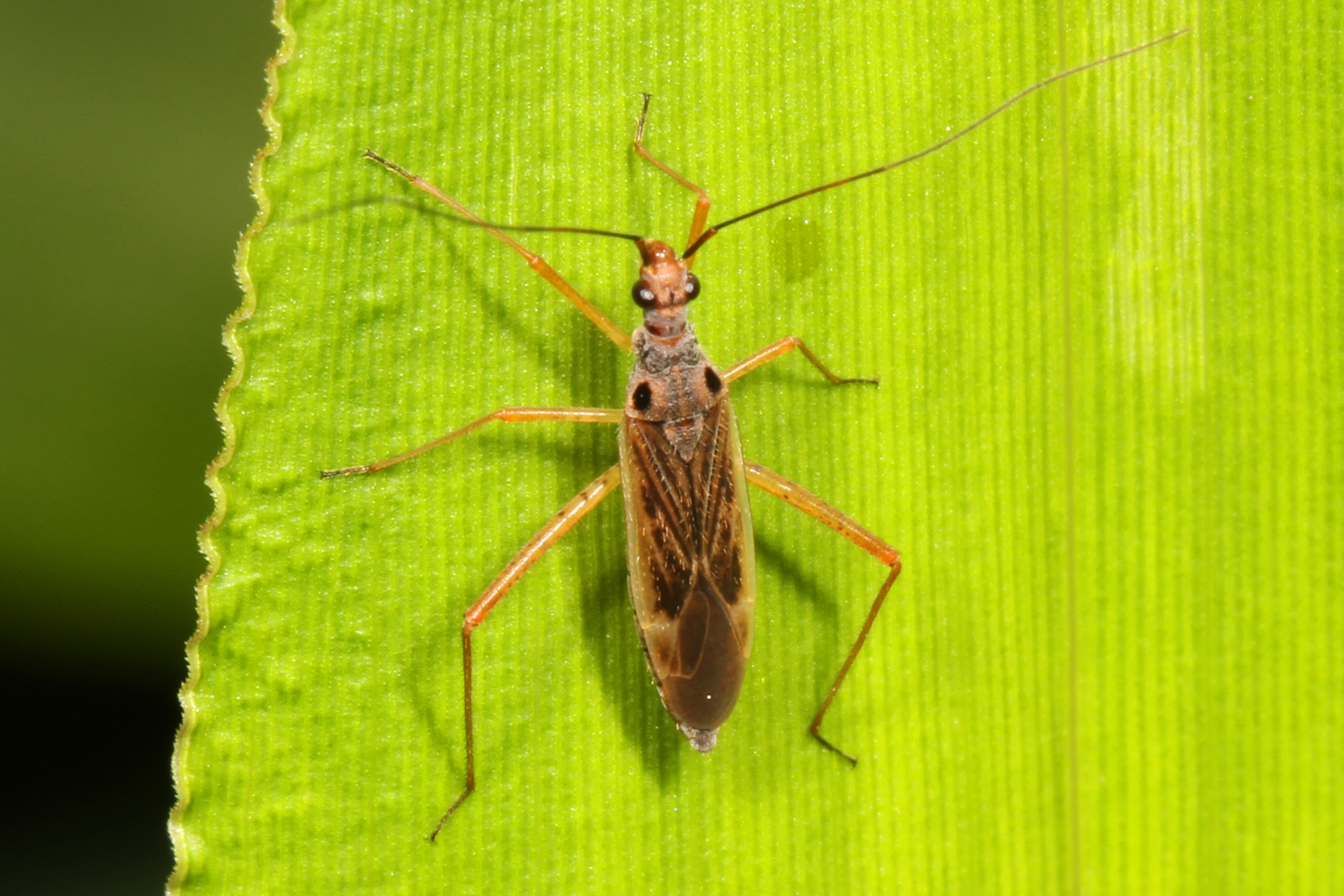

Scientific classification
- Kingdom: Animalia
- Phylum: Arthropoda
- Class: Insecta
- Order: Hemiptera
- Suborder: Heteroptera
- Family: Miridae
- Tribe: Stenodemini
- Genus: Collaria
- Species: C. oculata

Binomial name
- Collaria oculata (Reuter, 1876)

= Collaria oculata =

Species of true bug

Collaria oculata is a species of plant bug in the family Miridae. It is found in Central America and North America.
