= Stenodema pilosipes =

Scientific classification
- Kingdom: Animalia
- Phylum: Arthropoda
- Class: Insecta
- Order: Hemiptera
- Suborder: Heteroptera
- Family: Miridae
- Tribe: Stenodemini
- Genus: Stenodema
- Species: S. pilosipes

Binomial name
- Stenodema pilosipes Kelton, 1961

Species of true bug

Stenodema pilosipes is a species of plant bug in the family Miridae. It is found in North America.
