= Teratocoris discolor =

Scientific classification
- Kingdom: Animalia
- Phylum: Arthropoda
- Class: Insecta
- Order: Hemiptera
- Suborder: Heteroptera
- Family: Miridae
- Tribe: Stenodemini
- Genus: Teratocoris
- Species: T. discolor

Binomial name
- Teratocoris discolor Uhler, 1887

Species of true bug

Teratocoris discolor is a species of plant bug in the family Miridae. It is found in North America.
