= Collaria =

Collaria is the scientific name of two genera of organisms and may refer to:

- Collaria (bug), a genus of insects in the family Miridae
- Collaria (slime mold), a genus of slime molds in the family Lamprodermataceae
