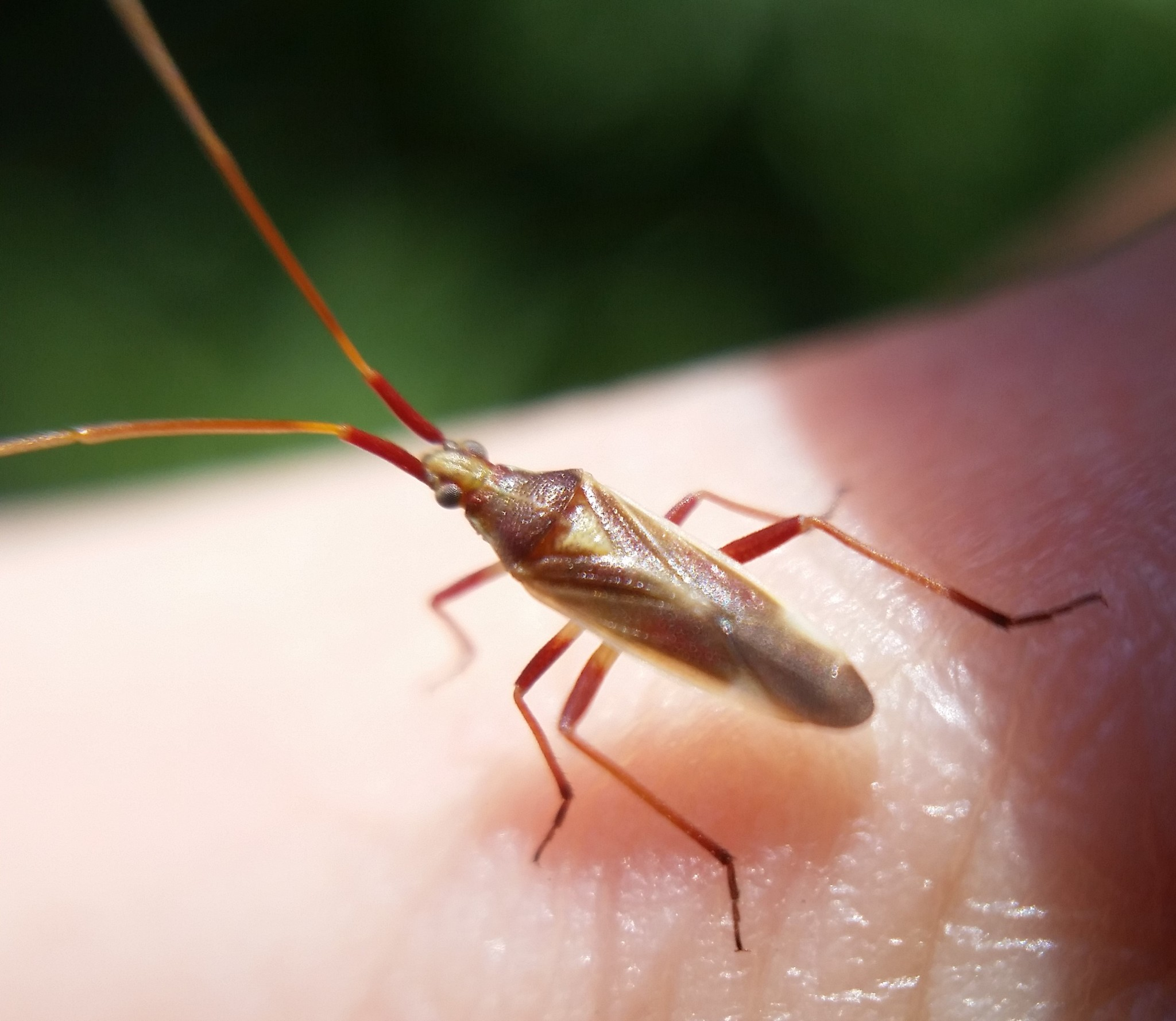

Scientific classification
- Kingdom: Animalia
- Phylum: Arthropoda
- Class: Insecta
- Order: Hemiptera
- Suborder: Heteroptera
- Family: Miridae
- Tribe: Stenodemini
- Genus: Porpomiris
- Species: P. curtulus

Binomial name
- Porpomiris curtulus (Reuter, 1909)

= Porpomiris curtulus =

Species of true bug

Porpomiris curtulus is a species of plant bug in the family Miridae. It is found in North America.
