= Litomiris curtus =

Scientific classification
- Kingdom: Animalia
- Phylum: Arthropoda
- Class: Insecta
- Order: Hemiptera
- Suborder: Heteroptera
- Family: Miridae
- Tribe: Stenodemini
- Genus: Litomiris
- Species: L. curtus

Binomial name
- Litomiris curtus (Knight, 1928)

Species of true bug

Litomiris curtus is a species of plant bug in the family Miridae. It is found in North America.
