= Trigonotylus uhleri =

Scientific classification
- Kingdom: Animalia
- Phylum: Arthropoda
- Class: Insecta
- Order: Hemiptera
- Suborder: Heteroptera
- Family: Miridae
- Tribe: Stenodemini
- Genus: Trigonotylus
- Species: T. uhleri

Binomial name
- Trigonotylus uhleri (Reuter, 1876)

Species of true bug

Trigonotylus uhleri is a species of plant bug in the family Miridae. It is found in North America.
