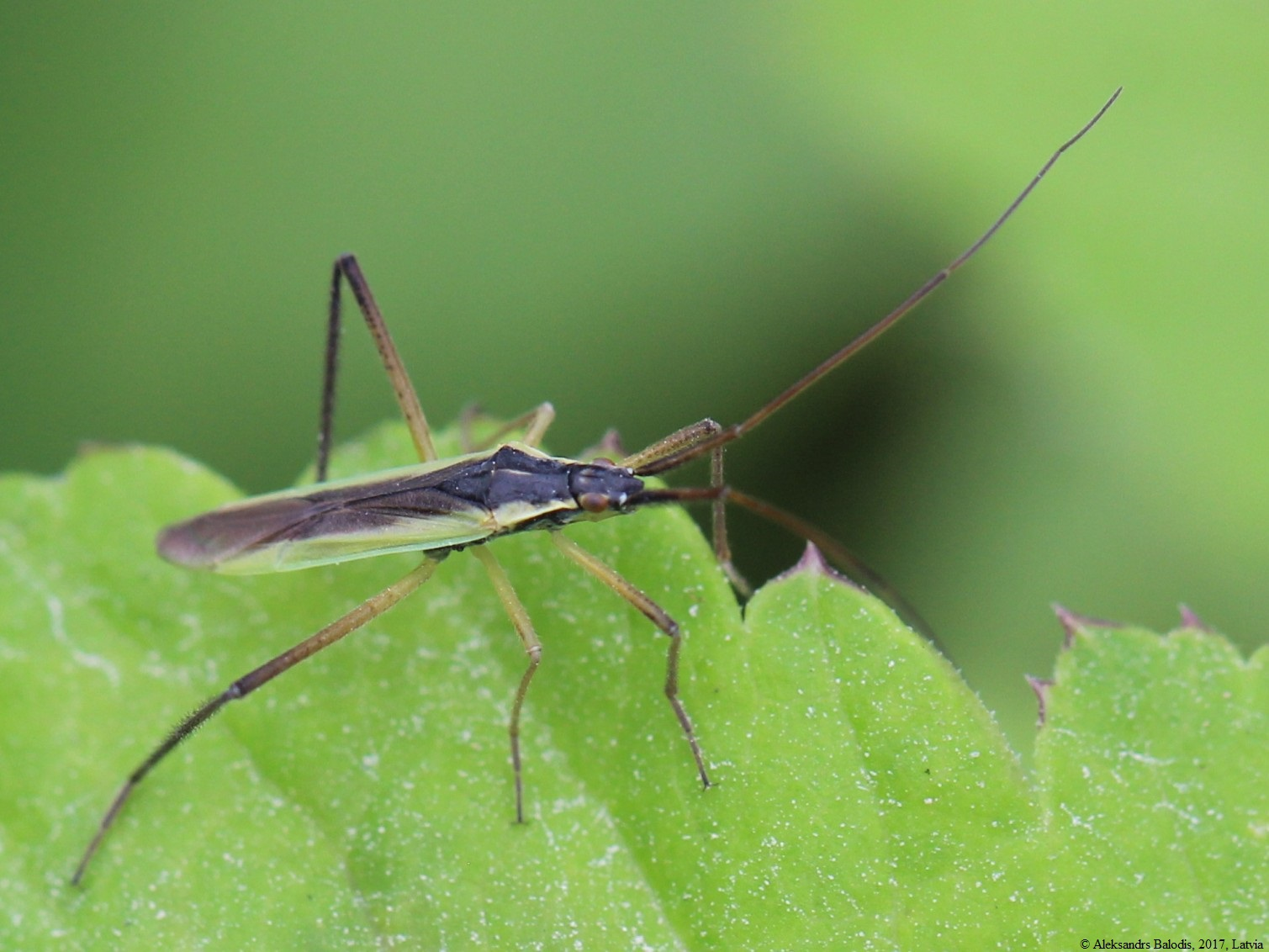
- Notostira erratica, Latvia

Scientific classification
- Kingdom: Animalia
- Phylum: Arthropoda
- Class: Insecta
- Order: Hemiptera
- Suborder: Heteroptera
- Family: Miridae
- Genus: Notostira
- Species: N. erratica

Binomial name
- Notostira erratica (Linnaeus, 1758)

= Notostira erratica =

Erratic Plant Bug

Species of true bug

Notostira erratica, known as the erratic plant bug, is a species of bugs from a Miridae family, subfamily Mirinae that can be found everywhere in Europe except for Azores, Benelux, Faroe Islands, Madeira, Malta, and African and Asia ones such as Canary Islands and Cyprus.

== Biology ==
Occurs on dry grass-dominated areas where it lives on various grasses, notably Calamagrostis and Alopecurus.

As in N. elongata males winter in the egg stage, and the females wintering in the imago.
