= Litomiris =

Scientific classification
- Kingdom: Animalia
- Phylum: Arthropoda
- Clade: Pancrustacea
- Class: Insecta
- Order: Hemiptera
- Suborder: Heteroptera
- Family: Miridae
- Tribe: Stenodemini
- Genus: Litomiris; Slater, 1956

Genus of true bugs

Litomiris is a genus of plant bugs in the family Miridae. There are at least three described species in Litomiris.

== Species ==
These three species belong to the genus Litomiris:

- Litomiris curtus (Knight, 1928)^{i c g b}
- Litomiris debilis (Uhler, 1871)^{i c b}
- Litomiris gracilis (Van Duzee, 1914)^{i c g}

Data sources: i = ITIS, c = Catalogue of Life, g = GBIF, b = Bugguide.net
