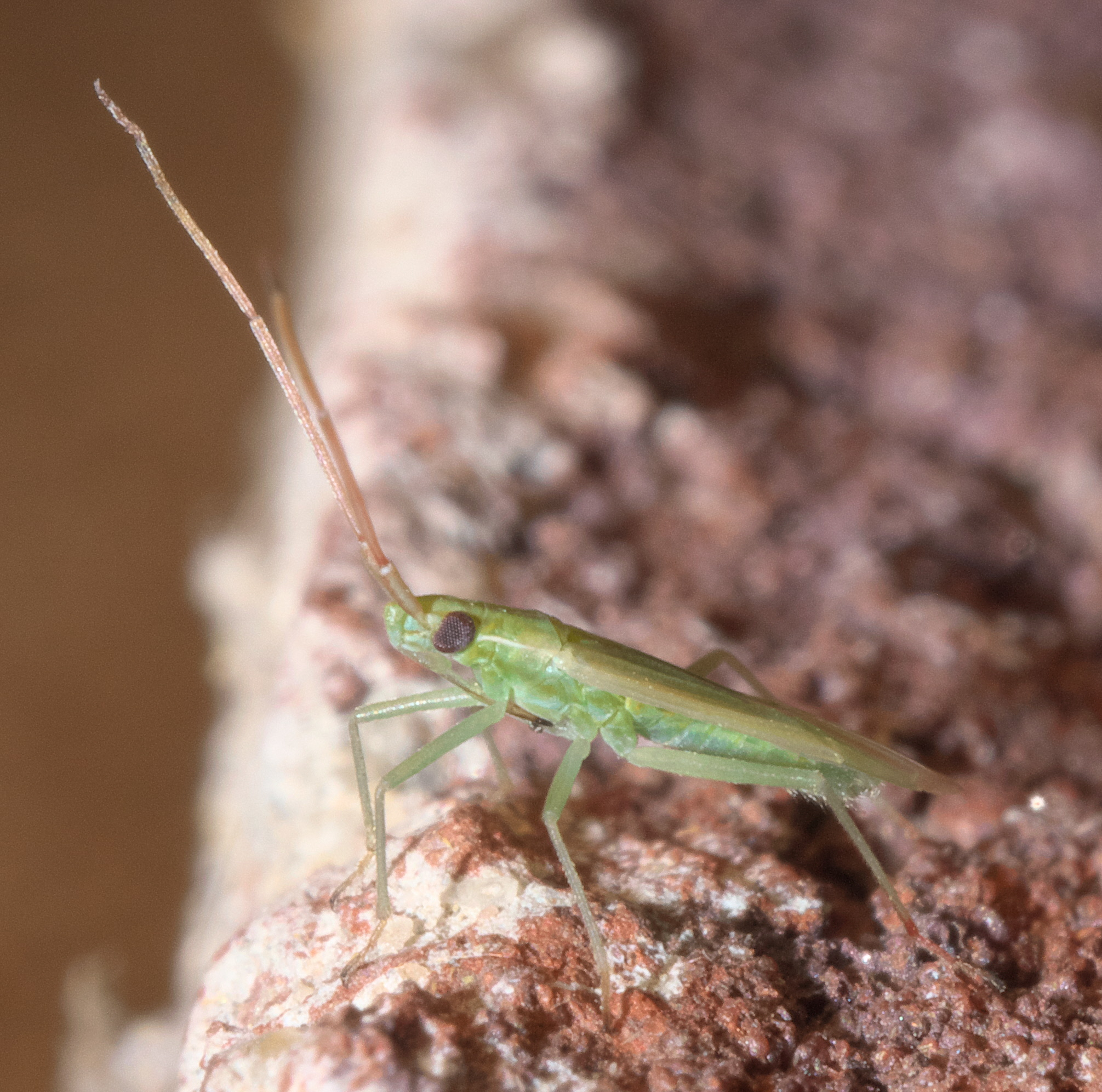
- Trigonotylus caelestialium

Scientific classification
- Kingdom: Animalia
- Phylum: Arthropoda
- Class: Insecta
- Order: Hemiptera
- Suborder: Heteroptera
- Family: Miridae
- Subfamily: Mirinae
- Tribe: Stenodemini
- Genus: Trigonotylus; Fieber, 1858

Synonyms
- Callimiris Reuter, 1876

= Trigonotylus =

Genus of true bugs

Trigonotylus is a genus of plant bugs in the family Miridae. There are about 18 described species in Trigonotylus.

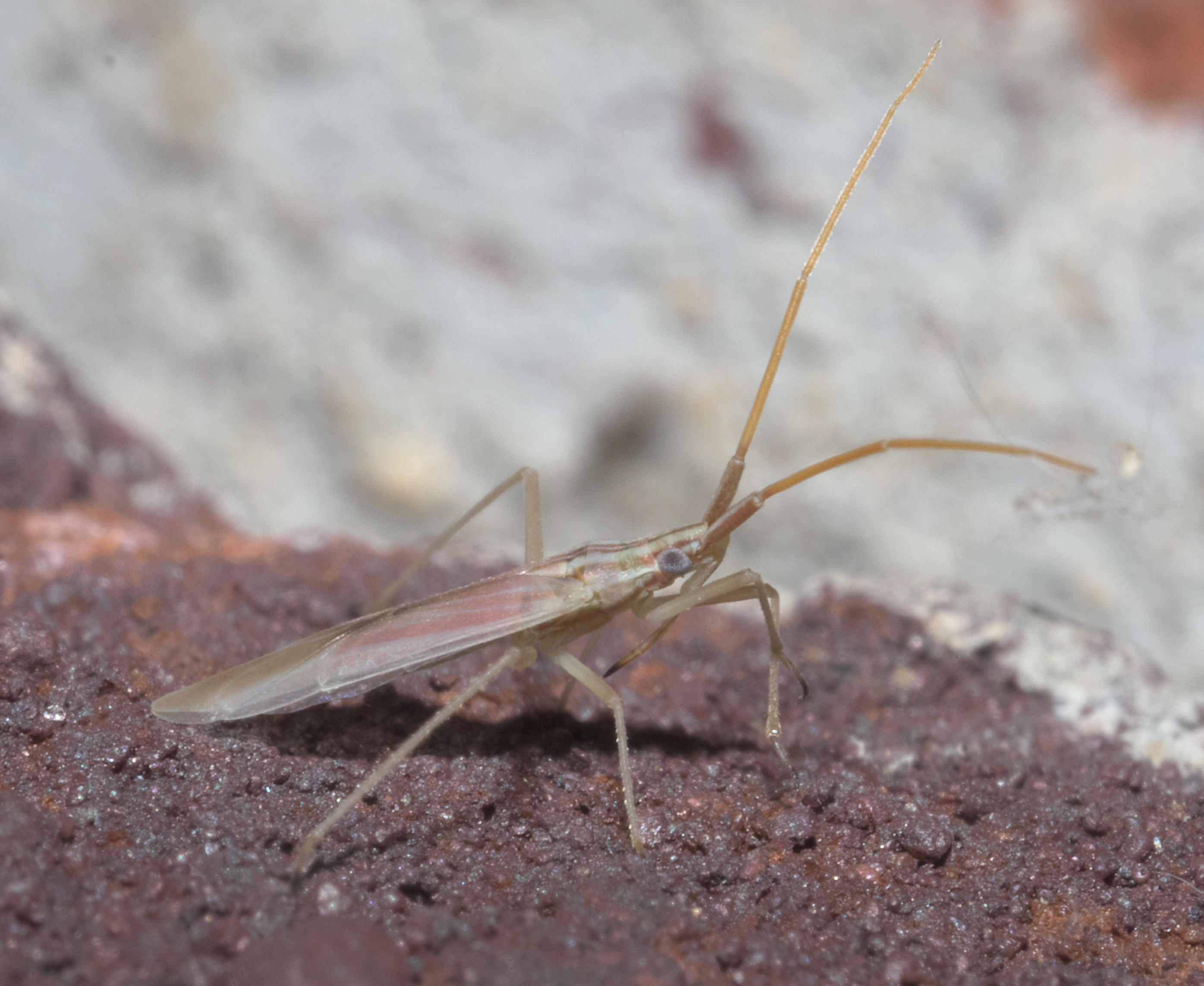
Trigonotylus pulcher

== Species ==
- Trigonotylus americanus Carvalho, 1957
- Trigonotylus antennatus Kelton, 1970
- Trigonotylus brooksi Kelton, 1970
- Trigonotylus caelestialium (Kirkaldy, 1902) (rice leaf bug)
- Trigonotylus canadensis Kelton, 1970
- Trigonotylus confusus Reuter, 1909
- Trigonotylus doddi (Distant, 1904)
- Trigonotylus flavicornis Kelton, 1970
- Trigonotylus hawaiiensis (Kirkaldy, 1902)
- Trigonotylus longipes Slater and Wagner, 1955
- Trigonotylus pulcher Reuter, 1876
- Trigonotylus ruficornis (Geoffroy in Fourcroy, 1785)
- Trigonotylus saileri Carvalho, 1957
- Trigonotylus slateri Carvalho, 1957
- Trigonotylus tarsalis (Reuter, 1876)
- Trigonotylus tenuis (Reuter, 1895)
- Trigonotylus uhleri (Reuter, 1876)
- Trigonotylus usingeri Carvalho, 1952
