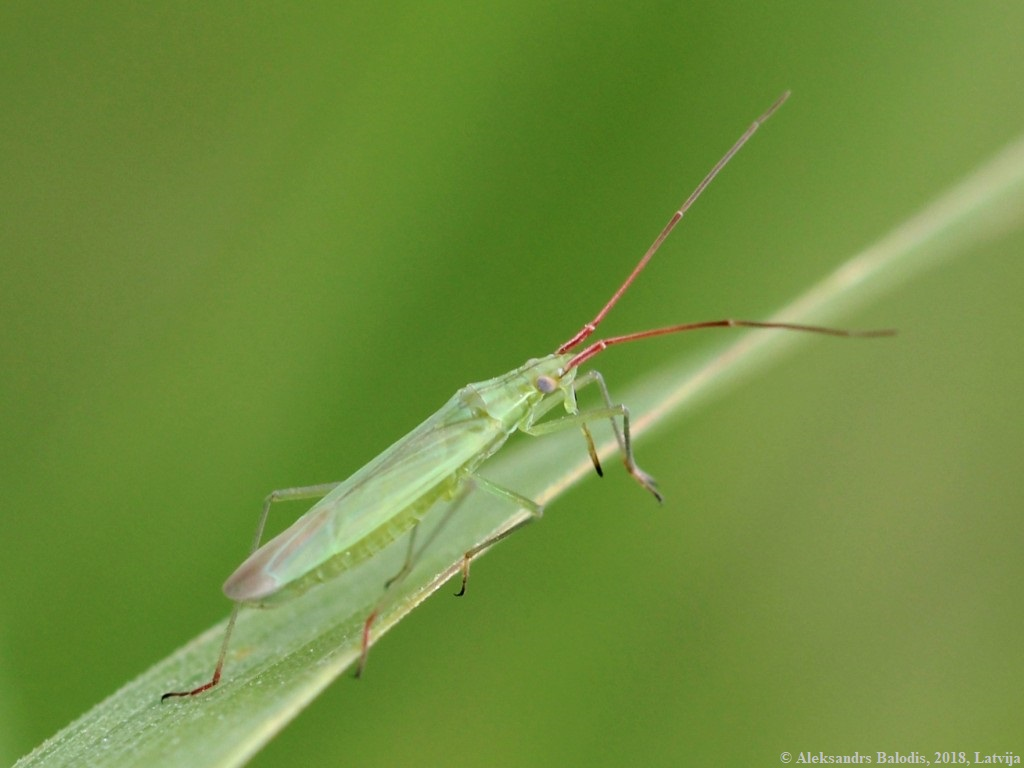
- Trigonotylus ruficornis, Latvia

Scientific classification
- Kingdom: Animalia
- Phylum: Arthropoda
- Class: Insecta
- Order: Hemiptera
- Suborder: Heteroptera
- Family: Miridae
- Genus: Trigonotylus
- Species: T. ruficornis

Binomial name
- Trigonotylus ruficornis (Geoffroy, 1785)

= Trigonotylus ruficornis =

Species of true bug

Trigonotylus ruficornis is a Palearctic species of true bug.
