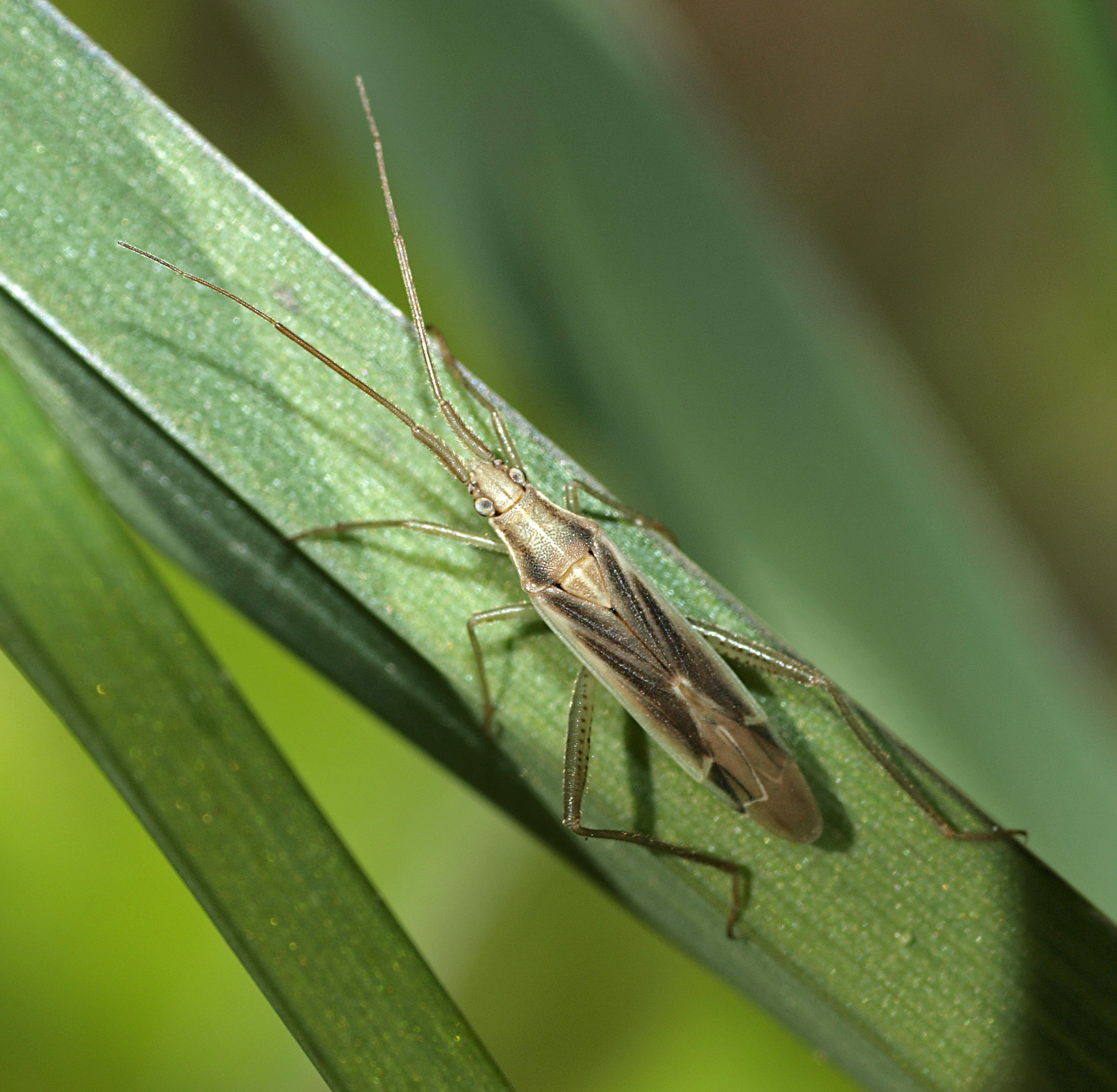

Scientific classification
- Kingdom: Animalia
- Phylum: Arthropoda
- Class: Insecta
- Order: Hemiptera
- Suborder: Heteroptera
- Family: Miridae
- Genus: Stenodema
- Species: S. laevigatum

Binomial name
- Stenodema laevigatum (Linnaeus, 1758)

= Stenodema laevigatum =

Species of true bug

Stenodema laevigatum, or sometimes Stenodema laevigata (also called grass bug), is a species of bug from Miridae family. The species have a gray to brown elongated body, with the eyes located backwards in the head. They sometimes come in green colour, and are 8–10 millimetres (0.31–0.39 in) in length, which makes it a rather big species of its kind. They are common in the United Kingdom, and throughout the rest of Europe. then east across the Palearctic through Asia Minor and the Caucasus to northern China.

== Description ==
Adults are 7–10 millimetres (0.28–0.39 in) long. The species are of light-green colour, but can come in yellow or brown. The species lacks femoral spurs, and have densely pitted prothorax.

== Ecology ==
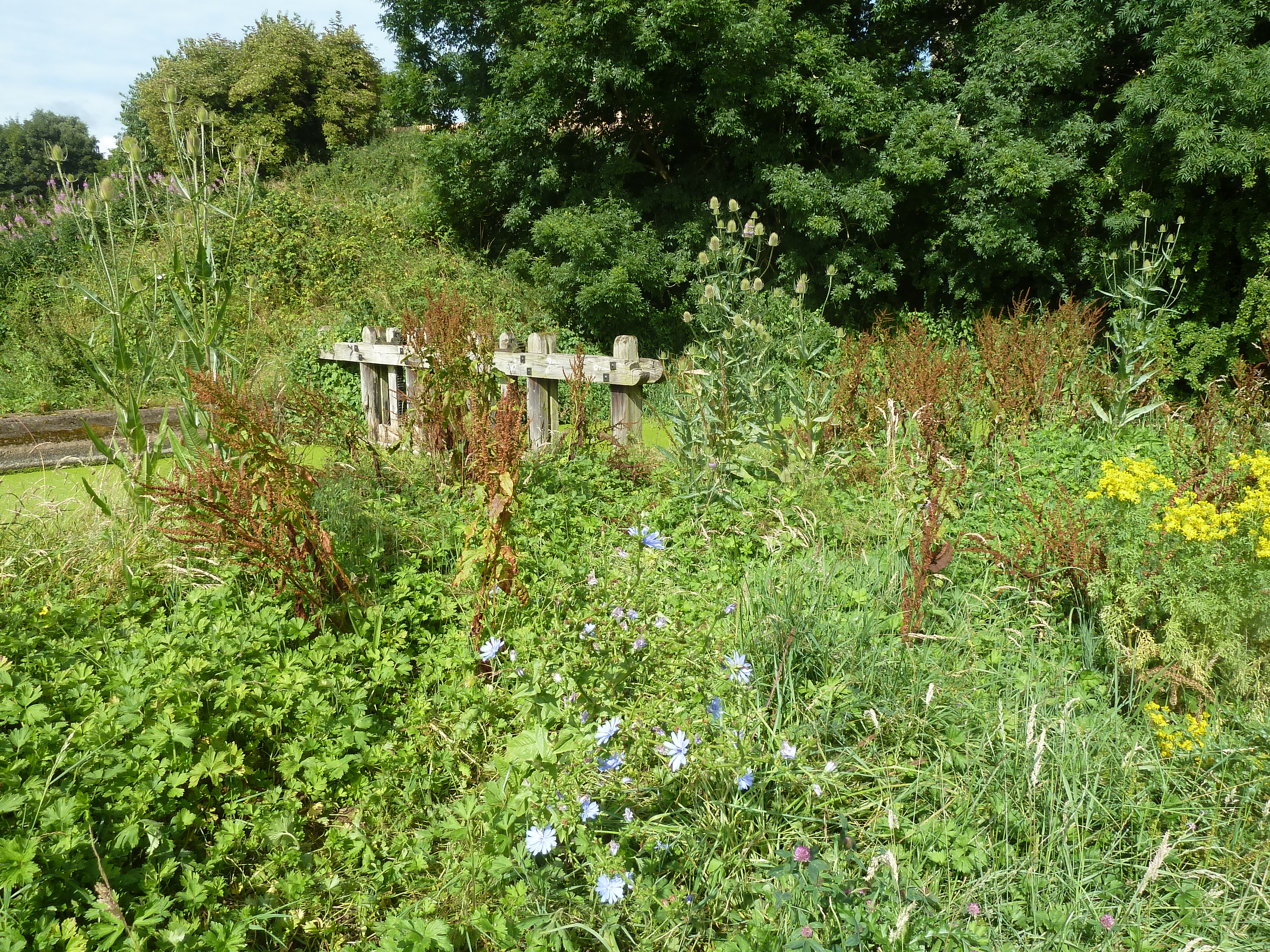
Habitat, Ireland

The larvae are light yellowish and is born in summer, with adults taking over by August. Adults and larvae are both feeding on unripe grains, which includes: Alopecurus, Dactylis, Festuca and wheat. Sometimes, larvae might suck juices from leaves and stems. They start to eat grass seeds and flowers by later development. The larvae hibernate in winter, by living in a soil, and leaf litter. Both males and females mate in spring, with the males being greener than females. The larvae are active from May–July, after which the new generation appears, which will last till next spring.

== Camouflage ==
By autumn, the species turn brown, and start their overwintering. As soon as spring starts, their colour is changes to green, which camouflages them under a grass colour.
