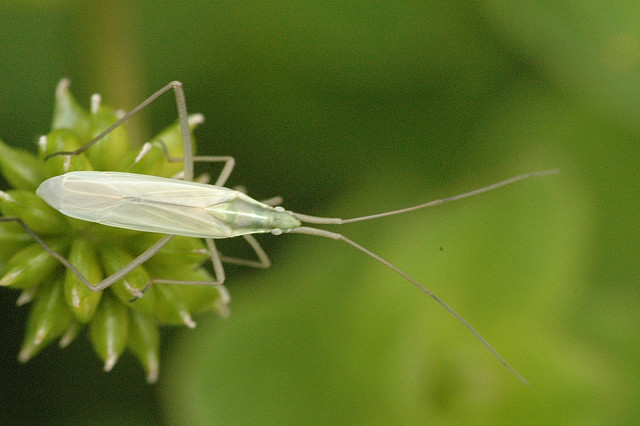

Scientific classification
- Kingdom: Animalia
- Phylum: Arthropoda
- Clade: Pancrustacea
- Class: Insecta
- Order: Hemiptera
- Suborder: Heteroptera
- Family: Miridae
- Genus: Notostira
- Species: N. elongata

Binomial name
- Notostira elongata (Geoffroy, 1785)

Synonyms
- Cimex elongata Geoffroy, 1785

= Notostira elongata =

Species of insect

Notostira elongata is a species of bugs from a Miridae family, subfamily Mirinae. It is found everywhere in Europe except for Albania, Andorra, Bosnia and Herzegovina, various islands (except Britain I., where it is abundant).

== Description ==
Adult size is 7.5–8.0 millimetres (0.30–0.31 in). The species have longitudinal furrow between the eyes, and are yellowish-green. The pronotum is unpunctured and smooth (in comparison with the similar-looking Stenodema species often found in the same region and habitats which have pitted pronotums), with dense dark hairs on both the first antennal segment and the rear tibiae.

== Ecology ==
The species live two generations. The females change colour in fall, by becoming pinker, and larger. Both male and female species mate during winter, following by an egg development in spring.
