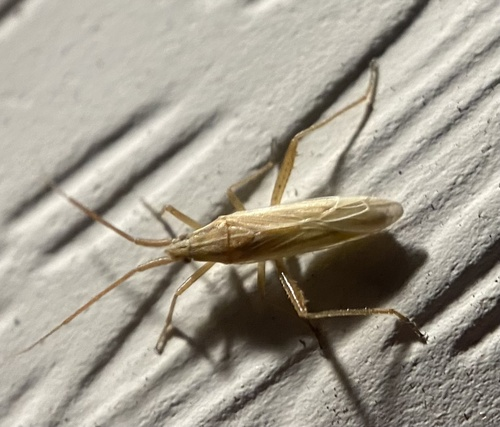

Scientific classification
- Kingdom: Animalia
- Phylum: Arthropoda
- Class: Insecta
- Order: Hemiptera
- Suborder: Heteroptera
- Family: Miridae
- Genus: Stenodema
- Species: S. pilosa

Binomial name
- Stenodema pilosa Jakovlev, 1889

Synonyms
- S. trispinosa (Reuter, 1904)

= Stenodema pilosa =

Species of insect

Stenodema pilosa is a species of plant bug in the family Miridae, first described in 1889. It can be found across transcontinental North America Eurasia.

== Description ==
Species within the genus Stenodema are elongate with a longitudinal furrow between the eyes and are best distinguished by the coarsely and densely pitted prothorax. S. pilosa is about 8–9 mm long and has three spurs on the hind femora. This distinguishes it from other closely related species, notably S. calcarata which has two femoral spurs.

There are two generations per year. Adults which have overwintered and mated in the spring are green with an orange-brown hourglass marking down their back, and those born later in the year are beige or tan. Males are often darker than females.

== Range and habitat ==
This species has been found across transcontinental North America Eurasia and is commonly observed in grassy fields and wetlands.

== Ecology ==
Stenodema pilosa feeds on grasses such as the meadow foxtail, reed canary grass and common reed. They overwinter as adults and emerge in April, and the new generation is complete by August.

== Etymology ==
Formerly treated as a separate species, S. trispinosa was synomized with S. pilosa in 2024. The specific name trispinosa means "three-spined" and refers to the three small spines on its femurs.
