= Teratocoris =

Scientific classification
- Kingdom: Animalia
- Phylum: Arthropoda
- Clade: Pancrustacea
- Class: Insecta
- Order: Hemiptera
- Suborder: Heteroptera
- Family: Miridae
- Subfamily: Mirinae
- Tribe: Stenodemini
- Genus: Teratocoris; Fieber, 1858

Genus of true bugs

Teratocoris is a genus of plant bugs in the family Miridae. Species are recorded from the Palaearctic and Nearctic realms.

== Species ==
BioLib includes:

1. Teratocoris antennatus (Boheman, 1852)
  - type species (as Capsus antennatus Boheman, 1852)
2. Teratocoris borealis Kelton, 1966
3. Teratocoris caricis Kirkaldy, 1909
4. Teratocoris depressus Kerzhner, 1979
5. Teratocoris discolor Uhler, 1887
6. Teratocoris herbaticus Schmidt
7. Teratocoris paludum Sahlberg, 1870
8. Teratocoris saundersi Douglas & Scott, 1869
9. Teratocoris tagoi Yasunaga & Schwartz, 2005
10. Teratocoris ussuriensis Kerzhner, 1988
11. Teratocoris viridis Douglas & Scott, 1867
