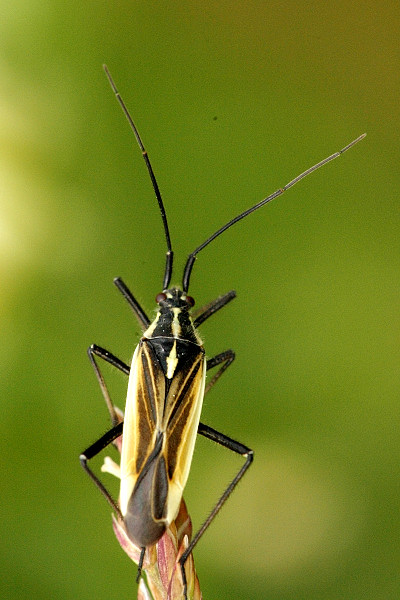
- Male meadow plant bug

Scientific classification
- Kingdom: Animalia
- Phylum: Arthropoda
- Class: Insecta
- Order: Hemiptera
- Suborder: Heteroptera
- Family: Miridae
- Genus: Leptopterna
- Species: L. dolabrata

Binomial name
- Leptopterna dolabrata (Linnaeus, 1758)

= Leptopterna dolabrata =

Species of true bug

Leptopterna dolabrata (Miris dolabratus), commonly known as the meadow plant bug, is an insect in the Miridae family. It is commonly found in grassy areas in almost all of Europe to the northern Mediterranean and east across Asia Minor to the Caspian Sea region. It is an adventive species in North America . It feeds on developing grass seeds, causing seed heads to shrivel and prematurely whiten. It is regarded as a pest wherever grass is grown for seed. The species has long antennae and is black coloured.
