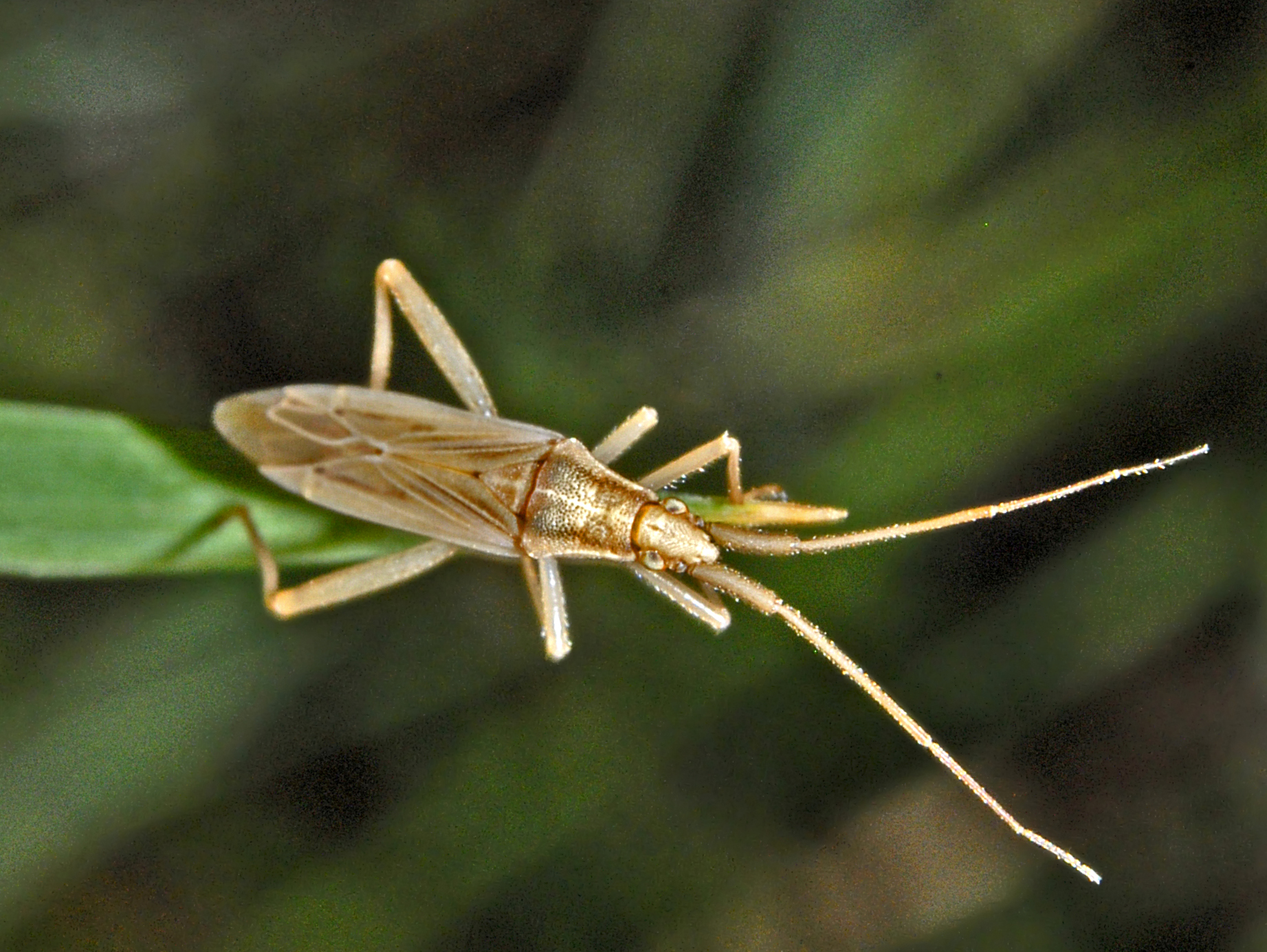
- Stenodema holsata

Scientific classification
- Kingdom: Animalia
- Phylum: Arthropoda
- Class: Insecta
- Order: Hemiptera
- Suborder: Heteroptera
- Family: Miridae
- Genus: Stenodema
- Species: S. holsata

Binomial name
- Stenodema holsata Fabricius, 1787

= Stenodema holsata =

Species of true bug

Stenodema holsata is a species of bug from the family Miridae.

== Description ==
Stenodema holsata can reach a length of 6–7 millimetres (0.24–0.28 in). These bugs have an elongate body and a coarsely pitted pronotum. The head shows a longitudinal small furrow. The first antennal segment has short hairs. The basic coloration before wintering is yellow-brown in females and dark brown in males, with brown longitudinal markings. In spring both sexes turn green, but the males remain darker.

== Ecology ==
This species overwinter as an adult. In spring these bugs mate and larvae can be found from May to July. The new generation of adults appears from July onwards. Adults feed on Purple Moor-grass (Molinia caerulea).

== Distribution ==
This species is widespread in most of Europe, up to Siberia, Asia Minor, Central Asia and China. It can be found throughout the United Kingdom, except for South East England.

== Bibliography ==
- Coulianos, C.-C. 1998. Annotated Catalogue of the Hemiptera-Heteroptera of Norway. Fauna Norv. Ser.B 45 (1-2), side 11-39
- Gaun, Sven 1974. Blomsterteger (Miridae). Danmarks Fauna 81, 279
- Frieder Sauer: Sauers Naturführer Wanzen und Zikaden nach Farbfotos erkannt. Fauna, Keltern 1996, ISBN 3923010125.
- Ekkehard Wachmann, Albert Melber, Jürgen Deckert: Wanzen. Band 2: Cimicomorpha: Microphysidae, Miridae. Goecke & Evers, Keltern 2006, ISBN 3-931374-57-2.
