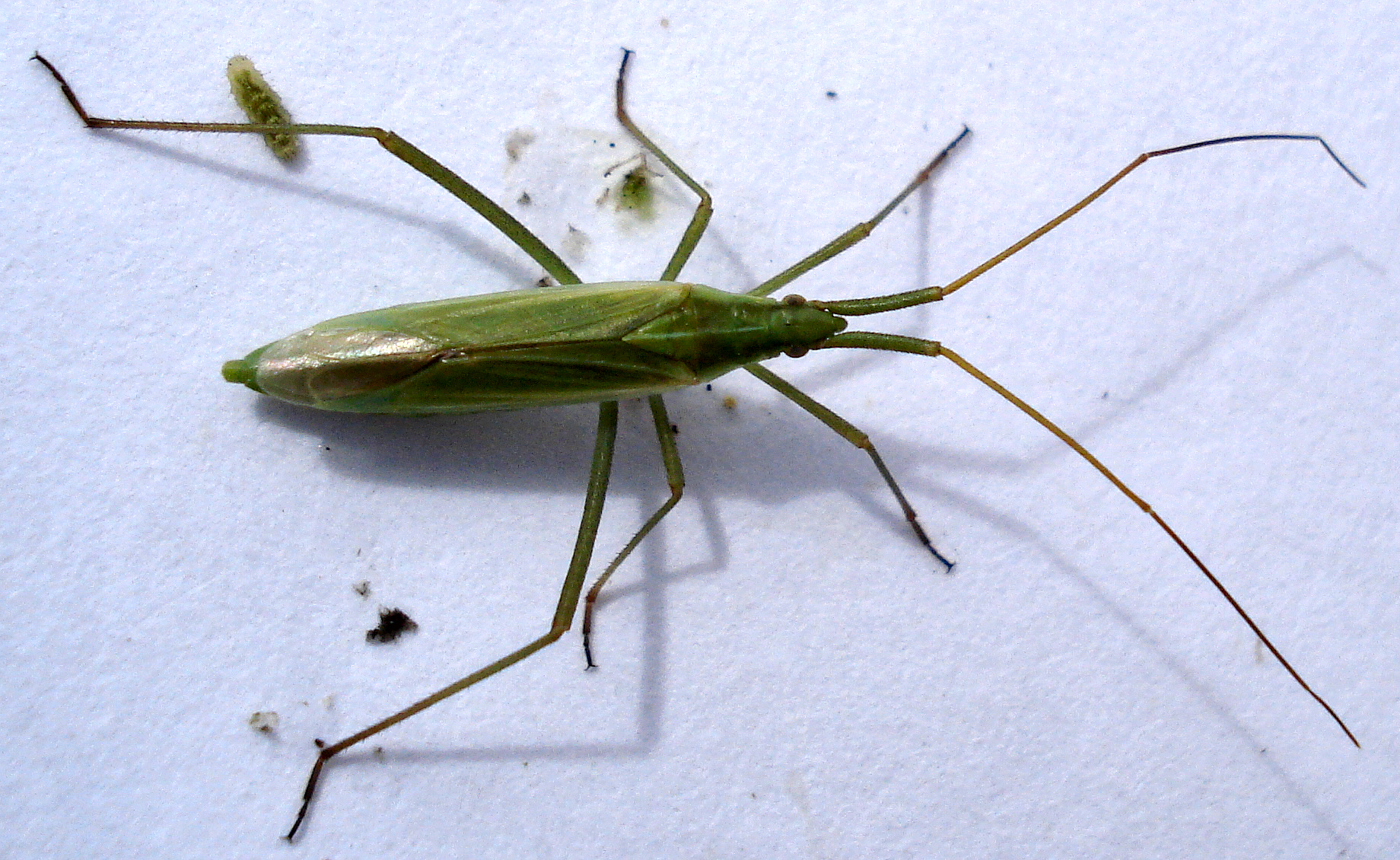
- Megaloceroea recticornis

Scientific classification
- Kingdom: Animalia
- Phylum: Arthropoda
- Clade: Pancrustacea
- Class: Insecta
- Order: Hemiptera
- Suborder: Heteroptera
- Family: Miridae
- Subfamily: Mirinae
- Tribe: Stenodemini
- Genus: Megaloceroea; Fieber, 1858

= Megaloceroea =

Genus of true bugs

Megaloceroea is a genus of plant bugs in the family Miridae. There are at least three described species in Megaloceroea.

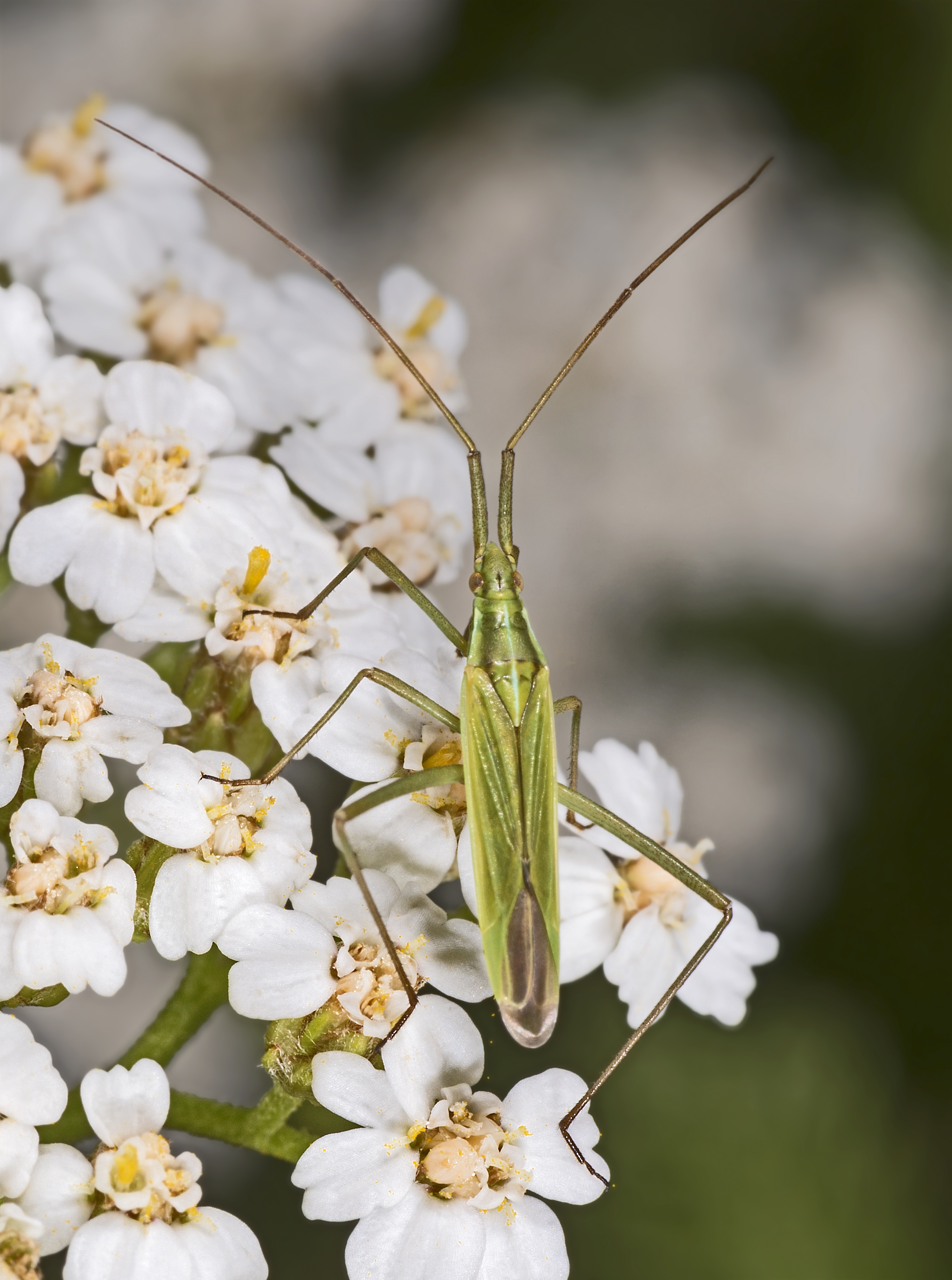
Megaloceroea recticornis

== Species ==
These three species belong to the genus Megaloceroea:

- Megaloceroea punctata Knight
- Megaloceroea recticornis (Geoffroy in Fourcroy, 1785)
- Megaloceroea rubicunda Schmidt
