= Autumnimiris =

Scientific classification
- Kingdom: Animalia
- Phylum: Arthropoda
- Clade: Pancrustacea
- Class: Insecta
- Order: Hemiptera
- Suborder: Heteroptera
- Family: Miridae
- Subfamily: Mirinae
- Tribe: Stenodemini
- Genus: Autumnimiris; Schwartz, 1989

Genus of true bugs

Autumnimiris is a genus of plant bugs in the family Miridae. There are about six described species in Autumnimiris.

== Species ==
These six species belong to the genus Autumnimiris:

- Autumnimiris albescens (Van Duzee, 1925)
- Autumnimiris guadalupe Schwartz, 1989
- Autumnimiris koebelei (Van Duzee, 1921)
- Autumnimiris koebeli (Van Duzee, 1921)
- Autumnimiris roseus (Distant, 1883)
- Autumnimiris rubicundus (Uhler, 1872)
