= Litomiris debilis =

Scientific classification
- Kingdom: Animalia
- Phylum: Arthropoda
- Class: Insecta
- Order: Hemiptera
- Suborder: Heteroptera
- Family: Miridae
- Genus: Litomiris
- Species: L. debilis

Binomial name
- Litomiris debilis (Uhler, 1871)

Species of true bug

Litomiris debilis is a species of bug from the family Miridae. It is yellowish-orange, with black antennae.
