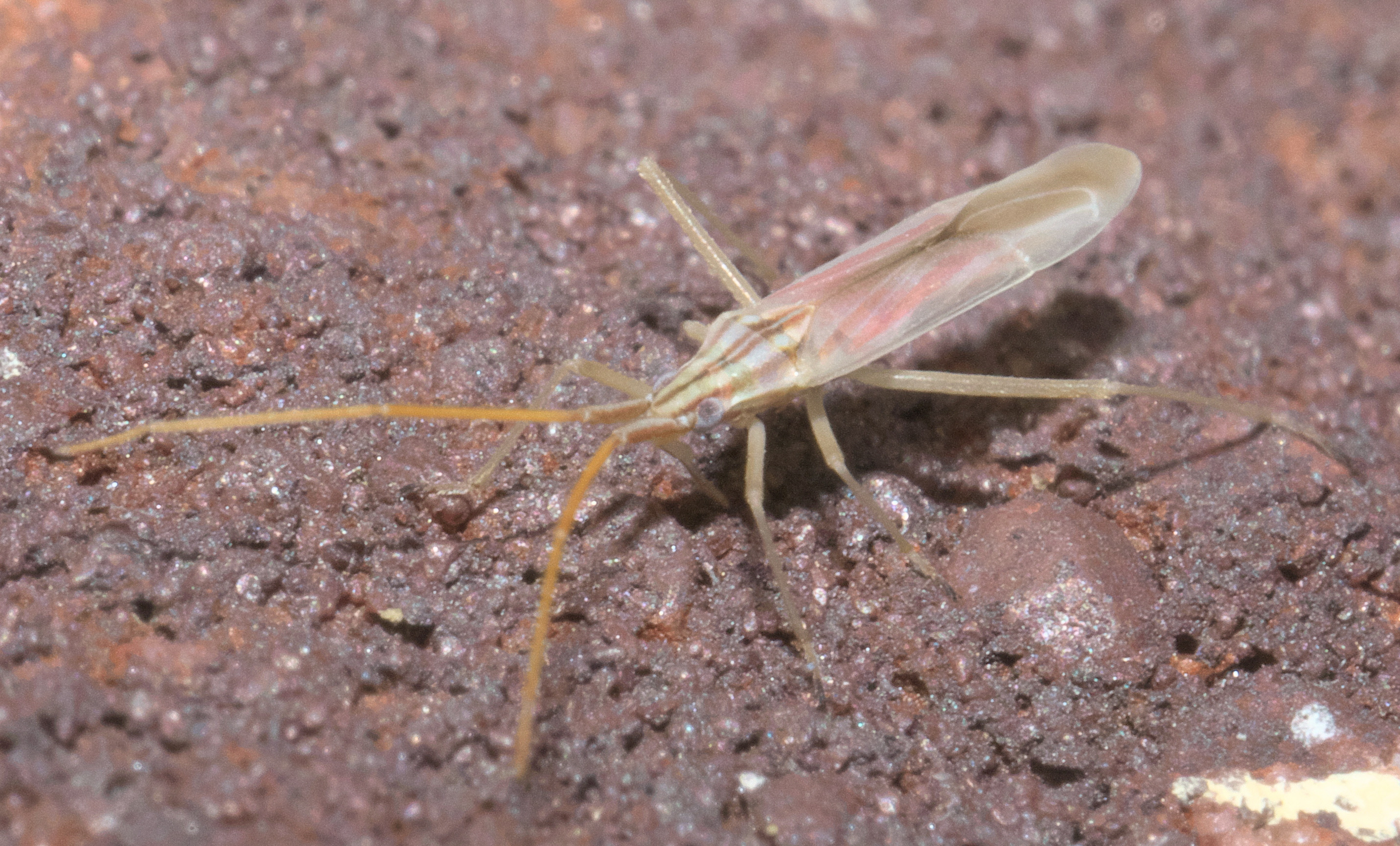

Scientific classification
- Kingdom: Animalia
- Phylum: Arthropoda
- Class: Insecta
- Order: Hemiptera
- Suborder: Heteroptera
- Family: Miridae
- Genus: Trigonotylus
- Species: T. pulcher

Binomial name
- Trigonotylus pulcher Reuter, 1876

= Trigonotylus pulcher =

Species of true bug

Trigonotylus pulcher is a species of plant bug in the family Miridae. It is found in Central America and North America.

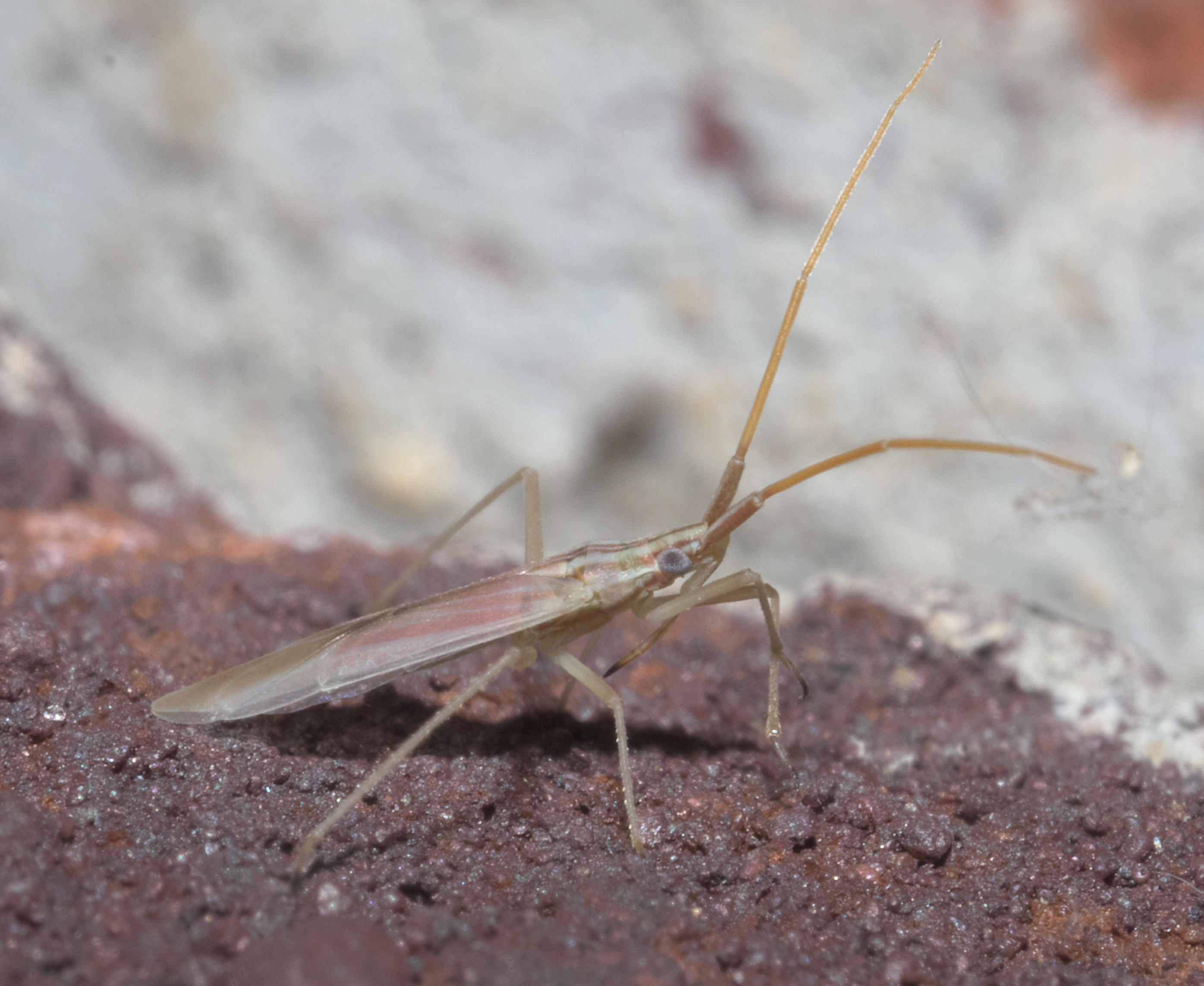
Trigonotylus pulcher, Pryor, OK, USA
