= Porpomiris =

Scientific classification
- Kingdom: Animalia
- Phylum: Arthropoda
- Clade: Pancrustacea
- Class: Insecta
- Order: Hemiptera
- Suborder: Heteroptera
- Family: Miridae
- Subfamily: Mirinae
- Tribe: Stenodemini
- Genus: Porpomiris; Berg, 1883

Synonyms
- Mesomiris Reuter, 1909

Genus of true bugs

Porpomiris is a genus of plant bugs in the family Miridae. There are at least three described species in Porpomiris.

== Species ==
These three species belong to the genus Porpomiris:

- Porpomiris campinensis Carvalho, 1947
- Porpomiris curtulus (Reuter, 1909)
- Porpomiris picturatus Berg, 1883
