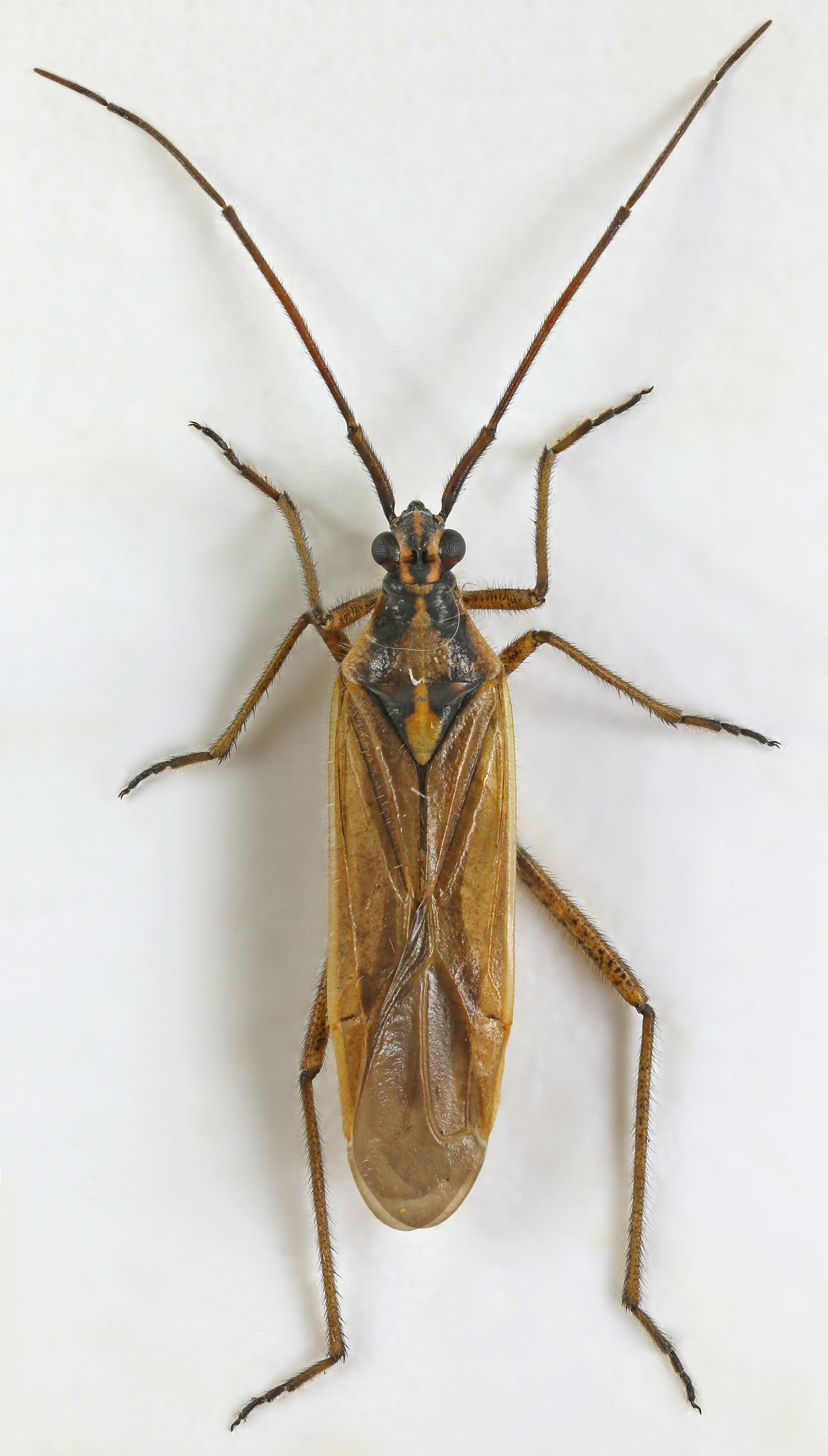

Scientific classification
- Kingdom: Animalia
- Phylum: Arthropoda
- Class: Insecta
- Order: Hemiptera
- Suborder: Heteroptera
- Family: Miridae
- Genus: Leptopterna
- Species: L. ferrugata

Binomial name
- Leptopterna ferrugata (Fallén, 1807)

= Leptopterna ferrugata =

Species of true bug

Leptopterna ferrugata is a species of plant bug in the family Miridae. It is found in Europe to the east to Siberia and in the south to the northern Mediterranean basin and to Asia Minor. It is an adventive species in North America.

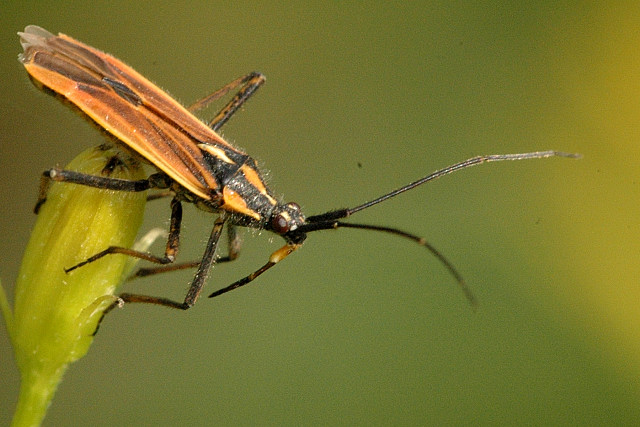
