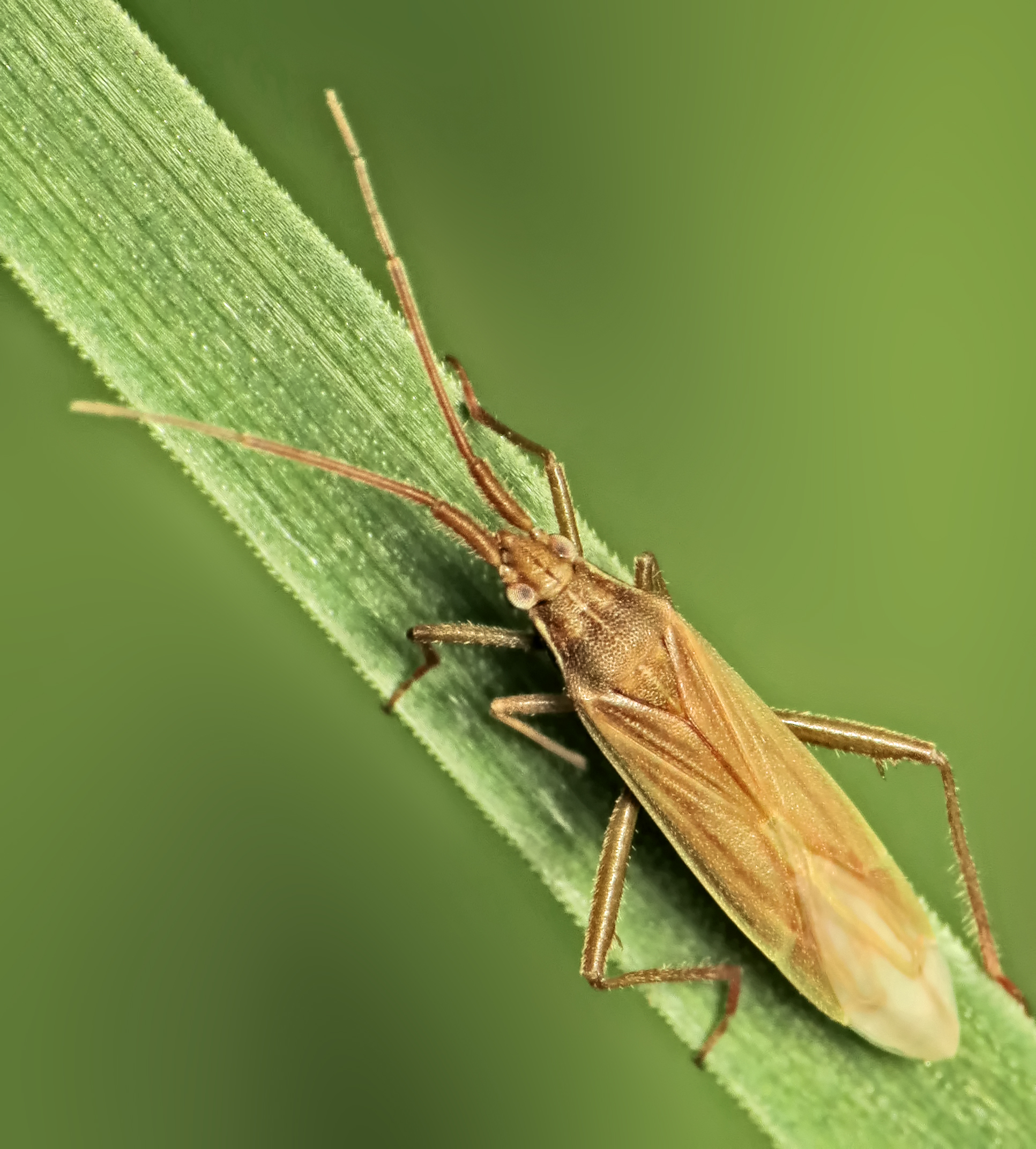
- Stenodema calcarata. Note the twin spines on the hind femur which are the key characteristic of this species.

Scientific classification
- Kingdom: Animalia
- Phylum: Arthropoda
- Clade: Pancrustacea
- Class: Insecta
- Order: Hemiptera
- Suborder: Heteroptera
- Family: Miridae
- Genus: Stenodema
- Species: S. calcarata

Binomial name
- Stenodema calcarata Fallén, 1807

= Stenodema calcarata =

Species of true bug

Stenodema calcarata, also known as the two-spined grass bug, is a species of bug from Miridae family, that can be found in Europe and across the Palearctic to Central Asia, the Russian Far East, Siberia, northern China, Korea and Japan.

== Description ==
The length of an adult is 7–8 millimetres (0.28–0.31 in), and have a longitudinal furrow between the eyes.

== Ecology ==
Stenodema calcarata lives on grasses including Agrostis tenuis, Alopecurus pratensis, Festuca and in bogs Molinia caerulea and many other grasses (Poaceae), and also on (Cyperaceae) and (Juncaceae), such as sedges Carex, Scirpus and Juncus. The species hibernates in winter, and come aground in April. During this time, the females start to change colour to green, while males still remain yellow, or brown. The larvae appears by August.
