= Chaetofoveolocoris =

Scientific classification
- Kingdom: Animalia
- Phylum: Arthropoda
- Clade: Pancrustacea
- Class: Insecta
- Order: Hemiptera
- Suborder: Heteroptera
- Family: Miridae
- Subfamily: Mirinae
- Tribe: Stenodemini
- Genus: Chaetofoveolocoris; Knight, 1968

Genus of true bugs

Chaetofoveolocoris is a genus of plant bugs in the family Miridae. There are at least two described species in Chaetofoveolocoris.

== Species ==
These two species belong to the genus Chaetofoveolocoris:

- Chaetofoveolocoris hirsutus (Knight, 1968)
- Chaetofoveolocoris parsoni Schwartz, 1989
