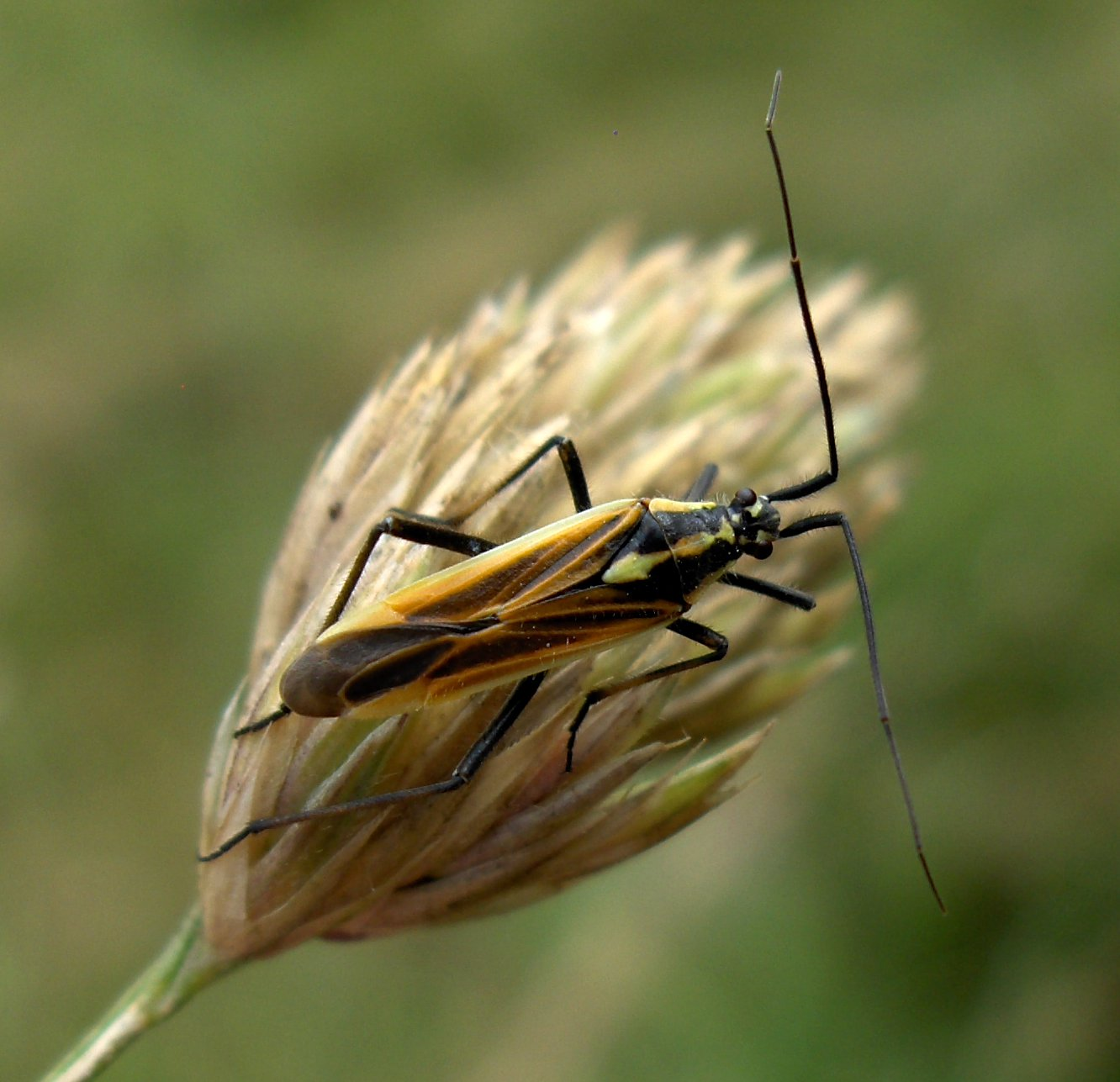
- Leptopterna dolabrata

Scientific classification
- Kingdom: Animalia
- Phylum: Arthropoda
- Class: Insecta
- Order: Hemiptera
- Suborder: Heteroptera
- Family: Miridae
- Tribe: Stenodemini
- Genus: Leptopterna; Fieber, 1858

Type species
- Leptopterna dolabrata Linnaeus, 1758

Species
- See text

Synonyms
- Lopomorphus Douglas and Scott 1865

= Leptopterna =

Genus of true bugs

Leptopterna is a genus of plant bugs in the Miridae family.

== List of species ==
- Leptopterna albescens (Reuter, 1891)
- Leptopterna amoena Uhler, 1872
- Leptopterna dentifera Linnavuori, 1970
- Leptopterna dolabrata (Linnaeus, 1758)
- Leptopterna emeljanovi Vinokurov, 1982
- Leptopterna euxina Vinokurov, 1982
- Leptopterna ferrugata (Fallén, 1807)
- Leptopterna griesheimae Wagner, 1952
- Leptopterna pilosa Reuter, 1880

=== Former species ===
- Leptopterna silacea Bliven 1973 junior synonym of Leptopterna amoena Uhler, 1872
