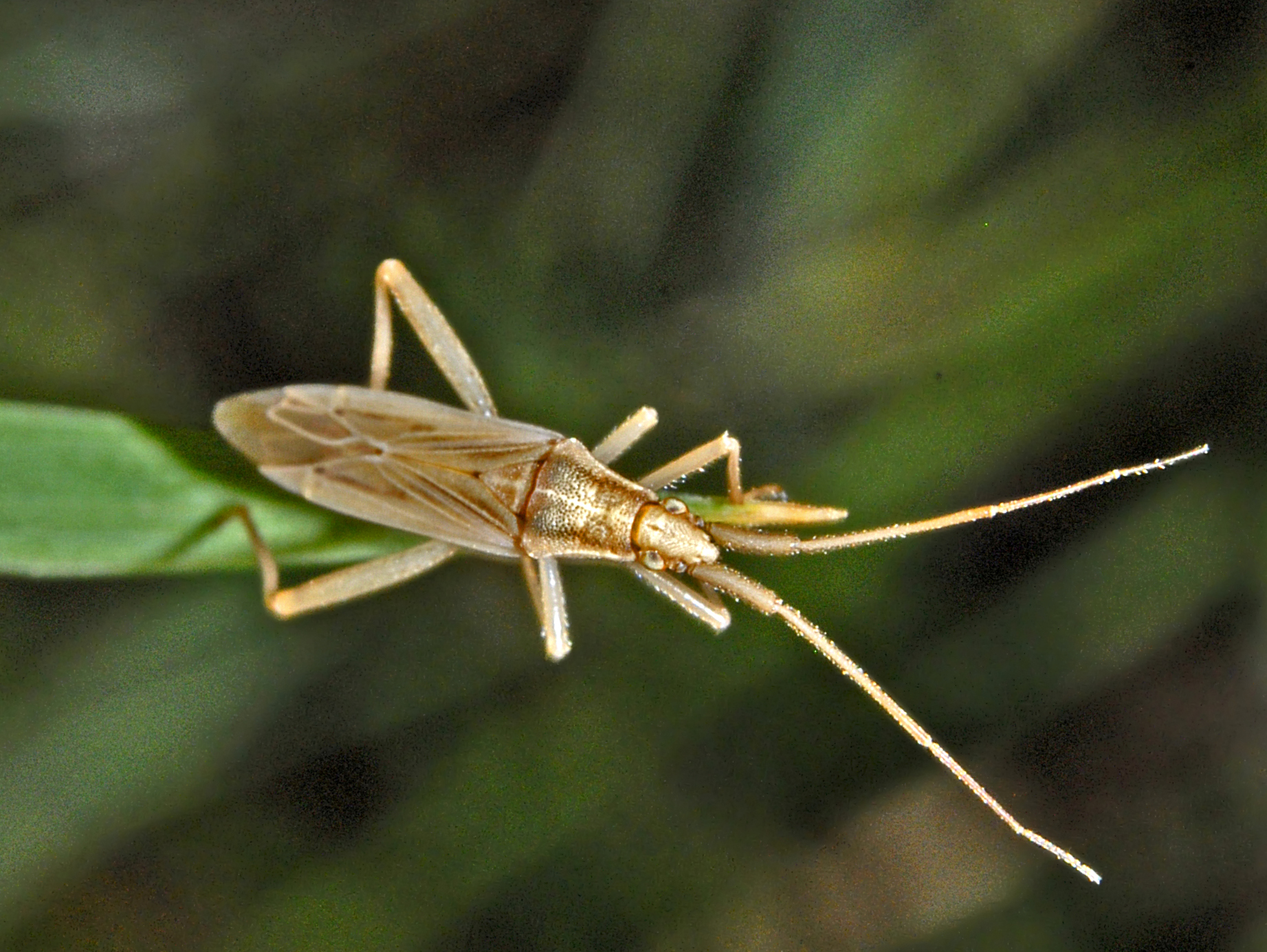
- Stenodema holsata

Scientific classification
- Kingdom: Animalia
- Phylum: Arthropoda
- Class: Insecta
- Order: Hemiptera
- Suborder: Heteroptera
- Family: Miridae
- Tribe: Stenodemini
- Genus: Stenodema; Laporte, 1833

= Stenodema =

Genus of true bugs

Stenodema is a genus of Palaearctic, Oriental and Nearctic plant bugs in the family Miridae and the tribe Stenodemini.

video

== Species ==
According to BioLib the following are included:

subgenus Brachystira Fieber, 1858

1. Stenodema calcarata (Fallén, 1807)
2. Stenodema pilosa (Jakovlev, 1889)

subgenus Stenodema Laporte, 1833

1. Stenodema algoviensis Schmidt, 1934
2. Stenodema alpestris Reuter, 1904
3. Stenodema alticola Zheng, 1981
4. Stenodema angustala Zheng, 1981
5. Stenodema antennata Zheng, 1981
6. Stenodema brevinotum C.S. Lin, 1998
7. Stenodema chinensis (Reuter, 1904)
8. Stenodema crassipes Kiritshenko, 1931
9. Stenodema curticollis (A. Costa, 1852)
10. Stenodema curva Nonnaizab & Qi, 1996
11. Stenodema daliensis Zheng, 1992
12. Stenodema deserta Nonnaizab & Jorigtoo, 1994
13. Stenodema dorsalis Say, 1832
14. Stenodema elegans Reuter, 1904
15. Stenodema falki Bliven, 1958
16. Stenodema guentheri Heiss & J. Ribes, 2007
17. Stenodema holsata (Fabricius, 1787)
18. Stenodema hsiaoi L.Y. Zheng, 1981
19. Stenodema imperii Bliven, 1958
20. Stenodema khenteica Muminov, 1989
21. Stenodema laevigatum (Linnaeus, 1758)
22. Stenodema longicollis Poppius, 1915
23. Stenodema longula L.Y. Zheng, 1981
24. Stenodema mongolica Nonnaizab & Jorigtoo, 1994
25. Stenodema nigricallum Zheng, 1981
26. Stenodema parvula Zheng, 1981
27. Stenodema pilosipes Kelton, 1961
28. Stenodema plebeja Reuter, 1904
29. Stenodema qinlingensis Tang, 1994
30. Stenodema rubrinervis Horváth, 1905
31. Stenodema sequoiae Bliven, 1955
32. Stenodema sericans (Fieber, 1861)
33. Stenodema sibirica Bergroth, 1914
34. Stenodema tibetum Zheng, 1981
35. Stenodema turanica Reuter, 1904
36. Stenodema vicinus Provancher, 1872
37. Stenodema virens (Linnaeus, 1767)
  - type species (as Miris virens L.)

unplaced species

1. Stenodema andina Carvalho, 1975
2. Stenodema argentina Carvalho, 1975
3. Stenodema columbiensis (Carvalho, 1985)
4. Stenodema dohrni (Stål, 1859)
5. Stenodema fritzi Carvalho & Carpintero, 1990
6. Stenodema golbachi Carvalho & Carpintero, 1990
7. Stenodema guaraniana Carvalho, 1975
8. Stenodema insuavis (Stål, 1860)
9. Stenodema javanicum Poppius, 1914
10. Stenodema laolaonsis (Carvalho, 1985)
11. Stenodema longicuneatus (Carvalho & Rosas, 1966)
12. Stenodema noaensis Carvalho & Carpintero, 1990
13. Stenodema panamensis (Distant, 1893)
14. Stenodema praecelsa (Distant, 1891)

== Gallery ==
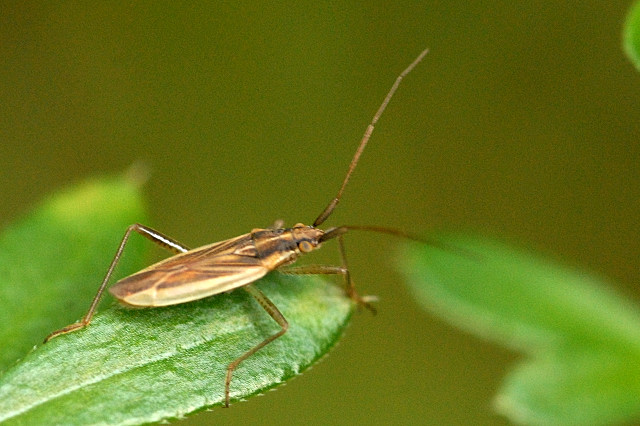
Stenodema holsata

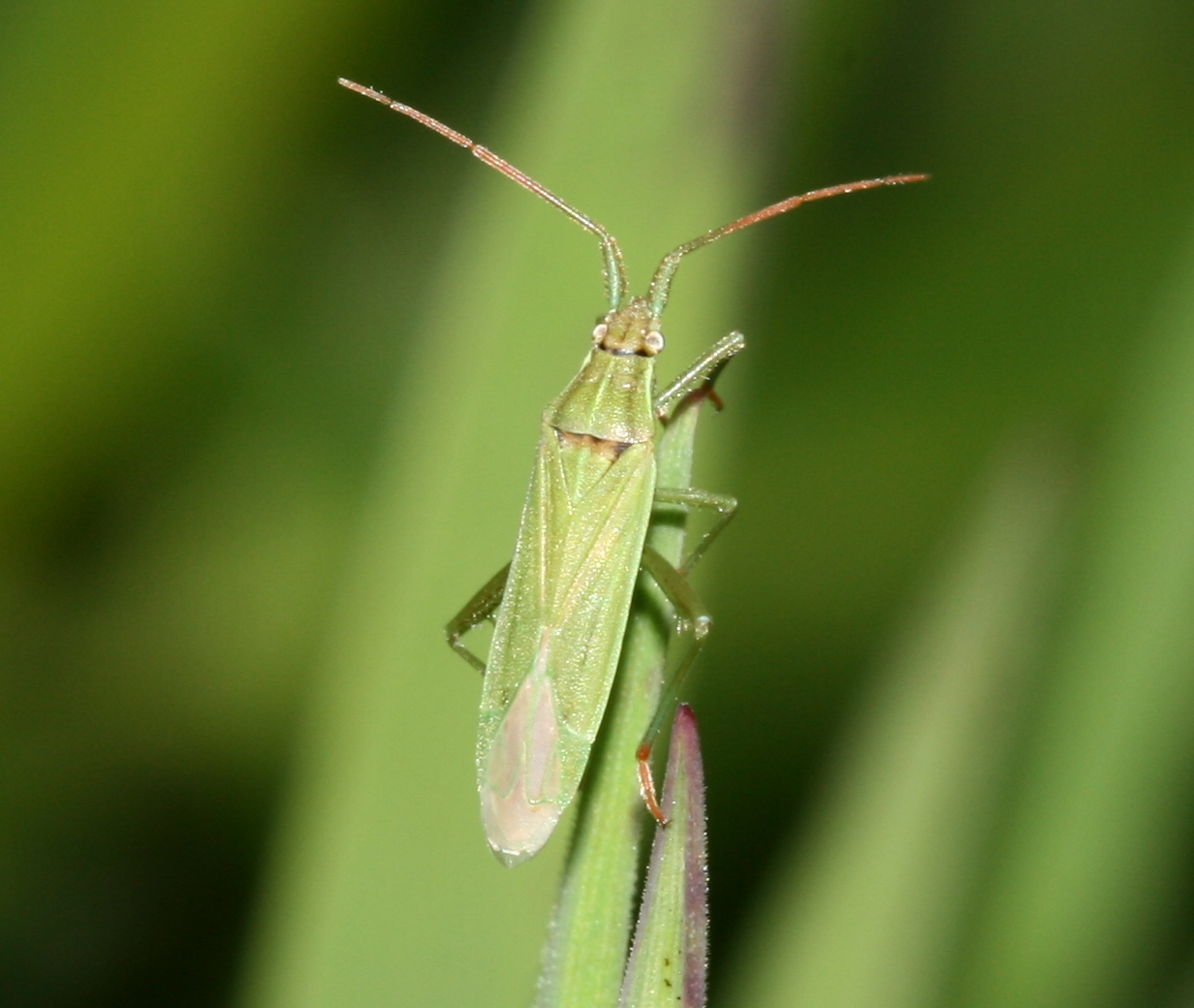
Stenodema calcarata

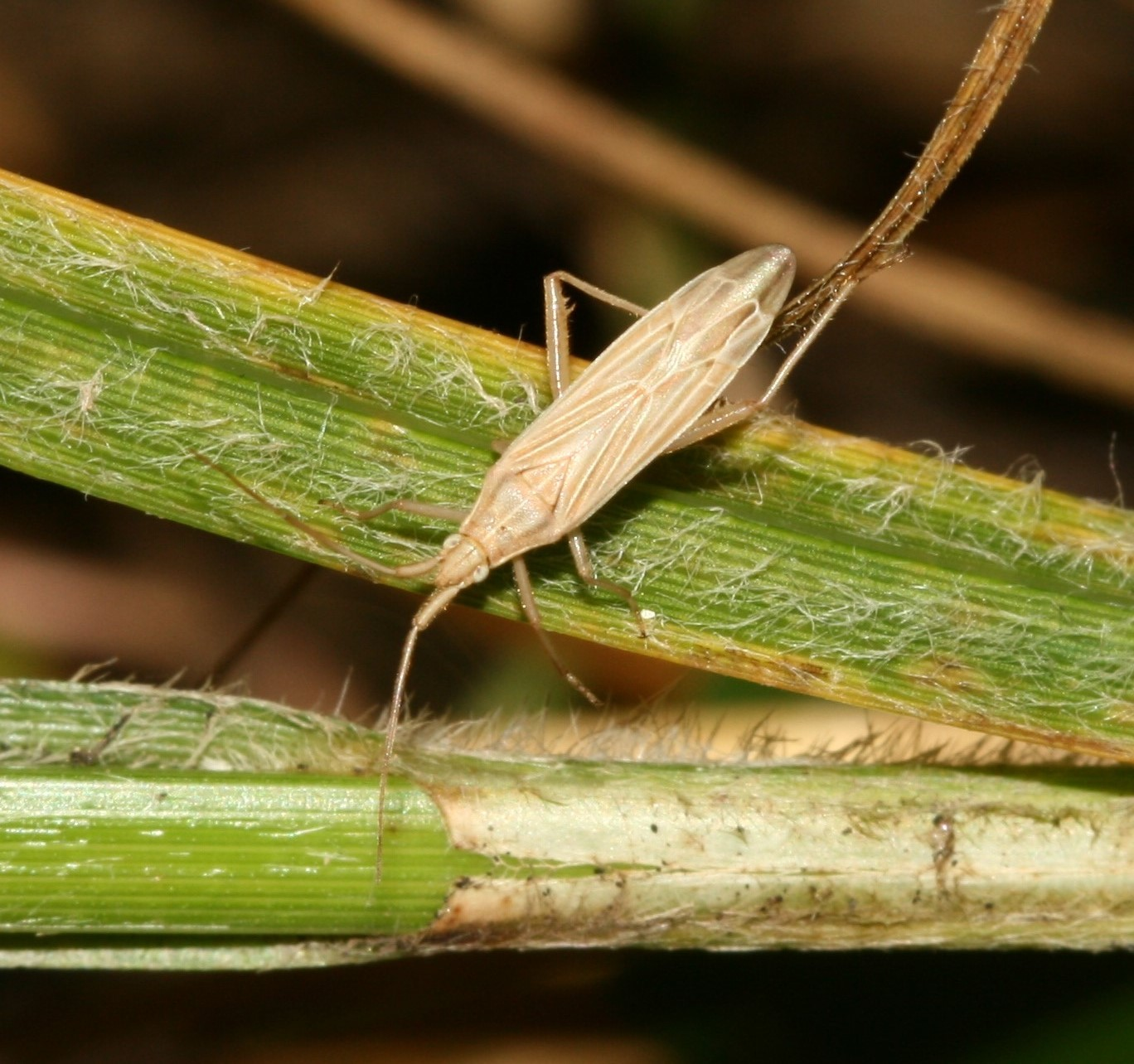
Stenodema calcarata

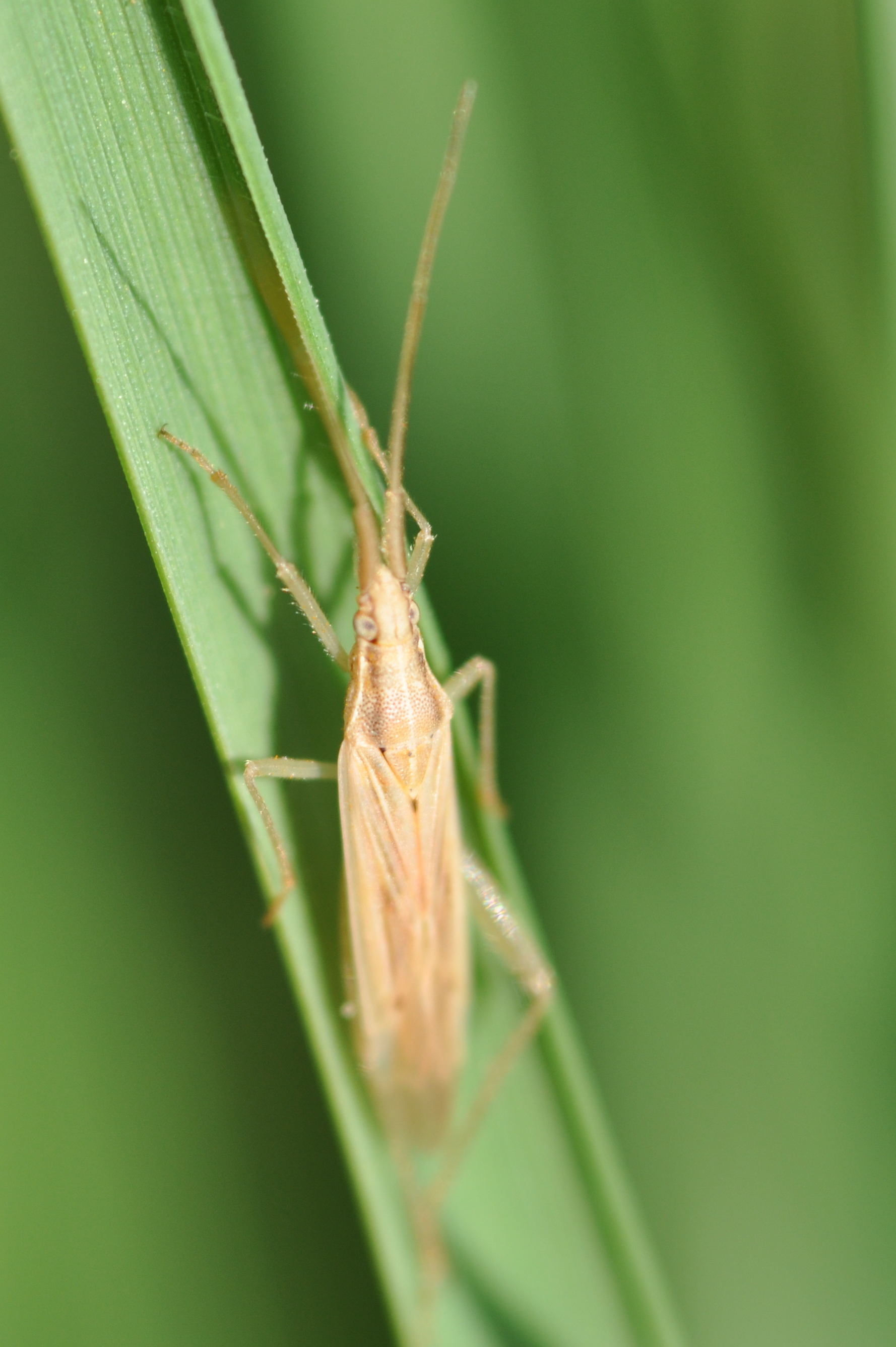
Stenodema laevigata

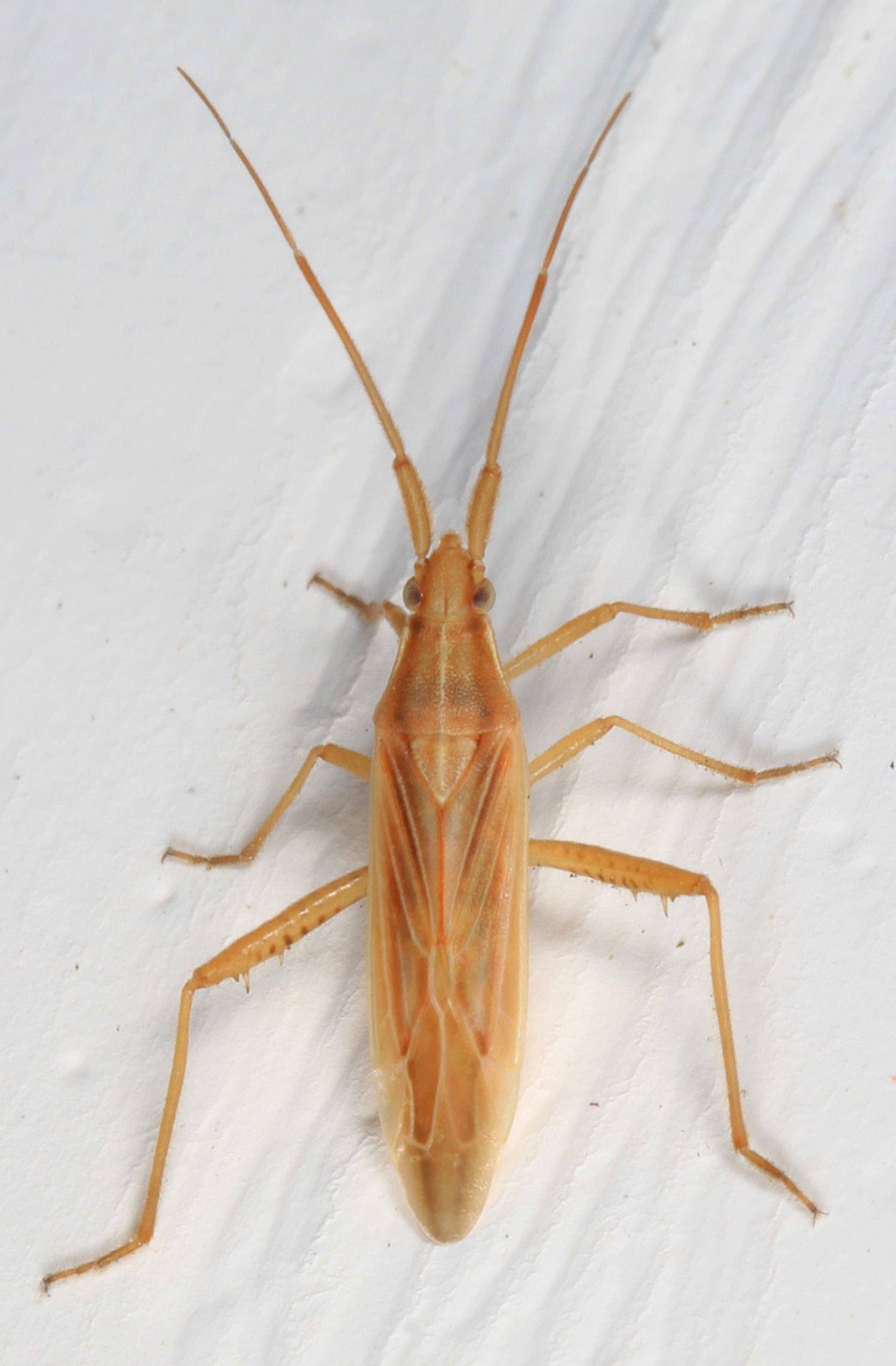
Stenodema trispinosum
