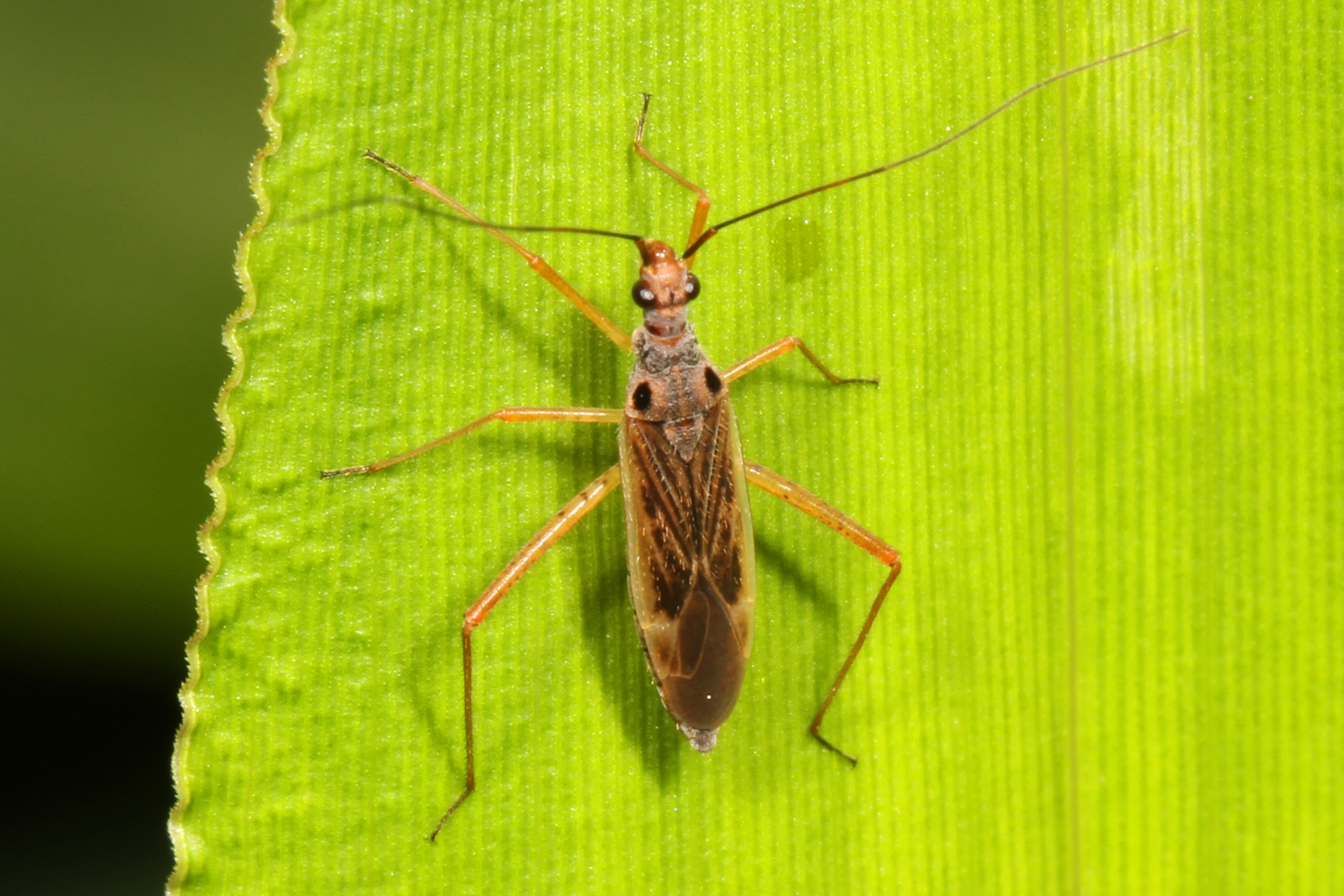
- Collaria oculata

Scientific classification
- Kingdom: Animalia
- Phylum: Arthropoda
- Class: Insecta
- Order: Hemiptera
- Suborder: Heteroptera
- Family: Miridae
- Subfamily: Mirinae
- Tribe: Stenodemini
- Genus: Collaria; Provancher, 1872

= Collaria (bug) =

Genus of true bugs

Collaria is a genus of plant bugs in the family Miridae. There are at least 3 described species in Collaria.

== Species ==
- Collaria meilleurii Provancher, 1872
- Collaria oculata (Reuter, 1876)
- Collaria oleosa (Distant, 1883)
