= Notostira =

Scientific classification
- Domain: Eukaryota
- Kingdom: Animalia
- Phylum: Arthropoda
- Class: Insecta
- Order: Hemiptera
- Suborder: Heteroptera
- Family: Miridae
- Genus: Notostira; Fieber, 1858

Genus of true bugs

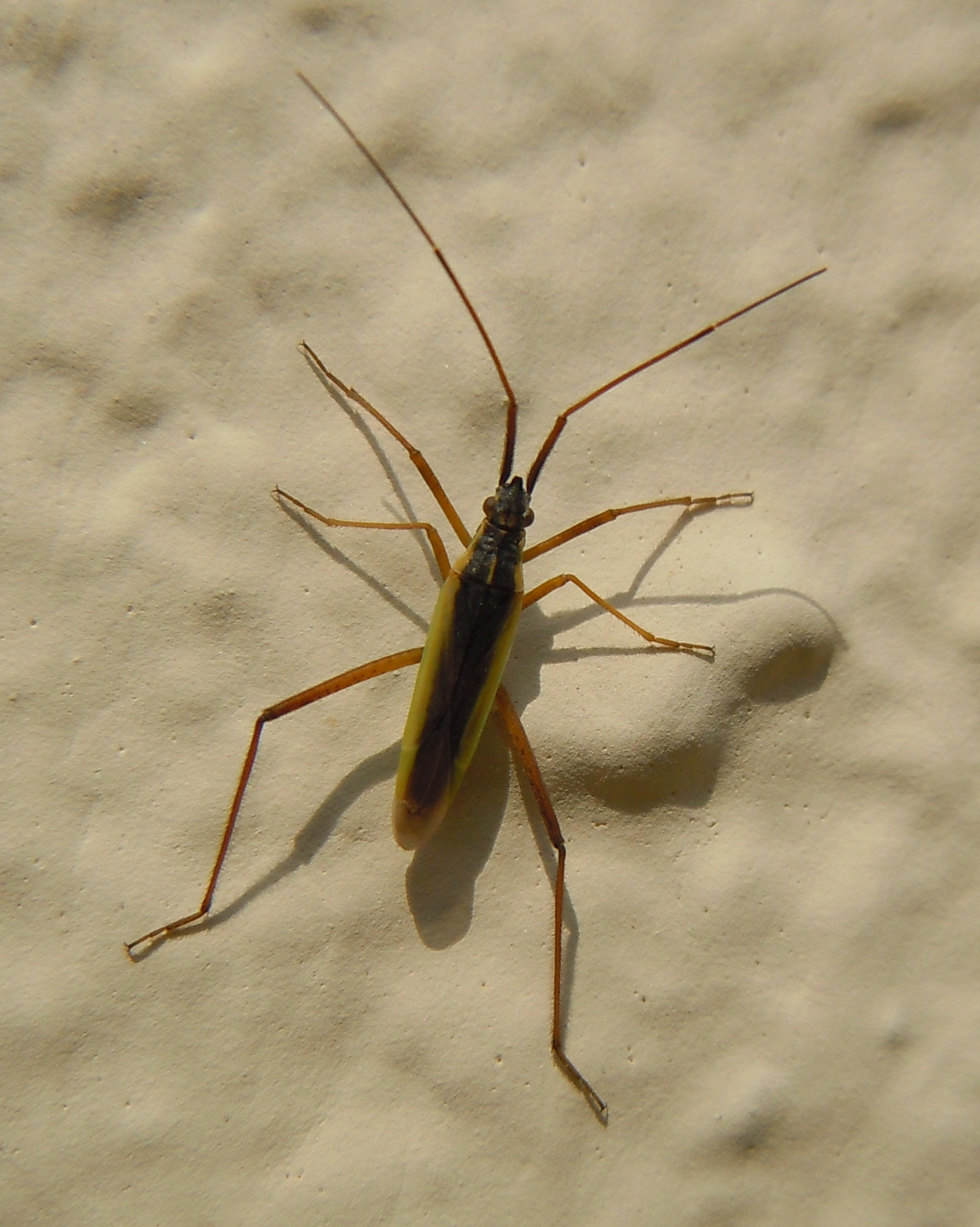
Notostira elongata

Notostira is a genus of true bugs belonging to the family Miridae.

The species of this genus are found in Europe.

Species:

- Notostira elongata (Geoffroy, 1785)
- Notostira erratica (Linnaeus, 1758)
- Notostira poppiusi Reuter, 1911
- Notostira sibirica Golub, 1978
