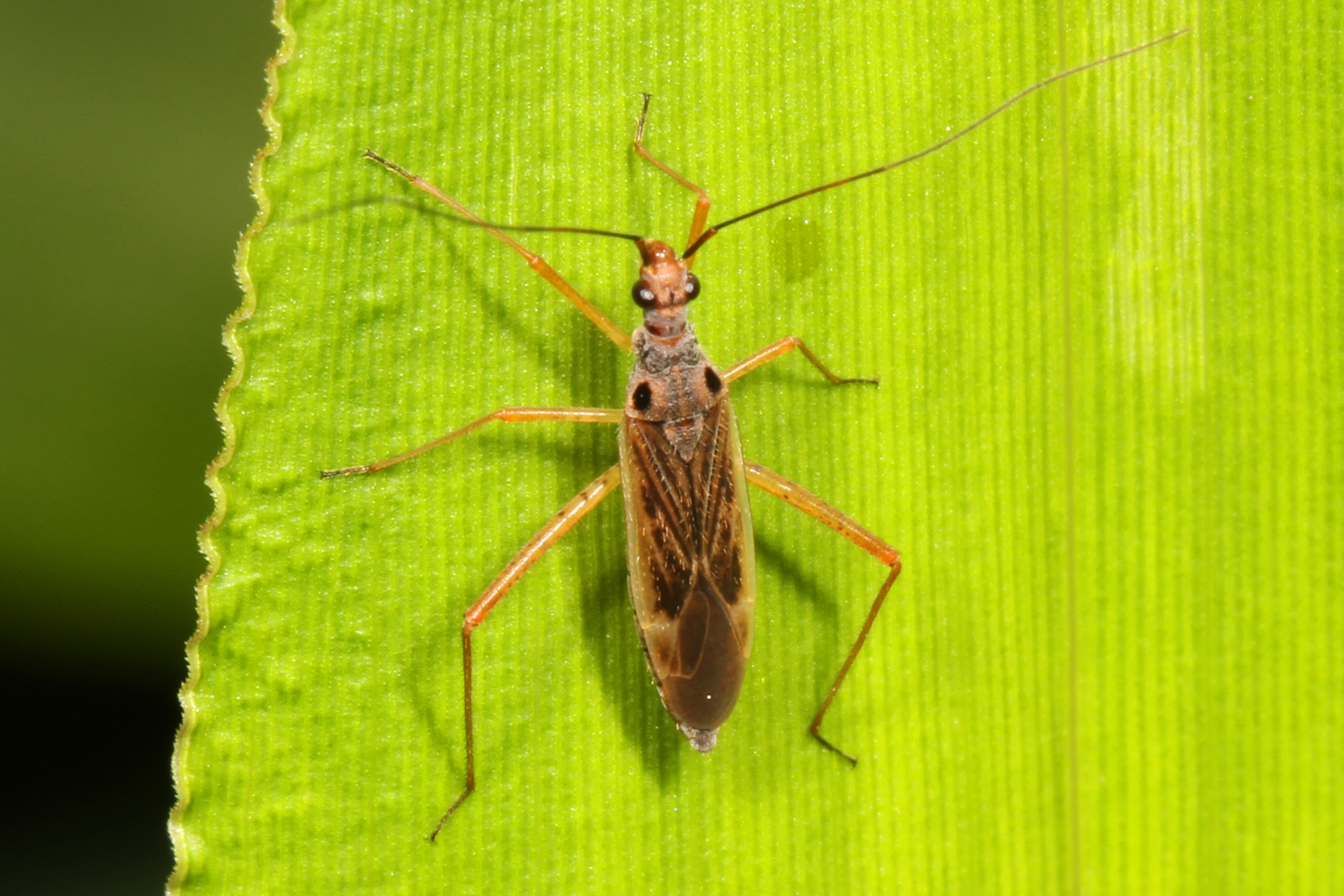
- Collaria oculata

Scientific classification
- Kingdom: Animalia
- Phylum: Arthropoda
- Class: Insecta
- Order: Hemiptera
- Suborder: Heteroptera
- Family: Miridae
- Subfamily: Mirinae
- Tribe: Stenodemini; China, 1943

= Stenodemini =

Tribe of true bugs

Stenodemini is a tribe of plant bugs in the family Miridae. There are more than 60 described species in Stenodemini.

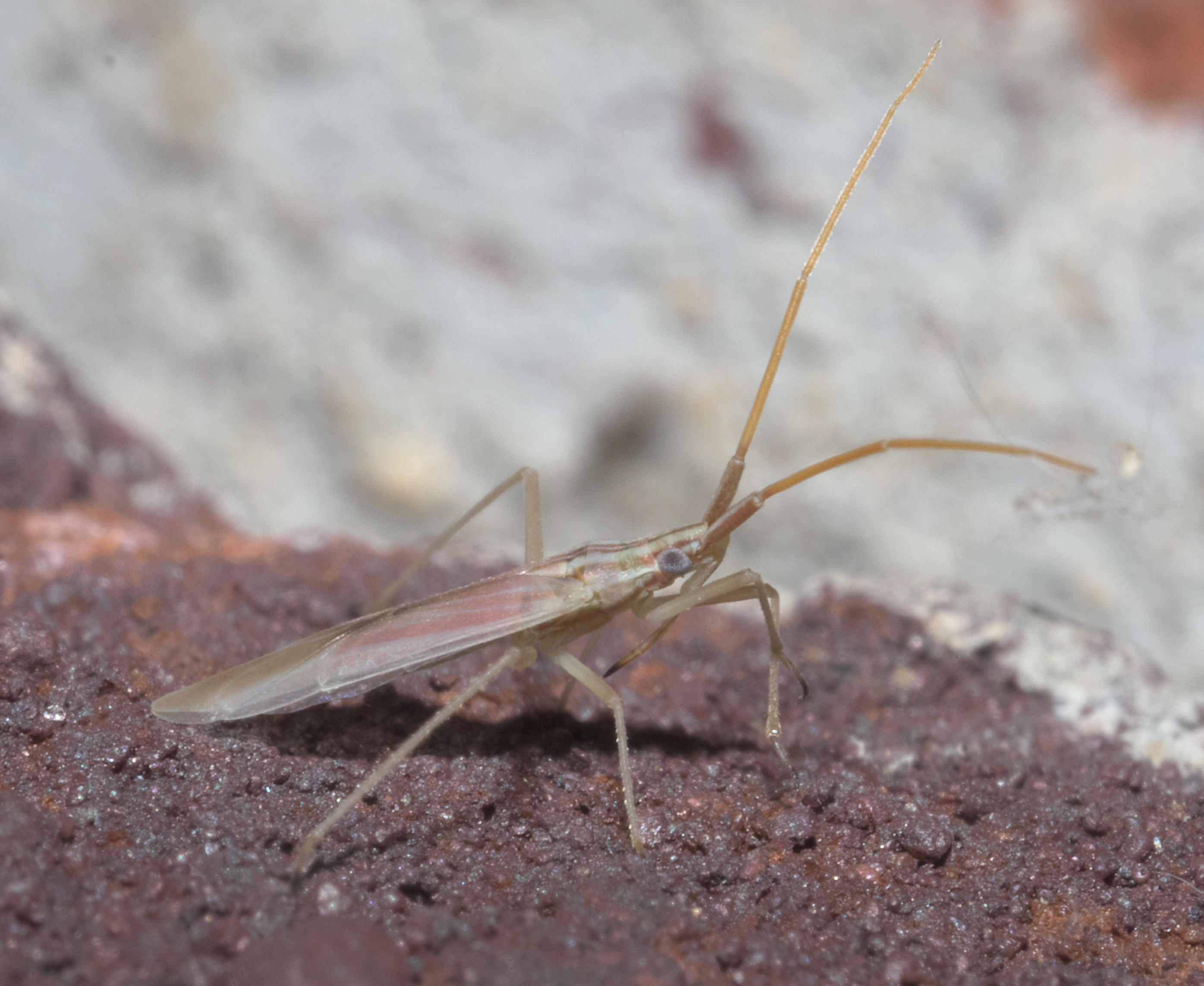
Trigonotylus pulcher

== Genera ==
BioLib includes:

1. Acetropis Fieber, 1858
2. Acomocera Eyles, 1975
3. Actinocoris Reuter, 1878
4. Asteliamiris Schwartz & Polhemus, 1999
5. Autumnimiris Schwartz, 1989
6. Caracoris Schwartz, 1989
7. Chaetedus Eyles, 1975
8. Chaetofoveolocoris Knight, 1968
9. Chaetomiris Bliven, 1973
10. Collaria (bug) Provancher, 1872
11. Cynodonmiris Carpintero & Estévez, 2001
12. Dolichomiris Reuter, 1882
13. Lasiomiris Reuter, 1891
14. Leptopterna Fieber, 1858
15. Litomiris Slater, 1956
16. Megaloceroea Fieber, 1858
17. Myrmecoris Gorski, 1852
18. Neotropicomiris Carvalho & Fontes, 1969
19. Notostira Fieber, 1878
20. Ophthalmomiris Berg, 1883
21. Opisthochasis Berg, 1883
22. Porpomiris Berg, 1883
23. Schoutedenomiris Carvalho, 1951
24. Spartinomiris Carpintero & Estévez, 2001
25. Stenodema Laporte, 1833
26. Teratocoris Fieber, 1878
27. Trigonotylus Fieber, 1858
