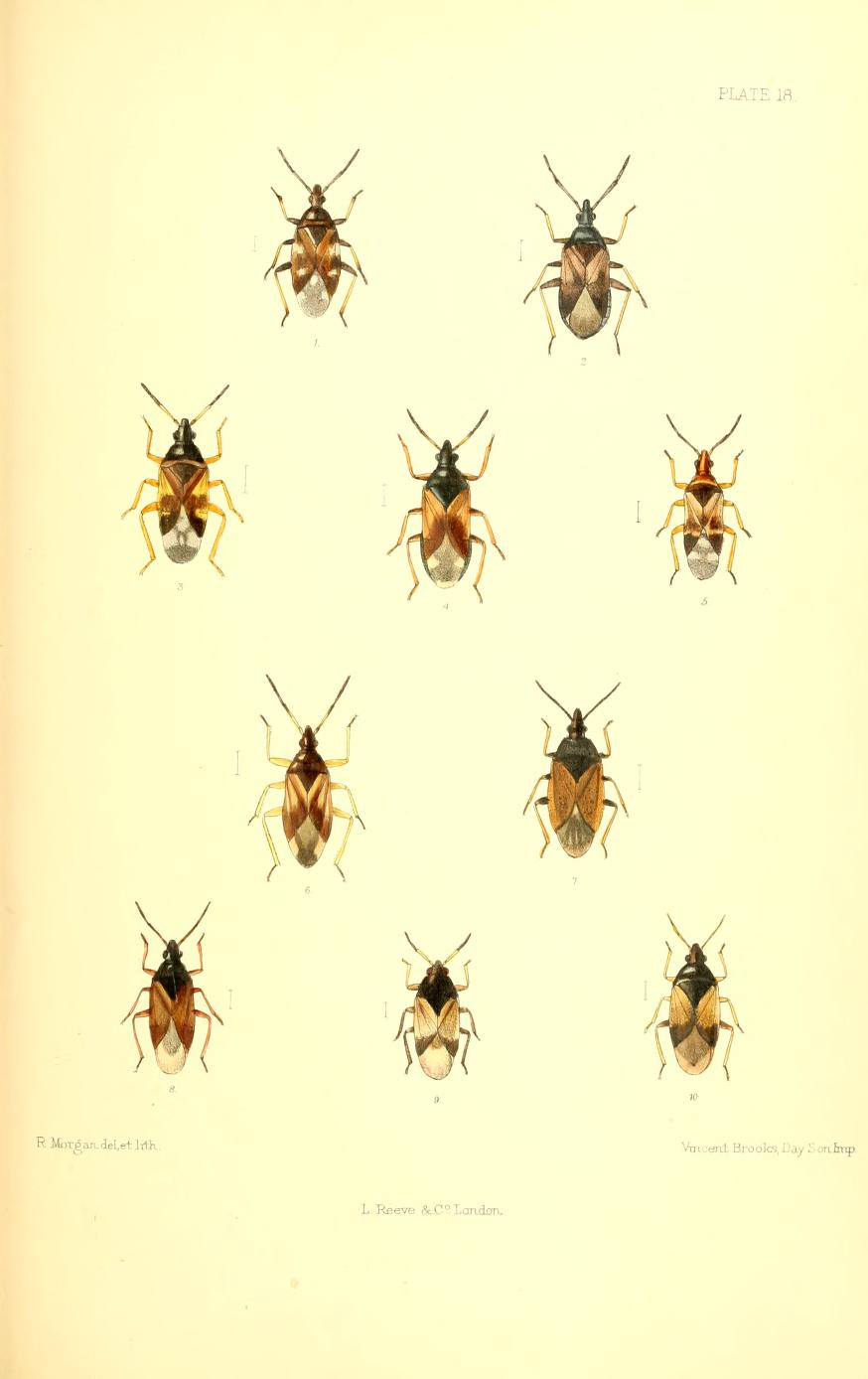
- Anthocoris nemoralis (no. 3; second row from top, far left) depicted by Saunders, 1892

Scientific classification
- Kingdom: Animalia
- Phylum: Arthropoda
- Clade: Pancrustacea
- Class: Insecta
- Order: Hemiptera
- Suborder: Heteroptera
- Family: Anthocoridae
- Genus: Anthocoris
- Species: A. nemoralis

Binomial name
- Anthocoris nemoralis (Fabricius, 1794)

= Anthocoris nemoralis =

Species of true bug

Anthocoris nemoralis is a true bug in the family Anthocoridae. The species is native to Europe and is introduced in North America. It is a predator of aphids, spider mites and jumping plant lice, and is therefore used as a biological pest control agent.

== Description ==
The adult of this species is about 3 mm (0.12 in) long and is mostly black, with white markings on its wings. The nymphs grow to about 6 mm (0.24 in) long, the smaller nymphs being yellowish to orange, and the larger ones having a yellowish to orange head and thorax and a darker coloured abdomen.

== Distribution ==
Anthocoris nemoralis has a West Palearctic distribution and is found from the British Isles across Western Europe East to the Caucasus and South to the Mediterranean basin. It is absent from Fennoscandia. It was introduced into Eastern Canada accidentally, and then in 1963 was introduced purposefully into British Columbia in an attempt to control pear psylla. Later it spread southwards to California where it feeds on various exotic psylla pests of ornamental plants.

== Ecology ==
Both the nymphs and the adults of A. nemoralis are predaceous, feeding by plunging their proboscises into their insect prey and sucking out the body fluids. Adults overwinter under bark, among leaf litter or in other sheltered locations. They emerge in spring to lay their eggs in plant tissues of their host tree. In leaves, the eggs are inserted under the epidermis so that there is a bulge in the leaf surface, and only the whitish operculum at one end of the egg is visible. These soon hatch into nymphs which feed voraciously. The whole developmental cycle takes about 15 days and there may be up to four generations in a year.

These bugs are able to utilise a range of different trees, with a wide range of prey being targeted; the prey include aphids, spider mites, thrips, juvenile scale insects, pear psylla and the eggs of a variety of insects. The French entomologist Franck Hérard in 1986 listed it as eating twelve species of insect and five species of mite. In Europe it is considered to be one of the most important control agents of Cacopsylla pyricola and Psylla pyri and has a density-dependent relationship with the former.
