= Spanioneura fonscolombii =

Scientific classification
- Domain: Eukaryota
- Kingdom: Animalia
- Phylum: Arthropoda
- Class: Insecta
- Order: Hemiptera
- Suborder: Sternorrhyncha
- Family: Psyllidae
- Subfamily: Psyllinae
- Genus: Spanioneura
- Species: S. fonscolombii

Binomial name
- Spanioneura fonscolombii Förster, 1848

Species of true bug

Spanioneura fonscolombii, is a species of plant-parasitic psyllid in the family Psyllidae which feed on box (Buxus sempervirens). It was first described by Arnold Förster in 1848 and is found in Europe. It is also found in the United States of America where it was accidentally introduced.

== Description ==
A distinctive green psyllid which specialises on box (Buxus sempervirens). It has elongated pointed forewings with yellowish cells with dark spots at the apices of four cells and the veins of the wings are yellow and/or green. The antennae are orange with a dark tip.

Galls

There is some dispute as to whether the bug causes galls on the leaves of its food plant. Plant Parasites of Europe claims that adults and larvae live freely on the leaves without causing any galling, while in the literature of the British Plant Gall Society there are small, pale, cabbage-like clusters at the tips of the shoots of box. The affected leaves are thicker than normal leaves, are strongly concave and shelter numerous pale-green nymphs, which are coated in a white wax. The nymphs mature and leave the plant in late summer and lay eggs, which overwinter on the shoots and leaves. Alternatively the imago (adult) overwinters on the host plant.

=== Similar species ===
Another psyllid, the Boxwood psyllid (Psylla buxi), is also associated with box but can be distinguished from S. fonscolombii by the tip of the abdomen, which is orange and lacks dark spots and yellowing on the wing cells.

== Distribution ==
Spanioneura fonscolombii is found in Belgium, France, Great Britain, Italy, Luxembourg, Romania, Spain and Switzerland. It has been accidentally introduced to the United States of America.
