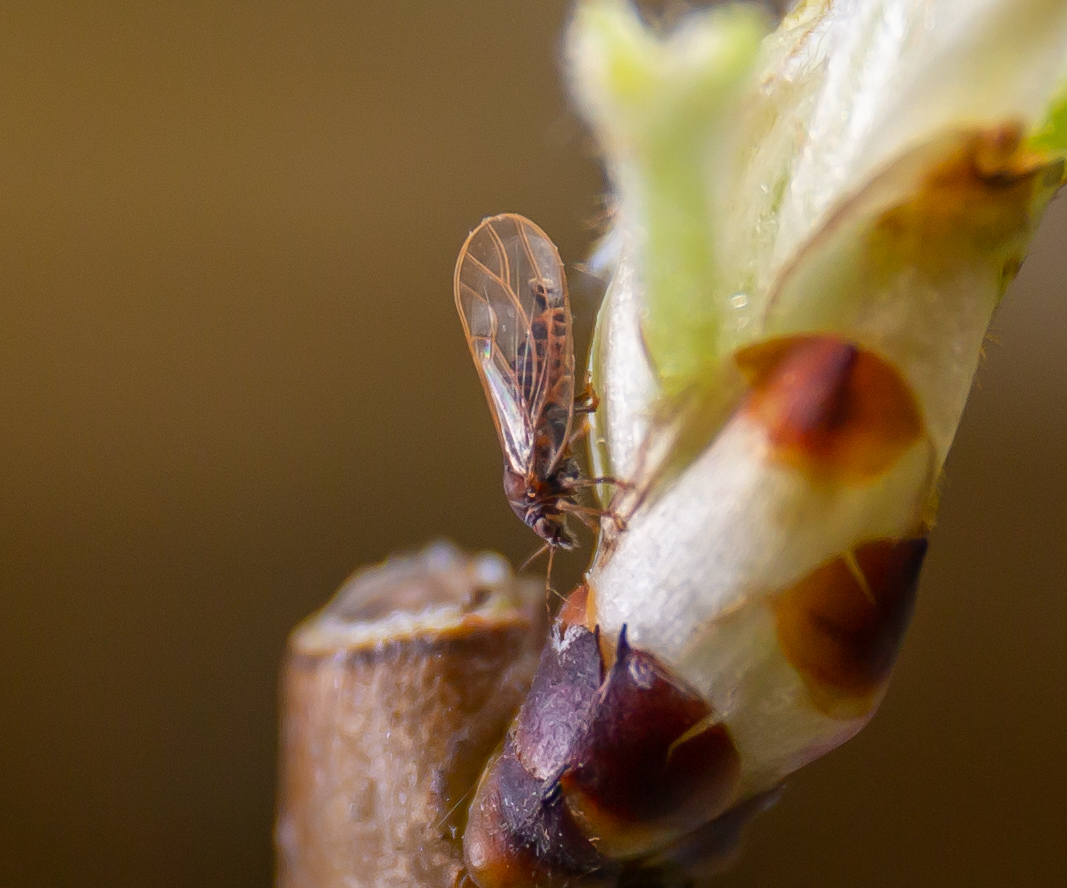
- male

Scientific classification
- Kingdom: Animalia
- Phylum: Arthropoda
- Class: Insecta
- Order: Hemiptera
- Suborder: Sternorrhyncha
- Family: Psyllidae
- Genus: Cacopsylla
- Species: C. pyrisuga

Binomial name
- Cacopsylla pyrisuga (Foerster, 1848)

Synonyms
- Psylla pyrisuga

= Cacopsylla pyrisuga =

Species of jumping plant lice

Cacopsylla pyrisuga, or the large pear sucker, is a species of true bug in the family Psyllidae known as a pest of pear trees (Pyrus) in Central and North Europe.

== Description ==
A relatively large pear psyllid, adults reach 3.5–4 mm length. Young adults in spring and early summer are green with yellowish head and thorax, whereas they darken to a rusty red hue towards the autumn.

In general, psyllid taxonomy is often complicated due to morphological similarities; C. pyrisuga forms the group "pyrisuga" with the closely related species C. burckhardti and C. accincta, within which it is nearly impossible to distinguish individual species. The latter two species are only found in East Asia, however, and European specimens belong exclusively to C. pyrisuga.

Eggs are not stalked, while nymphs resemble those of Cacopsylla pyricola. The nymphs are green with varying amount of black markings.

== Ecology and distribution ==
The species is an important pest of pear trees, its main host. Adults overwinter on conifers in the wild, and migrate to pear plantations at the beginning of spring. There, they reproduce and then die. The new generation develops on young shoots until emerging as adults in May/June, after which they migrate to overwintering sites where they stay dormant until the next spring. Paradoxically, they are thus absent from their main host most of the year.

As other psyllids, they mainly cause damage indirectly by exuding sticky liquid which stains the fruits and promotes growth of mold. Only large outbreaks can cause defoliation, reduce fruit growth and cause early fruit loss. Additionally, they can act as vectors of microbial plant pathogens, such as phytoplasms. C. pyrisuga has been confirmed as a vector of "Candidatus Phytoplasma pyri" which causes pear decline, a devastating disease of pear trees.

The species has a West Palearctic distribution, i. e. Europe and West Asia, limited by the distribution of its main host. Its area extends northwards to Scandinavia, but only one record is known for the British Isles.

== Sexual behavior ==
Male vibrational signal
Vibrational signal of a male, recorded with a laser vibrometer

C. pyrisuga male emitting a vibrational signal; 200× slowed.

Like other psyllids, C. pyrisuga adults use a combination of pheromones and vibrational signals to recognize and locate mates on the host plant. Cuticular hydrocarbons, predominantly long-chain alkanes act as pheromones in pear psyllids. Likewise, vibrational duet resembles that of other known pear psyllid species. The female spontaneously emits calling signals composed of several short pulses, which stimulates the male to reply with own signal comprising a series of short pulses and a longer "buzz".

Recordings of this species have revealed that psyllids do not produce vibrational signals with stridulation (rubbing of body parts together) as was commonly thought. Instead, wing flapping ("buzzing") approximately 150 times per second is involved. This buzzing is not transmitted as sound but through the legs to the branch the animal is standing on.
