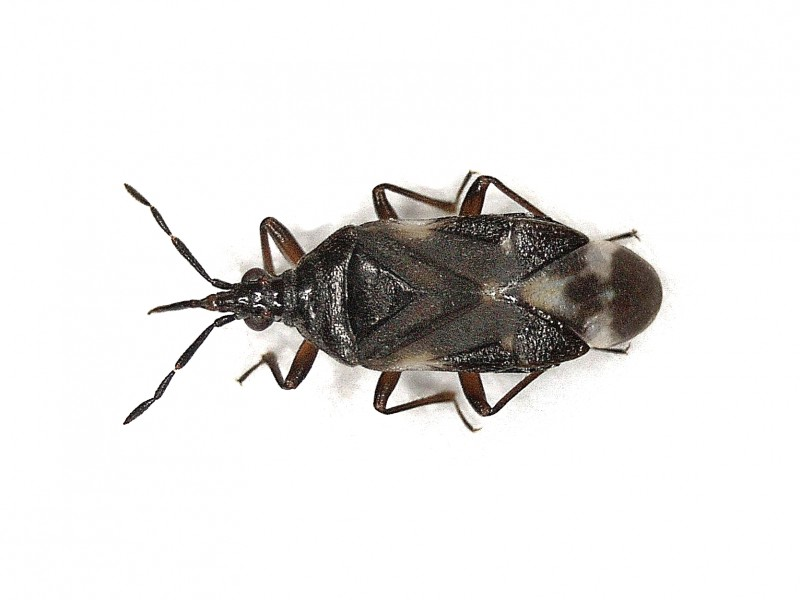

Scientific classification
- Kingdom: Animalia
- Phylum: Arthropoda
- Class: Insecta
- Order: Hemiptera
- Suborder: Heteroptera
- Family: Anthocoridae
- Genus: Anthocoris
- Species: A. confusus

Binomial name
- Anthocoris confusus Reuter, 1884

= Anthocoris confusus =

Species of true bug

Anthocoris confusus is a species of minute pirate bug in the family Anthocoridae. It is found in Europe and Northern Asia (including China and Japan) and North America.

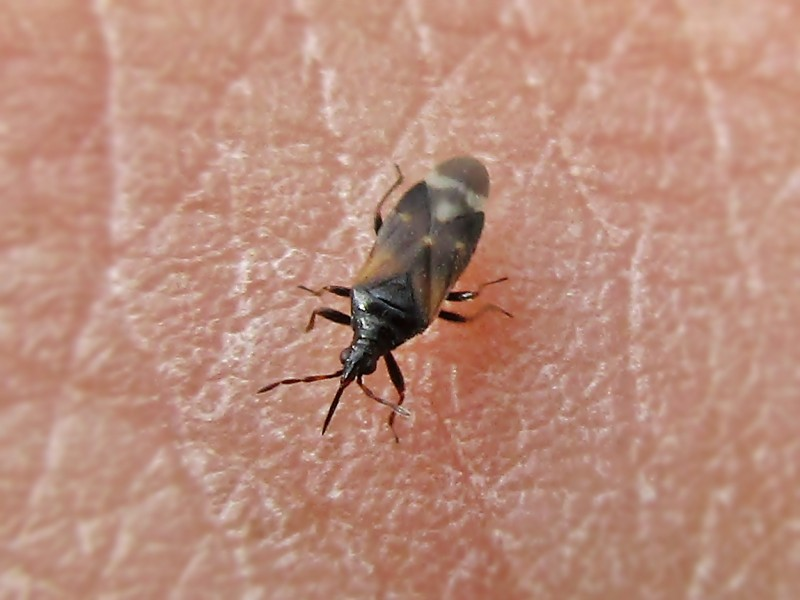

It lives on various deciduous trees and feeds on aphids, such as the subfamily Thelaxinae and Psylloidea and Psocoptera.It is found on willow (Salix ), beech ( Fagus ), maples (Acer), linden trees (Tilia), oak trees (Quercus), white thorns (Crataegus), elms (Ulmus), poplars (Populus) and ash (Fraxinus) among other trees.
