= Floria =

Floria may refer to:

- Floria, a village in Crete, Greece
- MS Floria, a former Finnish ferry
- Floria Capsali (1900–1982), an Ottoman-born Romanian ballerina and choreographer
- Flora (coral) Turnsek & Mihajlovic, 1981, an extinct, valid genus of hexacoral in the Order Scleractinia (family Actinastreidae)
- Floria Löw, 1879, a synonym of the psyllid genus Livilla Curtis, 1836
