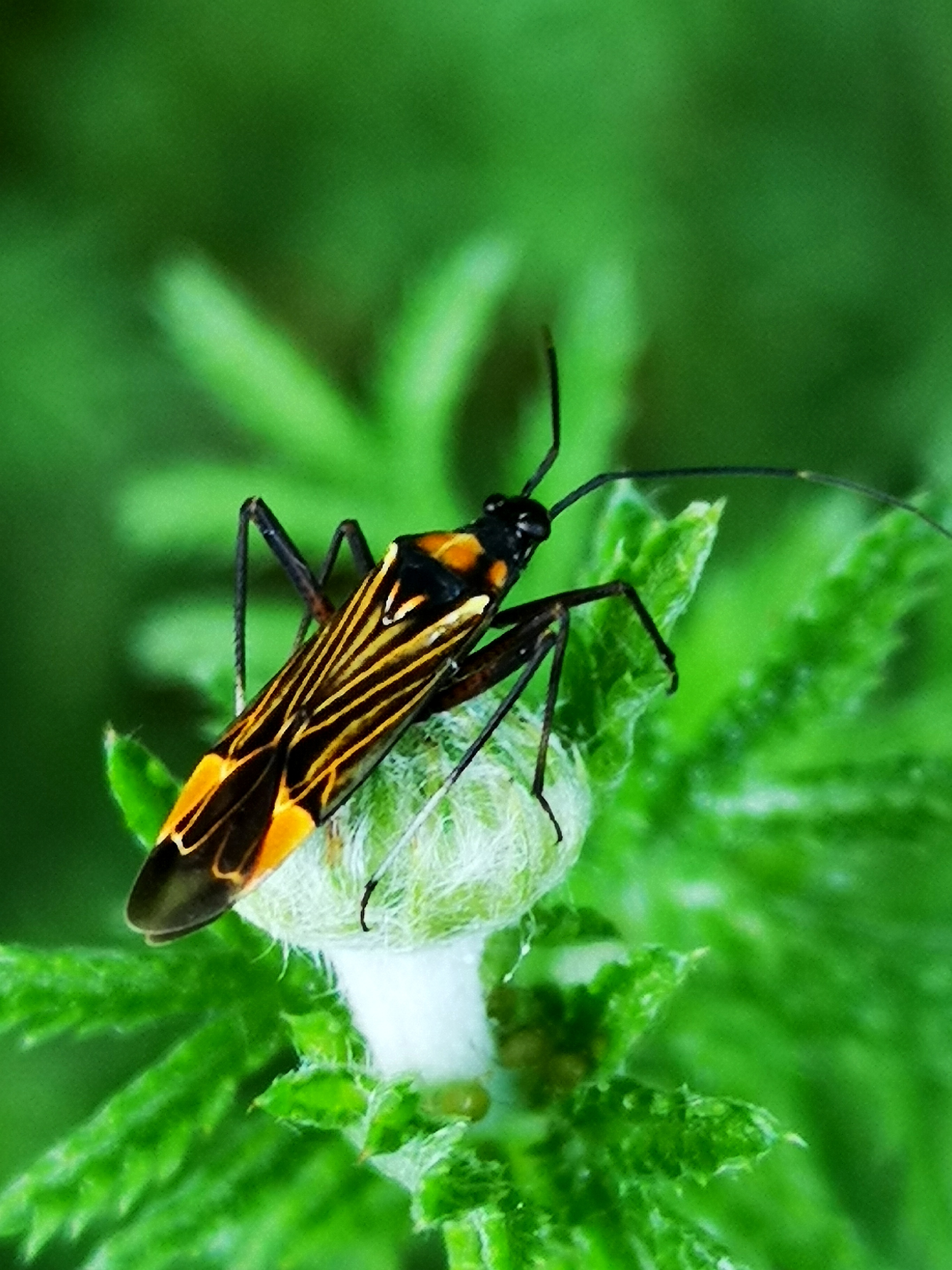

Scientific classification
- Kingdom: Animalia
- Phylum: Arthropoda
- Class: Insecta
- Order: Hemiptera
- Suborder: Heteroptera
- Family: Miridae
- Genus: Miris
- Species: M. striatus

Binomial name
- Miris striatus (Linnaeus, 1758)

= Miris striatus =

Streaked Plant Bug

Species of true bug

Miris striatus, commonly known as the streaked plant bug, is a Palearctic species of true bug that is the type species of the type genus of the family Miridae. It has been reported to be a predator of psyllids such as Cacopsylla melanoneura.
