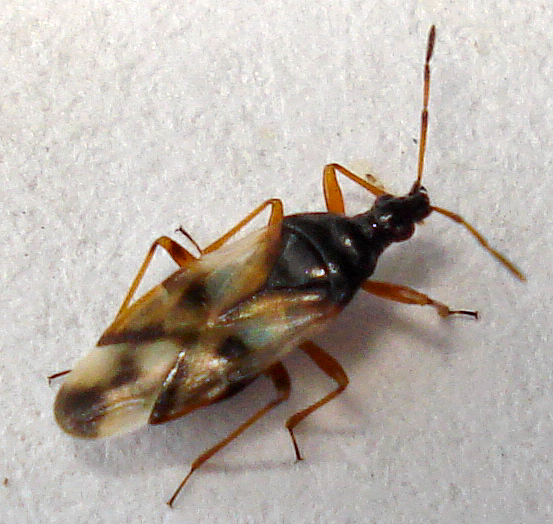
- Anthocoris nemorum

Scientific classification
- Kingdom: Animalia
- Phylum: Arthropoda
- Clade: Pancrustacea
- Class: Insecta
- Order: Hemiptera
- Suborder: Heteroptera
- Family: Anthocoridae
- Tribe: Anthocorini
- Genus: Anthocoris; Fallen, 1814

Species
- See text

= Anthocoris =

Genus of true bugs

Anthocoris is a genus of minute pirate bugs in the family Anthocoridae. There are at least 30 described species in Anthocoris.

== Species ==
These 32 species belong to the genus Anthocoris:

- Anthocoris albiger Reuter, 1884^{i c g}
- Anthocoris alienus (White, 1880)^{g}
- Anthocoris amplicollis Horváth, 1893^{g}
- Anthocoris antevolens White, 1879^{i c g b}
- Anthocoris bakeri Poppius, 1913^{i c g b}
- Anthocoris bicuspis (Herrich-Schaeffer, 1835)^{i c g}
- Anthocoris butleri Le Quesne, 1954^{g}
- Anthocoris caucasicus Kolenati, 1857^{g}
- Anthocoris confusus Reuter, 1884^{i c g b}
- Anthocoris dimorphicus Anderson & Kelton, 1963^{i c g b}
- Anthocoris fulvipennis Reuter, 1884^{i c g}
- Anthocoris gallarumulmi (De Geer, 1773)^{g}
- Anthocoris guentheri Pericart, 2007^{g}
- Anthocoris limbatus Fieber, 1836^{g}
- Anthocoris minki Dohrn, 1860^{g}
- Anthocoris musculus (Say, 1832)^{i c g b}
- Anthocoris nemoralis (Fabricius, 1794)^{i c g b} (flower bug)
- Anthocoris nemorum (Linnaeus, 1761)^{i c g}
- Anthocoris nigricornis Zetterstedt, 1838^{g}
- Anthocoris nigripes Reuter, 1884^{i c g}
- Anthocoris pilosus (Jakovlev, 1877)^{g}
- Anthocoris pini Barensprung, 1858^{g}
- Anthocoris poissoni Kiritshenko, 1952^{g}
- Anthocoris salicis Lindberg, 1953^{g}
- Anthocoris sarothamni Douglas & Scott, 1865^{g}
- Anthocoris simillimus Poppius, 1909^{g}
- Anthocoris simulans Reuter, 1884^{g}
- Anthocoris stigmatellus Zetterstedt, 1838^{g}
- Anthocoris tomentosus Péricart, 1971^{i c g b}
- Anthocoris tristis Van Duzee, 1921^{i c g}
- Anthocoris visci Douglas, 1889^{g}
- Anthocoris whitei Reuter, 1884^{i c g b}

Data sources: i = ITIS, c = Catalogue of Life, g = GBIF, b = Bugguide.net
