= Spanioneura =

Scientific classification
- Domain: Eukaryota
- Kingdom: Animalia
- Phylum: Arthropoda
- Class: Insecta
- Order: Hemiptera
- Suborder: Sternorrhyncha
- Family: Psyllidae
- Subfamily: Psyllinae
- Genus: Spanioneura; Förster, 1848

Type species
- Spanioneura fonscolombii Foerster, 1848

Genus of true bugs

Spanioneura is a genus of sap-sucking insects belonging to the order Hemiptera. The genus was erected by Arnold Förster in 1848 and described species are mostly recorded from Europe, with the type species Spanioneura fonscolombii also found in the United States of America, where it was accidentally introduced.

== Species ==
the Encyclopedia of Life includes:

1. Spanioneura caucasica Loginova 1968
2. Spanioneura fonscolombii Foerster, 1848
3. Spanioneura pechai (Klimaszewski & Lodos 1977)
4. Spanioneura persica Burckhardt & Lauterer 1993
5. Spanioneura turkiana (Klimaszewski & Lodos 1977)
