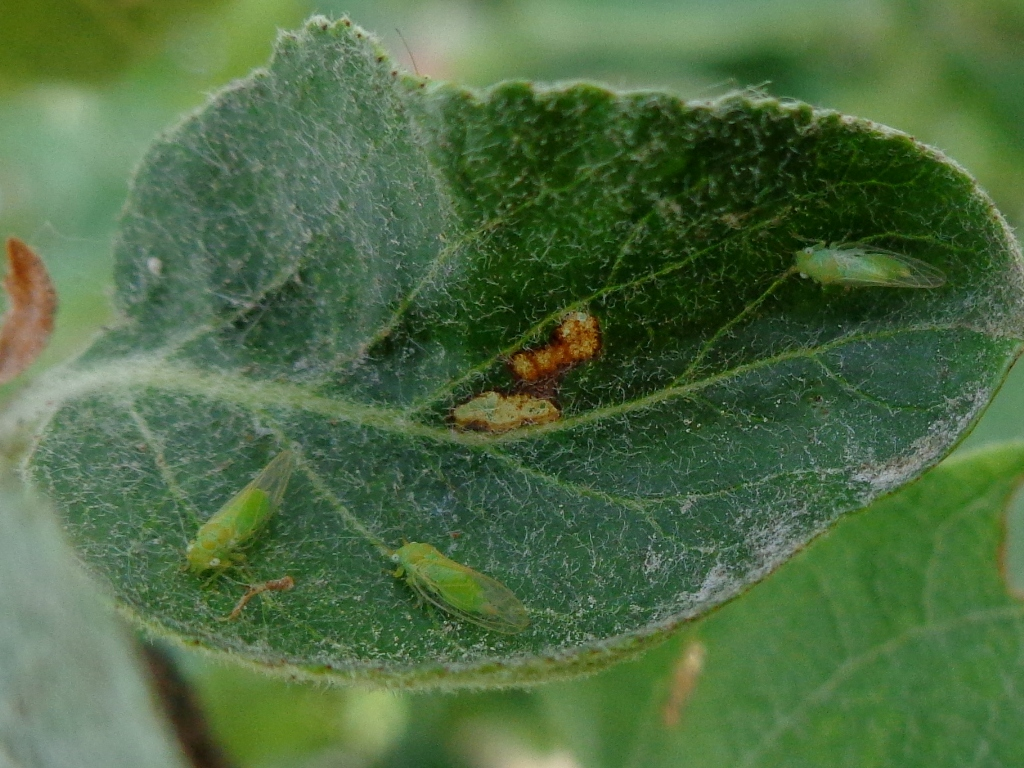

Scientific classification
- Kingdom: Animalia
- Phylum: Arthropoda
- Clade: Pancrustacea
- Class: Insecta
- Order: Hemiptera
- Suborder: Sternorrhyncha
- Family: Psyllidae
- Genus: Cacopsylla
- Species: C. mali

Binomial name
- Cacopsylla mali (Schmidberger, 1836)

Synonyms
- Psylla mali (Schmidberger, 1836)

= Cacopsylla mali =

Species of true bug

Cacopsylla mali, the apple leaf sucker or apple psylla is a species of plant lice; these insects belong to the subfamily Psyllinae and are native to Eurasia and have been introduced to northern America.
