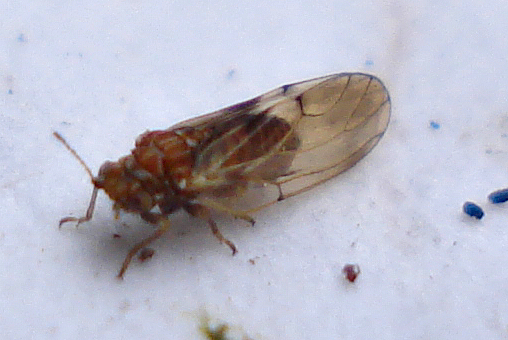

Scientific classification
- Kingdom: Animalia
- Phylum: Arthropoda
- Class: Insecta
- Order: Hemiptera
- Suborder: Sternorrhyncha
- Family: Psyllidae
- Genus: Cacopsylla
- Species: C. pyri

Binomial name
- Cacopsylla pyri (Linné, 1758)

Synonyms
- Cacopsylla (Hepatopsylla) pyri (Linné, 1761); Psylla pyrarboris Šulc, 1909; Chermes pyri Linné, 1758; Psylla pyri (Linné, 1758); Psylla pyri L., 1758; Psylla pyri Linn.

= Cacopsylla pyri =

Species of true bug

Cacopsylla pyri, commonly known as the pear psylla, pear psyllid, or by its synonym Psylla pyri, is an insect in the subfamily Psyllinae. Originating in Europe and Asia, it has spread to North America. It is a pest of pear trees, sucking the sap, damaging the foliage, flowers and fruit and diminishing the crop.

== Description ==
Adult C. pyri are between 2 and 3 mm (0.08 and 0.12 in) long. The colour is variable, ranging between orange-red and black, the thorax having whitish longitudinal stripes on its upper surface. The wings are transparent, with dark veins and sometimes a smoky appearance near the base. Later instar nymphs are purplish-brown or reddish-brown, with white longitudinal stripes and black patches; the developing wing-pads each bear a single knobbed bristle. The younger nymphs are yellowish with red-purple eyes.

== Distribution ==
The species is found in Europe, including Scandinavia, and in Asia. In Britain it used to be very rare, with only one record before 1969, but since then it has become much more common, especially in the southeast of the country. It was introduced accidentally into North America, being observed in Connecticut in 1832 and arriving in Washington State by 1939, soon becoming a serious pest of pears in the Pacific Northwest.

== Life cycle ==
This psyllid overwinters as an adult, concealing itself in a crack in the bark. In spring it leaves diapause, and the female starts laying eggs round the base of the swelling buds. Later in the summer, the eggs are laid beside the midribs of the leaves, on the petioles and on the flower buds. The nymphs moult five times, and both nymphs and adults insert their mouthparts deep into the phloem tissue to suck the sap, secreting the excess fluid as honeydew.

== Ecology ==
Research in an untreated orchard in Turkey found 32 predator and three parasitoid species of insect associated with this psylla. The predators included the predatory bugs Anthocoris nemoralis and Deraeocoris spp., the green lacewing Chrysoperla carnea and several ladybirds. The wasp Trechnites psyllae (Encyrtinae) was the main parasitoid. In a research study in the United States, a single developing nymph of the predatory bug Deraeocoris brevis took 25 days to mature during which time it consumed about 400 eggs and nymphs of the pear psylla.

Another predator, the running crab spider Philodromus cespitum, preys on this species in European fruit orchards.

== Damage ==
Cacopsylla pyri damages pear trees by sucking the plant sap; leaves are yellowed and distorted and flower buds and fruitlets are shed. The excess honeydew produced by the insects coats the leaves, covering up the stomata, and encourages the growth of sooty mould. The size of fruit is decreased and tree growth is diminished. Honeydew can cause discolouration of fruit, leading to its being downgraded. Heavy infestations can result in "psylla shock", caused by toxins in the saliva and resulting in defoliation or fruit drop, which may also affect the following year's crop.

The psyllia can also carry mycoplasma in their saliva which can cause disease of the conducting cells in the tree's phloem. Failure of nutrients to be translocated downwards can cause root starvation, with trees either declining slowly or suffering from sudden collapse. Trees grafted onto Pyrus pyrifolia or Pyrus ussuriensis rootstocks are more susceptible to this disease than those on Pyrus communis.
