= Arytaina =

Scientific classification
- Kingdom: Animalia
- Phylum: Arthropoda
- Class: Insecta
- Order: Hemiptera
- Suborder: Sternorrhyncha
- Family: Psyllidae
- Subfamily: Psyllinae
- Genus: Arytaina; Foerster, 1848

Synonyms
- Amblyrhina, Ataenia; Arytaena Scott, 1876; Psyllopa

Genus of true bugs

External image
- Images at iNaturalist

Arytaina is a genus of mostly Palaearctic plant lice belonging to the subfamily Psyllinae (it was previously placed in a subfamily Arytaininae); this genus was erected by Arnold Förster in 1848. The distribution of species is mostly in southern Europe and Asia, with records from southern Africa and western USA. Distribution records include Europe and North Africa, with possible introductions to New Zealand, Australia and the USA. Arytaina genistae is one of the two British "broom psyllids": the other is in the related genus Arytainilla.

== Species ==
The Global Biodiversity Information Facility includes:

1. Arytaina adenocarpi Löw, 1880
2. Arytaina africana Heslop-Harrison, 1951
3. Arytaina devia Loginova, 1976
4. Arytaina genistae (Latreille, 1804)
5. Arytaina helleri Burckhardt, 1989
6. Arytaina hispanica Hodkinson & Hollis, 1987
7. Arytaina longicella Hodkinson & Hollis, 1987
8. Arytaina maculata (Löw, 1886)
9. Arytaina magnidentata Hodkinson & Hollis, 1987
10. Arytaina meridionalis Bastin, Burckhardt & Ouvrard, 2023
11. Arytaina nubivaga Loginova, 1976
12. Arytaina punctinervis Crawford, 1919
13. Arytaina putonii (Loew, 1888)
14. Arytaina torifrons (Flor, 1861)
15. Arytaina virgina Caldwell, 1944
16. Arytaina vittata Percy, 2003
17. Arytaina yangi Fang, 1990
