= Josef Schmidberger =

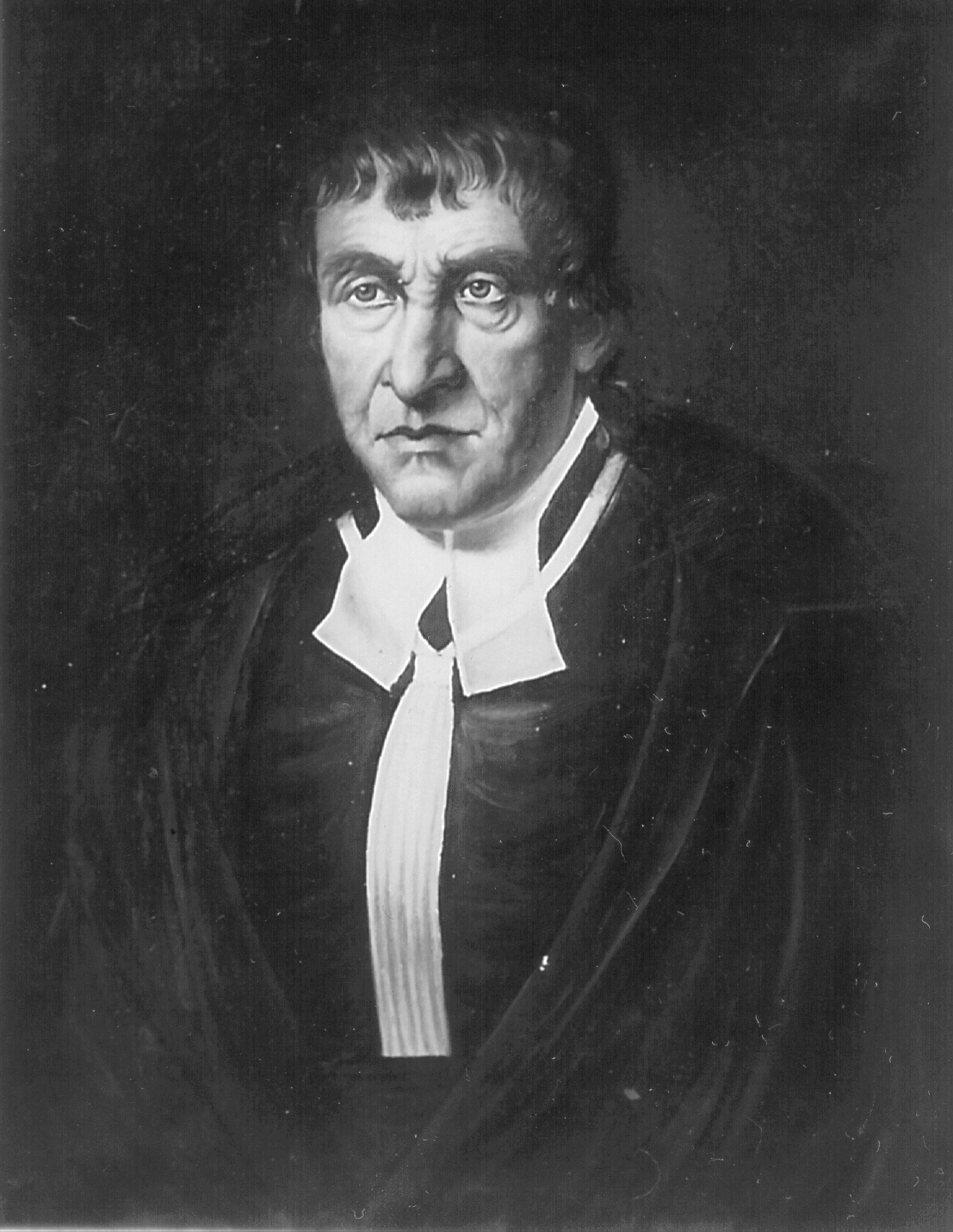

Josef Schmidberger (November 4, 1773 – August 10, 1844) was an Augustinian priest and pomologist in Austria. He cultivated fruit trees particularly at the convent of St. Florian where he was a Canon Regular. He studied the insects that affected the fruit trees and pioneered biological control measures through the use of parasitic insects.

== Life and work ==
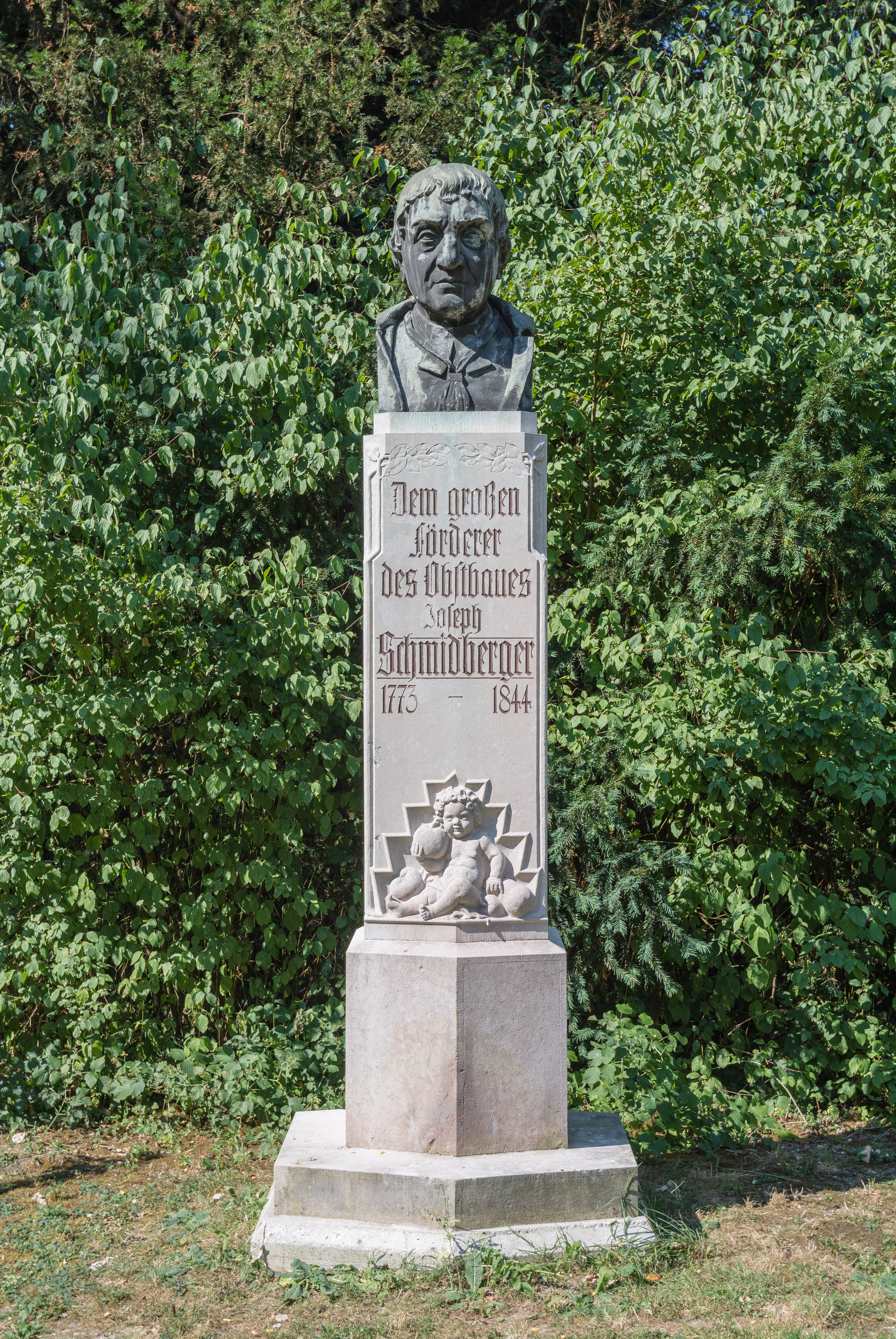
Memorial to Schmidberger at St. Florian

Schmidberger was born in Urfahr (Linz, Upper Austria), the son of a weaver. He studied philosophy at Linz, and medicine at the University of Vienna (1894-95) and became interested in the natural sciences after attending the classes of Nikolaus Joseph von Jacquin and Joseph Franz von Jacquin. He discontinued studies due to poor health and joined the Augustinian Canonry at St. Florian in 1796. He took his oath in 1798 and was ordained priest in 1800. He worked at Ansfelden and moved back to St. Florian in 1810. He was placed in charge of hunting affairs from 1812 and gardening duties from 1817. He began to experiment with plant breeding and grew fruit trees. He studied the insects of the fruit trees that he grew. He described the psyllid Psylla mali in 1836. He examined the potential of using parasitic insects to control pest insects. He believed that undisturbed nature showed a wise harmony. He contributed to the section on insects in Vincenz Kollar's work on fruit trees. He also established an insect collection as part of the Musealvereins Francisco-Carolinum in Linz where he served as a founding board member.

Schmidberger died at St. Florian where a memorial was built to him. A variety of apple was also named after him.
