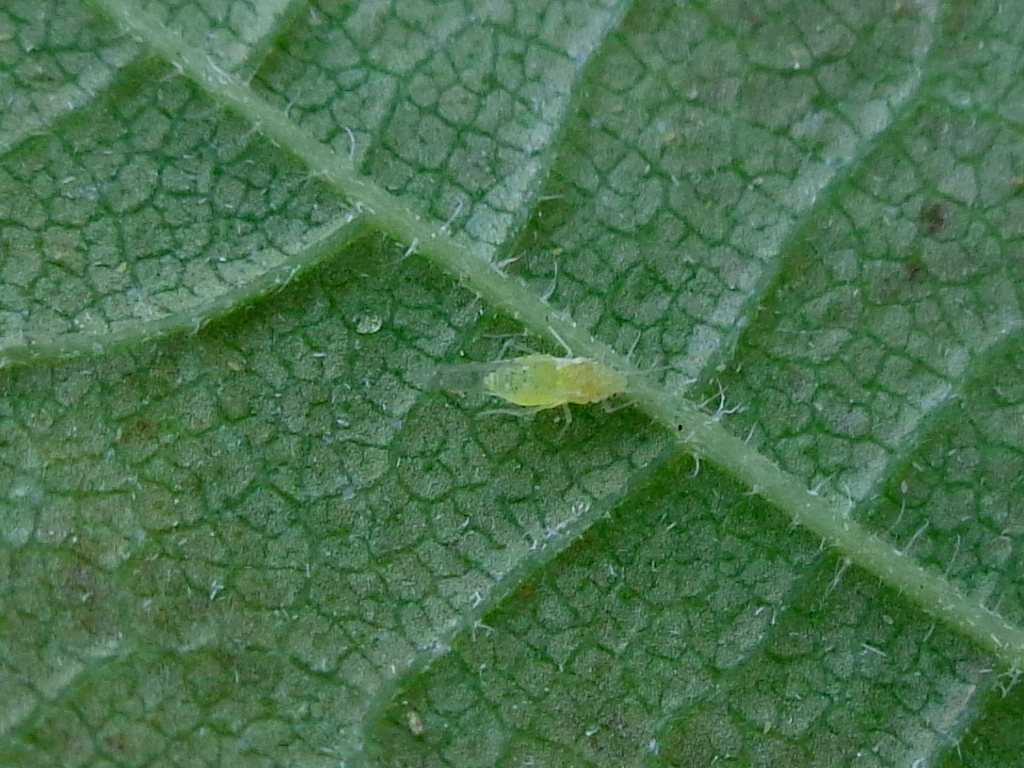

Scientific classification
- Kingdom: Animalia
- Phylum: Arthropoda
- Clade: Pancrustacea
- Class: Insecta
- Order: Hemiptera
- Suborder: Sternorrhyncha
- Family: Psyllidae
- Genus: Cacopsylla
- Species: C. ulmi

Binomial name
- Cacopsylla ulmi Förster, 1848

= Cacopsylla ulmi =

Species of insect

Cacopsylla ulmi is an insect of the Psyllidae family. It mainly feeds on Elm. Cacopsylla ulmi is a widespread species in Europe, including Britain and the Balkans. Adults are 3.6–4.3 mm long. The head is 1–1.01 mm wide, with a vertex which is 0.5 mm wide and 0.24–0.28 mm long. The genal cones are laterally somewhat concave, and 0.25 mm long . Antennae are 1.89–2.0 mm. Forewings are 3.5 mm long and 1.4 mm wide.
