= Cacopsylla elegans =

Scientific classification
- Domain: Eukaryota
- Kingdom: Animalia
- Phylum: Arthropoda
- Class: Insecta
- Order: Hemiptera
- Suborder: Sternorrhyncha
- Family: Psyllidae
- Genus: Cacopsylla
- Species: C. elegans

Binomial name
- Cacopsylla elegans Inoue, 2004

Species of true bug

Cacopsylla elegans is a species of bugs in the Psyllidae family, the jumping plant lice. It is found on Sorbus japonica in Japan.
