= Thelaxes =

Scientific classification
- Domain: Eukaryota
- Kingdom: Animalia
- Phylum: Arthropoda
- Class: Insecta
- Order: Hemiptera
- Suborder: Sternorrhyncha
- Family: Aphididae
- Subfamily: Thelaxinae
- Genus: Thelaxes; Westwood, 1840

Genus of true bugs

Thelaxes is a genus of true bugs belonging to the family Aphididae.

The species of this genus are found in Europe.

Species:

- Thelaxes californica (Davidson, 1919)
- Thelaxes dryophila (Schrank, 1801)
- Thelaxes elegantula (Dahlbom, 1851)
- Thelaxes suberi (Del Guercio, 1911)
- Thelaxes valtadorosi Remaudière, 1983
