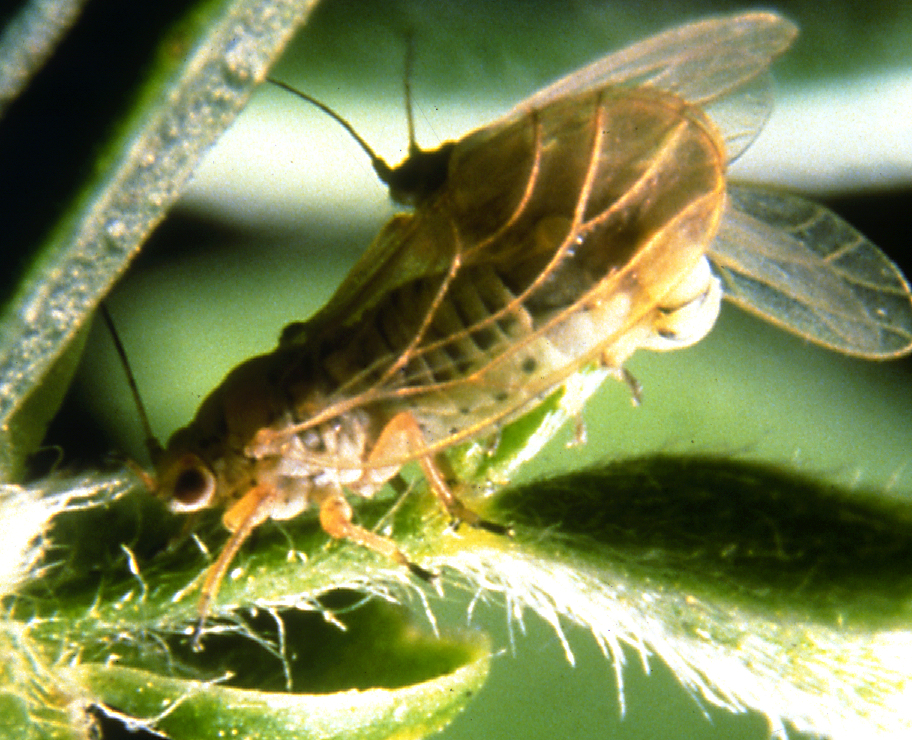
- Arytainilla spartiophila

Scientific classification
- Domain: Eukaryota
- Kingdom: Animalia
- Phylum: Arthropoda
- Class: Insecta
- Order: Hemiptera
- Suborder: Sternorrhyncha
- Family: Psyllidae
- Subfamily: Psyllinae
- Genus: Arytainilla; Loginova, 1972

= Arytainilla =

Genus of true bugs

Arytainilla is a genus of mostly Palaearctic plant lice belonging to the subfamily Psyllinae (it was previously placed in a subfamily Arytaininae); the genus was erected by Marianna Loginova in 1972. Distribution records include Europe and North Africa, with possible introductions to New Zealand, Australia and western USA. Arytainilla spartiophila is one of the two British "broom psyllids": the other is in the related genus Arytaina.

== Species ==
The Global Biodiversity Information Facility includes:

1. Arytainilla algeriensis Burckhardt, 1989
2. Arytainilla atlantica Percy, 2002
3. Arytainilla barbagalloi Rapisarda, 1986
4. Arytainilla cytisi (Puton, 1876)
5. Arytainilla delarbrei (Puton, 1873)
6. Arytainilla gredi (Ramirez Gomez, 1956)
7. Arytainilla magnicauda Ramirez Gomez, 1956
8. Arytainilla montivaga Percy, 2002
9. Arytainilla serpentina Percy, 2003
10. Arytainilla spartiicola (Šulc, 1907)
11. Arytainilla spartiophila (Foerster, 1848)
12. Arytainilla sulci (Vondráček, 1954)
13. Arytainilla telonica Percy, 2002
14. Arytainilla telonicola Percy, 2002
