= Anthocoris bakeri =

Scientific classification
- Domain: Eukaryota
- Kingdom: Animalia
- Phylum: Arthropoda
- Class: Insecta
- Order: Hemiptera
- Suborder: Heteroptera
- Family: Anthocoridae
- Genus: Anthocoris
- Species: A. bakeri

Binomial name
- Anthocoris bakeri Poppius, 1913

Species of true bug

Anthocoris bakeri is a species of minute pirate bug in the family Anthocoridae. It is found in North America.
