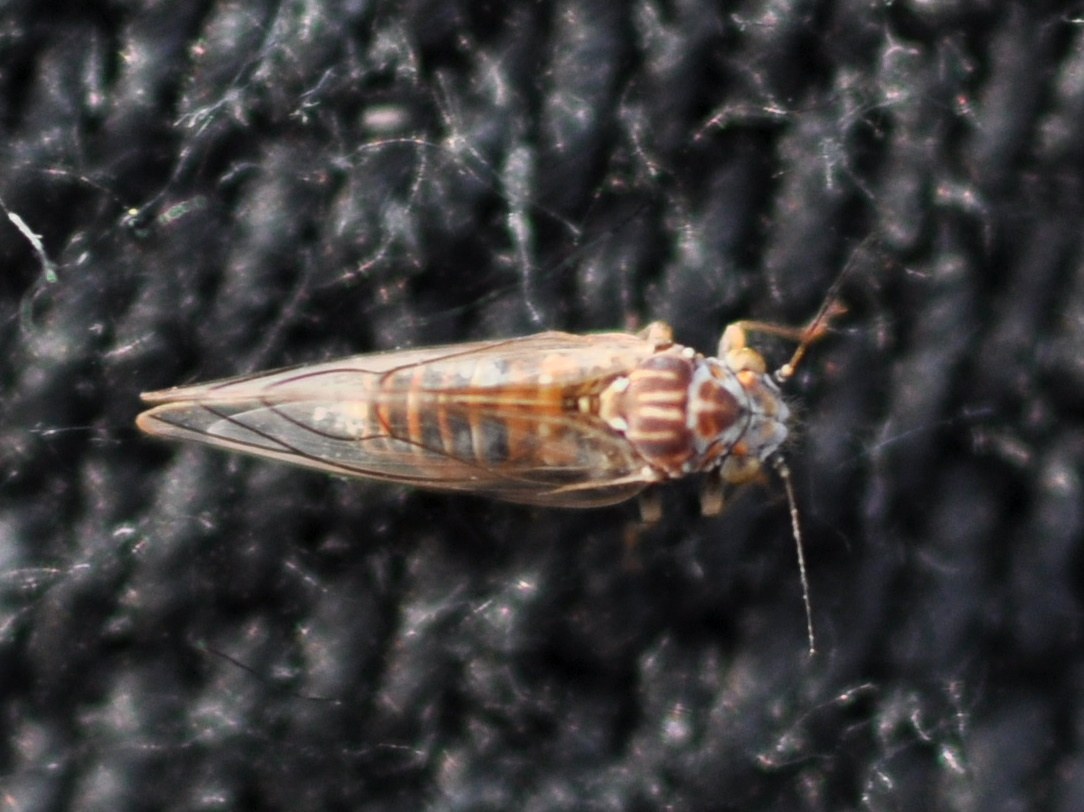
- Cacopsylla brunneipennis in Kirchwerder, Hamburg.

Scientific classification
- Domain: Eukaryota
- Kingdom: Animalia
- Phylum: Arthropoda
- Class: Insecta
- Order: Hemiptera
- Suborder: Sternorrhyncha
- Family: Psyllidae
- Subfamily: Psyllinae
- Genus: Cacopsylla; Ossiannilsson, 1970

Species
- Include: Cacopsylla elegans; Cacopsylla mali; Cacopsylla melanoneura; Cacopsylla pyri; Cacopsylla pyricola; Cacopsylla pyrisuga; Cacopsylla ulmi

= Cacopsylla =

Genus of true bugs

Cacopsylla is a genus of bugs known as jumping plant lice. It includes most of the subfamily Psyllinae harmful to fruit trees; for example, insects referred to by the common name "pear psyllids", can only develop on plants of the genus Pyrus.

== Species ==
The Global Biodiversity Information Facility lists:

1. Cacopsylla abdominalis (Meyer-Dür, 1871)
2. Cacopsylla abhippophaes (Li & Yang, 1987)
3. Cacopsylla abieti (Kuwayama, 1908)
4. Cacopsylla acanthopanaicis Li, 2011
5. Cacopsylla accincta Luo, Li, Ma & Cai, 2012
6. Cacopsylla aceriluteola Li, 2011
7. Cacopsylla acerirubera Li, 2005
8. Cacopsylla acogena Li, 2011
9. Cacopsylla acuminata (Jensen, 1956)
10. Cacopsylla affinis (Löw, 1880)
11. Cacopsylla agellialta Klimaszewski, 1993
12. Cacopsylla ailaoshanensis Li, 2011
13. Cacopsylla aili (Yang & Li, 1984)
14. Cacopsylla aisanensis (Miyatake, 1963)
15. Cacopsylla alaskensis (Ashmead, 1904)
16. Cacopsylla alaspina (Kandasamy, 1986)
17. Cacopsylla alaterni (Foerster, 1848)
18. Cacopsylla alba (Crawford, 1914)
19. Cacopsylla albagena (Caldwell, 1938)
20. Cacopsylla albigena (Miyatake, 1964)
21. Cacopsylla albipes (Flor, 1861)
22. Cacopsylla albiumbellatae (Li & Yang, 1987)
23. Cacopsylla albiverteicis Li, 2011
24. Cacopsylla albopontis (Kuwayama, 1908)
25. Cacopsylla albovenosa (Kuwayama, 1908)
26. Cacopsylla amakusensis (Kuwayama, 1939)
27. Cacopsylla ambigua (Foerster, 1848)
28. Cacopsylla americana (Crawford, 1914)
29. Cacopsylla annulata (Fitch, 1851)
30. Cacopsylla approximata Li, 2006
31. Cacopsylla aquilae Li, 2006
32. Cacopsylla araliae (Konovalova, 1981)
33. Cacopsylla arctica (Walker, 1852)
34. Cacopsylla arcuata (Loginova, 1965)
35. Cacopsylla armeniacinigra Li, 2011
36. Cacopsylla ateridorsa Li, 2011
37. Cacopsylla atlantica (Loginova, 1976)
38. Cacopsylla atriapicia Li, 2011
39. Cacopsylla aurantia Li, 2005
40. Cacopsylla aurantisalicis Li, 2005
41. Cacopsylla baccatae Cho & Burckhardt, 2017
42. Cacopsylla baeckinie Li, 2011
43. Cacopsylla baeoianna Li, 2011
44. Cacopsylla baeoivalvae Li, 2005
45. Cacopsylla bagnalli (Heslop-Harrison, 1916)
46. Cacopsylla baishanzuana Li, 1995
47. Cacopsylla basiater Li, 2011
48. Cacopsylla beckeriae Klimaszewski, 1993
49. Cacopsylla beijingica Li, 2011
50. Cacopsylla betulaefoliae (Yang & Li, 1981)
51. Cacopsylla bibari (Kwon, 1983)
52. Cacopsylla bidens (Šulc, 1907)
53. Cacopsylla biwa Inoue, 2014
54. Cacopsylla bomihippophaes (Li & Yang, 1988)
55. Cacopsylla bomisalicis Li, 2011
56. Cacopsylla boninofatsiae Inoue & Miyatake, 2001
57. Cacopsylla borealis S.Nokkala & Ch.Nokkala, 2019
58. Cacopsylla brevianna Li, 2011
59. Cacopsylla breviantenna Li, 2011
60. Cacopsylla breviantennata (Flor, 1861)
61. Cacopsylla breviata (Patch, 1912)
62. Cacopsylla brevilaricis Li, 2011
63. Cacopsylla brevipunctata Li, 2005
64. Cacopsylla brevistigmata (Patch, 1912)
65. Cacopsylla breviverticis Li, 1990
66. Cacopsylla brunnea (Provancher, 1872)
67. Cacopsylla brunneipennis (Edwards, 1896)
68. Cacopsylla bulbosa (Tuthill, 1943)
69. Cacopsylla burckhardti Luo, Li, Ma & Cai, 2012
70. Cacopsylla canditata (Yang, 1984)
71. Cacopsylla cangshanli (Yang & Li, 1984)
72. Cacopsylla cephaloeuria (Li, 2011)
73. Cacopsylla changbaiacera Li, 2011
74. Cacopsylla changbaibetula Li, 2011
75. Cacopsylla cheilophilae (Li & Yang, 1987)
76. Cacopsylla chinensis (Yang & Li, 1981)
77. Cacopsylla chrysocoela Li, 2011
78. Cacopsylla ciacanthopanacis Li, 2011
79. Cacopsylla ciliensis Li, 1993
80. Cacopsylla citricola (Yang & Li, 1984)
81. Cacopsylla citrinimaculata Li, 2005
82. Cacopsylla citrisuga (Yang & Li, 1984)
83. Cacopsylla clauda (Yang, 1984)
84. Cacopsylla clausenisuga Li & Yang, 1991
85. Cacopsylla clavimaculata Li, 2011
86. Cacopsylla coccinea (Kuwayama, 1908)
87. Cacopsylla compar (Loginova, 1964)
88. Cacopsylla confusa (Tuthill, 1943)
89. Cacopsylla consobrina (Loginova, 1978)
90. Cacopsylla corcontum (Šulc, 1909)
91. Cacopsylla coryli (Patch, 1912)
92. Cacopsylla cotoneasteris (Loginova, 1964)
93. Cacopsylla cotoneastisuga Li, 2011
94. Cacopsylla crataegi (Schrank, 1801)
95. Cacopsylla crenulatae Bastin, Burckhardt & Ouvrard, 2023
96. Cacopsylla cretica (Klimaszewski, 1969)
97. Cacopsylla cryptomeriae Li, 2011
98. Cacopsylla curta (Tuthill, 1943)
99. Cacopsylla curtiantenna Li, 2005
100. Cacopsylla cyphospila Li, 2011
101. Cacopsylla dactylina Li, 2011
102. Cacopsylla denticulata Li, 2011
103. Cacopsylla dianli (Yang & Li, 1984)
104. Cacopsylla diannsnsis Li, 2011
105. Cacopsylla diaphana (Konovalova, 1981) Cho, Burckhardt & Lee, 2022
106. Cacopsylla dichohippophae (Li, 2011)
107. Cacopsylla dicrocephala Li, 2011
108. Cacopsylla difficilis (Tuthill, 1943)
109. Cacopsylla dilonchi (Caldwell, 1938)
110. Cacopsylla dissicoliacera Li, 2011
111. Cacopsylla dissimilis (Baeva, 1963)
112. Cacopsylla dolichogena (Li, 2005)
113. Cacopsylla dolichotaena Li, 2011
114. Cacopsylla donggangica Li, 2011
115. Cacopsylla ectoundata Li, 2011
116. Cacopsylla elaeagni (Kuwayama, 1908)
117. Cacopsylla elaeagnicola (Miyatake, 1963)
118. Cacopsylla elegans Inoue, 2004
119. Cacopsylla elegantissima (Loginova, 1964)
120. Cacopsylla elegantula (Zetterstedt, 1840)
121. Cacopsylla elsholtziae (Li & Yang, 1987)
122. Cacopsylla erhaili (Li & Yang, 1984)
123. Cacopsylla erlongheica Li, 2011
124. Cacopsylla euonymae Li, 2011
125. Cacopsylla euryocephala Li, 2011
126. Cacopsylla euryptera (Li, 2011)
127. Cacopsylla evodiae (Miyatake, 1965)
128. Cacopsylla exima (Loginova, 1976)
129. Cacopsylla fagarae (Fang & Yang, 1986)
130. Cacopsylla falcata Luo, 2016
131. Cacopsylla fangi Li, 2011
132. Cacopsylla fanjingshanana Li & Yang, 1988
133. Cacopsylla fatsiae (Jensen, 1957)
134. Cacopsylla fengqingica Li, 2011
135. Cacopsylla fera (Baeva, 1968)
136. Cacopsylla fibulata (Crawford, 1914)
137. Cacopsylla flavianthracina Li, 2011
138. Cacopsylla flaviatera Li, 2011
139. Cacopsylla flavisalicis Li & Yang, 1992
140. Cacopsylla flavovirens Li & Yang, 1988
141. Cacopsylla flexipenis Li, 2011
142. Cacopsylla flori (Puton, 1871)
143. Cacopsylla fluctimaculata Li, 2005
144. Cacopsylla fluctisalicis Li, 2011
145. Cacopsylla foliprominens Li, 2005
146. Cacopsylla forcipisalicis Li & Yang, 1992
147. Cacopsylla fraterna (Gegechkori, 1977)
148. Cacopsylla fraudatrix Labina & Kuznetsova, 2012
149. Cacopsylla fulctosalaricis Li, 2011
150. Cacopsylla fulguralis (Kuwayama, 1908)
151. Cacopsylla fuluitaeniana Li & Yang, 2011
152. Cacopsylla galactocephala Li, 2011
153. Cacopsylla gansalicis Li, 2005
154. Cacopsylla gossypinifasca Li, 2011
155. Cacopsylla gossypinmaculosa Li, 2011
156. Cacopsylla gracilenta Li, 1990
157. Cacopsylla graciscapa Li, 2005
158. Cacopsylla gradita Li, 2011
159. Cacopsylla groenlandica (Šulc, 1913)
160. Cacopsylla guangtoushansalicis Li, 2011
161. Cacopsylla guangwui Li, 2011
162. Cacopsylla guangxihederae Li & Yang, 1991
163. Cacopsylla gyrogenna Li, 2011
164. Cacopsylla habrospila Li, 2011
165. Cacopsylla haimatsucola (Miyatake, 1964)
166. Cacopsylla hakonensis (Kuwayama, 1908)
167. Cacopsylla haliaeeti (Hodkinson, 1978)
168. Cacopsylla hamata (Tuthill, 1944)
169. Cacopsylla hanlabori (Kwon, 1983)
170. Cacopsylla hebephyllae Li, 2011
171. Cacopsylla hederae (Miyatake, 1964)
172. Cacopsylla hederisuga Li & Yang, 1991
173. Cacopsylla heilongjiangica Li, 2011
174. Cacopsylla heterogena Li, 2011
175. Cacopsylla highwoodensis (Hodkinson, 1978)
176. Cacopsylla himalayisalicis (Li & Yang, 1987)
177. Cacopsylla hippophaes (Foerster, 1848)
178. Cacopsylla hirsuta (Tuthill, 1938)
179. Cacopsylla hongyuanica Li, 2011
180. Cacopsylla horii (Kuwayama, 1943)
181. Cacopsylla huabeilaricis Li, 2011
182. Cacopsylla hui (Li & Yang, 1987)
183. Cacopsylla hunjiangica Li, 2011
184. Cacopsylla hyalinonemae Li & Yang, 1989
185. Cacopsylla immargimaculata Li, 2011
186. Cacopsylla incerta (Baeva, 1972)
187. Cacopsylla initialis (Loginova, 1966) Cho, Burckhardt & Lee, 2022
188. Cacopsylla insignita (Tuthill, 1943)
189. Cacopsylla insularis Inoue & Miyatake, 2001
190. Cacopsylla intacta (Loginova, 1964)
191. Cacopsylla intergerina (Loginova, 1966)
192. Cacopsylla intermedia (Löw, 1888)
193. Cacopsylla iranica Burckhardt & Lauterer, 1993
194. Cacopsylla isocerata Li, 2011
195. Cacopsylla iteophila (Löw, 1876)
196. Cacopsylla jaculatoria Li, 2011
197. Cacopsylla japonica (Kuwayama, 1955)
198. Cacopsylla jenseni (Hodkinson, 1978)
199. Cacopsylla jezoensis (Miyatake, 1963)
200. Cacopsylla jiangipiceae Li, 2011
201. Cacopsylla jigongumbellatae Li, 2011
202. Cacopsylla jinaphippophae Li, 2011
203. Cacopsylla jiugongshanica Li, 2011
204. Cacopsylla jiuzhairobea Li, 2011
205. Cacopsylla jukyungi (Kwon, 1983)
206. Cacopsylla juwangsana (Kwon, 1983)
207. Cacopsylla kananaskensis (Hodkinson, 1976)
208. Cacopsylla kimae Kwon & Kwon, 2020
209. Cacopsylla kiushuensis (Kuwayama, 1908)
210. Cacopsylla kongoensis (Miyatake, 1982)
211. Cacopsylla koreacola (Kwon, 1983)
212. Cacopsylla kunlunshanica Li, 2011
213. Cacopsylla kunmingli (Yang & Li, 1984)
214. Cacopsylla kwonorum Cho & Burckhardt, 2022
215. Cacopsylla lambdoidea Li, 2011
216. Cacopsylla lapidea Klimaszewski, 1993
217. Cacopsylla lapponica S.Nokkala & Ch.Nokkala, 2019
218. Cacopsylla laricirubera Li, 2011
219. Cacopsylla laricis Li, 1997
220. Cacopsylla latiforceps (Tuthill, 1943)
221. Cacopsylla latihippophae Li, 1997
222. Cacopsylla latipenis Li, 2011
223. Cacopsylla ledi (Flor, 1861)
224. Cacopsylla lembodes Li, 2005
225. Cacopsylla leptogena Li, 2011
226. Cacopsylla leptogramma Li, 2011
227. Cacopsylla liangheiensis Li, 2005
228. Cacopsylla liaoacera Li, 2011
229. Cacopsylla liaoli (Yang & Li, 1981)
230. Cacopsylla liaoningiensis Li, 1995
231. Cacopsylla licina Li & Yang, 1999
232. Cacopsylla lijiangica Li, 2011
233. Cacopsylla limbata (Meyer-Dür, 1871)
234. Cacopsylla lineaticeps (Kwon, 1983)
235. Cacopsylla lingnanensis Li, 1993
236. Cacopsylla liricapita Li, 2011
237. Cacopsylla longicornis Li & Yang, 1992
238. Cacopsylla longiforceps (Hodkinson, 1978)
239. Cacopsylla longigena (Mathur, 1975)
240. Cacopsylla longiventris Kwon & Kwon, 2020
241. Cacopsylla loriformis Li, 2005
242. Cacopsylla luotongshanana Li, 1995
243. Cacopsylla luteolisalicis Li, 2011
244. Cacopsylla lyoniae Li, 2011
245. Cacopsylla macleani (Hodkinson, 1978)
246. Cacopsylla macrogena Li, 2006
247. Cacopsylla macroscalpra Li, 2011
248. Cacopsylla maculata (Crawford, 1914)
249. Cacopsylla maculatili Li, 2011
250. Cacopsylla maculipennis Inoue & Miyatake, 2001
251. Cacopsylla maculiumbellatae Li & Yang, 1987
252. Cacopsylla magna (Crawford, 1914)
253. Cacopsylla magnicauda (Crawford, 1914)
254. Cacopsylla magnisalignea Li, 2011
255. Cacopsylla mainlingica Li, 2011
256. Cacopsylla mali (Schmidberger, 1836) - type species (as Chermes mali Schmidberger)
257. Cacopsylla malicola Li, 1992
258. Cacopsylla malivorella (Matsumura, 1915)
259. Cacopsylla manisi (Tuthill, 1943)
260. Cacopsylla mariannae (Baeva, 1966)
261. Cacopsylla matsumurai (Miyatake, 1964)
262. Cacopsylla media (Tuthill, 1943)
263. Cacopsylla melanoneura (Foerster, 1848)
264. Cacopsylla melaocoela (Li, 2011)
265. Cacopsylla melaogena Li, 2011
266. Cacopsylla memor (Loginova, 1964)
267. Cacopsylla meniscata (Li, 2011)
268. Cacopsylla menyuanica Li, 2011
269. Cacopsylla merita (Loginova, 1964)
270. Cacopsylla microgena Li, 2011
271. Cacopsylla midoriae (Miyatake, 1963)
272. Cacopsylla miniata Li, 2011
273. Cacopsylla minor (Crawford, 1914)
274. Cacopsylla minuta (Crawford, 1914)
275. Cacopsylla moiwasana (Kuwayama, 1908)
276. Cacopsylla moscovita (Andrianova, 1948)
277. Cacopsylla mucronulata Li, 2011
278. Cacopsylla multiflorae Li, 2011
279. Cacopsylla multijuga (Yang, 1984)
280. Cacopsylla multispinia Li, 2011
281. Cacopsylla murrayi (Mathur, 1975)
282. Cacopsylla mutilata Li, 1997
283. Cacopsylla myriacantha Li, 2011
284. Cacopsylla myrthi (Puton, 1876)
285. Cacopsylla myrtilli (Wagner, 1947)
286. Cacopsylla namjagbarwana (Li & Yang, 1988)
287. Cacopsylla nana (Tuthill, 1938)
288. Cacopsylla nasuta (Horváth, 1904)
289. Cacopsylla negundinis (Mally, 1894)
290. Cacopsylla nervinigra Li, 2011
291. Cacopsylla nigella (Konovalova, 1979)
292. Cacopsylla nigraimaculata Li, 2011
293. Cacopsylla nigranervosa (Jensen, 1956)
294. Cacopsylla nigriantennata (Kuwayama, 1908)
295. Cacopsylla nigrigenimacula Li, 2011
296. Cacopsylla nigrimarginalis Li & Yang, 1999
297. Cacopsylla nigrita (Zetterstedt, 1828)
298. Cacopsylla ningxiaiacera Li, 2011
299. Cacopsylla nobilis Li, 2011
300. Cacopsylla nocturna Luo, 2016
301. Cacopsylla nopeunsanicola (Kwon, 1983)
302. Cacopsylla nordica (Jensen, 1951)
303. Cacopsylla notapennis (Jensen, 1956)
304. Cacopsylla notata (Flor, 1861)
305. Cacopsylla nyingchisalicis (Li & Yang, 1988)
306. Cacopsylla obinuncana Li, 2011
307. Cacopsylla obunca (Yang, 1984)
308. Cacopsylla oluanpiensis (Yang, 1984)
309. Cacopsylla omani (Tuthill, 1943)
310. Cacopsylla ophiocephala Li, 2011
311. Cacopsylla oritrephae Li, 2011
312. Cacopsylla oropha Li, 2011
313. Cacopsylla orthoconica Li, 2011
314. Cacopsylla palgongsana (Kwon, 1983)
315. Cacopsylla palmeni (Löw, 1882)
316. Cacopsylla pantogramma Li & Yang, 2011
317. Cacopsylla parallela (Crawford, 1914)
318. Cacopsylla pararibesiae (Jensen, 1956)
319. Cacopsylla paraspiculata Lashkari & Burckhardt, 2020
320. Cacopsylla parvipennis (Löw, 1877)
321. Cacopsylla penicillata Li, 2011
322. Cacopsylla peninsularis (Kwon, 1983)
323. Cacopsylla peregrina (Foerster, 1848)
324. Cacopsylla permixta Burckhardt & Hodkinson, 1986
325. Cacopsylla perrieri Lauterer & Burckhardt, 1997
326. Cacopsylla phaeocarpae (Yang & Li, 1981)
327. Cacopsylla phaseola Li, 2011
328. Cacopsylla phlebophyllae (Hodkinson, 1978)
329. Cacopsylla phymatophora Li, 1990
330. Cacopsylla piceae Li, 2011
331. Cacopsylla piceiantenna Li, 2011
332. Cacopsylla piceiaurantia Li, 2011
333. Cacopsylla picta (Foerster, 1848)
334. Cacopsylla pieridis (Li & Yang, 1987)
335. Cacopsylla pingliangica Li, 2011
336. Cacopsylla platyodicra Li, 2005
337. Cacopsylla popovi Klimaszewski, 1993
338. Cacopsylla populicola Li, 2011
339. Cacopsylla prinsepiae Li, 2011
340. Cacopsylla procurva (Li, 2011)
341. Cacopsylla prominens Li, 2011
342. Cacopsylla propinqua (Schaefer, 1949)
343. Cacopsylla propria (Tuthill, 1943)
344. Cacopsylla pruni (Scopoli, 1763)
345. Cacopsylla pseudosieboldiani (Konovalova & Loginova, 1985)
346. Cacopsylla pseudoviburni (Kwon, 1983)
347. Cacopsylla psilostigmaea Li, 2011
348. Cacopsylla pulchella (Löw, 1877)
349. Cacopsylla pulchra (Zetterstedt, 1840)
350. Cacopsylla pyri (Linnaeus, 1758)
351. Cacopsylla pyricola (Foerster, 1848)
352. Cacopsylla pyrisuga (Foerster, 1848)
353. Cacopsylla qianli (Yang & Li, 1984)
354. Cacopsylla qilianensis Luo, 2016
355. Cacopsylla qinlingielaeagnae Li, 2005
356. Cacopsylla quadraticonica Li, 2011
357. Cacopsylla quadratisalicis Li & Yang, 1992
358. Cacopsylla quadrilineata (Fitch, 1851)
359. Cacopsylla quadrimaculata (Mathur, 1975)
360. Cacopsylla quattuorimegma Li, 2011
361. Cacopsylla quinimaculata Li, 2011
362. Cacopsylla rara (Tuthill, 1944)
363. Cacopsylla recava Li, 2001
364. Cacopsylla reclinata Li, 2011
365. Cacopsylla rectinerva Li, 2011
366. Cacopsylla rhamnicola (Scott, 1876)
367. Cacopsylla rhododendri (Puton, 1871)
368. Cacopsylla ribesiae (Crawford, 1911)
369. Cacopsylla ribis (Patch, 1912)
370. Cacopsylla rubidimaculata Li, 2011
371. Cacopsylla rufipennis Hodkinson, 1978
372. Cacopsylla saliceti (Foerster, 1848)
373. Cacopsylla salicirubera Li, 2011
374. Cacopsylla saligna (Loginova, 1966)
375. Cacopsylla salmonacer Li, 2011
376. Cacopsylla salmoneicapita Li, 2011
377. Cacopsylla sandolbaea (Park & Lee, 1982)
378. Cacopsylla sangjaei (Kwon, 1983)
379. Cacopsylla santali (Mathur, 1975)
380. Cacopsylla satsumensis (Kuwayama, 1908)
381. Cacopsylla scamboelaeagna Li, 2011
382. Cacopsylla schefflerae (Yang, 1984)
383. Cacopsylla seolagsana (Kwon, 1983)
384. Cacopsylla septentrionalis (Šulc, 1939)
385. Cacopsylla septmimaculata Li, 2011
386. Cacopsylla serpentina Li & Yang, 1992
387. Cacopsylla serpuliformis Li, 2011
388. Cacopsylla seungmoi (Kwon, 1983)
389. Cacopsylla sextuplex Li, 2005
390. Cacopsylla shanghaiensis (Chen & Wu, 2008)
391. Cacopsylla shanheica Li, 2011
392. Cacopsylla shillongensis (Lahiri & Biswas, 1990)
393. Cacopsylla shizishanica Li, 2011
394. Cacopsylla sikkismisalicis Li, 2011
395. Cacopsylla silvestris (Kwon, 1983)
396. Cacopsylla simaoli (Li & Yang, 1984)
397. Cacopsylla sinualisalicis Li, 2005
398. Cacopsylla sinuata Crawford, 1914
399. Cacopsylla songshana Li, 2011
400. Cacopsylla sorbi (Linnaeus, 1767)
401. Cacopsylla sorbicola (Miyatake, 1963)
402. Cacopsylla spatiosicuspis Li, 2006
403. Cacopsylla sphaeroidalis Li & Yang, 2011
404. Cacopsylla spiculata (Jensen, 1951)
405. Cacopsylla spinata Li, 1997
406. Cacopsylla spiraeicola (Li, 2011) Luo, Li & Cai, 2016
407. Cacopsylla steinbergi (Loginova, 1964)
408. Cacopsylla stenofurca Li, 2011
409. Cacopsylla striata (Patch, 1911)
410. Cacopsylla stricklandi (Caldwell, 1939)
411. Cacopsylla strigosa Li, 2011
412. Cacopsylla stylariflavescens Li & Yang, 1999
413. Cacopsylla styloidea Li, 2005
414. Cacopsylla subcoccinea (Kwon, 1983)
415. Cacopsylla subconica Li, 2011
416. Cacopsylla subpropinqua (Loginova, 1966)
417. Cacopsylla subspiculata (Hodkinson, 1976)
418. Cacopsylla subtilis Li, 2011
419. Cacopsylla sulcata (Mathur, 1973)
420. Cacopsylla suturalis (Horváth, 1897)
421. Cacopsylla sylvestrisuga Li, 1990
422. Cacopsylla taibaishanensis Li, 2011
423. Cacopsylla taitoensis (Fang & Yang, 1986)
424. Cacopsylla talhouki Burckhardt, 1986
425. Cacopsylla tatrica Lauterer & Burckhardt, 1994
426. Cacopsylla taurica Klimaszewski, 1993
427. Cacopsylla tengchongica Li, 2011
428. Cacopsylla tenuata (Jensen, 1951)
429. Cacopsylla teretigena Li, 2011
430. Cacopsylla terminigra Li, 2011
431. Cacopsylla ternstroemiae (Kandasamy, 1986)
432. Cacopsylla tewoensis Li, 2005
433. Cacopsylla thibetihippophaes (Li & Yang, 1987)
434. Cacopsylla thibetisorbi (Li & Yang, 1987)
435. Cacopsylla tianchiensis Li, 2011
436. Cacopsylla tianmushanica Li, 2001
437. Cacopsylla tingriana (Li & Yang, 1987)
438. Cacopsylla tobirae (Miyatake, 1964)
439. Cacopsylla toddaliae (Yang, 1984)
440. Cacopsylla toolikensis (Hodkinson, 1978)
441. Cacopsylla toroenensis (Kuwayama, 1908)
442. Cacopsylla trigona Zhang et al., 2019
443. Cacopsylla trigonoivertia Li, 2011
444. Cacopsylla truncisalicis Li, 2011
445. Cacopsylla tumdensis (Li, 2011)
446. Cacopsylla tuthilli (Caldwell, 1939)
447. Cacopsylla uenoi (Matsumoto, 1995)
448. Cacopsylla ulleungensis (Kwon, 1983)
449. Cacopsylla ulmi (Foerster, 1848)
450. Cacopsylla unionidentia Li, 2011
451. Cacopsylla unipunctata Li, 2005
452. Cacopsylla urticaecolens (Walker, 1852)
453. Cacopsylla usitata (Tuthill, 1943)
454. Cacopsylla vaccinii (Miyatake, 1964)
455. Cacopsylla viburni (Löw, 1876)
456. Cacopsylla viburnicola (Li & Yang) Li & Yang, 1992
457. Cacopsylla visci (Curtis, 1835)
458. Cacopsylla vondraceki (Klimaszewski, 1963)
459. Cacopsylla vulgahippophaes (Li & Yang, 1987)
460. Cacopsylla vulgaisalicis Li, 2011
461. Cacopsylla weii Li, 2011
462. Cacopsylla wenshuiensis Li, 2011
463. Cacopsylla wolongica Li, 2011
464. Cacopsylla wushanelaeagna Li, 1997
465. Cacopsylla wutaishanica Li, 2011
466. Cacopsylla wuxiana Li, 1997
467. Cacopsylla xanthisma (Yang & Li, 1984)
468. Cacopsylla xanthoprocta Li, 2011
469. Cacopsylla xiaguanli (Li & Yang, 1984)
470. Cacopsylla xiangshanica Li, 2011
471. Cacopsylla xibuensis Li, 2011
472. Cacopsylla yadongsalicis (Li & Yang, 1987)
473. Cacopsylla yakouensis (Yang, 1984)
474. Cacopsylla yangi Li, 2011
475. Cacopsylla yosemitensis (Jensen, 1951)
476. Cacopsylla yukawai Inoue, 2004
477. Cacopsylla yunae Kwon & Kwon, 2020
478. Cacopsylla yunli (Yang & Li, 1984)
479. Cacopsylla yunnanpini Li, 2011
480. Cacopsylla zaicevi (Šulc, 1915)
481. Cacopsylla zanghippophaes (Li & Yang, 1987)
482. Cacopsylla zetterstedti (Thomson, 1877)
483. Cacopsylla zhamogihippophaes Li, 2011
484. Cacopsylla zheielaeagna Li, 2011
485. Cacopsylla zhoushanensis Li, 2011
486. Cacopsylla zibrina Li, 2011
487. Cacopsylla zinovjevi (Loginova, 1965)
