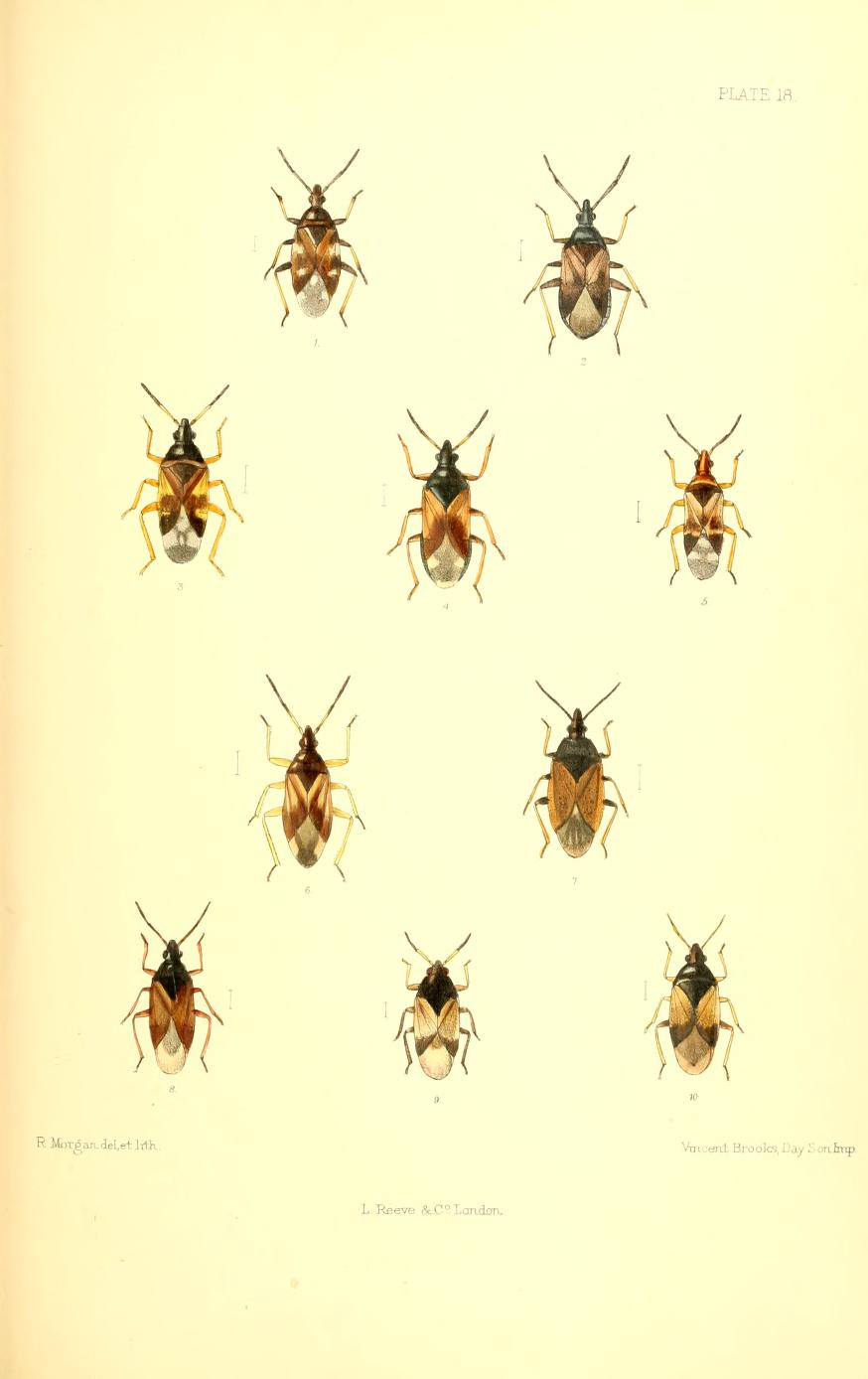
- Anthocoris gallarumulmi depicted in Edward Saunders Hemiptera Heteroptera of the British Islands (figure 4)

Scientific classification
- Domain: Eukaryota
- Kingdom: Animalia
- Phylum: Arthropoda
- Class: Insecta
- Order: Hemiptera
- Suborder: Heteroptera
- Family: Anthocoridae
- Genus: Anthocoris
- Species: A. gallarumulmi

Binomial name
- Anthocoris gallarumulmi (De Geer 1773)

= Anthocoris gallarumulmi =

Species of true bug

Anthocoris gallarumulmi is a true bug in the family Anthocoridae. The species is a West Palearctic species found on aphid-galled leaves of Ulmus minor and is a predator of the aphid Eriosoma ulmi It is also associated with aphid-leaf galls of Fraxinus excelsior, Ribes, Prunus spinosa and Crataegus monogyna.
