= Anthocoris musculus =

Scientific classification
- Domain: Eukaryota
- Kingdom: Animalia
- Phylum: Arthropoda
- Class: Insecta
- Order: Hemiptera
- Suborder: Heteroptera
- Family: Anthocoridae
- Genus: Anthocoris
- Species: A. musculus

Binomial name
- Anthocoris musculus (Say, 1832)

Species of true bug

Anthocoris musculus is a species of minute pirate bug in the family Anthocoridae. It is found in Europe & Northern Asia (excluding China) and North America.
