= Anthocoris dimorphicus =

Scientific classification
- Domain: Eukaryota
- Kingdom: Animalia
- Phylum: Arthropoda
- Class: Insecta
- Order: Hemiptera
- Suborder: Heteroptera
- Family: Anthocoridae
- Genus: Anthocoris
- Species: A. dimorphicus

Binomial name
- Anthocoris dimorphicus Anderson & Kelton, 1963

Species of true bug

Anthocoris dimorphicus is a species of minute pirate bug in the family Anthocoridae. It is found in North America.
