= Deraeocoris brevis =

Scientific classification
- Domain: Eukaryota
- Kingdom: Animalia
- Phylum: Arthropoda
- Class: Insecta
- Order: Hemiptera
- Suborder: Heteroptera
- Family: Miridae
- Genus: Deraeocoris
- Species: D. brevis

Binomial name
- Deraeocoris brevis (Uhler, 1904)

Species of true bug

Deraeocoris brevis is a species of predatory plant bug in the family Miridae. It is native to North America where it feeds on plant pests in apple and pear orchards.

== Description ==
D. brevis is a hemimetabolous insect, undergoing incomplete metamorphosis. Adults are 3 to 6 mm (0.12 to 0.24 in) long and a glossy black colour. The nymphs are a mottled pale grey, with dark patches on the body giving them a spotted appearance. The dorsal surface is felted with grey hairs, and a cottony secretion covers the body; the eyes are red. The eggs are long and slender, but are largely concealed in the plant tissues into which they are inserted.

== Hosts ==
The species is found in both apple and pear orchards in the Pacific Northwest where the insect is considered beneficial. It also feeds and shelters in other trees and shrubs including service berry, tobacco brush, mountain mahogany, white fir, various pines, Arbutus, black oak and manzanita. Its presence in orchards is enhanced where there is natural woodland close by. Both adults and nymphs of this bug are predatory, feeding on a range of prey including spider mites, aphids, pear psyllids, leafhoppers and scale insects. If there is a shortage of insect prey in apple and pear orchards, these bugs are able to feed on plant tissues without damaging the trees to any great extent.

== Life cycle ==
Adult D. brevis overwinter hiding in cracks and crevices. In the spring, the adult female lays its eggs on suitable host trees near the developing buds while in the summer it inserts the eggs into plant tissues such as the midribs of leaves. The eggs hatch in two to three weeks and then pass through five nymphal instars. At 70 °F (21 °C), nymphal development takes about 25 days in the laboratory, and during this period, up to 400 eggs and nymphs of the pear psyllid (Psylla pyri) are consumed.
