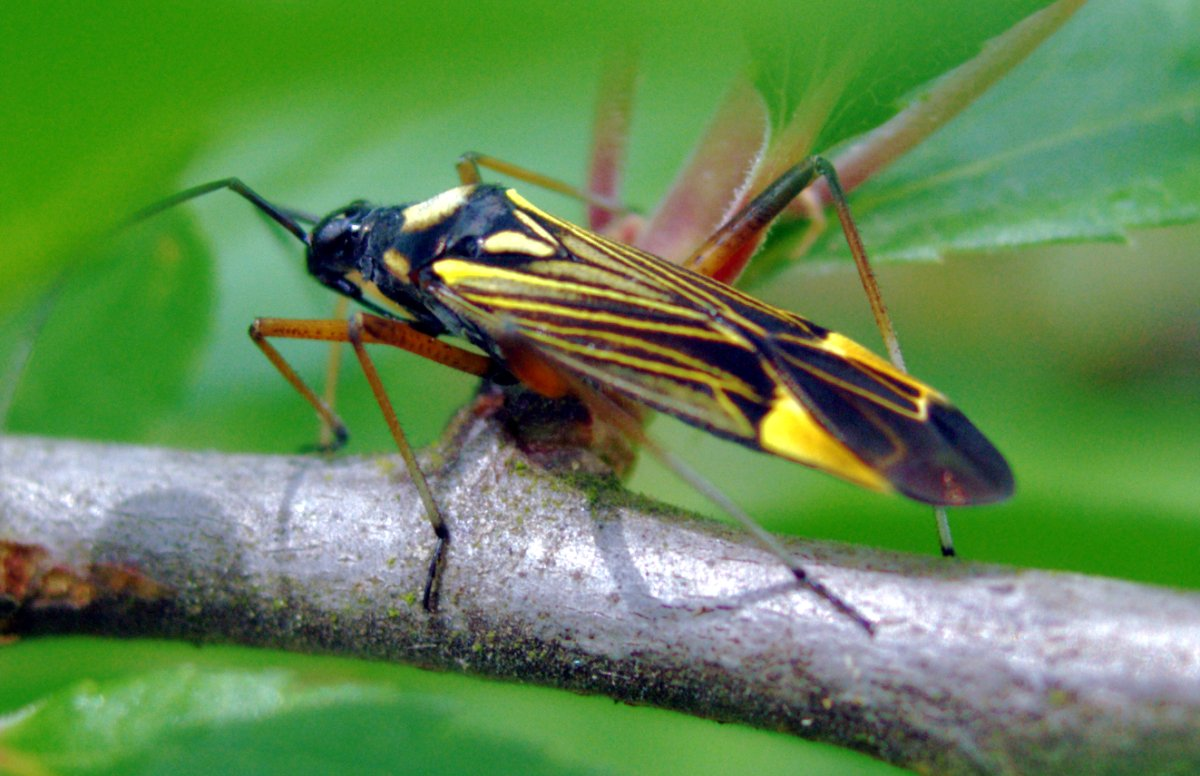
- Miris striatus, Münster, Germany, 2004

Scientific classification
- Domain: Eukaryota
- Kingdom: Animalia
- Phylum: Arthropoda
- Class: Insecta
- Order: Hemiptera
- Suborder: Heteroptera
- Family: Miridae
- Tribe: Mirini
- Genus: Miris; Fabricius, 1794

= Miris =

Genus of true bugs

Miris is genus of true bugs belonging to the family Miridae, subfamily Mirinae. The genus was first described in 1794 by Johan Christian Fabricius.

== Species ==
The Pan-European species directory and BioLib list:

1. Miris nebrodensis Carapezza, 1991
2. Miris persicus (Reuter, 1876)
3. Miris striatus (Linnaeus, 1758) - type species (as Cimex striatus L., 1758)

Species in this genus are largely found in Europe, having been collected in Germany, Bulgaria, Netherlands and France; there are also records from the British Isles, Scandinavia and western Russia.
