= Glyphina =

Scientific classification
- Domain: Eukaryota
- Kingdom: Animalia
- Phylum: Arthropoda
- Class: Insecta
- Order: Hemiptera
- Suborder: Sternorrhyncha
- Family: Aphididae
- Subfamily: Thelaxinae
- Genus: Glyphina; Koch, 1856

Synonyms
- Tremulinax Amyot, 1847

Genus of true bugs

Glyphina is a genus of aphids belonging to the family Aphididae.

The genus was first described by Carl Ludwig Koch in 1856.

The species of this genus are found in Europe and Northern America.

Species:

- Glyphina betulae
- Glyphina schrankiana
