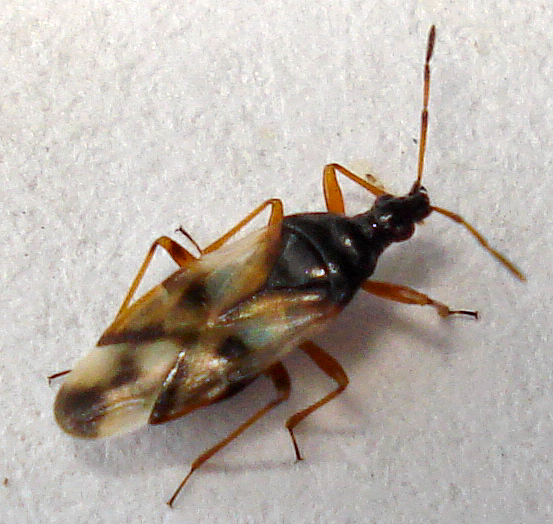
- Adult of Anthocoris nemorum

Scientific classification
- Kingdom: Animalia
- Phylum: Arthropoda
- Clade: Pancrustacea
- Class: Insecta
- Order: Hemiptera
- Suborder: Heteroptera
- Family: Anthocoridae
- Genus: Anthocoris
- Species: A. nemorum

Binomial name
- Anthocoris nemorum (Linnaeus, 1761)

= Common flowerbug =

Species of true bug

The common flowerbug (Anthocoris nemorum) is a common minute pirate or flower bug.

== Distribution ==
The common flowerbug is found across Europe and the Palearctic to China. It is common in Great Britain and Ireland. In the Alps it is found to about 2000 meters above sea level.

== Habitat ==
It more commonly inhabits lower moist, shaded vegetation than trees, and especially nettles in the later half of the growing season.

== Description ==
Video clip of Anthocoris nemorum with prey

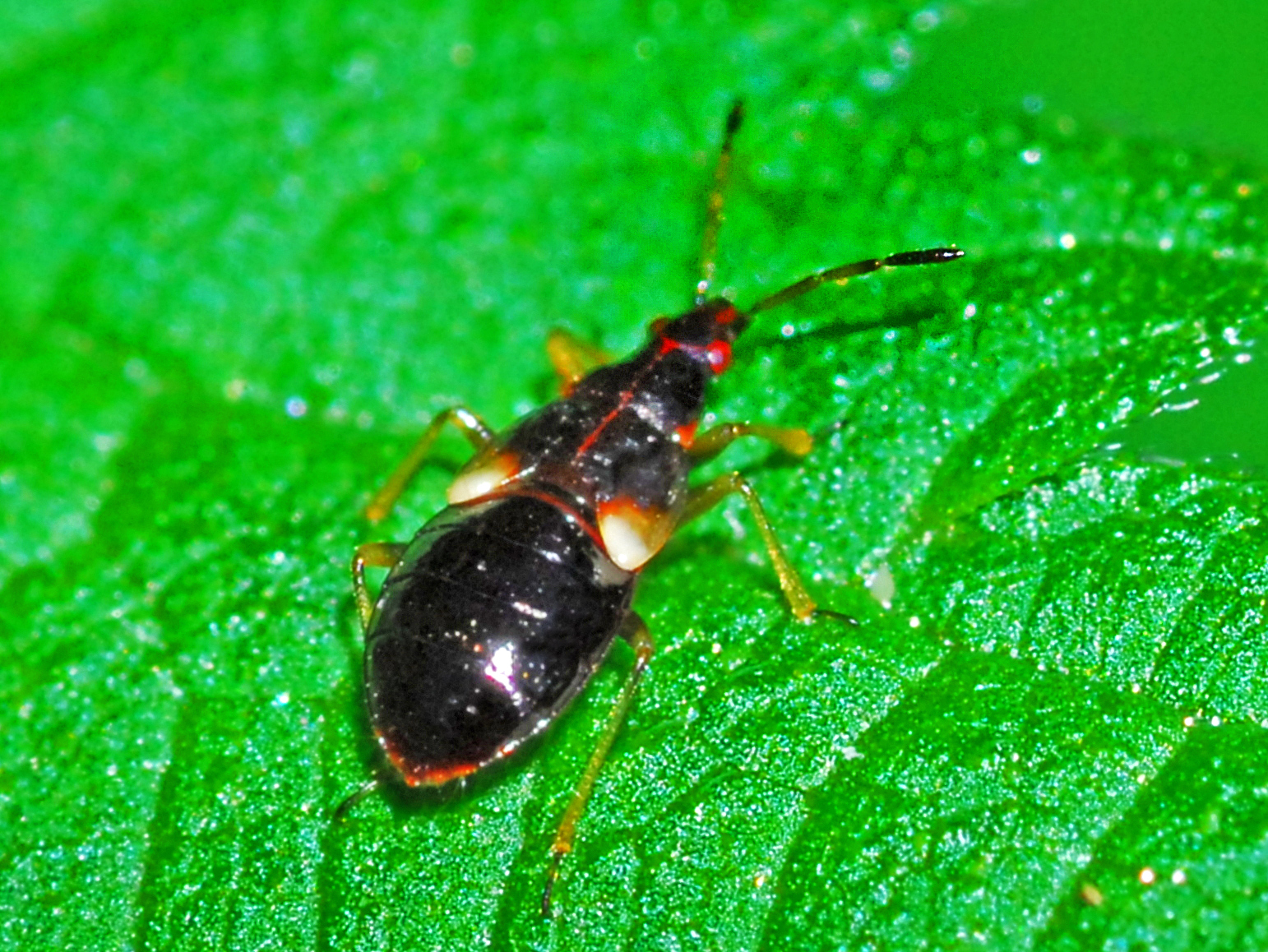
A nymph of Anthocoris nemorum

Anthocoris nemorum is typically 3–4 mm in length. These bugs have soft elongated flat bodies, with reflective forewings and black pronotum. The legs are mostly orange-brown, with small dark patches close to the tips of the femora. The antennae are mainly orange, with dark tips. In particular, antennal segments I and IV are usually dark, while II and III are pale with dark apices. The front wing is shiny transparent with a distinctive black dot in the center. The membrane shows an hourglass-shaped characteristic black spot at the wing tip. Nymphs of Anthocoris nemorum are dark brown or reddish brown.

== Biology ==
Adults can be found all year. They are predatory insects, feeding on small insects including aphids and red spider mites. A. nemorum lays its eggs inside plant leaves. It has been used as a biological pest control since 1992, primarily to control Cacopsylla pyri. It is capable of biting humans.
