= Anthocoris whitei =

Scientific classification
- Domain: Eukaryota
- Kingdom: Animalia
- Phylum: Arthropoda
- Class: Insecta
- Order: Hemiptera
- Suborder: Heteroptera
- Family: Anthocoridae
- Genus: Anthocoris
- Species: A. whitei

Binomial name
- Anthocoris whitei Reuter, 1884

Species of true bug

Anthocoris whitei is a species of minute pirate bug in the family Anthocoridae. It is found in North America.
