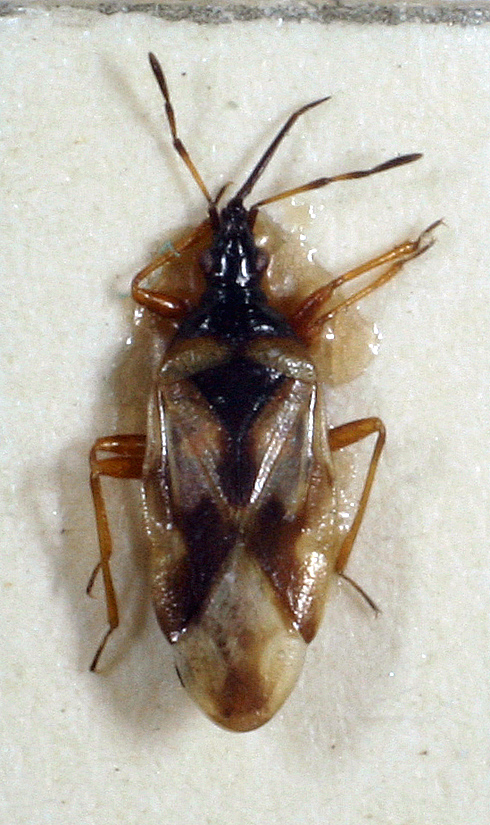

Scientific classification
- Kingdom: Animalia
- Phylum: Arthropoda
- Class: Insecta
- Order: Hemiptera
- Suborder: Heteroptera
- Family: Anthocoridae
- Genus: Anthocoris
- Species: A. limbatus

Binomial name
- Anthocoris limbatus Fieber, 1836

= Anthocoris limbatus =

Species of true bug

Anthocoris limbatus is a Palearctic species of true bug. It is predatory.
