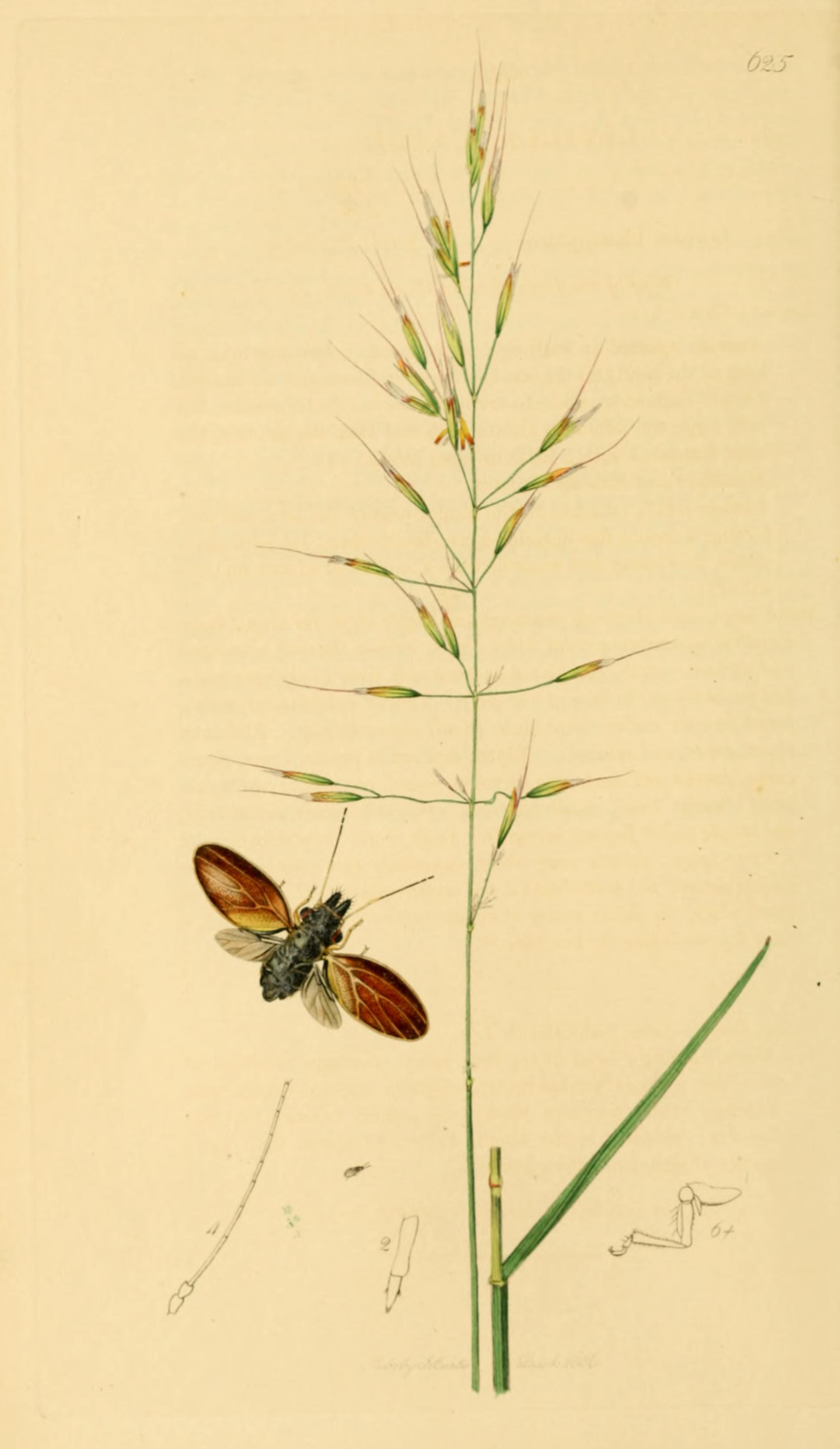
- original illustration of Livilla ulicis

Scientific classification
- Kingdom: Animalia
- Phylum: Arthropoda
- Class: Insecta
- Order: Hemiptera
- Suborder: Sternorrhyncha
- Family: Psyllidae
- Subfamily: Psyllinae
- Genus: Livilla; Curtis, 1836

Synonyms
- Alloeoneura; Floria Löw, 1879; Floriella

= Livilla (bug) =

Genus of true bugs

External image
- Images at iNaturalist

Livilla is a genus of mostly western Palaearctic plant lice belonging to the subfamily Psyllinae; it was erected by John Curtis in 1836.

== Species ==
The Global Biodiversity Information Facility includes:

1. Livilla adusta (Löw, 1881)
2. Livilla baetica Percy, 2002
3. Livilla bimaculata Hodkinson & Hollis, 1987
4. Livilla bivittata Hodkinson & Hollis, 1987
5. Livilla blandula (Horváth, 1905)
6. Livilla burckhardti Hodkinson & Hollis, 1987
7. Livilla caprifuga Percy, 2002
8. Livilla cataloniensis (Hodkinson & White, 1979)
9. Livilla cognata (Löw, 1881)
10. Livilla complexa Percy, 2002
11. Livilla espunae Burckhardt, 1989
12. Livilla genistae Ramirez Gomez, 1956
13. Livilla hodkinsoni (Burckhardt, 1979)
14. Livilla hollisi Rapisarda, 1990
15. Livilla horvathi (Scott, 1879)
16. Livilla ima (Loginova, 1972)
17. Livilla kabylica Burckhardt, 1989
18. Livilla klapperichi Hodkinson & Hollis, 1987
19. Livilla lautereri Hodkinson & Hollis, 1987
20. Livilla lusitanica Hodkinson & Hollis, 1987
21. Livilla maculipennis Hodkinson & Hollis, 1987
22. Livilla magna Hodkinson & Hollis, 1987
23. Livilla maura (Vondráček, 1951)
24. Livilla monospermae Hodkinson, 1990
25. Livilla nervosa Hodkinson & Hollis, 1987
26. Livilla nigralineata Hodkinson & Hollis, 1987
27. Livilla nigripennis Burckhardt, 1989
28. Livilla poggii (Conci & Tamanini, 1984)
29. Livilla pseudoretamae Hodkinson & Hollis, 1987
30. Livilla pyrenaea (Mink, 1859)
31. Livilla radiata (Foerster, 1848)
32. Livilla retamae (Puton, 1878)
33. Livilla siciliensis Hodkinson & Hollis, 1987
34. Livilla smyrnensis Burckhardt, 1989
35. Livilla spartiisuga (Puton, 1876)
36. Livilla spectabilis (Flor, 1861)
37. Livilla syriaca (Löw, 1881)
38. Livilla ulicis Curtis, 1836 – type species
39. Livilla variegata (Löw, 1881)
40. Livilla vicina (Löw, 1886)
41. Livilla vittipennella (Reuter, 1875)
