= Thelaxinae =

Scientific classification
- Domain: Eukaryota
- Kingdom: Animalia
- Phylum: Arthropoda
- Class: Insecta
- Order: Hemiptera
- Suborder: Sternorrhyncha
- Family: Aphididae
- Subfamily: Thelaxinae; Baker, 1920

Genera
- Glyphina; Kurisakia; Neothelaxes; Thelaxes

Subfamily of true bugs

Thelaxinae is a subfamily of the family Aphididae.
