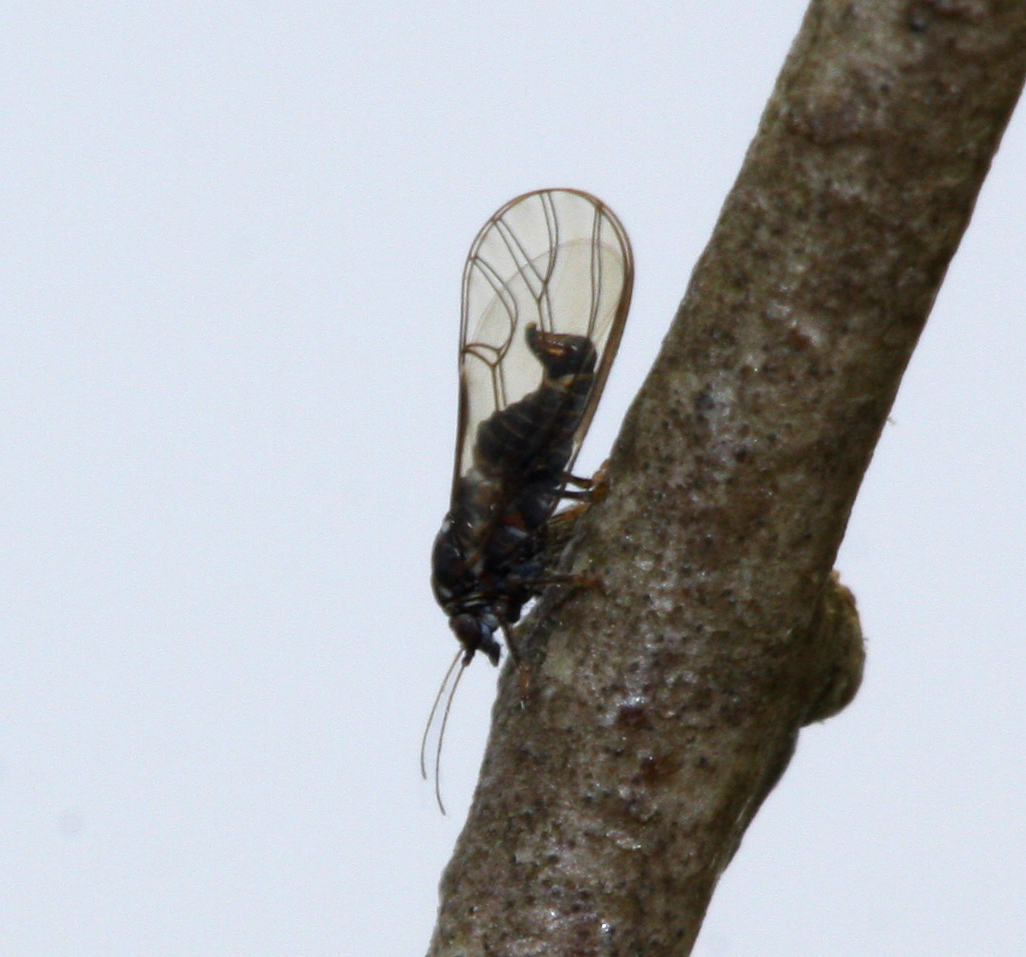
- Male
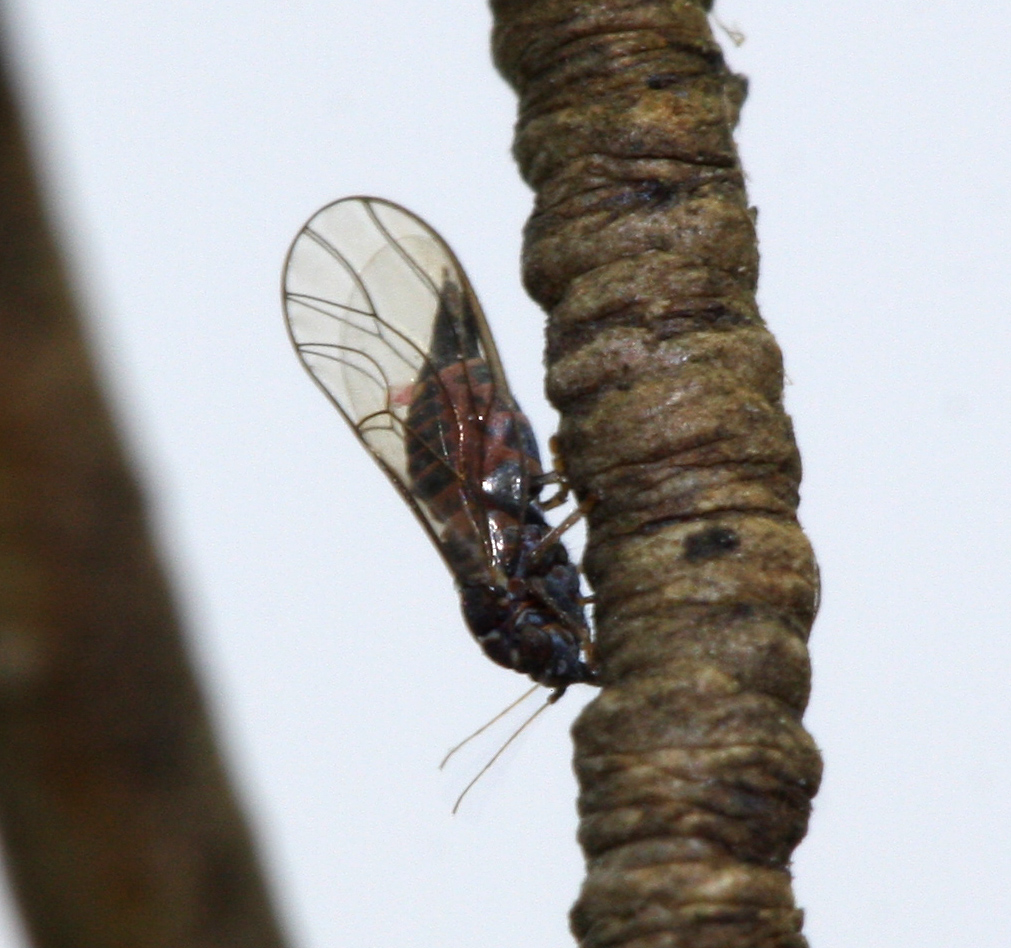
- Female

Scientific classification
- Kingdom: Animalia
- Phylum: Arthropoda
- Class: Insecta
- Order: Hemiptera
- Suborder: Sternorrhyncha
- Family: Psyllidae
- Genus: Cacopsylla
- Species: C. melanoneura

Binomial name
- Cacopsylla melanoneura Foerster, 1848

= Cacopsylla melanoneura =

Species of true bug

Cacopsylla melanoneura is an insect of the Psyllidae family. It mainly feeds on hawthorn. The insect will also feed on apple trees and is considered the main vector of the phytoplasma disease "Ca. Phytoplasma mali" (Apple Proliferation) in northwestern Italy.
