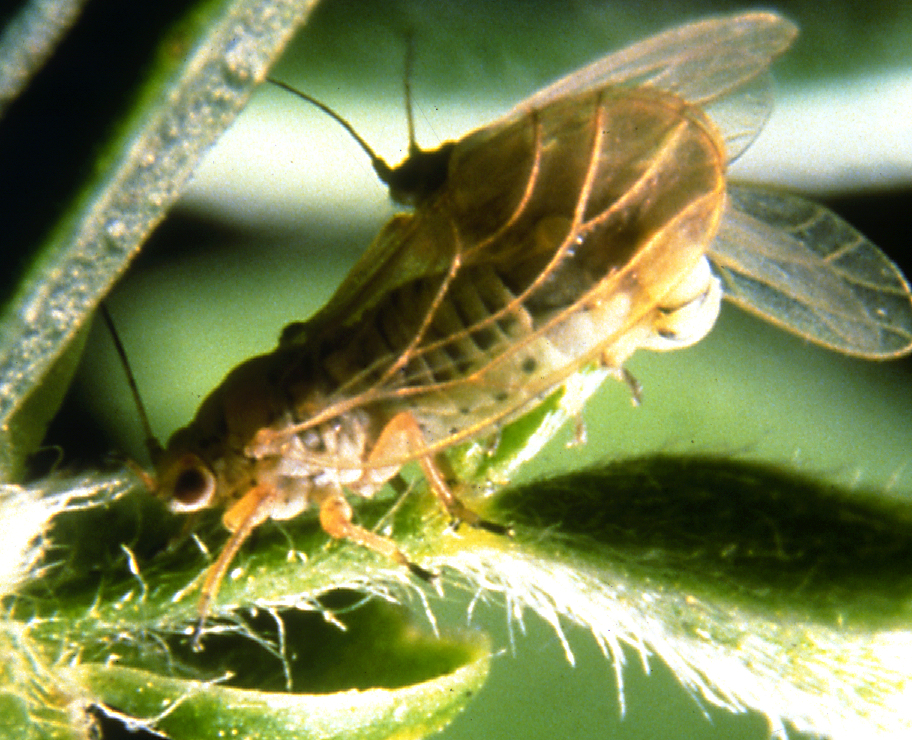
- Arytainilla spartiophila

Scientific classification
- Kingdom: Animalia
- Phylum: Arthropoda
- Class: Insecta
- Order: Hemiptera
- Suborder: Sternorrhyncha
- Family: Psyllidae
- Subfamily: Psyllinae; Latreille, 1807

= Psyllinae =

Subfamily of true bugs

Psyllinae is a subfamily of plant-parasitic hemipterans in the family Psyllidae. It includes minor pest species such as: the apple psylla, Cacopsylla mali and Cacopsylla pyri (a.k.a. Psylla pyri), commonly known as the pear psylla.

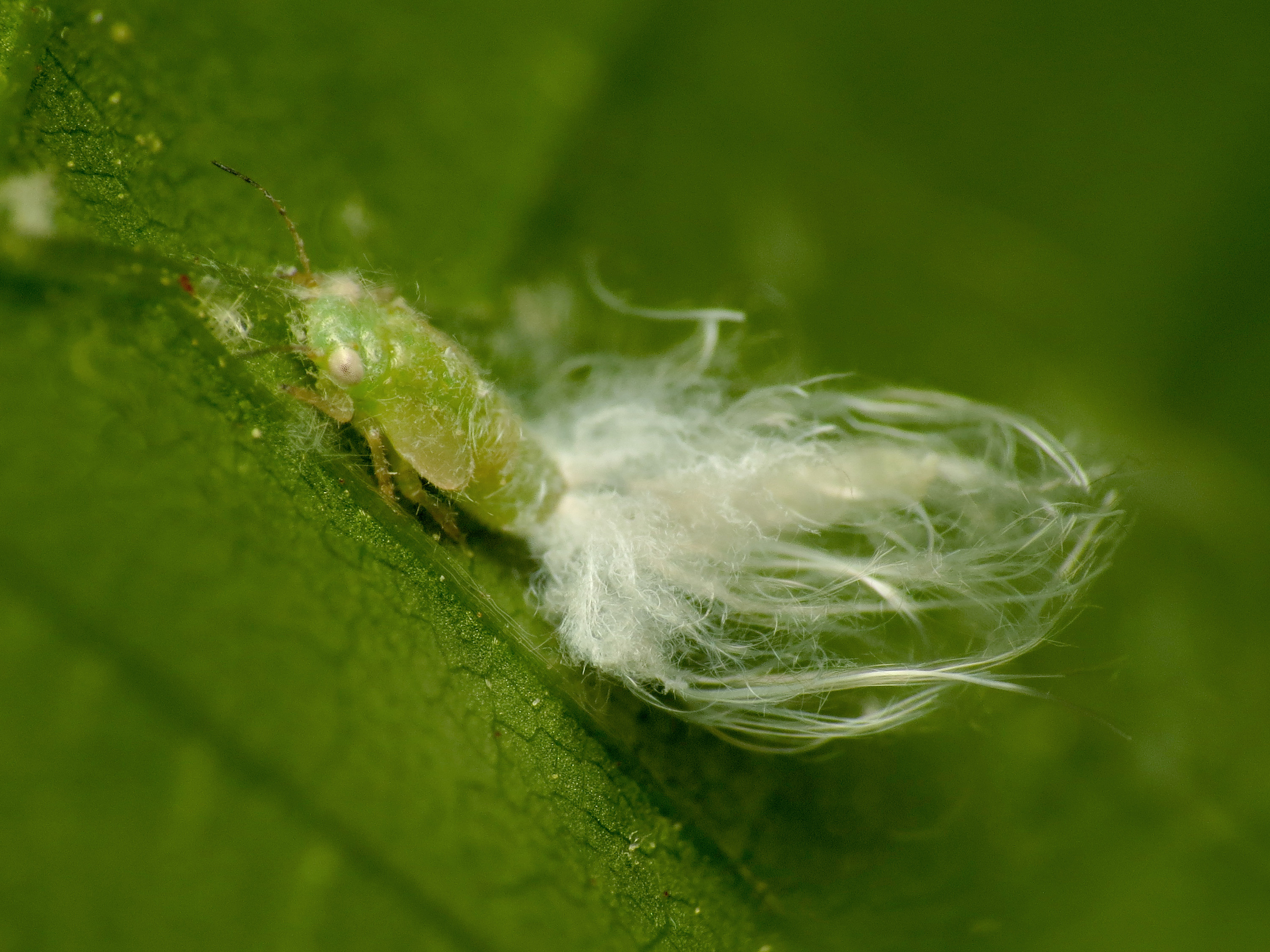
Psylla carpinicola

== Genera ==
These genera belong to the subfamily Psyllinae:

1. Anomoneura Schwarz in Uhler, 1896 - E. Asia
2. Amorphicola Heslop-Harrison, 1961 - N. America ^{c g b}
3. Arytaina Foerster, 1848 - mostly Palaearctic
  (syn. Amblyrhina, Ataenia, Psyllopa)
4. Arytainilla Loginova, 1972 - mostly Palaearctic^{c g b}
5. Cacopsylla Ossiannilsson, 1970 - widespread in northern hemisphere^{c g b}
6. Ceanothia Heslop-Harrison, 1961 - N. America
  (syn. Euglyptoneura Heslop-Harrison, 1961)
7. Cornopsylla Li, 1994 - S.E. Himalayas
8. Cyamophila Loginova, 1976 - S. Europe to E. Asia
9. Cyamophiliopsis Li, 2011
10. Cylindropsylla Li, 2011 - China
11. Gelonopsylla Li, 1992
12. Livilla Curtis, 1836 (syn. Alloeoneura, Floria, Floriella) - mostly Palaearctic
13. Mecistoneura Li, 2011
14. Nyctiphalerus Bliven, 1955 - N. America ^{c g b}
15. Palaeolindbergiella Heslop-Harrison, 1961 - southern Asia
16. Pexopsylla Jensen, 1957 - N. America ^{c g b}
17. Psylla Geoffroy, 1762 (synonyms include Chamaepsylla syn. nov.)
18. Purshivora Heslop-Harrison, 1961 - N. America ^{c g b}
19. Spanioneura Foerster, 1848 - mostly Palaearctic ^{c g b}

Data sources: i = ITIS, c = Catalogue of Life, g = GBIF, b = Bugguide.net
