= Cacopsylla pyricola =

Scientific classification
- Kingdom: Animalia
- Phylum: Arthropoda
- Class: Insecta
- Order: Hemiptera
- Suborder: Sternorrhyncha
- Family: Psyllidae
- Genus: Cacopsylla
- Species: C. pyricola

Binomial name
- Cacopsylla pyricola (Foerster, 1848)

Synonyms
- Psylla pyricola

Species of true bug

Cacopsylla pyricola, commonly known as the pear sucker, is a true bug in the family Psyllidae and is a pest of pear trees (Pyrus). It originated in Europe, was introduced to the United States in the early nineteenth century and spread across the country in the next century.

== Description ==
The eggs are tiny, stalked, oval, and cream to yellow, darkening before they hatch. The first instar nymphs are yellowish or pinkish and flattened, but later instars are greenish to dark brown, with distinctive red eyes and developing wing buds. The edges of the buds bear three to five knobbed bristles. The nymphs are largely immobile and tend to be found on the underside of leaves. In summer the adults are a fairly pale colour but in winter they are reddish-brown to black, the transparent wings being dusky. These psylla rest with their wings folded roof-like over their abdomens.

== Distribution ==
Cacopsylla pyricola is native to Europe but was introduced into the eastern United States with nursery stock in the early 1800s; it had spread to the fruit-growing regions of the Pacific Northwest by the early 1900s. Along with the codling moth (Cydia pomonella), it is considered one of the most important pest of pears in the United States. Host plants are restricted to pear and quince.

== Life cycle ==
Adult C. pyricola overwinter on the bark or twigs of a pear tree, or on other trees and shrubs near pear orchards. In the spring, the female lays eggs on twigs and expanding shoots of host trees, attaching them by means of short stalks on their ventral surfaces. On hatching, the nymphs feed on the buds and flowers of the host tree, inserting their mouthparts and sucking out the sap. Later in the year, the eggs are laid beside the veins on the upper surface of leaves. The nymphs pass through five instars before becoming adult in a few weeks. There may be up to six generations each year and numbers of insects can build up fast. The nymphs produce copious honeydew which attracts ants, flies, bees and other insects.
