= List of Deraeocoris species =

This is a list of 216 species in the genus Deraeocoris.

== Deraeocoris species ==
- Deraeocoris addendus Linnavuori, 1960
- Deraeocoris africanus Poppius, 1914
- Deraeocoris ainoicus Kerzhner, 1979
- Deraeocoris albigulus Knight, 1921
- Deraeocoris alluaudi Poppius, 1912
- Deraeocoris alnicola Knight, 1921
- Deraeocoris alticallus Hsiao, 1941
- Deraeocoris angustiverticalis Ma and Liu, 2002
- Deraeocoris anhwenicus Hsiao, 1941
- Deraeocoris annulifemoralis Ma and Liu, 2002
- Deraeocoris annulipes (Herrich-Schaeffer, 1842)
- Deraeocoris annulus Hsiao and Ren, 1983
- Deraeocoris apache Knight, 1921
- Deraeocoris aphidicidus Ballard, 1927
- Deraeocoris aphidiphagus Knight, 1921
- Deraeocoris apicatus Kerzhner and Schuh, 1995
- Deraeocoris appalachianus Knight, 1921
- Deraeocoris ater (Jakovlev, 1889)
- Deraeocoris aterrimus Poppius, 1915
- Deraeocoris atramentarius Linnavuori, 1975
- Deraeocoris atriventris Knight, 1921
- Deraeocoris australicus Reuter, 1905
- Deraeocoris bakeri Knight, 1921
- Deraeocoris balli Knight, 1927
- Deraeocoris balticus Herczek and Gorczyca, 1991
- Deraeocoris barberi Knight, 1921
- Deraeocoris betulae Knight, 1921
- Deraeocoris biroi Poppius, 1915
- Deraeocoris borealis (Van Duzee, 1920)
- Deraeocoris brachialis Stål, 1858
- Deraeocoris brevicornis Linnavuori, 1961
- Deraeocoris brevis (Uhler, 1904)
- Deraeocoris breviusculus Poppius, 1915
- Deraeocoris brunneirostris Poppius, 1914
- Deraeocoris brunneolus Kerzhner and Schuh, 1995
- Deraeocoris brunnescens Kerzhner and Josifov, 1999
- Deraeocoris brunneus Poppius, 1912
- Deraeocoris bullatus Knight, 1921
- Deraeocoris callosus Poppius, 1912
- Deraeocoris capensis (Distant, 1904)
- Deraeocoris cardinalis (Fieber, 1858)
- Deraeocoris castaneae Josifov, 1983
- Deraeocoris caviscutum Wagner, 1963
- Deraeocoris celebensis Poppius, 1915
- Deraeocoris cerachates Uhler, 1894
- Deraeocoris ceylanus Poppius, 1914
- Deraeocoris claspericapilatus Kulik, 1965
- Deraeocoris cochise Razafimahatratra and Lattin, 1982
- Deraeocoris comanche Knight, 1921
- Deraeocoris conspicuus Ma and Liu, 2002
- Deraeocoris convexulus Knight, 1921
- Deraeocoris cordiger (Hahn, 1834)
- Deraeocoris cribratoides Carvalho, 1957
- Deraeocoris crigi Leston and Gibbs, 1968
- Deraeocoris cupreus Ma and Liu, 2002
- Deraeocoris darjeelingensis Kerzhner and Schuh, 1995
- Deraeocoris davisi Knight, 1921
- Deraeocoris delagrangei (Puton, 1892)
- Deraeocoris delicatus (Distant, 1884)
- Deraeocoris dentifer Linnavuori, 1975
- Deraeocoris discoidalis (Poppius, 1912)
- Deraeocoris dissimilis Ballard, 1927
- Deraeocoris diveni Knight, 1921
- Deraeocoris elegantulus Horvath, 1905
- Deraeocoris elongatus (Poppius, 1915)
- Deraeocoris erythromelas Yasunaga and Nakatani, 1998
- Deraeocoris esau (Distant, 1904)
- Deraeocoris fasciolus Knight, 1921
- Deraeocoris fenestratus (Van Duzee, 1917)
- Deraeocoris finisterrensis Carvalho, 1985
- Deraeocoris flaviceps Ma and Liu, 2002
- Deraeocoris flavidus Poppius, 1915
- Deraeocoris flavilinea (A. Costa, 1862)
- Deraeocoris franserensis Razafimahatratra and Lattin, 1982
- Deraeocoris fraserensis Razafimahatratra and Lattin, 1983
- Deraeocoris fujianensis Ma and Zheng, 1998
- Deraeocoris fulgidus (Van Duzee, 1914)
- Deraeocoris fulvescens (Reuter, 1909)
- Deraeocoris fulvus Knight, 1921
- Deraeocoris fusifrons Knight, 1921
- Deraeocoris gagnei Carvalho, 1985
- Deraeocoris gibbantennatus Yasunaga and Nakatani, 1998
- Deraeocoris gilensis Razafimahatratra and Lattin, 1982
- Deraeocoris gorokensis Carvalho, 1985
- Deraeocoris gracilicornis Poppius, 1911
- Deraeocoris grandis (Uhler, 1887)
- Deraeocoris gressitti Carvalho, 1985
- Deraeocoris grisescens Poppius, 1915
- Deraeocoris guamensis Usinger, 1946
- Deraeocoris guizhouensis Ma and Zheng, 1997
- Deraeocoris hayashii Nakatani, 1996
- Deraeocoris hesperus Knight, 1921
- Deraeocoris hildebrandti Poppius, 1912
- Deraeocoris histricus (Stål, 1855)
- Deraeocoris histrio (Reuter, 1876)
- Deraeocoris horvathi Poppius, 1915
- Deraeocoris howanus Poppius, 1912
- Deraeocoris hyalinus Carvalho and Schaffner, 1973
- Deraeocoris incertus Knight, 1921
- Deraeocoris indianus Carvalho, 1957
- Deraeocoris indicus Poppius, 1915
- Deraeocoris inflaticeps Linnavuori, 1975
- Deraeocoris insularis Ma and Liu, 2002
- Deraeocoris insulicola Poppius, 1915
- Deraeocoris jacobsoni Poppius, 1914
- Deraeocoris josifovi Kerzhner, 1988
- Deraeocoris kaitakiensis Carvalho, 1985
- Deraeocoris kenianus Poppius, 1912
- Deraeocoris kennicotti Knight, 1921
- Deraeocoris kerzhneri Josifov, 1983
- Deraeocoris kimotoi Miyamoto, 1965
- Deraeocoris knightonius Razafimahatratra and Lattin, 1982
- Deraeocoris lamia Linnavuori, 1973
- Deraeocoris langannus Linnavuori, 1975
- Deraeocoris laricicola Knight, 1921
- Deraeocoris limbatus Miller, 1956
- Deraeocoris lucidus Linnavuori, 1975
- Deraeocoris luridipes Knight, 1921
- Deraeocoris lutescens (Schilling, 1837)
- Deraeocoris lutulentus (Distant, 1904)
- Deraeocoris maculatus Ballard, 1927
- Deraeocoris madisonensis Akingbohungbe, 1972
- Deraeocoris majesticus Ma and Liu, 2002
- Deraeocoris malayus Poppius, 1914
- Deraeocoris manitou (Van Duzee, 1920)
- Deraeocoris maoricus Woodward, 1950
- Deraeocoris martini (Puton, 1887)
- Deraeocoris membranalis Carvalho, 1985
- Deraeocoris morio (Boheman, 1852)
- Deraeocoris morobensis Carvalho, 1985
- Deraeocoris morosus Linnavuori, 1975
- Deraeocoris mutatus Knight, 1921
- Deraeocoris navajo Knight, 1921
- Deraeocoris nebulosus (Uhler, 1872)
- Deraeocoris neocaledonicus Poppius, 1915
- Deraeocoris nigrifrons Knight, 1921
- Deraeocoris nigritulus Knight, 1921
- Deraeocoris nigriventris Poppius, 1914
- Deraeocoris nigropectus Hsiao, 1941
- Deraeocoris nigropunctatus Lindberg, 1958
- Deraeocoris nitenatus Knight, 1921
- Deraeocoris nubilus Knight, 1921
- Deraeocoris obscuriventris Poppius, 1912
- Deraeocoris oculatus (Reuter, 1904)
- Deraeocoris olivaceus (Fabricius, 1777)
- Deraeocoris omeiensis Hsiao and Ren, 1983
- Deraeocoris onphoriensis Josifov, 1992
- Deraeocoris oparicus Linnavuori, 1975
- Deraeocoris orientalis (Distant, 1904)
- Deraeocoris ornandus Distant, 1904
- Deraeocoris ornatus Knight, 1921
- Deraeocoris ostentans (Stål, 1855)
- Deraeocoris pallens (Reuter, 1904)
- Deraeocoris pallidicornis Josifov, 1983
- Deraeocoris pallidipennis Reuter, 1905
- Deraeocoris pallidomaculatus Poppius, 1915
- Deraeocoris pallidulus Poppius, 1915
- Deraeocoris piceicola Knight, 1927
- Deraeocoris picipes Knight, 1921
- Deraeocoris pilipes (Reuter, 1879)
- Deraeocoris pilosulus Lindberg, 1940
- Deraeocoris pinicola Knight, 1921
- Deraeocoris planus Xu, Ma, and Liu, 2005
- Deraeocoris plebejus Poppius, 1915
- Deraeocoris poecilus Mcatee, 1919
- Deraeocoris ponapensis Carvalho, 1956
- Deraeocoris pseudokerzhneri Ma and Zheng, 1998
- Deraeocoris punctulatus (Fallén, 1807)
- Deraeocoris punctum (Rambur, 1839)
- Deraeocoris putoni (Montandon, 1885)
- Deraeocoris qinlingensis Qi and Lu, 2006
- Deraeocoris quercicola Knight, 1921
- Deraeocoris ribauti Wagner, 1943
- Deraeocoris ruber (Linnaeus, 1758) (red-spotted plant bug)
- Deraeocoris rubiceps Nakatani, 1996
- Deraeocoris rubripes Kelton, 1980
- Deraeocoris rubroclarus Knight, 1921
- Deraeocoris rufiventris Knight, 1921
- Deraeocoris rufus Distant, 1904
- Deraeocoris rutilus (Herrich-Schaeffer, 1838)
- Deraeocoris ryukyuensis Nakatani, 1996
- Deraeocoris sacratus Kirkaldy, 1902
- Deraeocoris salicis Josifov, 1983
- Deraeocoris sanghonami Lee and Kerzhner, 1995
- Deraeocoris sauteri Poppius, 1915
- Deraeocoris sayi (Reuter, 1876)
- Deraeocoris schach (Fabricius, 1781)
- Deraeocoris schuhi Razafimahatratra and Lattin, 1982
- Deraeocoris schwarzii (Uhler, 1893)
- Deraeocoris scutellaris (Fabricius, 1794)
- Deraeocoris scutellarisanus Carvalho, 1957
- Deraeocoris serenus (Douglas and Scott, 1868)
- Deraeocoris sexvittatus Poppius, 1912
- Deraeocoris seychellensis Distant, 1913
- Deraeocoris shastan Knight, 1921
- Deraeocoris signatus (Distant, 1904)
- Deraeocoris signoreti Poppius, 1914
- Deraeocoris similis (Distant, 1904)
- Deraeocoris sordidus Poppius, 1915
- Deraeocoris subtilis Poppius, 1912
- Deraeocoris tibialis (Reuter, 1903)
- Deraeocoris tinctus Knight, 1921
- Deraeocoris triannulipes Knight, 1921
- Deraeocoris trifasciatus (Linnaeus, 1767)
- Deraeocoris trukensis Carvalho, 1956
- Deraeocoris tsugae Bliven, 1956
- Deraeocoris ulmi Josifov, 1983
- Deraeocoris uniformis (Distant, 1904)
- Deraeocoris validus (Reuter, 1909)
- Deraeocoris vanduzeei Knight, 1921
- Deraeocoris ventralis Reuter, 1904
- Deraeocoris wangi Ma and Liu, 2002
- Deraeocoris wauensis Carvalho, 1985
- Deraeocoris yasunagai Nakatani, 1995
- Deraeocoris zarudnyi Kiritshenko, 1952
- Deraeocoris zoui Ma and Zheng, 1997
