= Deraeocoris poecilus =

Scientific classification
- Domain: Eukaryota
- Kingdom: Animalia
- Phylum: Arthropoda
- Class: Insecta
- Order: Hemiptera
- Suborder: Heteroptera
- Family: Miridae
- Tribe: Deraeocorini
- Genus: Deraeocoris
- Species: D. poecilus

Binomial name
- Deraeocoris poecilus Mcatee, 1919

Species of true bug

Deraeocoris poecilus is a species of plant bug in the family Miridae. It is found in North America.
