= Eurychilopterella pacifica =

Scientific classification
- Domain: Eukaryota
- Kingdom: Animalia
- Phylum: Arthropoda
- Class: Insecta
- Order: Hemiptera
- Suborder: Heteroptera
- Family: Miridae
- Tribe: Deraeocorini
- Genus: Eurychilopterella
- Species: E. pacifica

Binomial name
- Eurychilopterella pacifica Stonedahl in Stonedahl, Lattin & Razafimahatratra, 1997

Species of true bug

Eurychilopterella pacifica is a species of plant bug in the family Miridae. It is found in North America.
