= Deraeocoris histrio =

Scientific classification
- Domain: Eukaryota
- Kingdom: Animalia
- Phylum: Arthropoda
- Class: Insecta
- Order: Hemiptera
- Suborder: Heteroptera
- Family: Miridae
- Tribe: Deraeocorini
- Genus: Deraeocoris
- Species: D. histrio

Binomial name
- Deraeocoris histrio (Reuter, 1876)

Species of true bug

Deraeocoris histrio is a species of plant bug in the family Miridae. It is found in North America.
