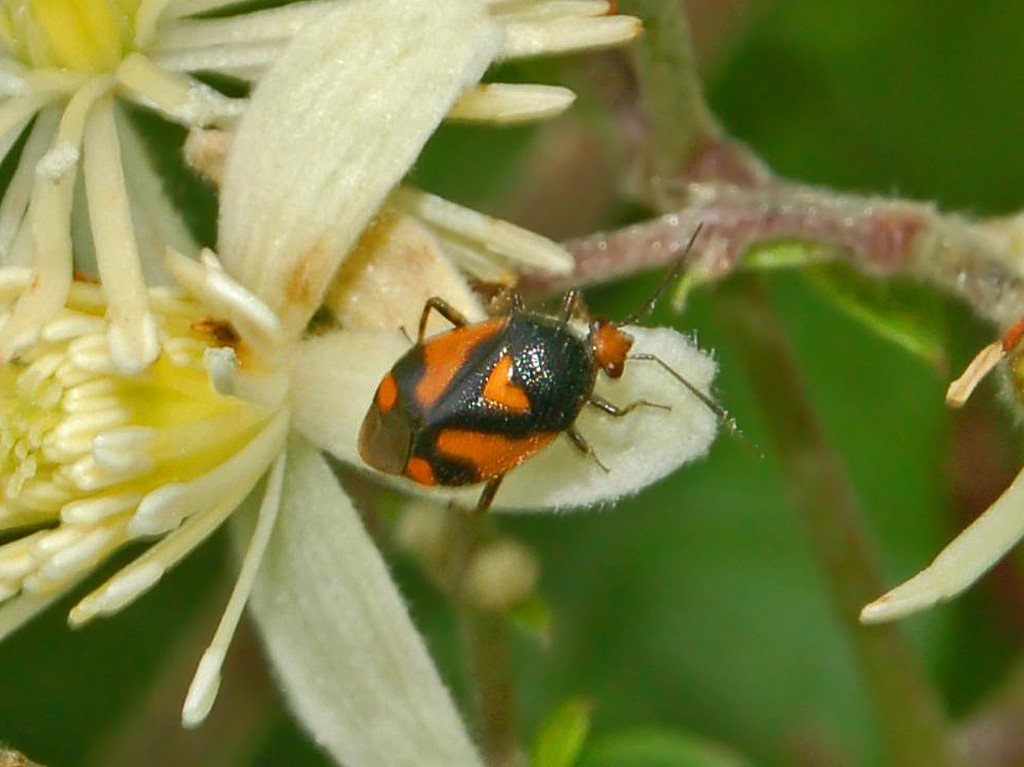
- Deraeocoris schach, upperside

Scientific classification
- Kingdom: Animalia
- Phylum: Arthropoda
- Class: Insecta
- Order: Hemiptera
- Suborder: Heteroptera
- Family: Miridae
- Genus: Deraeocoris
- Species: D. schach

Binomial name
- Deraeocoris schach (Fabricius, 1781)

= Deraeocoris schach =

Species of true bug

Deraeocoris schach is a species of plant bugs belonging to the family Miridae, subfamily Deraeocorinae.

== Distribution ==
This species is mainly found in Southern Europe (Albania, Bosnia and Herzegovina, Bulgaria, Croatia, European Turkey, Slovenia, France, Italy, Greece, Portugal, Spain and Yugoslavia). It is also present in Turkey, Israel and Algeria.

== Description ==
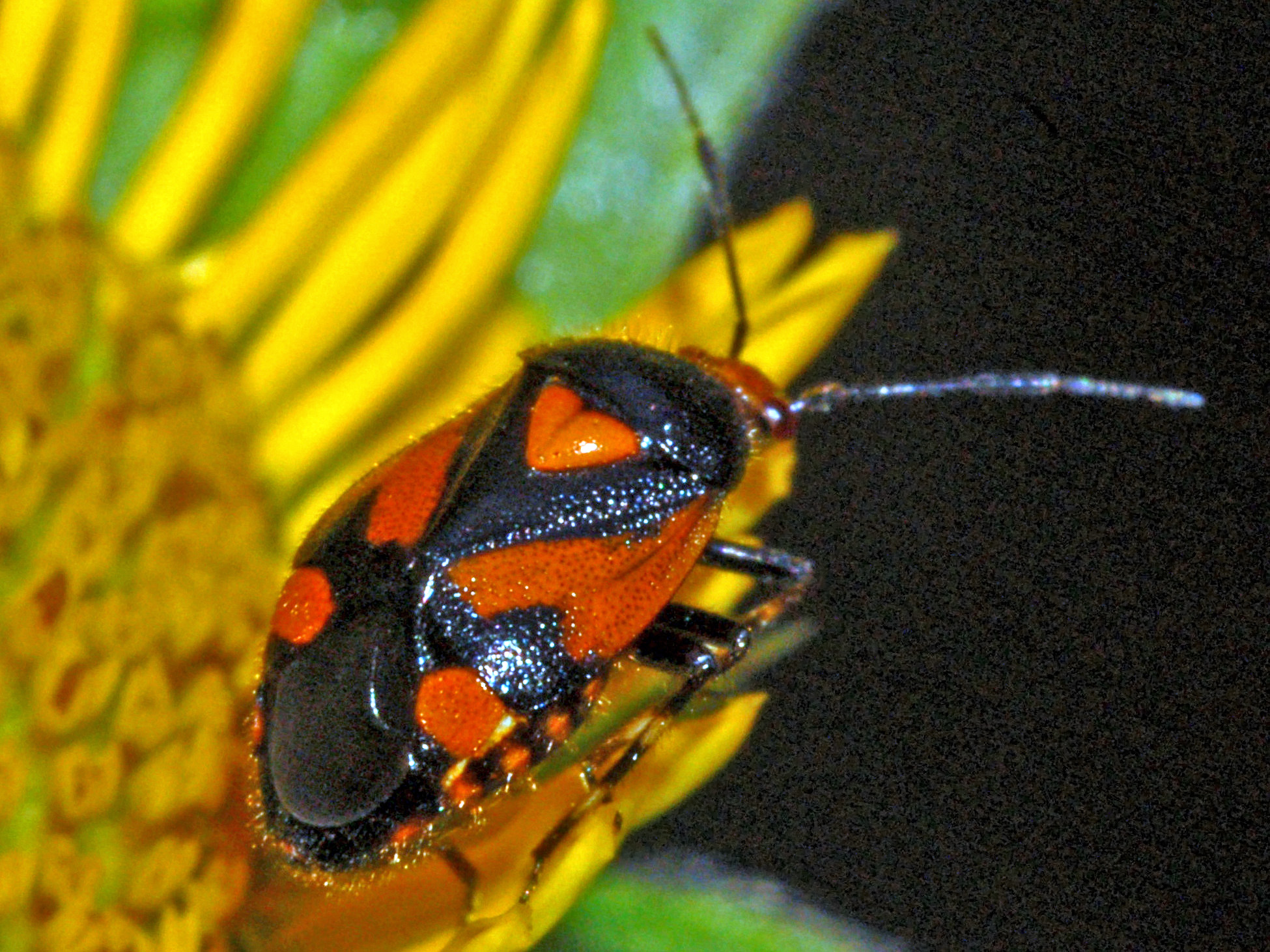
Deraeocoris schach

Deraeocoris schach can reach a length of 6–7 millimetres (0.24–0.28 in). Body is oval shaped and covered with gray hair. The head is orange, rarely black. The first two antennal segments are somewhat thickened and dark, while the two outer segments are thin and light colored. Pronotum is black, with an orange scutellum. The hemielytra are yellow-orange with black, large markings. The legs are black and may have orange or light spots. However, there are several color variants.

== Biology ==
Adults can be found in June and July. These bugs are predators. They mainly feed on aphids and other small insects. They are also predators on the post-hibernation caterpillars of the marsh fritillary (Euphydryas aurinia). These bugs are present on various plants, mainly on Clematis, Echium, Spartium, Juniperus and Quercus species. The species overwinters as eggs.
