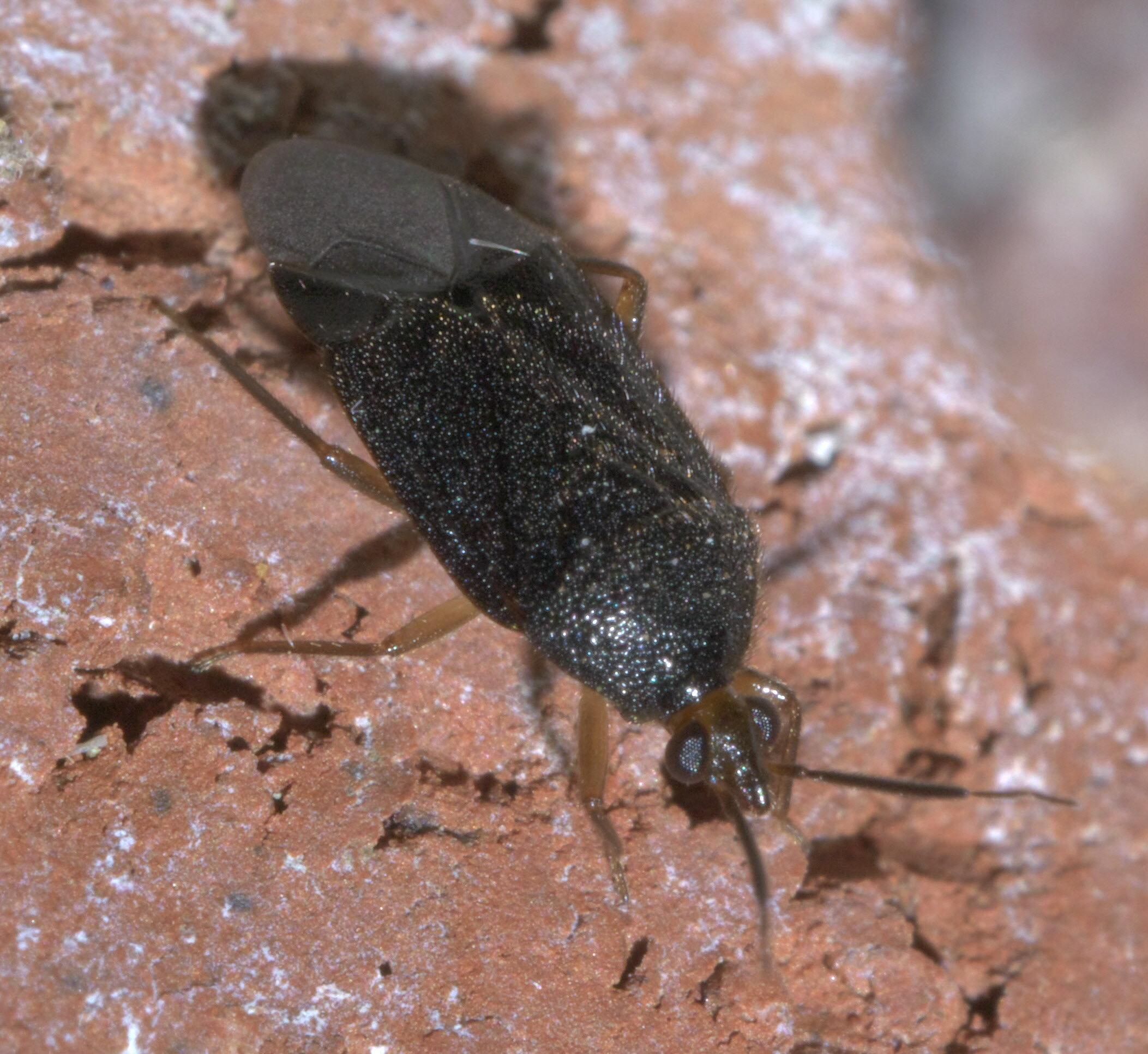

Scientific classification
- Domain: Eukaryota
- Kingdom: Animalia
- Phylum: Arthropoda
- Class: Insecta
- Order: Hemiptera
- Suborder: Heteroptera
- Family: Miridae
- Tribe: Deraeocorini
- Genus: Eurychilopterella
- Species: E. brunneata

Binomial name
- Eurychilopterella brunneata Knight, 1927

= Eurychilopterella brunneata =

Species of true bug

Eurychilopterella brunneata is a species of plant bug in the family Miridae. It is found in North America.
