= Deraeocoris nubilus =

Scientific classification
- Domain: Eukaryota
- Kingdom: Animalia
- Phylum: Arthropoda
- Class: Insecta
- Order: Hemiptera
- Suborder: Heteroptera
- Family: Miridae
- Genus: Deraeocoris
- Species: D. nubilus

Binomial name
- Deraeocoris nubilus Knight, 1921

Species of true bug

Deraeocoris nubilus is a species of plant bug in the family Miridae. It is found in North America.

== Subspecies ==
These two subspecies belong to the species Deraeocoris nubilus.

- Deraeocoris nubilus nubilus Knight, 1921
- Deraeocoris nubilus obscuripes Knight, 1921
