= Eustictus grossus =

Scientific classification
- Domain: Eukaryota
- Kingdom: Animalia
- Phylum: Arthropoda
- Class: Insecta
- Order: Hemiptera
- Suborder: Heteroptera
- Family: Miridae
- Genus: Eustictus
- Species: E. grossus

Binomial name
- Eustictus grossus (Uhler, 1887)

Synonyms
- Megacoelum grossum Uhler, 1887

Species of true bug

Eustictus grossus is a species of plant bug in the family Miridae. It is found in North America.
