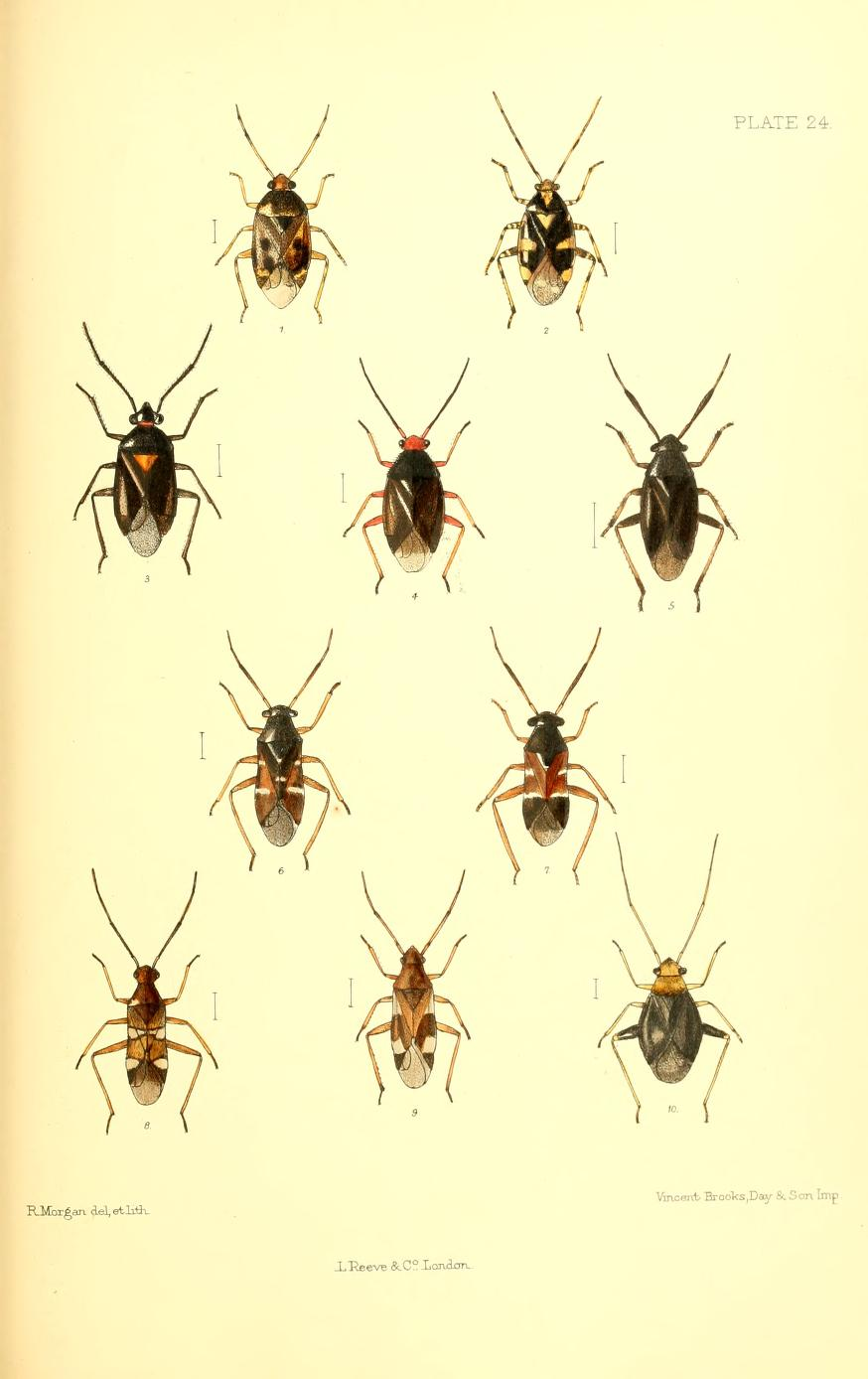
- Deraeocoris scutellaris depicted in Edward Saunders figure 3

Scientific classification
- Kingdom: Animalia
- Phylum: Arthropoda
- Clade: Pancrustacea
- Class: Insecta
- Order: Hemiptera
- Suborder: Heteroptera
- Family: Miridae
- Genus: Deraeocoris
- Species: D. scutellaris

Binomial name
- Deraeocoris scutellaris (Fabricius 1794)

= Deraeocoris scutellaris =

Species of true bug

Deraeocoris scutellaris is a Palearctic species of true bug.
