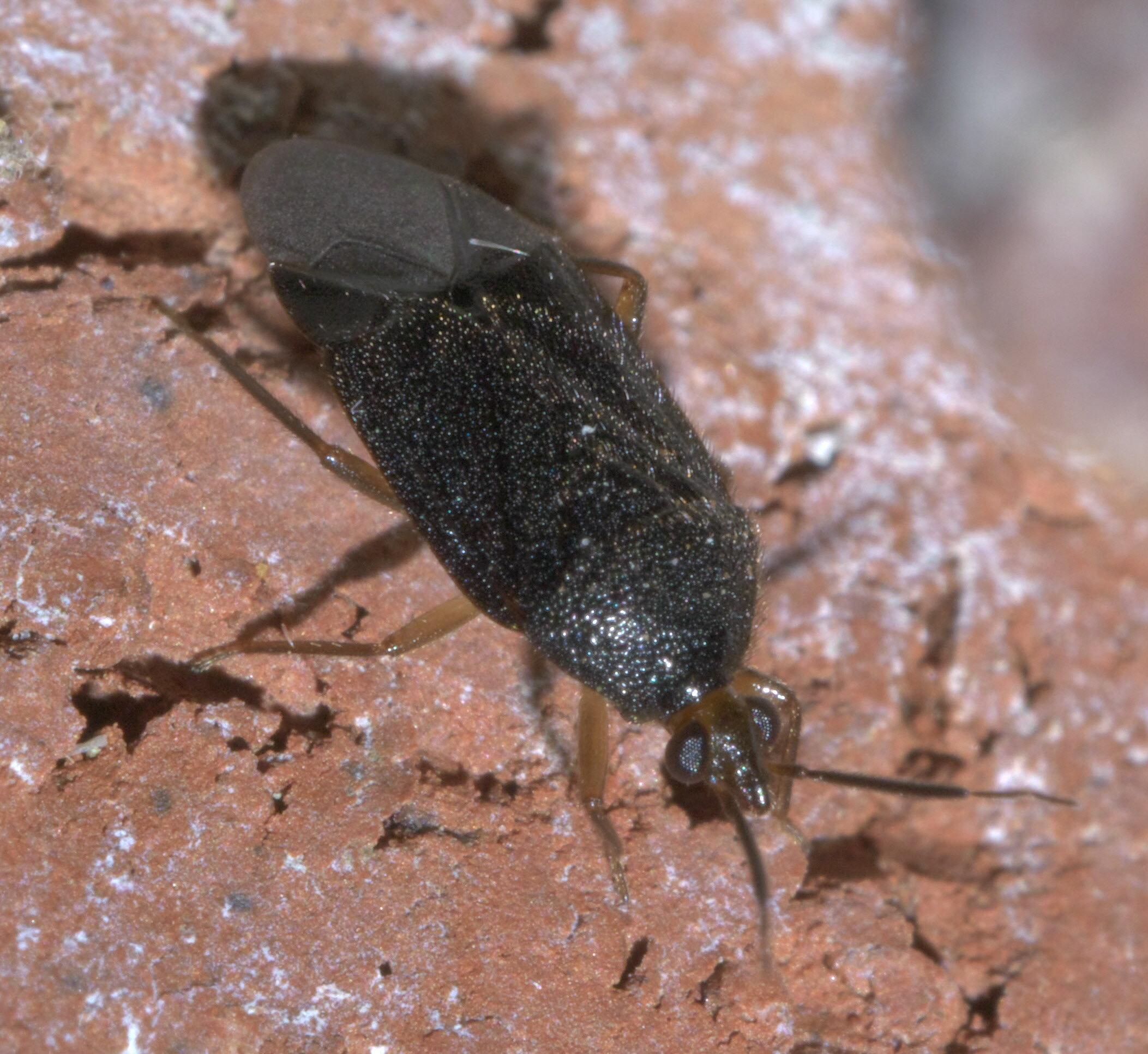
- Eurychilopterella brunneata

Scientific classification
- Kingdom: Animalia
- Phylum: Arthropoda
- Clade: Pancrustacea
- Class: Insecta
- Order: Hemiptera
- Suborder: Heteroptera
- Family: Miridae
- Subfamily: Deraeocorinae
- Tribe: Deraeocorini
- Genus: Eurychilopterella; Reuter, 1909

= Eurychilopterella =

Genus of true bugs

Eurychilopterella is a genus of plant bugs in the family Miridae. There are about nine described species in Eurychilopterella.

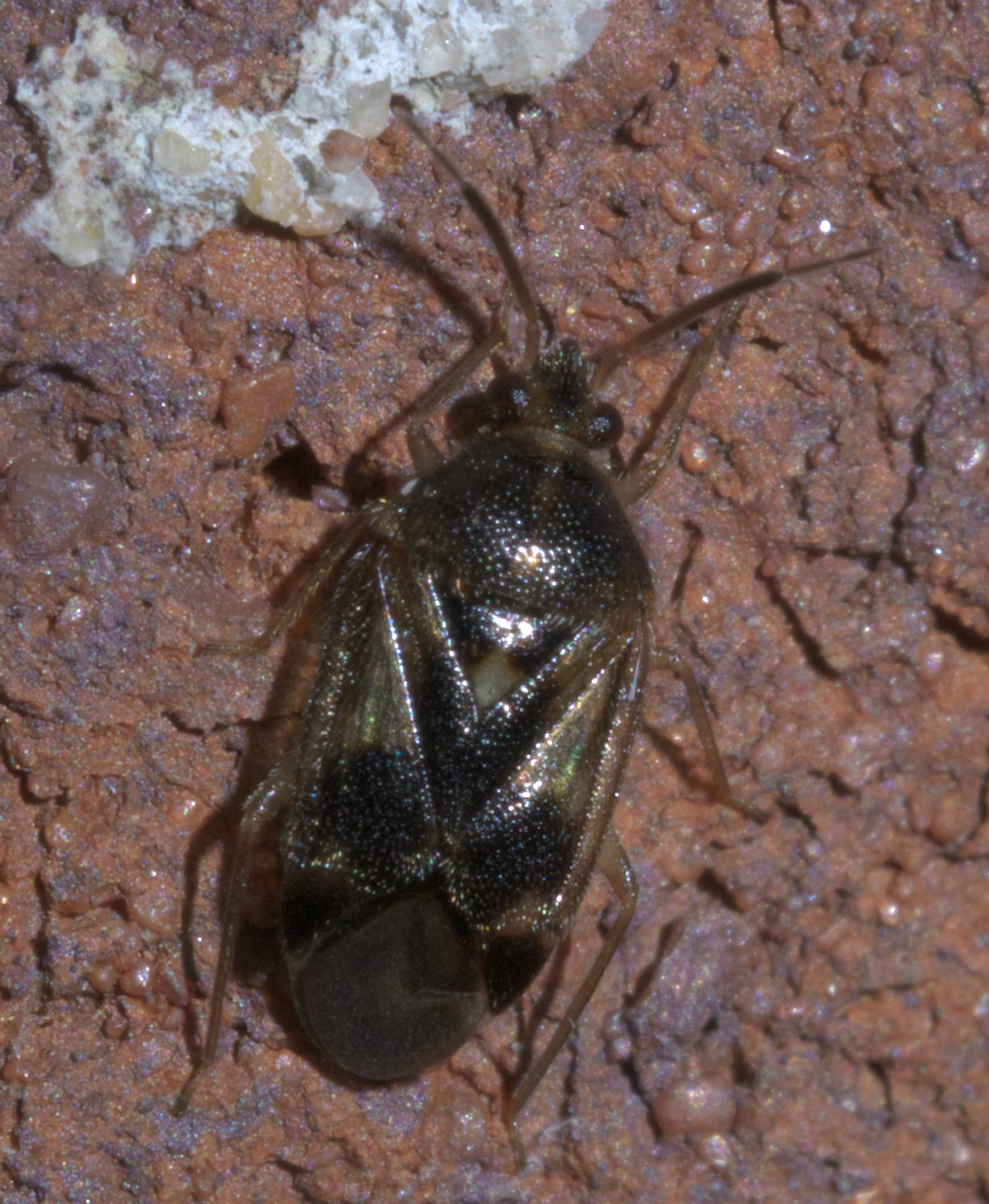
Eurychilopterella luridula

== Species ==
These nine species belong to the genus Eurychilopterella:

- Eurychilopterella barberi Knight, 1927
- Eurychilopterella brunneata Knight, 1927
- Eurychilopterella chiapas Stonedahl in Stonedahl, Lattin & Razafimahatratra, 1997
- Eurychilopterella jalisco Stonedahl in Stonedahl, Lattin & Razafimahatratra, 1997
- Eurychilopterella keltoni Stonedahl in Stonedahl, Lattin & Razafimahatratra, 1997
- Eurychilopterella luridula Reuter, 1909
- Eurychilopterella pacifica Stonedahl in Stonedahl, Lattin & Razafimahatratra, 1997
- Eurychilopterella polhemusi Stonedahl in Stonedahl, Lattin & Razafimahatratra, 1997
- Eurychilopterella tlaxacala Stonedahl in Stonedahl, Lattin & Razafimahatratra, 1997
