= Eustictus spinipes =

Scientific classification
- Domain: Eukaryota
- Kingdom: Animalia
- Phylum: Arthropoda
- Class: Insecta
- Order: Hemiptera
- Suborder: Heteroptera
- Family: Miridae
- Genus: Eustictus
- Species: E. spinipes

Binomial name
- Eustictus spinipes Knight, 1926

Species of true bug

Eustictus spinipes is a species of plant bug in the family Miridae. It is found in North America.
