= Deraeocoris nigritulus =

Scientific classification
- Domain: Eukaryota
- Kingdom: Animalia
- Phylum: Arthropoda
- Class: Insecta
- Order: Hemiptera
- Suborder: Heteroptera
- Family: Miridae
- Genus: Deraeocoris
- Species: D. nigritulus

Binomial name
- Deraeocoris nigritulus Knight, 1921

Species of true bug

Deraeocoris nigritulus is a species of plant bugs in the family Miridae. It is found in North America.
