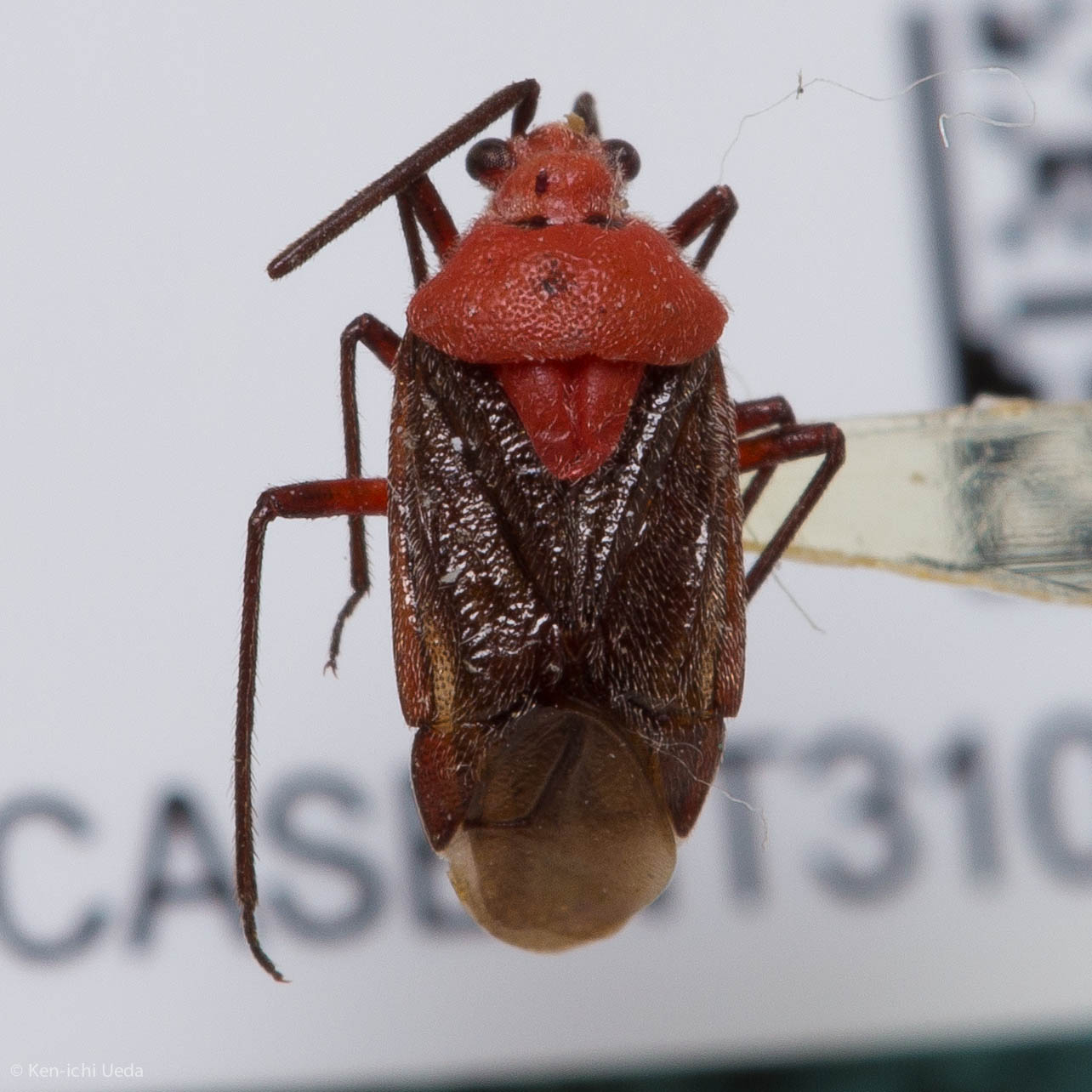
- Clivinema regale

Scientific classification
- Kingdom: Animalia
- Phylum: Arthropoda
- Clade: Pancrustacea
- Class: Insecta
- Order: Hemiptera
- Suborder: Heteroptera
- Family: Miridae
- Subfamily: Deraeocorinae; Douglas & Scott, 1865

Tribes
- Clivinematini Reuter, 1876; Deraeocorini Douglas & Scott, 1865; Hyaliodini Carvalho & Drake, 1943; Saturniomirini Carvalho, 1952; Surinamellini Carvalho & Rosas 1962; Termatophylini Reuter, 1884

= Deraeocorinae =

Subfamily of true bugs

Deraeocorinae is a subfamily of plant bugs in the family Miridae. There are more than 40 genera and around 500 described species in Deraeocorinae.

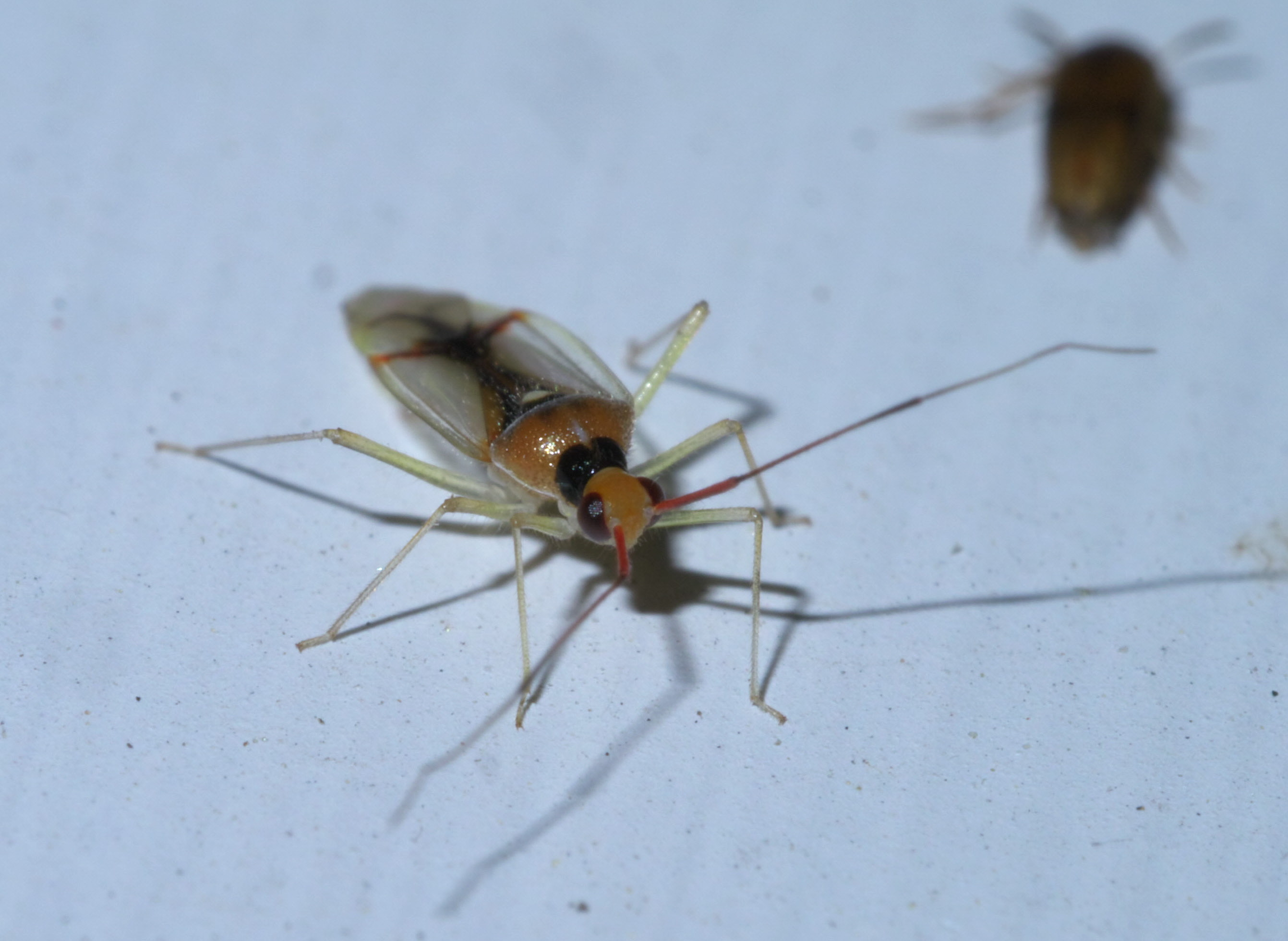
Hyaliodes harti

== Genera ==
These 41 genera belong to the subfamily Deraeocorinae:

- Acutifromiris Hernandez & Stonedahl, 1999
- Agastictus Bergroth, 1922
- Alloeotomus Fieber, 1858
- Ambracius Stal, 1860
- Apoderaeocoris Nakatani, Yasunaga et Takai, 2007
- Bothynotus Fieber, 1864
- Cephalomiroides Hernandez & Stonedahl, 1999
- Cimicicapsus Poppius, 1915
- Cimidaeorus Hsiao & Ren, 1983
- Clivinema Reuter, 1876
- Conocephalocoris Knight, 1927
- Democoris Cassis, 1995
- Deraeocapsus Knight, 1921
- Deraeocoris Kirschbaum, 1856
- Diplozona Van Duzee, 1915
- Dominicanocoris Ferreira, 1996
- Eurybrochis Kirkaldy, 1902
- Eurychilopterella Reuter, 1909
- Eustictus Reuter, 1909
- Fennahiella Carvalho, 1955
- Fingulus Distant, 1904
- Hesperophylum Reuter & Poppius, 1912
- Hyaliodes Reuter, 1876
- Idiomiris China, 1963
- Imogen Kirkaldy, 1905
- Kalamemiris Hosseini & Cassis, 2017
- Klopicoris Van Duzee, 1915
- Kundakimuka Cassis, 1995
- Largidea Van Duzee, 1912
- Paracarniella Henry & Ferreira, 2003
- Paracarnus Distant, 1884
- Philicoris Menard & Siler, 2018
- Platycapsus Reuter, 1904
- Pseudocamptobrochis Poppius, 1911
- Romna Kirkaldy, 1906
- Scutellograndis Hernandez & Stonedahl, 1999
- Stethoconus Flor, 1861tribus Saturniomirini Carvalho, 1952
- Strobilocapsus Bliven, 1956
- Synthlipsis Kirkaldy, 1908
- Termatomiris Ghauri, 1975
- Termatophylum Reuter, 1884
- Trilaccus Horvath, 1902
