= Eustictus necopinus =

Scientific classification
- Domain: Eukaryota
- Kingdom: Animalia
- Phylum: Arthropoda
- Class: Insecta
- Order: Hemiptera
- Suborder: Heteroptera
- Family: Miridae
- Genus: Eustictus
- Species: E. necopinus

Binomial name
- Eustictus necopinus Knight, 1923

Species of true bug

Eustictus necopinus is a species of plant bug in the family Miridae. It is found in North America.

== Subspecies ==
These two subspecies belong to the species Eustictus necopinus:

- Eustictus necopinus discretus Knight, 1923
- Eustictus necopinus necopinus Knight, 1923
