= Eustictus mundus =

Scientific classification
- Domain: Eukaryota
- Kingdom: Animalia
- Phylum: Arthropoda
- Class: Insecta
- Order: Hemiptera
- Suborder: Heteroptera
- Family: Miridae
- Genus: Eustictus
- Species: E. mundus

Binomial name
- Eustictus mundus (Uhler, 1887)

Species of true bug

Eustictus mundus is a species of plant bug in the family Miridae. It is found in North America.
