= Eustictus venatorius =

Scientific classification
- Domain: Eukaryota
- Kingdom: Animalia
- Phylum: Arthropoda
- Class: Insecta
- Order: Hemiptera
- Suborder: Heteroptera
- Family: Miridae
- Genus: Eustictus
- Species: E. venatorius

Binomial name
- Eustictus venatorius Van Duzee, 1912

Species of true bug

Eustictus venatorius is a species of plant bug in the family Miridae. It is found in North America.
