= Alloeotomus =

Scientific classification
- Domain: Eukaryota
- Kingdom: Animalia
- Phylum: Arthropoda
- Class: Insecta
- Order: Hemiptera
- Suborder: Heteroptera
- Family: Miridae
- Subfamily: Deraeocorinae
- Tribe: Deraeocorini
- Genus: Alloeotomus; Fieber, 1858

Genus of true bugs

Alloeotomus is a genus of plant bugs belonging to the family Miridae.

The genus was described in 1858 by Franz Xaver Fieber.

The species of this genus are found in Eurasia.

Species:

- Alloeotomus germanicus
- Alloeotomus gothicus
