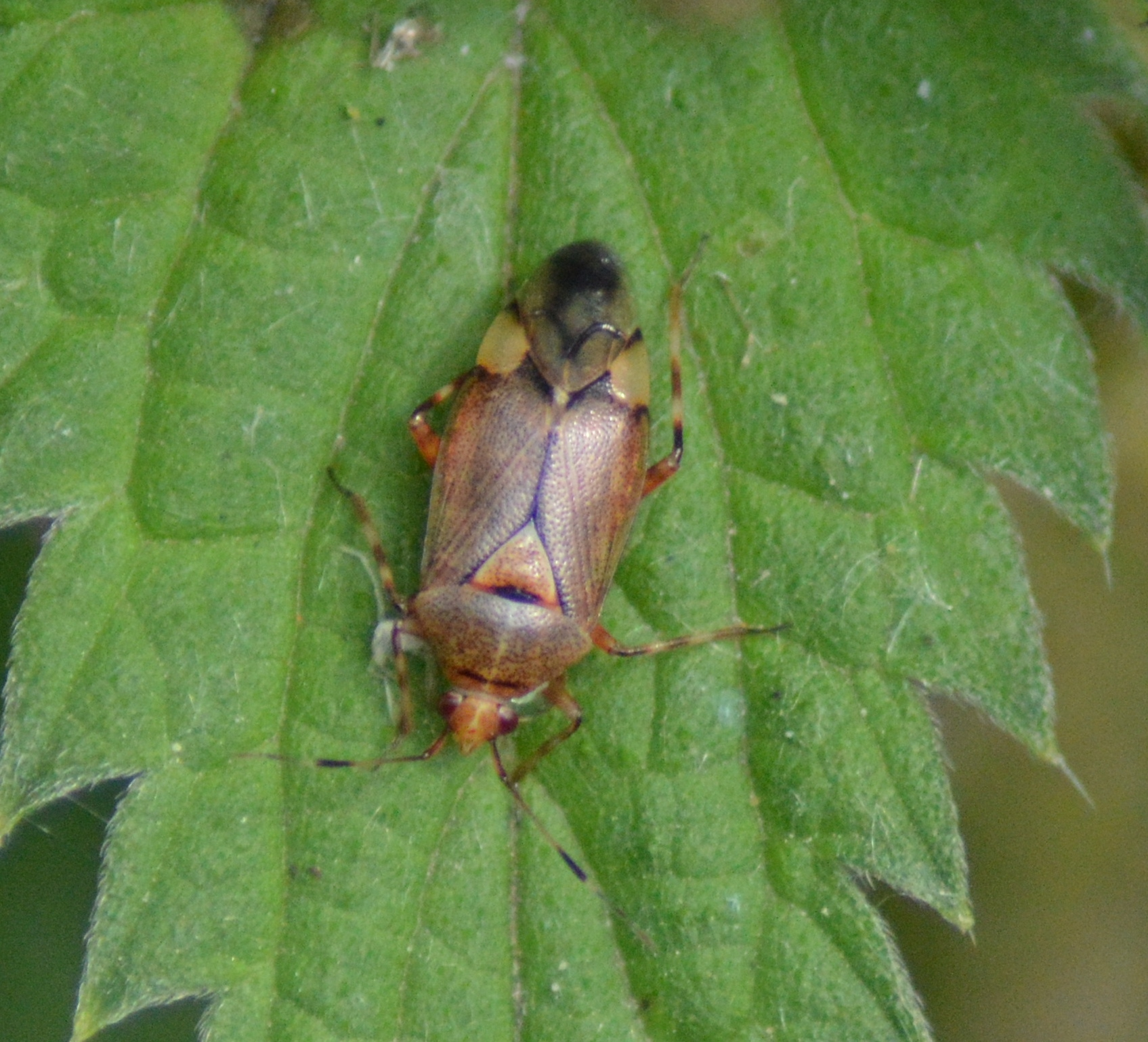
- Deraeocoris flavilinea, female

Scientific classification
- Domain: Eukaryota
- Kingdom: Animalia
- Phylum: Arthropoda
- Class: Insecta
- Order: Hemiptera
- Suborder: Heteroptera
- Family: Miridae
- Genus: Deraeocoris
- Species: D. flavilinea

Binomial name
- Deraeocoris flavilinea (Costa, 1862)

= Deraeocoris flavilinea =

Species of true bug

Deraeocoris flavilinea is a species of plant bug in the family Miridae.

== Description ==
Deraeocoris flavilinea measures 7–8 mm in length. They are sexually dimorphic: males are much darker than the more orange females, and the front and rear margins of the pronotum are narrowly pale. The cuneus is variable and the sides of the scutellum paler in both sexes.

== Distribution ==
Deraeocoris flavilinea is present in Austria, Belgium, United Kingdom, Czech Republic, France, Germany, Italy, Luxembourg, Malta, and Slovenia. It was first recorded in the UK in 1996.
