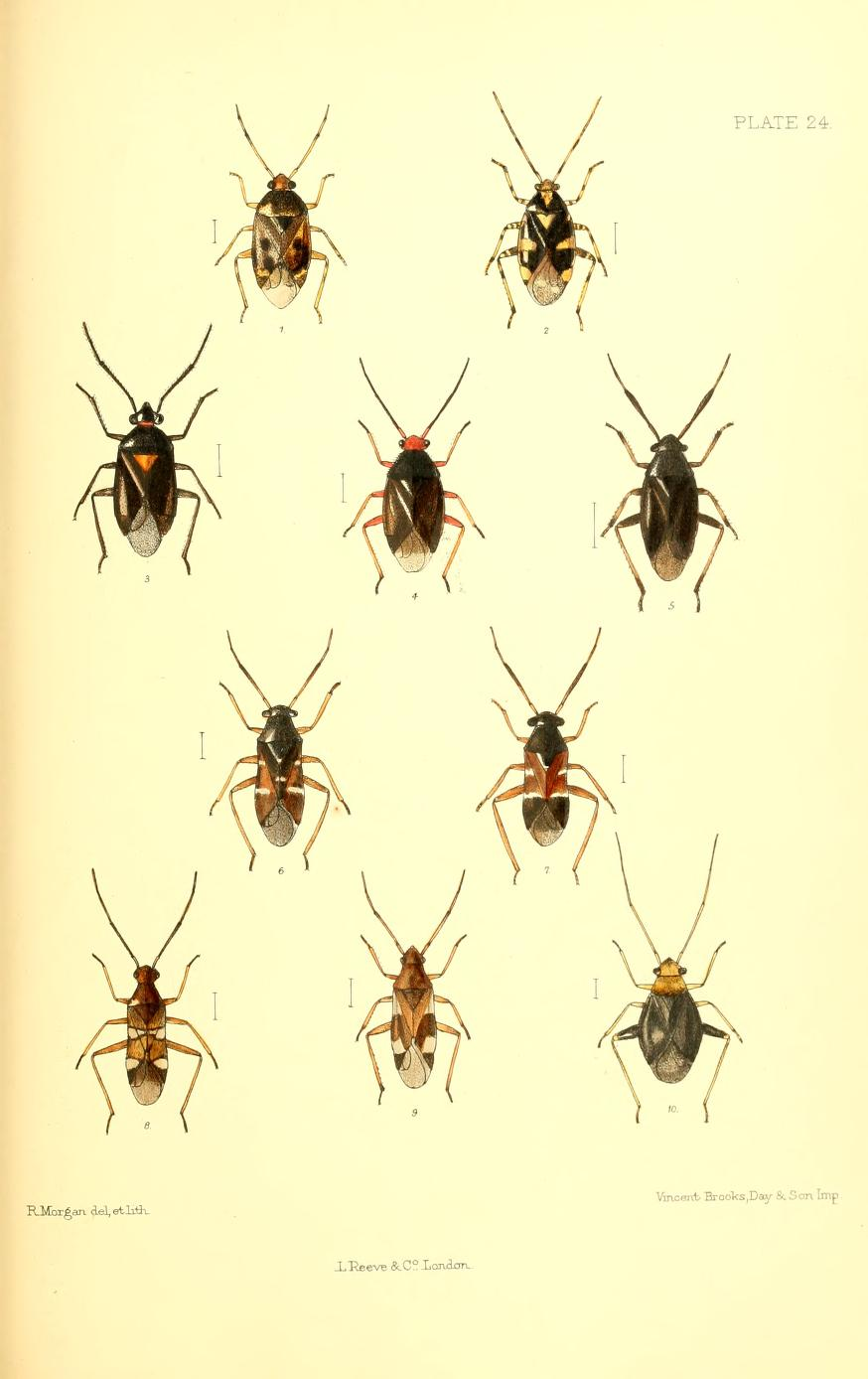
- Illustration (4, center) from Edward Saunders Hemiptera Heteroptera of the British Islands

Scientific classification
- Kingdom: Animalia
- Phylum: Arthropoda
- Clade: Pancrustacea
- Class: Insecta
- Order: Hemiptera
- Suborder: Heteroptera
- Family: Miridae
- Genus: Bothynotus
- Species: B. pilosus

Binomial name
- Bothynotus pilosus (Boheman 1852)

= Bothynotus pilosus =

Species of true bug

Bothynotus pilosus is a Palearctic species of true bug.
