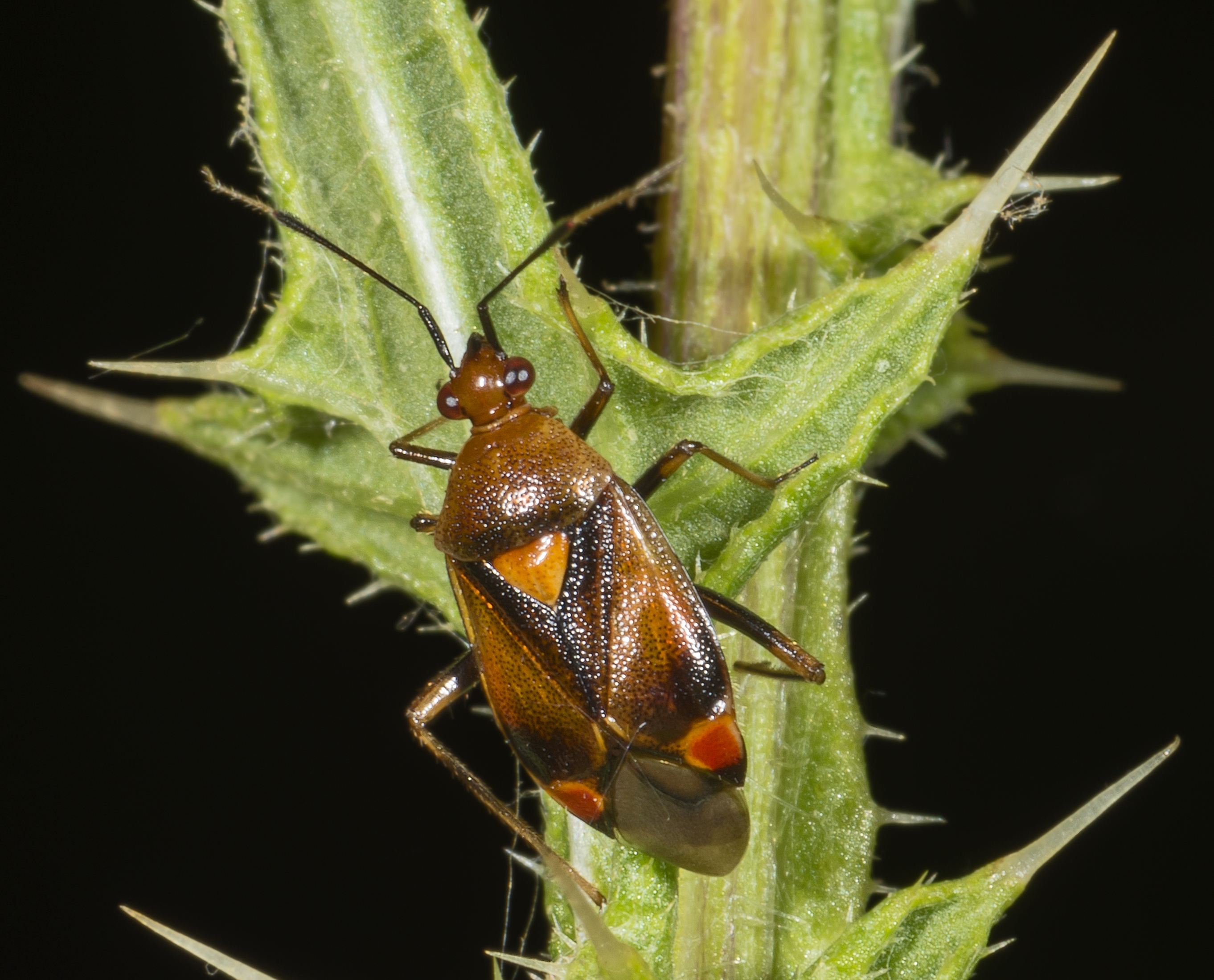
- Deraeocoris ruber, upperside
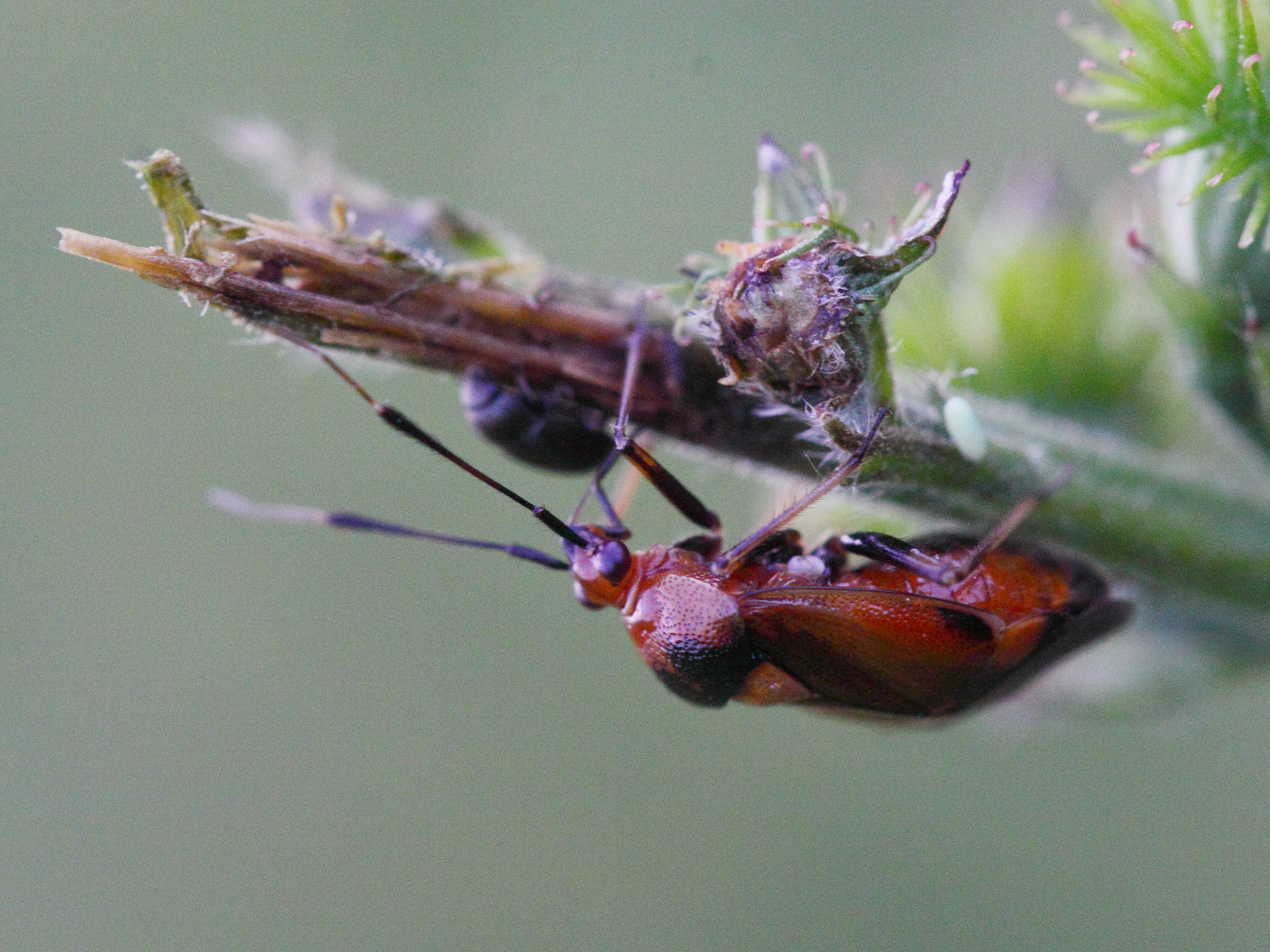
- Side view

Scientific classification
- Kingdom: Animalia
- Phylum: Arthropoda
- Clade: Pancrustacea
- Class: Insecta
- Order: Hemiptera
- Suborder: Heteroptera
- Family: Miridae
- Genus: Deraeocoris
- Species: D. ruber

Binomial name
- Deraeocoris ruber (Linnaeus, 1758)

Synonyms
- Cimex ruber Linnaeus, 1758; Cimex segusinus Müller, 1766; Cimex capillaris Fabricius, 1775; Cimex rubens Harris, 1780; Deraeocoris concolor Reuter, 1896; Lygaeus danicus Fabricius, 1794; Deraeocoris bicolor Knight, 1921

= Deraeocoris ruber =

Species of true bug

Deraeocoris ruber, commonly known as the red-spotted plant bug, is a species of bug in the family Miridae.

== Distribution and habitat ==
This species can be found anywhere in Europe, except for Azores, Canary Islands, Cyprus, Faroe Islands, Finland, Iceland, Malta and parts of Russia and the Caucasus. It is also present in the Nearctic realm and in the Neotropical realm. These bugs inhabits forests, but occur mainly on sunny forest edges and open areas.

== Description ==
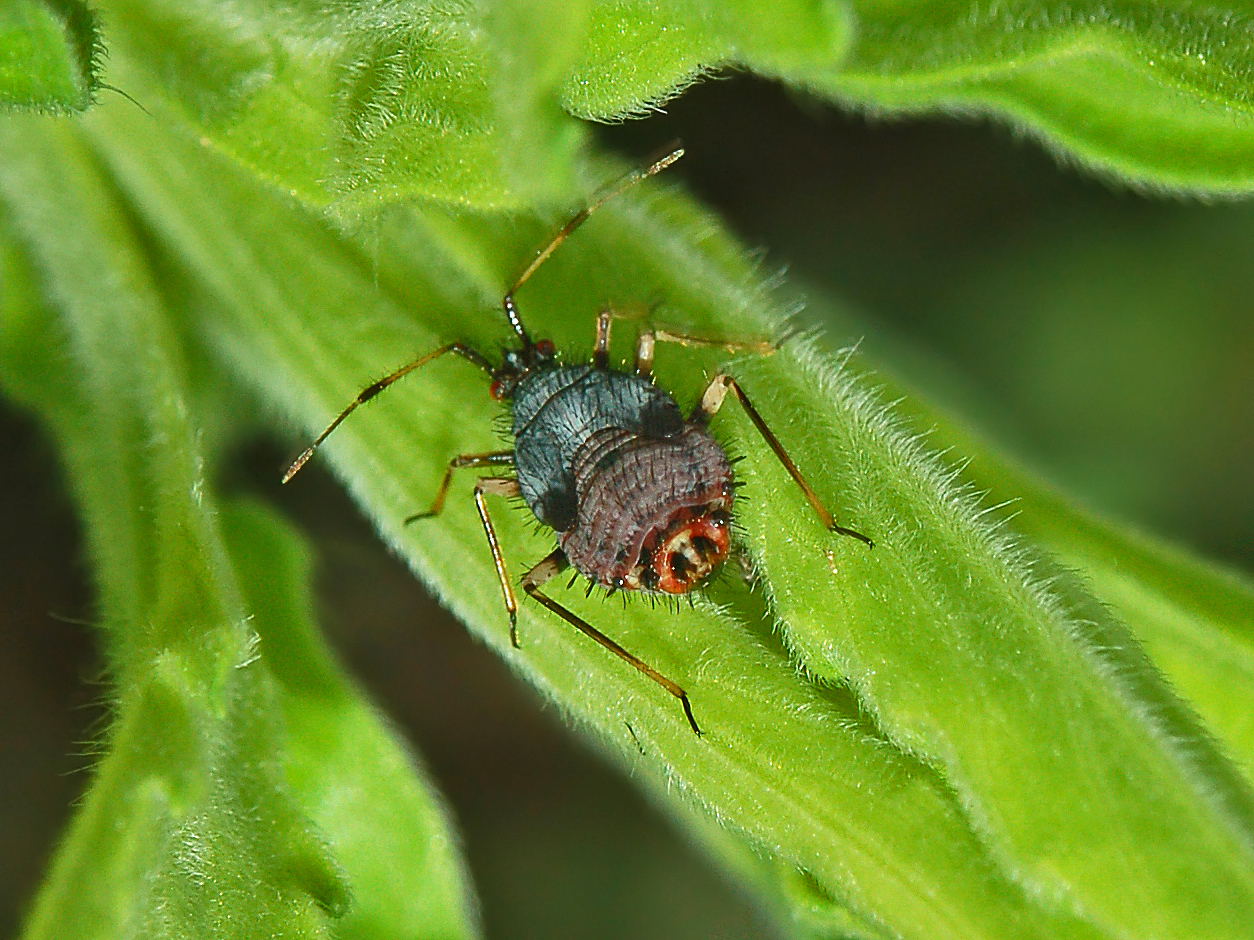
Nymph of Deraeocoris ruber

Deraeocoris ruber is a medium-size species measuring 6–8 millimetres (0.24–0.31 in) long. Body is remarkably wide and glossy. Adults top (including scutellum) may appear in various color variants, ranging from light brown or orange to black in color, while the cuneus is always red. They have shiny forewings with an unbanded tibiae and the 1st antennal segment. The 1st segment of the antennae and at least the base of the 2nd segment are black.

The nymph of Deraeocoris ruber is black coloured with a pinkish wide abdomen bearing black spines.

== Biology ==
This species has one generation a year. Adults can be found from July to September. These bugs are almost completely predators and are also cannibalistic. They mainly feed on aphids and other small insects. They can be found on various plants, especially on nettles, but also on Rubus, Cytisus and Thistles. Trees are preferred to shrubs, including fruit trees, but they are also rarely found on conifers such as pine (Pinus), larches (Larix) and junipers.

== Gallery ==
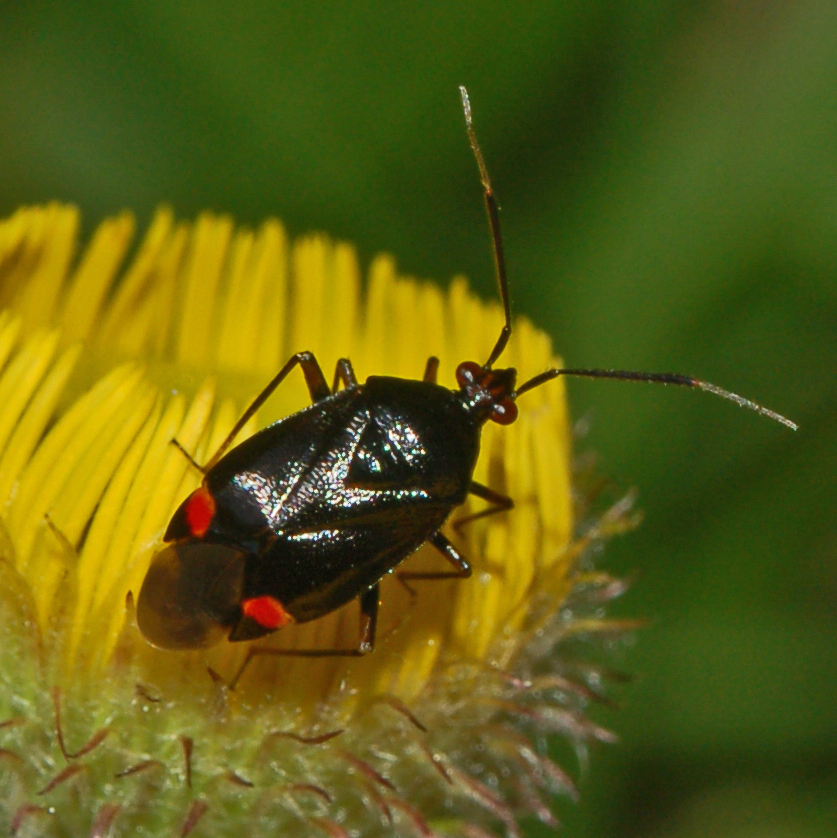
Deraeocoris ruber

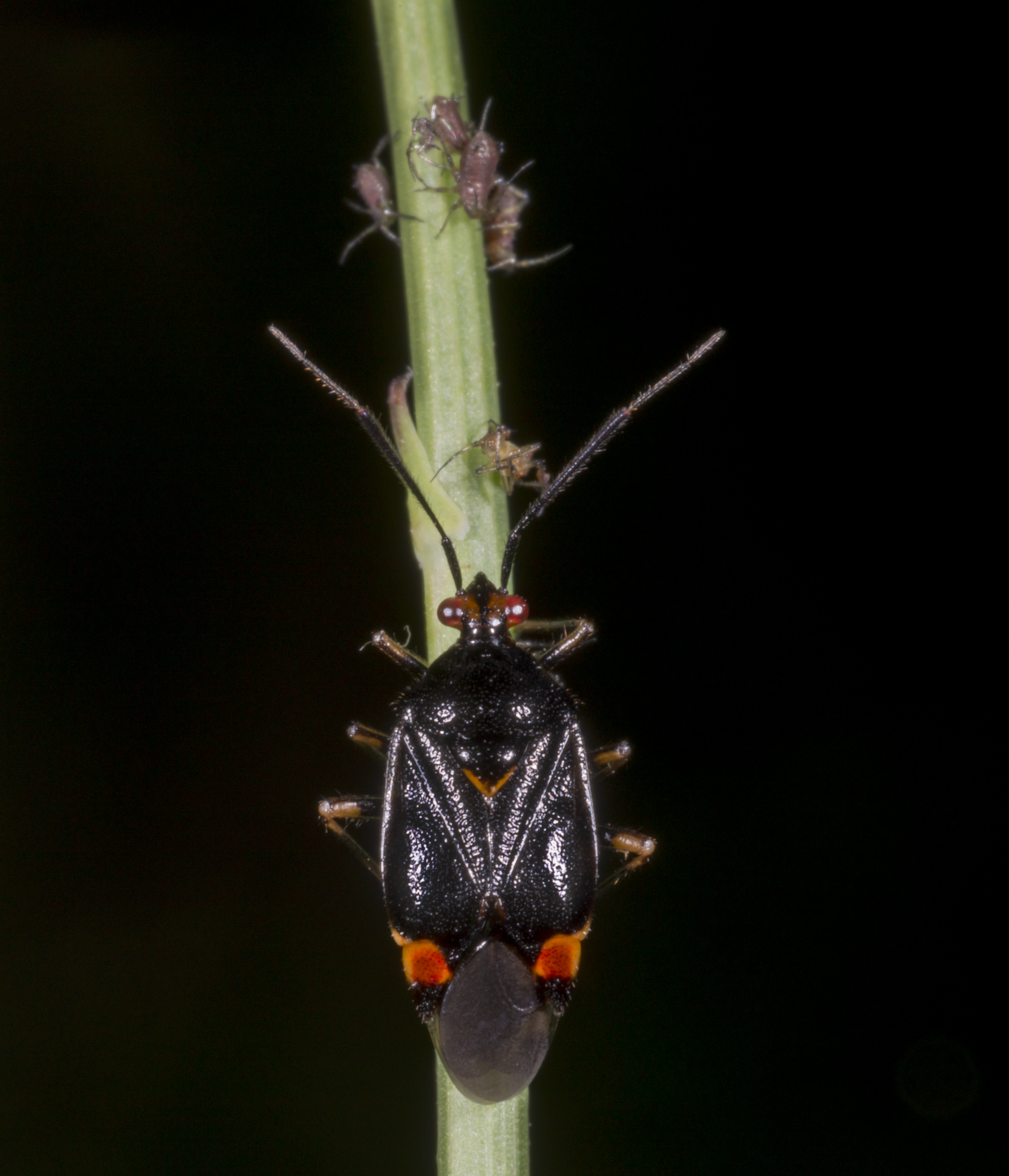
Dark form with aphids

Clip of Deraeocoris ruber on Apiaceae

== Bibliography ==
- Schwartz, Michael D., and G. G. E. Scudder (2000) Miridae (Heteroptera) new to Canada, with some taxonomic changes, Journal of the New York Entomological Society, vol. 108, no. 3–4
- Henry, Thomas J., and Richard C. Froeschner, eds. (1988), Catalog of the Heteroptera, or True Bugs, of Canada and the Continental United States
- Linnaeus, C., 1758: Systema naturae per regna tria naturae, secundum classes, ordines, genera, species, cum characteribus, differentiis, synonymis, locis. Editio Decima, Reformata. Tomus I. Laurentii Salvii, Stockholm. 824 pp. doi: 10.5962/bhl.title.542 BHL
