= Bothynotus =

Scientific classification
- Domain: Eukaryota
- Kingdom: Animalia
- Phylum: Arthropoda
- Class: Insecta
- Order: Hemiptera
- Suborder: Heteroptera
- Family: Miridae
- Tribe: Clivinematini
- Genus: Bothynotus; Fieberm 1864

Genus of true bugs

Bothynotus is a genus of true bugs belonging to the family Miridae. The species of this genus are found in Europe and North America.

== Species ==
The following species are recognised in the genus Bothynotus:

- Bothynotus albonotatus Carvalho, 1953
- Bothynotus albus Carvalho, 1953
- Bothynotus barberi Knight, 1933
- Bothynotus caruaruensis Carvalho, 1985
- Bothynotus castaneus Carvalho, 1953
- Bothynotus floridanus T.Henry, 1979
- Bothynotus impunctatus T.Henry, 1979
- Bothynotus johnstoni Knight, 1933
- Bothynotus mexicanus T.Henry, 1979
- Bothynotus modestus (Wirtner, 1917)
- Bothynotus morimotoi Miyamoto, 1966
- Bothynotus pilosus (Boheman, 1852)
- Bothynotus schaffneri T.Henry, 1979
- Bothynotus sulinus (Carvalho & Gomes, 1969)
