= Eustictus =

Scientific classification
- Kingdom: Animalia
- Phylum: Arthropoda
- Clade: Pancrustacea
- Class: Insecta
- Order: Hemiptera
- Suborder: Heteroptera
- Family: Miridae
- Subfamily: Deraeocorinae
- Genus: Eustictus; Reuter, 1909

Genus of true bugs

Eustictus is a genus of plant bugs in the family Miridae. There are more than 30 described species in Eustictus.

== Species ==
These 39 species belong to the genus Eustictus:

- Eustictus ainsliei Knight, 1927
- Eustictus albocuneatus Knight, 1927
- Eustictus albomaculatus Johnston, 1939
- Eustictus amazonicus Carvalho, 1988
- Eustictus argentinus Carvalho, 1990
- Eustictus brunnipunctatus Maldonado, 1969
- Eustictus californicus Carvalho & Costa, 1991
- Eustictus catulus (Uhler, 1894)
- Eustictus claripennis Knight, 1925
- Eustictus clarus Knight, 1925
- Eustictus goianus Carvalho, 1952
- Eustictus grossus (Uhler, 1887)
- Eustictus guaraniensis Carvalho & Carpintero, 1986
- Eustictus hirsutipes Knight, 1925
- Eustictus incaicus Carvalho, 1987
- Eustictus itatiaiensis Carvalho, 1990
- Eustictus knighti Johnston, 1930
- Eustictus membragilus Carvalho & Costa, 1991
- Eustictus minimus Knight, 1925
- Eustictus morrisoni Knight, 1925
- Eustictus mundus (Uhler, 1887)
- Eustictus necopinus Knight, 1923
- Eustictus nicaraguensis Carvalho & Costa, 1991
- Eustictus obscurus Knight, 1925
- Eustictus oscurus Maldonado, 1969
- Eustictus panamensis Carvalho, 1990
- Eustictus pilipes Knight, 1926
- Eustictus productus Knight, 1925
- Eustictus pubescens Knight, 1926
- Eustictus pusillus (Uhler, 1887)
- Eustictus roraimensis Carvalho & Gomes, 1972
- Eustictus salicicola Knight, 1923
- Eustictus setosus Barber, 1954
- Eustictus sonorensis Carvalho & Costa, 1991
- Eustictus soroaensis Hernandez & Henry, 2010
- Eustictus spinipes Knight, 1926
- Eustictus tibialis Knight, 1927
- Eustictus venatorius Van Duzee, 1912
- Eustictus venezuelanus Carvalho, 1990
