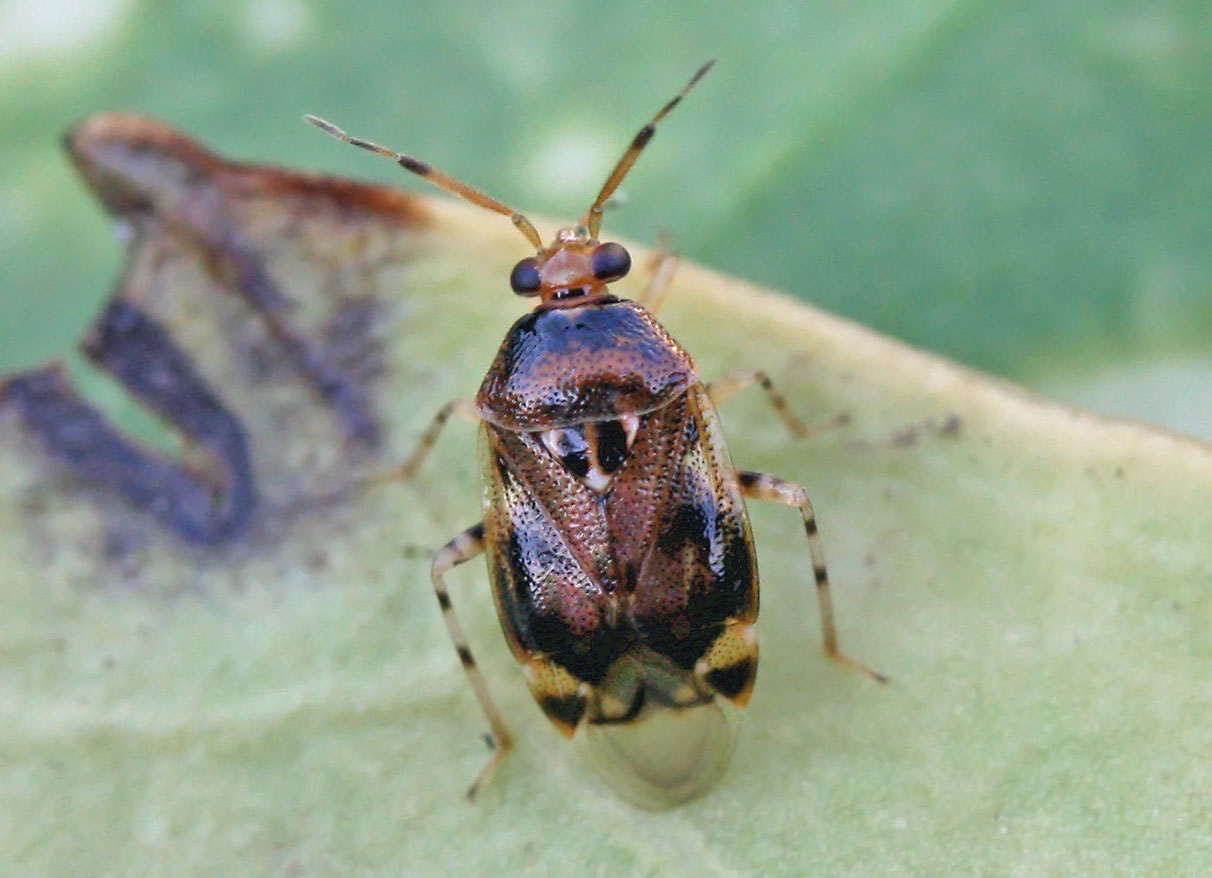
- Deraeocoris lutescens

Scientific classification
- Kingdom: Animalia
- Phylum: Arthropoda
- Clade: Pancrustacea
- Class: Insecta
- Order: Hemiptera
- Suborder: Heteroptera
- Family: Miridae
- Subfamily: Deraeocorinae
- Tribe: Deraeocorini; Douglas & Scott, 1865

= Deraeocorini =

Tribe of true bugs

Deraeocorini is a tribe of plant bugs in the family Miridae. There are at least 19 genera and more than 340 described species in Deraeocorini.

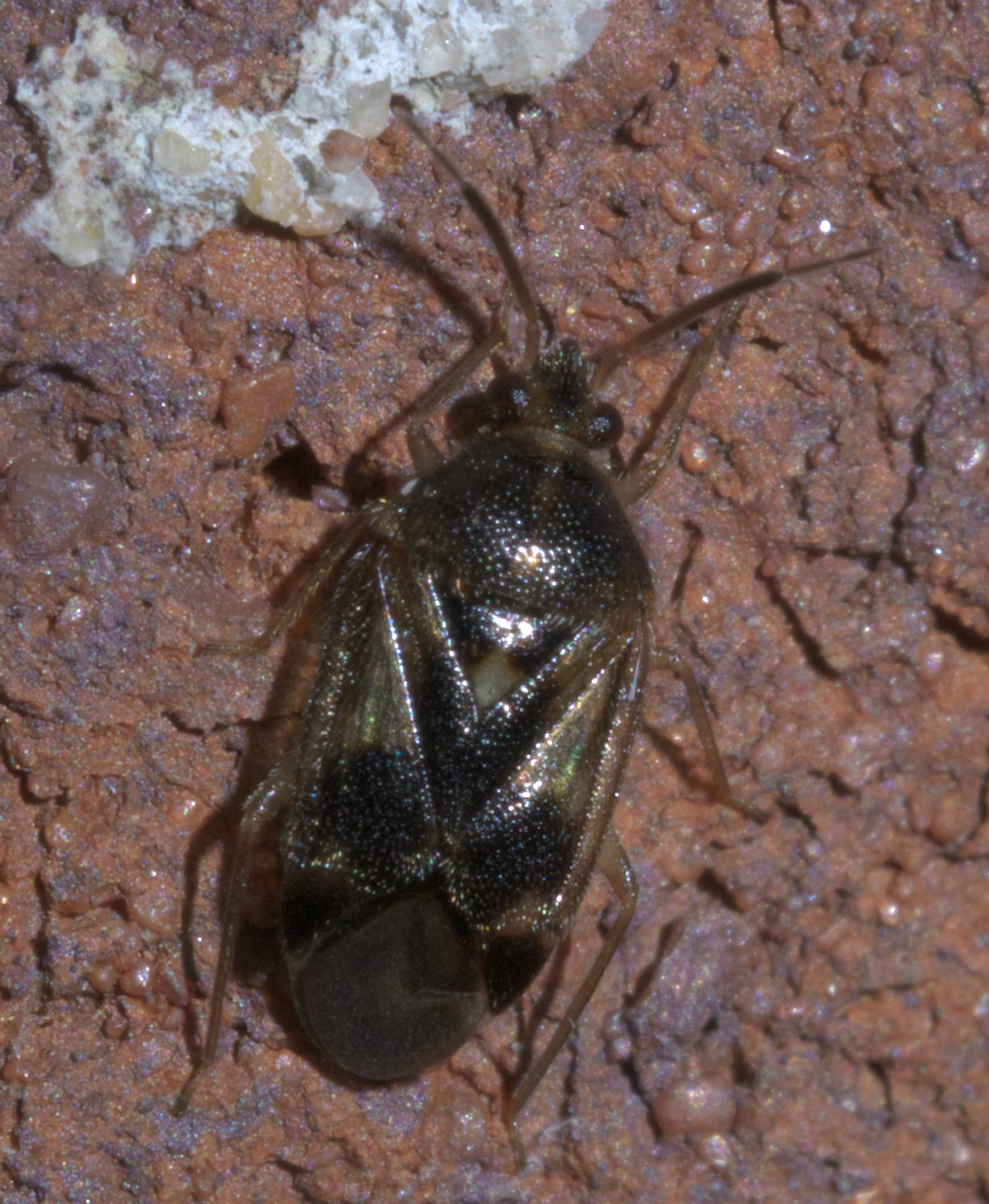
Eurychilopterella luridula

== Genera ==
These genera belong to the tribe Deraeocorini:

- Acutifromiris Hernandez & Stonedahl, 1999
- Agastictus Bergroth, 1922
- Alloeotomus Fieber, 1858
- Apoderaeocoris Nakatani, Yasunaga et Takai, 2007
- Cimicicapsus Poppius, 1915
- Cimidaeorus Hsiao & Ren, 1983
- Deraeocapsus Knight, 1921
- Deraeocoris Kirschbaum, 1856
- Diplozona Van Duzee, 1915
- Eurybrochis Kirkaldy, 1902
- Eurychilopterella Reuter, 1909
- Eustictus Reuter, 1909
- Fingulus Distant, 1904
- Kalamemiris Hosseini & Cassis, 2017
- Klopicoris Van Duzee, 1915
- Platycapsus Reuter, 1904
- Pseudocamptobrochis Poppius, 1911
- Romna Kirkaldy, 1906
- Strobilocapsus Bliven, 1956
- Termatomiris Ghauri, 1975
