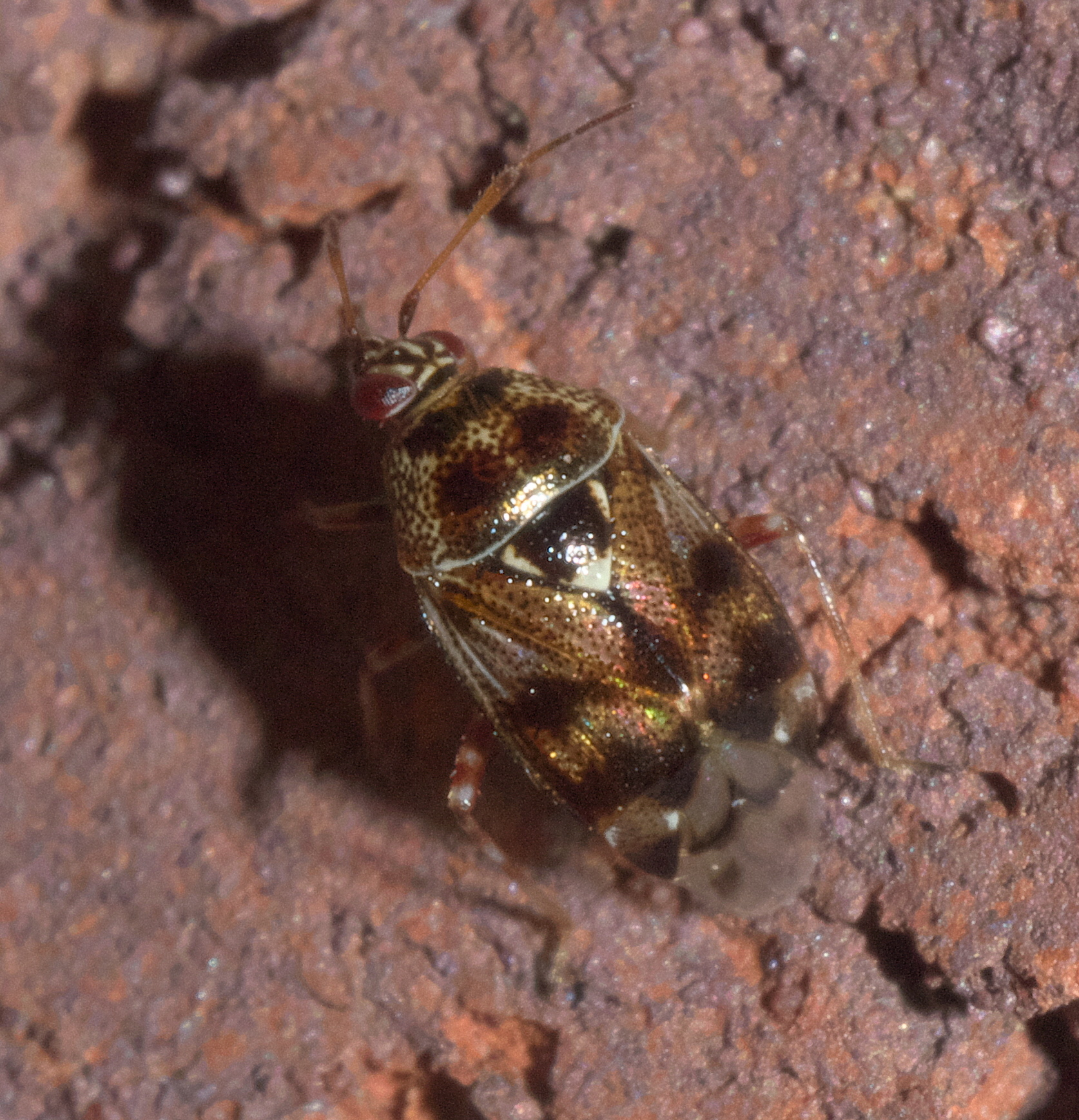
- Deraeocoris nebulosus

Scientific classification
- Domain: Eukaryota
- Kingdom: Animalia
- Phylum: Arthropoda
- Class: Insecta
- Order: Hemiptera
- Suborder: Heteroptera
- Family: Miridae
- Subfamily: Deraeocorinae
- Tribe: Deraeocorini
- Genus: Deraeocoris; Kirschbaum, 1856

= Deraeocoris =

Genus of true bugs

Deraeocoris is a genus of plant bugs in the family Miridae. There are at least 210 described species in Deraeocoris.

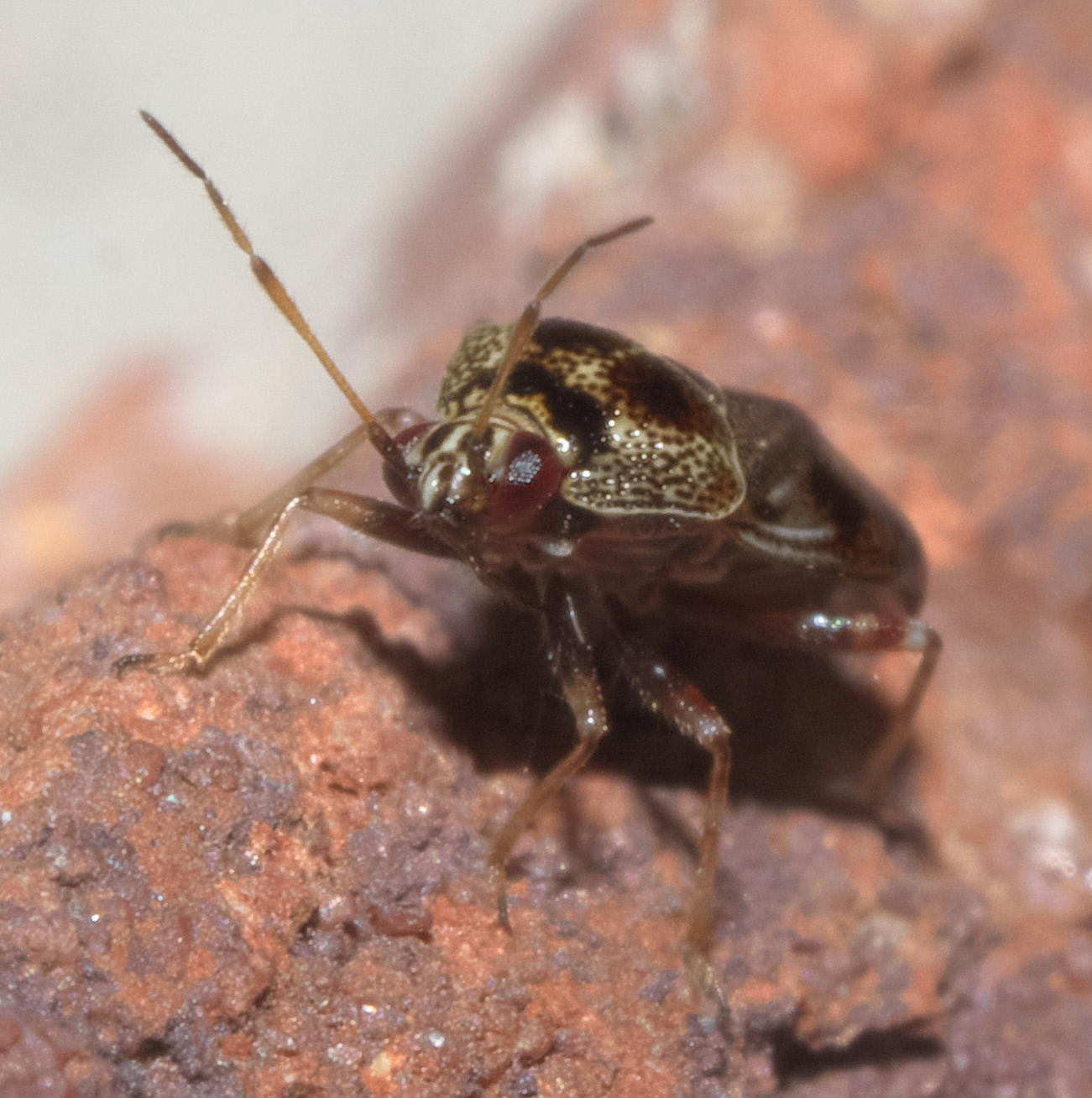
Deraeocoris nebulosus

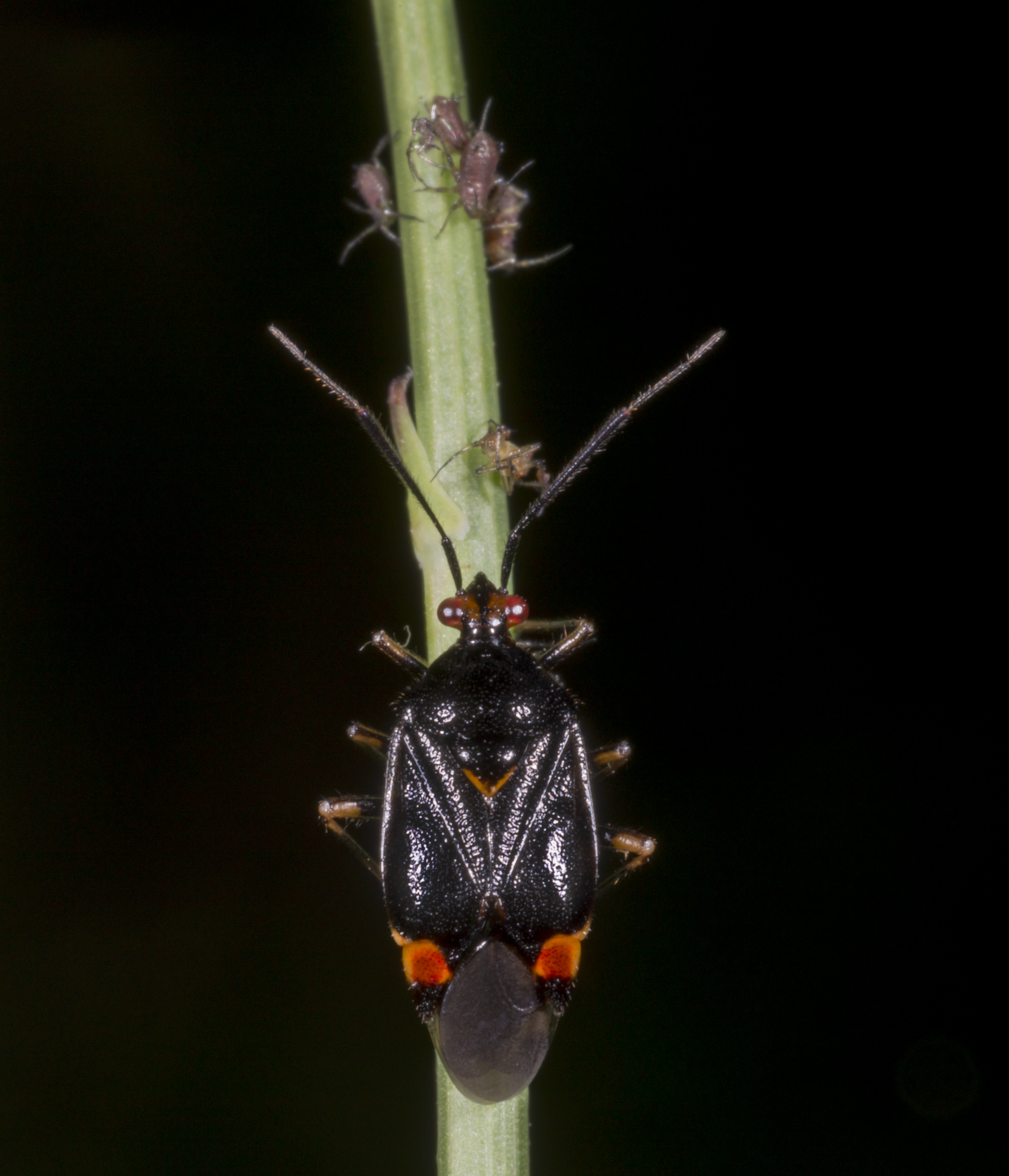
Deraeocoris ruber

== See also ==
- List of Deraeocoris species
