= Odoniella =

Scientific classification
- Domain: Eukaryota
- Kingdom: Animalia
- Phylum: Arthropoda
- Class: Insecta
- Order: Hemiptera
- Suborder: Heteroptera
- Family: Miridae
- Subfamily: Bryocorinae
- Tribe: Dicyphini
- Subtribe: Odoniellina
- Genus: Odoniella; Haglund, 1895

Genus of true bugs

Odoniella is a genus of African bugs in the family Miridae and tribe Dicyphini.

Odoniella is typical of the subtribe (or genus complex) Odoniellina: which includes the economically important, cocoa pest genera Distantiella and Sahlbergella, with this genus and Bryocoropsis also implicated.

== Species ==
The Global Biodiversity Information Facility lists:

1. Odoniella apicalis Reuter & Poppius, 1911
2. Odoniella camerunensis Schumacher, 1917
3. Odoniella immaculipennis Poppius, 1914
4. Odoniella reuteri Haglund, 1895 - type species
5. Odoniella rubra Reuter, 1905
6. Odoniella similis Poppius, 1914
7. Odoniella unicolor Poppius, 1912
