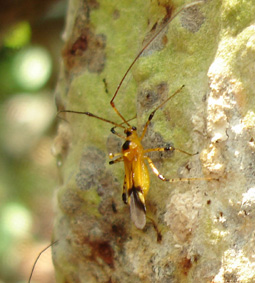
- Helopeltis antonii

Scientific classification
- Kingdom: Animalia
- Phylum: Arthropoda
- Clade: Pancrustacea
- Class: Insecta
- Order: Hemiptera
- Suborder: Heteroptera
- Family: Miridae
- Subfamily: Bryocorinae
- Tribe: Dicyphini
- Genus: Helopeltis
- Species: H. antonii

Binomial name
- Helopeltis antonii V. Signoret, 1858

Synonyms
- Helopeltis antonii Stonedahl, 1991

= Helopeltis antonii =

Species of true bug

Helopeltis antonii, also known as the tea mosquito bug, is a species of heteropteran found within the Miridae family. They have a relatively large geographical distribution and are a known pest of many agricultural “cash” crops such as cocoa, cashew, and tea. Subsequently, their impact negatively influences economic growth within the regions in which they inhabit. Thus, their impact on humans has caused them to be of great interest biologically, resulting in significant environmental implications.

== Distribution ==
Helopeltis antonii are found in a region known as the old-world tropics which encompasses places such as India, Northern Australia, Guinea, Vietnam, Tanzania, Nigeria, and Indonesia. More specifically, they are more concentrated in the agricultural regions of the old-world tropics. In India their distribution is primarily found within the “cashew belt” which is located along the western coast and central regions of the country due to its high affinity for these plants. However, different nations grow certain crops in various locations within their borders. Crops that H. antonii prefer will ultimately determine their specific distribution within a country.

=== Identification of distribution ===
H. antonii are often mistaken and misidentified with other Helopeltis species. Thus, identifying the exact geographical range of H. antonii has become a difficult process. However, recent advances in species identification though DNA barcoding has made it much easier. DNA barcoding is a rapid and relatively inexpensive identification technique that locates unique genetic markers in their DNA allowing for the accurate identification of not only H. antonii, but other species as well.

== Mating ==
Reproduction for H. antonii occurs in 4 stages—arousal, mounting, copulation, and termination of copulation—and occurs year-round. Mounting, arousal, and termination of copulation occurs within a short time frame; copulation is much longer and more variable in length. Mating typically occur in shaded, covered areas

=== Arousal ===
Arousal consists of both chemical and tactile stimuli. Pheromones play an important role in the chemical attraction of females for mating. Although these chemical cues are important, physical cues comprise the bulk of mate attraction and arousal. Males are the sole initiators for reproductive encounters. This first done through sexual identification of a female partner. Sexual identification is only possible when in close proximity of each other. Once a female is located, the male makes contact with the female by gently probing her body with his antennae. Receptive females remain passive, permitting the male to proceed. In contrast, non-receptive females move to escape any further male interaction.

=== Mounting ===
Following the initial arousal, the process of mounting ensues. Males mount females on the posterior region of her body allowing the erect male rostrum to stroke the dorsal side of the female, just below the thoracic shield. This stroking behaviour quiets the female and allows for easier insertion of the male aedeagus into the female genital aperture. If insertion is not achieved the male begins a left to right stroking motion to aid in its insertion. Females can also kick or shake males off to prevent further progression of mating. When this occurs, males are quick to remount and re-attempt insertion of their aedeagus into the female genital aperture. Successful insertion leads to copulation.

=== Copulation ===
Once insertion has been established the male twists around in an end-to-end fashion to allow for copulation. Once in this end-to-end position, both the male and female remain still until copulation has completed. This can last anywhere from 10 minutes to 2 hours.

=== Termination of copulation ===
Following copulation, they abruptly disjoin, however, detachment can be often difficult due to the males' twisted position. Once separated both the male and female begin to feed and clean their own genitals and antenna—this feeding and cleaning behaviour typically occurs within a few steps from the site of copulation. Females do not respond to any other mating advances immediately following copulation. However, females typically reproduce more than once during their lifetime. Interspecific mating has been known to occur between Helopeltis species, specifically between H. antonii and H. theivora. However, their mating results in the production of unviable eggs. The production of eggs following interspecific mating between H. antonii and H. bradyi has not been observed. This ability and inability to engage in interspecific mating is due to the difference in genital structure between females. Females of both H. antonii and H. theivora have sclerotized rings that are not fused, whereas, the females of H. bradyi have fused sclerotized rings in its genitalia. This difference acts like a “lock and key” model for genitalia.

== Oviposition ==
Males and females are able to reproduce and lay viable eggs after their first day of sexual maturity. Unmated females are capable of laying eggs; however, they are sterile. The sex ratio of males to females does not influence the number of eggs a female can lay but environments with a high ratio reduces female longevity due to mating exhaustion. Females that reproduce more than once lay a larger number of eggs during oviposition. Females probe plant tissues with the tip of their rostrum to find a suitable site for the deposition of their eggs. The exact reason behind site choice is unknown, but once found the female bends her abdomen to establish contact between her ovipositor and the plant tissue. The ovipositor is then inserted into the plant tissue and the eggs are deposited, below the epidermis and parenchymatous tissue of the plant, via abdominal contractions. The eggs are ovo-elongate and silvery-white in colour and are approximately 1.0x0.3mm in size. Abundance of eggs laid is also weather dependent. Conditions that yield higher temperatures and increased sun exposure result in a higher abundance; whereas cooler temperatures, less available sunlight, and increased rain exposure reduces abundance.

== Development ==
H. antonii experiences partial metamorphosis, otherwise known as hemimetabolous development, which is characterized by it transition from an egg to nymph and eventually into a matured adult. This developmental pattern takes about 25 days from the time the eggs are laid to adulthood. The eggs take eggs 12–13 days to hatch followed by 12–13 days of progressive nymph instars. H. antonii experience 5 instars in total before reaching adulthood. During the first instar, the body appears light orange in colour and progresses to a deep orange in the second instar. During the third instar, the body beings to develop wing buds and a scutellar horn. Wing pads become visibly prominent as the fourth instar emerges. Finally, in the fifth instar, the wing pads cover half of the abdomen—with the wings being transparent—and the body is light brown in colour but darkens via sclerotization. Additionally, in the fifth instar, the dorsum of the thorax appears red in colour, the tergum of the abdomen a dull white, the dorsal abdominal segment a deep orange colour, and overlapped hemi-elytra covers over the abdomen with its distal end containing a triangular blackish-brown colouration.

The less-matured first, second and third instars tend to group close to each other and remain in proximity of their hatch site for feeding. In contrast, the more matured fourth and fifth instars tend to be more dispersed and feed in areas farther from their hatch site as a result. Matured females have a characteristic white patch present on their fifth abdominal segment.

=== Environmental influence ===
Although colouration is an important identifying feature of H. antonii it is subject to variation due to variations in temperature and sunlight exposure. Red colour morphs tend to peak in abundance during October and reach their minimum abundance during February (for males) and June (for females). Black colour morphs peak during June for both sexes. A brownish-black colour morph is also seen within the population, but its abundance is low, and its frequency remains constant throughout the year.

== Diet and feeding ==
H. antonii are herbivorous insects that have been known to feed on more than 100 different plant species. The sites of feeding, on these plant hosts, are not localized. Rather, both adult and nymphs feed on various sites ranging from tender shoots, buds, stems, and even their fruiting bodies to obtain sap. H. antonii possess modified mouthparts which work to form a long straw-like structure known as a “stylet”. This modified mouth part enables them to suck up sap from deep within the plant tissues that would not otherwise be as easily accessible.

=== Seasonal Consumption ===
H. antonii feed on both native plants as well as agriculturally grown crops. However, their availability changes with the seasons. This change in availability is due to the different growth cycles host plants experience throughout the year. As host plants enter their fruiting or flushing stages, they begin to have a higher rates of sap production and as a result become targeted by H. antonii. In native, non-cultivated, habitats there appears to be a preference for certain types of host plants even when many others are present. During January to February Annona is preferred, from March to April neem is preferred, from May to August papaya is preferred, and from September to December Singapore cherry is preferred. In addition to the consumption of native plant species, agricultural “cash crops” such black pepper, cashew, cocoa, and tea as are often at high risk for consumption and damage due to their large-scale cultivation and ease of accessibility. However, their feeding schedule on these is agricultural crops are more restricted based due to growing and harvest seasons.

=== Plant preference ===
Like the seasonal preference of plants, preference is also seen in consumption habits of fruits with respect to different plants. For example, in custard apples the immature fruits are preferred over the matured fruits. Whereas in the Singapore cherries there is no observed feeding preference for immature or mature fruits.

=== Biological mechanics ===
Feeding requires the insertion of their stylet into the plant tissues. This insertion results in the secretion of saliva. Present within their saliva are toxic substances that cause death of plant tissues following feeding. However, the biochemical understanding of the toxin's toxicology and function within the saliva is poorly understood and is a site of current research.

== Predators ==
Being a pest to many agricultural crops, resulting in severe destruction of plants following their consumption, have since made H. antonii a major target in hopes to reduce their prevalence in the agricultural industry. The use of insecticides and pesticides have long been used in an attempt to manage and reduce the damaging effects of H. antonii feeding. However, the effectiveness of these chemicals are concentration and volume dependent with respect to the type being used. Some of these pesticides have a prevalence of 500 liters per hectare at concentrations ranging from 50g/L-500g/L. The use of such chemical agents poses a risk not only to the environment but to humans as well—as exposure and administration levels continue to increase so too does its level of toxicity. Additionally, many countries that import these crops do not import those that have traces of pesticides. Thus, natural predators and parasitoids have been looked to for their biological control properties to prevent the use of these harmful chemicals.

=== Biological control ===
H. antonii are subject to both predation and parasitism via parasitoids. Parasitoids of both nymph and adult morphs include Hymenoptera (Braconidae, Platygastridae) and Diptera (Sarcophagidae). Predators are more extensive in diversity and consist of Hymenoptera (Formicidae, Vespidae), Coleoptera, Mantodea, and Odonata.

Of specific interest and use are hymenopteran parasitoids, specifically, Telenomus cupis due to their high specificity and specialization on H. antonii eggs. The employment of these parasitoid specialists has significantly decreased the abundance of H. antonii eggs to effectively reduce their devastating impact on agricultural crops. Additionally, these hymenopteran parasitoids are one of the few parasitoids that are active year-round.

The combined use of pesticides and biological control agents are less effective in reducing the number of H. antonii within agricultural systems. This is because these pesticides also act against biological control agents—reducing their effectiveness. Additionally, the biological control agents tend to be more affected by pesticides than H. antonii. Biological predators and parasitoids are more affected than H. antonii due to their increase locomotory abilities causing them to be exposed to larger amounts of the synthetic pesticides found on crops. The extensive and prolonged use of pesticides and its lesser effect on H. antonii, when compared to its biological control agents, raises concerns regarding pesticide resistance. However, such evidence has yet to suggest the acquisition of pesticide resistance in H. antonii.

== Ecological and economic damage ==
H. antonii foraging behaviour, especially on commercially produced crops, has devastating impacts on overall crop yields showing yield reduction of as much as 35-75 percent. As more of the native landscape becomes converted into agricultural lands it provides an increased food supply for them. This increased food supply allows for an increase in population. As their population increases more plant tissues are subject to damage and injury. Thus, injured plants are no longer able to allocate their desired resources into fruit/seed production, rather, they are forced to allocate resources and energy into damage control and repair. This alternative allocation of resources is what causes the observed yield reductions. Poor yields result in poor economic outcomes for producers which also has adverse consequences for consumers such as increased prices, as well as an overall reduction in the number and overall quality of available products.

Foraging behaviour of H. antonii causes necrotic lesions to develop on plant tissues at feeding sites which can cause the death to new plant buds. Bud death inhibits plants from producing fruit—decreasing yield. Similarly, feeding on premature and mature fruits causes fruit desiccation resulting in a reduction in size and quality—as seen in cashew plants.

=== Fungal contribution ===
Although feeding results in necrotic lesioning and desiccation, it is not the only factor that impacts yield. Following foraging, fungal pathogens can enter the wound tissues more readily and cause die-back of shoots and is the primary cause of inflorescence blight. Even though fungal blight is a common occurrence in various plants, the wounds caused by H. antonii in plant tissues exacerbates and accelerates its effects. Die-back from blight also limits the plant's ability to produce products and grow—further perpetuating yield loss.
