= Cyrtopeltis =

Scientific classification
- Kingdom: Animalia
- Phylum: Arthropoda
- Clade: Pancrustacea
- Class: Insecta
- Order: Hemiptera
- Suborder: Heteroptera
- Family: Miridae
- Subfamily: Bryocorinae
- Tribe: Dicyphini
- Genus: Cyrtopeltis; Kirkaldy, 1902

Synonyms
- Canariesia Carapezza, 1988

Genus of true bugs

Cyrtopeltis is a genus of capsid bugs in the tribe Dicyphini (subtribe Dicyphina), erected by Franz Xaver Fieber in 1860. Species have been recorded from the African, Palaearctic, Nearctic and Oriental realms; the type species, Cyrtopeltis geniculata Fieber, 1861 is from mainland (mostly southern) Europe. Some crop pest species including the tomato bug and "Cyrtopeltis nicotianae" have been placed here, but are now included in the related genus Engytatus.

== Species ==
The On-line Systematic Catalogue of Plant Bugs includes:

1. Cyrtopeltis callosus Odhiambo, 1961
2. Cyrtopeltis canariensis (Lindberg, 1936)
3. Cyrtopeltis geniculata Fieber, 1861
4. Cyrtopeltis kahakai Asquith, 1993
5. Cyrtopeltis melanocephala Reuter, 1909
6. Cyrtopeltis miyamotoi (Yasunaga, 2000)
7. Cyrtopeltis nakatanii Yasunaga, 2000
8. Cyrtopeltis rufobrunnea Lee and Kerzhner, 1995
9. Cyrtopeltis salviae Carapezza, 1988
10. Cyrtopeltis taxila Seidenstucker, 1972
