= Usingerella simplex =

Scientific classification
- Domain: Eukaryota
- Kingdom: Animalia
- Phylum: Arthropoda
- Class: Insecta
- Order: Hemiptera
- Suborder: Heteroptera
- Family: Miridae
- Tribe: Dicyphini
- Genus: Usingerella
- Species: U. simplex

Binomial name
- Usingerella simplex (Reuter, 1909)

Synonyms
- Cyrtopeltis simplex Reuter, 1909

Species of true bug

Usingerella simplex is a species of plant bug in the family Miridae. It is found in North America.
