= Tupiocoris agilis =

Scientific classification
- Domain: Eukaryota
- Kingdom: Animalia
- Phylum: Arthropoda
- Class: Insecta
- Order: Hemiptera
- Suborder: Heteroptera
- Family: Miridae
- Tribe: Dicyphini
- Genus: Tupiocoris
- Species: T. agilis

Binomial name
- Tupiocoris agilis (Uhler, 1877)

Species of true bug

Tupiocoris agilis is a species of plant bug in the family Miridae. It is found in North America.
