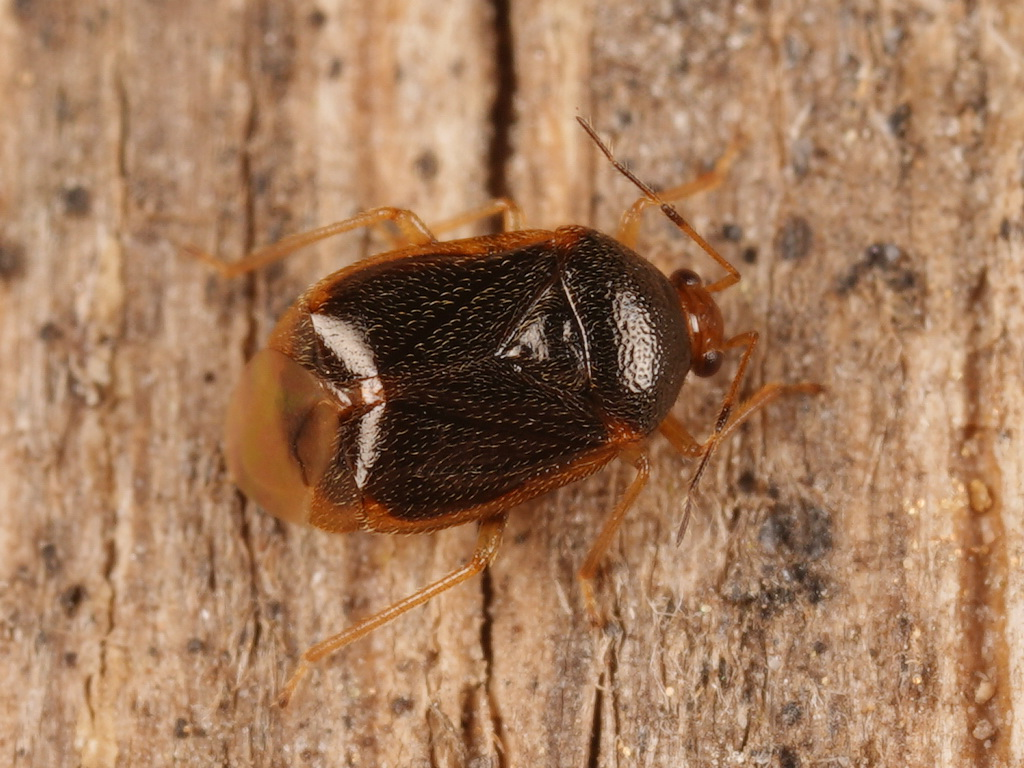

Scientific classification
- Kingdom: Animalia
- Phylum: Arthropoda
- Class: Insecta
- Order: Hemiptera
- Suborder: Heteroptera
- Family: Miridae
- Genus: Monalocoris
- Species: M. filicis

Binomial name
- Monalocoris filicis (Linnaeus, 1758)

= Monalocoris filicis =

Bracken Bug

Species of true bug

Monalocoris filicis, commonly known as the bracken bug, is a true bug in the family Miridae. The species is found in Europe from Ireland in the West and including the northern edge of the Mediterranean and the East across the Palearctic to Central Asia, Korea and Japan. In Central Europe, it is widespread and generally common. In the Alps, it occurs up to the edge of the forest. Habitats are deciduous and coniferous forests and moist, open habitats such as bogs or the shores of streams.

Adults are 2.0-3.1 mm long and are a golden brown color, and have a pale-orange head and are therefore easily identifiable. They are similar to Bryocoris pteridis from which they can be distinguished by the first segment of the antenna, which is shorter than the head is wide. The adult animals are always fully winged (macropterous).

Monalocoris filicis feeds on Dryopteris filix-mas and Pteridium aquilinum occasionally alongside Monalocoris parvulus. They suck especially immature spore plants in late summer. The males are strong fliers and swarm during the mating season, when they are found also on other plants. The females lay green eggs from May until early June on the host plants, where they are indistinguishable from the similarly colored spores. Nymphs are found primarily in June and July, adult bugs from the end of June to the mating season. In the September/early October, the imagines leave the host plants to overwinter, hibernating as an imago in the dry remains of their host plants on the ground, in the leaf litter or branches of conifers (usually Picea abies).
