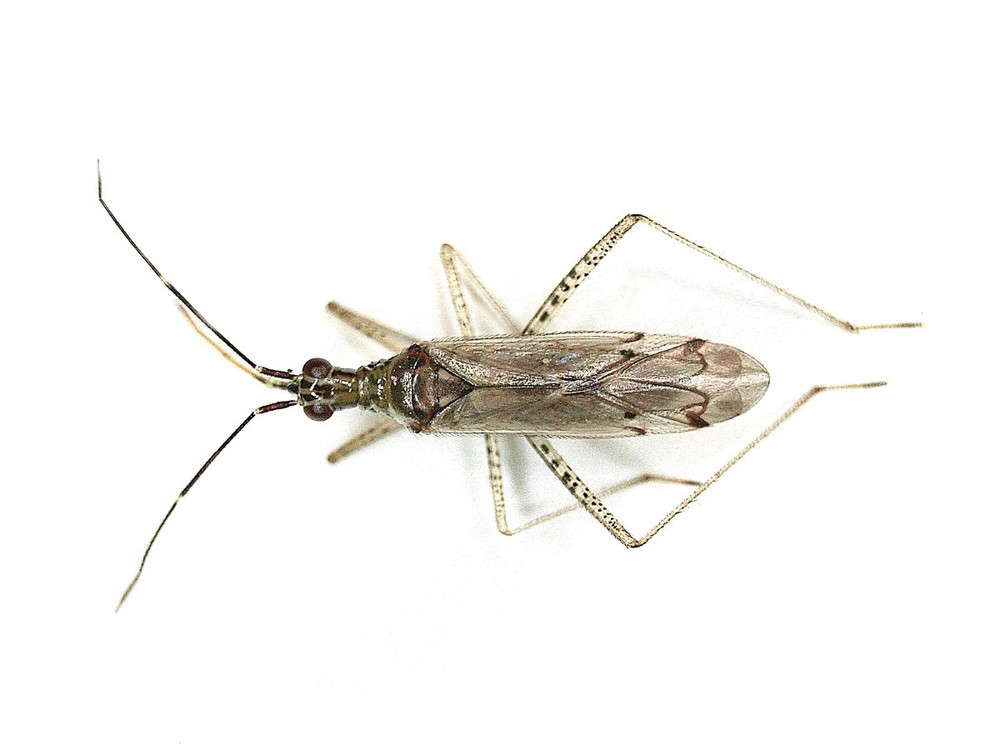
- Dicyphus errans Elst (Gld), the Netherlands

Scientific classification
- Kingdom: Animalia
- Phylum: Arthropoda
- Clade: Pancrustacea
- Class: Insecta
- Order: Hemiptera
- Suborder: Heteroptera
- Family: Miridae
- Genus: Dicyphus
- Species: D. errans

Binomial name
- Dicyphus errans (Wolff, 1804)

= Dicyphus errans =

Species of true bug

Dicyphus errans is a species of Palearctic true bugs in the family Miridae; it is the type species of its genus and the tribe Dicyphini.

== Description ==
Members of this genus can be difficult to identify using morphological features, but general colouration and host plants can be informative. D. errans is a predatory species and found throughout the British Isles on a variety of herbaceous plants. It is found in most of Europe including Scandinavia and Russia. In the British Isles, adults are usually recorded in June–October and are almost always long-winged (macropterous); they are typically 4.5–5 mm long.

D. errans individuals are variable and pale forms can resemble D. epilobii; dark insects are more distinctive, with the head, pronotum and the first two antennal segments largely black. A distinguishing feature is the mesopleuron which is entirely dark (in contrast to pale in D. epilobii). There are usually also dark markings on the sides of the head and segments 2-4 of the antennae.
