= Chamus =

Scientific classification
- Kingdom: Animalia
- Phylum: Arthropoda
- Clade: Pancrustacea
- Class: Insecta
- Order: Hemiptera
- Suborder: Heteroptera
- Family: Miridae
- Subfamily: Bryocorinae
- Tribe: Dicyphini
- Subtribe: Odoniellina
- Genus: Chamus; Distant, 1904

Genus of insects

Chamus is a genus of Miridae or capsid bugs in the tribe Dicyphini and subtribe Odoniellina. Species can be found in central and southern Africa, with the type C. wealei first described by Distant in 1904.

== Species ==
The Global Biodiversity Information Facility lists:

1. Chamus conradsianus Schouteden, 1942
2. Chamus incertus Reuter & Poppius, 1911
3. Chamus mefisto Reuter & Poppius, 1911
4. Chamus overlaeti Schouteden, 1942
5. Chamus reuteri Poppius, 1914
6. Chamus schroederi Poppius, 1912
7. Chamus wealei Distant, 1904 - type species (synonym C. ghesquierei Schouteden, 1942)
