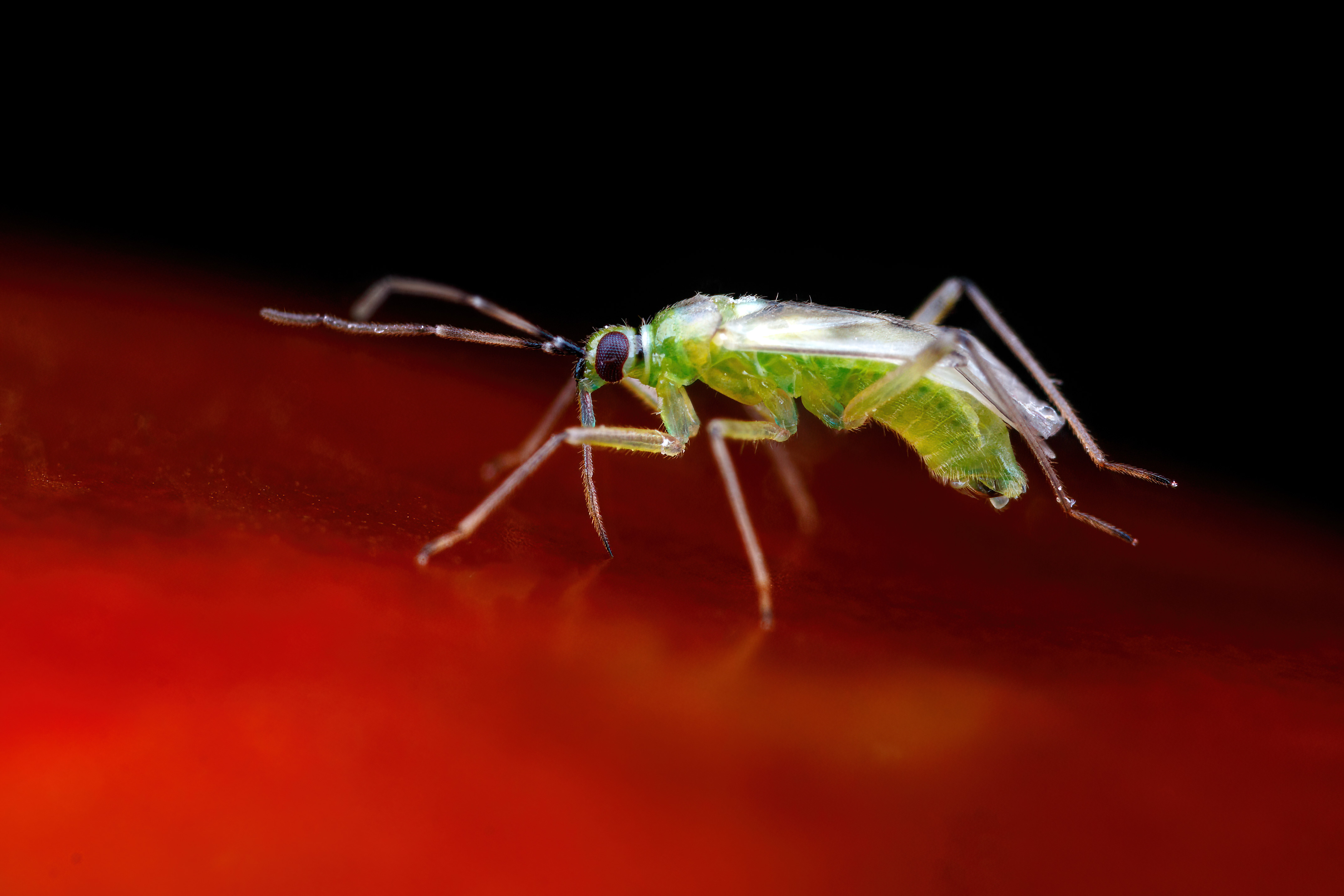
- Nesidiocoris tenuis

Scientific classification
- Kingdom: Animalia
- Phylum: Arthropoda
- Clade: Pancrustacea
- Class: Insecta
- Order: Hemiptera
- Suborder: Heteroptera
- Family: Miridae
- Subfamily: Bryocorinae
- Tribe: Dicyphini
- Genus: Nesidiocoris; Kirkaldy, 1902

Synonyms
- Cyrtopeltis Nesidiocoris Carvalho 1958; Gallobelicus Distant, 1904; Gallobellicus Oshanin, 1912

= Nesidiocoris =

Genus of true bugs

Nesidiocoris is a genus of capsid bugs in the tribe Dicyphini (subtribe Dicyphina), erected by George Willis Kirkaldy in 1902. Species have been recorded from the African, Palaearctic, Oriental and Australasian realms; the type species, Nesidiocoris volucer Kirkaldy, 1902 is from West Africa.

== Species ==
The On-line Systematic Catalogue of Plant Bugs includes:

1. Nesidiocoris alkannae (Linnavuori, 1975)
2. Nesidiocoris atricornis (Distant, 1913)
3. Nesidiocoris brunneicollis (Linnavuori, 1975)
4. Nesidiocoris caesar (Ballard, 1927)
5. Nesidiocoris callani (Odhiambo, 1961)
6. Nesidiocoris cruentatus (Ballard, 1927)
7. Nesidiocoris dilutus (Odhiambo, 1961)
8. Nesidiocoris echinopis (Linnavuori and Al-Safadi, 1993)
9. Nesidiocoris flavoviridis (Linnavuori, 1975)
10. Nesidiocoris floridus (Odhiambo, 1961)
11. Nesidiocoris kristenseni (Poppius, 1914)
12. Nesidiocoris leontion (Linnavuori, 1974)
13. Nesidiocoris longicornis (Linnavuori, 1975)
14. Nesidiocoris macfiei (Poppius, 1914)
15. Nesidiocoris montivaga (Linnavuori, 1975)
16. Nesidiocoris nigricornis (Linnavuori, 1974)
17. Nesidiocoris pallens (Poppius, 1914)
18. Nesidiocoris plebejus (Poppius, 1915)
19. Nesidiocoris poppiusi (Carvalho, 1958)
20. Nesidiocoris pulchricornis (Poppius, 1914)
21. Nesidiocoris scutellaris (Poppius, 1914)
22. Nesidiocoris tabaci (Froggatt, 1920)
23. Nesidiocoris tenuis (Reuter, 1895)
24. Nesidiocoris tuberculifer (Linnavuori, 1975)
25. Nesidiocoris volucer Kirkaldy, 1902
