= Monalocoris americanus =

Scientific classification
- Domain: Eukaryota
- Kingdom: Animalia
- Phylum: Arthropoda
- Class: Insecta
- Order: Hemiptera
- Suborder: Heteroptera
- Family: Miridae
- Tribe: Bryocorini
- Genus: Monalocoris
- Species: M. americanus

Binomial name
- Monalocoris americanus Wagner & Slater, 1952

Species of true bug

Monalocoris americanus is a species of plant bug in the family Miridae. It is found in the Caribbean Sea and North America.
