= Dicyphus famelicus =

Scientific classification
- Domain: Eukaryota
- Kingdom: Animalia
- Phylum: Arthropoda
- Class: Insecta
- Order: Hemiptera
- Suborder: Heteroptera
- Family: Miridae
- Tribe: Dicyphini
- Genus: Dicyphus
- Species: D. famelicus

Binomial name
- Dicyphus famelicus (Uhler, 1878)

Species of true bug

Dicyphus famelicus is a species of plant bug in the family Miridae. It is found in North America.
