= Usingerella =

Scientific classification
- Kingdom: Animalia
- Phylum: Arthropoda
- Clade: Pancrustacea
- Class: Insecta
- Order: Hemiptera
- Suborder: Heteroptera
- Family: Miridae
- Subfamily: Bryocorinae
- Tribe: Dicyphini
- Genus: Usingerella; China & Carvalho, 1952

Genus of true bugs

Usingerella is a genus of North American plant bugs in the family Miridae. There are at least two described species in Usingerella.

== Species ==
These two species belong to the genus Usingerella:

- Usingerella bakeri (Knight, 1943)
- Usingerella simplex (Reuter, 1909)
