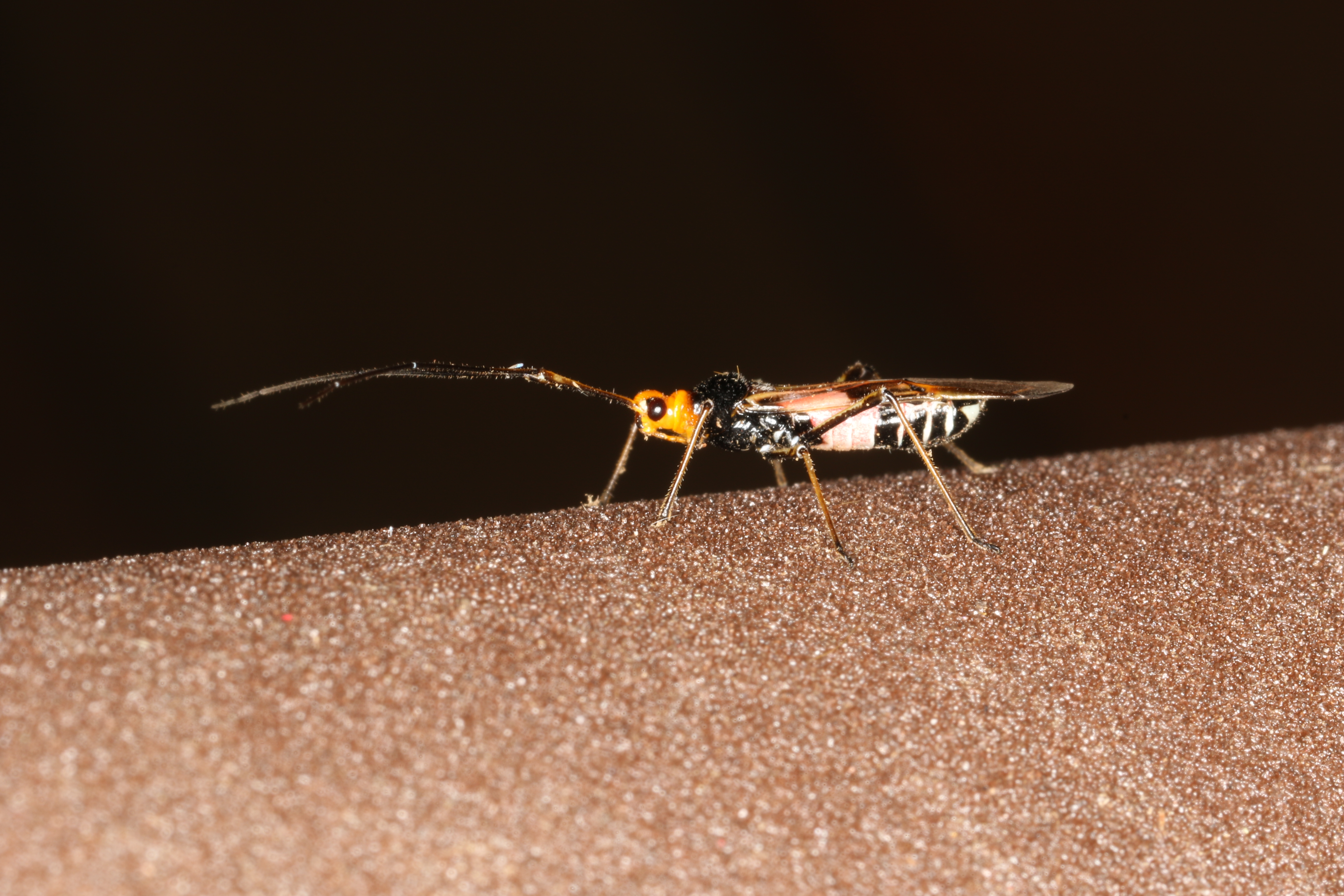
- Rayieria basifer

Scientific classification
- Missing taxonomy template (fix): Rayieria

= Rayieria =

Genus of true bugs

Rayieria is a genus of Australian capsid bugs in the tribe Dicyphini (subtribe Monaloniina), erected by Thomas Odhiambo in 1962 as part of a review of the subfamily Bryocorinae. The type species is Rayieria basifer, which originally had been placed in genus Eucerocoris by Francis Walker in 1873.

== Species ==
The On-line Systematic Catalogue of Plant Bugs includes:

1. Rayieria basifer (Walker, 1873)
2. Rayieria braconoides (Walker, 1873)
3. Rayieria tumidiceps (Horvath, 1902)
