= Pachypeltis (bug) =

Scientific classification
- Kingdom: Animalia
- Phylum: Arthropoda
- Clade: Pancrustacea
- Class: Insecta
- Order: Hemiptera
- Suborder: Heteroptera
- Family: Miridae
- Subfamily: Bryocorinae
- Tribe: Dicyphini
- Genus: Pachypeltis; Signoret, 1858

Synonyms
- Disphinctus Stal, 1871

Genus of true bugs

Pachypeltis is a genus of Indomalayan capsid bugs in the tribe Dicyphini (subtribe Monaloniina), erected by Victor Signoret in 1858. Records of occurrence include India, Bangladesh, China, Japan, Indochina and Malesia.

== Species ==
The On-line Systematic Catalogue of Plant Bugs includes:

1. Pachypeltis anadyomene (Kirkaldy, 1902)
2. Pachypeltis annulipes Poppius, 1912
3. Pachypeltis biformis Hu and Zheng, 1999
4. Pachypeltis brevirostris Poppius, 1912
5. Pachypeltis chinensis V. Signoret, 1858 - type species
6. Pachypeltis cinnamomi Zheng and Liu, 1992
7. Pachypeltis corallinus Poppius, 1915
8. Pachypeltis dudgeoni (Kirkaldy, 1902)
9. Pachypeltis elegans (Distant, 1904)
10. Pachypeltis fallenii (Stal, 1871)
11. Pachypeltis gigas Carvalho, 1981
12. Pachypeltis haglundii (Stal, 1871)
13. Pachypeltis humerale (Walker, 1873)
14. Pachypeltis javanus Poppius, 1914
15. Pachypeltis maesarum (Kirkaldy, 1902)
16. Pachypeltis marginalis Poppius, 1912
17. Pachypeltis philippinensis (Distant, 1910)
18. Pachypeltis politum (Walker, 1873)
19. Pachypeltis reuteri (Stal, 1871)
20. Pachypeltis sahlbergii (Stal, 1871)
21. Pachypeltis sassafri Zheng and Liu, 1992
22. Pachypeltis stali (Distant, 1910)
23. Pachypeltis sumatrator (Kirkaldy, 1902)
24. Pachypeltis vittiscutis (Bergroth, 1894)
25. Pachypeltis wangi Zheng and Li, 1992
