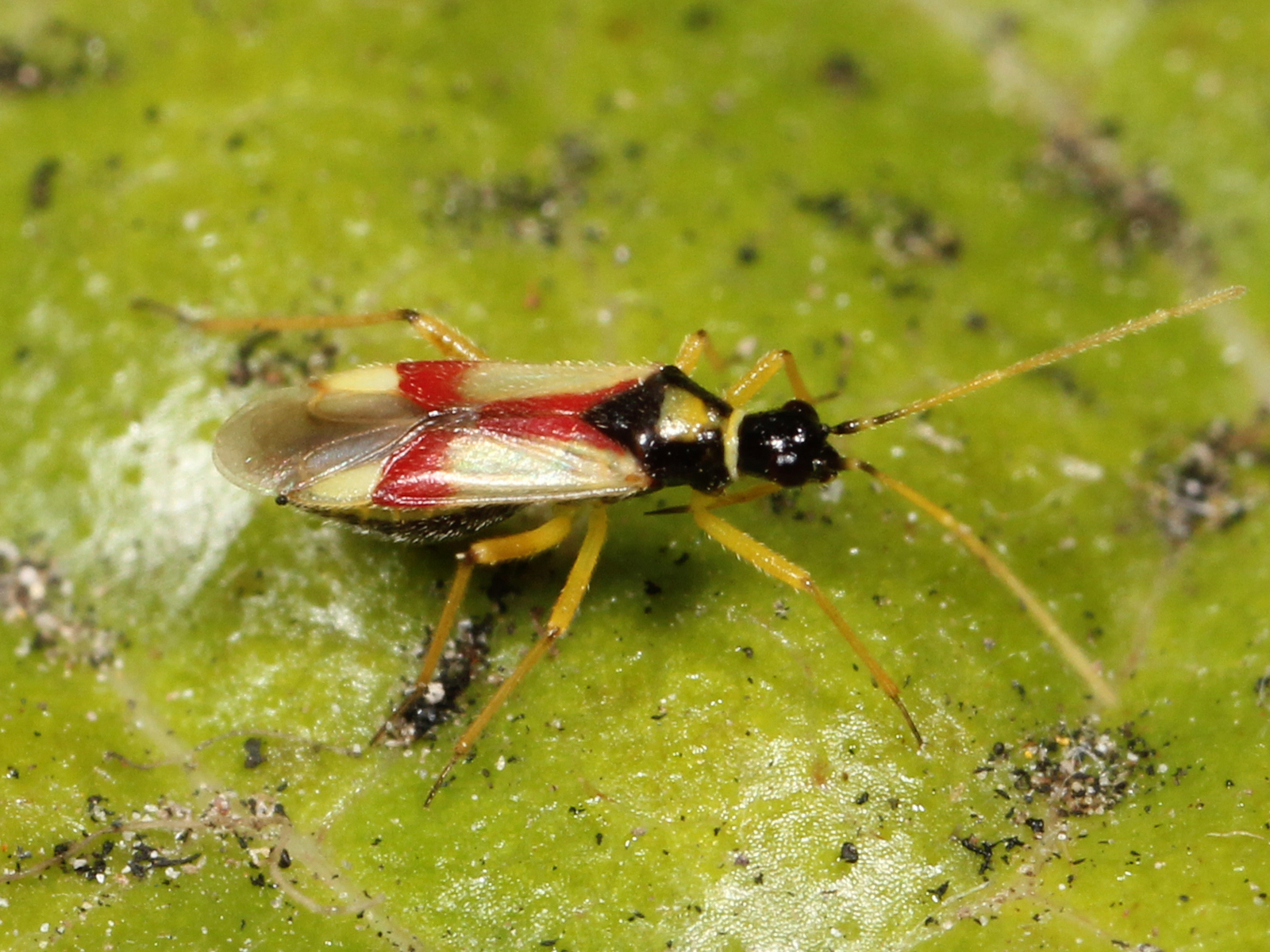
- Tupiocoris californicus

Scientific classification
- Domain: Eukaryota
- Kingdom: Animalia
- Phylum: Arthropoda
- Class: Insecta
- Order: Hemiptera
- Suborder: Heteroptera
- Family: Miridae
- Tribe: Dicyphini
- Genus: Tupiocoris; China & Carvalho, 1952

= Tupiocoris =

Genus of true bugs

Tupiocoris is a genus of plant bugs in the family Miridae. There are about 9 described species in Tupiocoris.

== Species ==
- Tupiocoris agilis (Uhler, 1877)
- Tupiocoris californicus (Stal, 1859)
- Tupiocoris killamae Schwartz and Scudder, 2003
- Tupiocoris notatus (Distant, 1893) (suckfly)
- Tupiocoris rhododendri (Dolling, 1972)
- Tupiocoris rubi (Knight, 1968)
- Tupiocoris rufescens
- Tupiocoris similis (Kelton, 1980)
- Tupiocoris tinctus (Knight, 1943)
