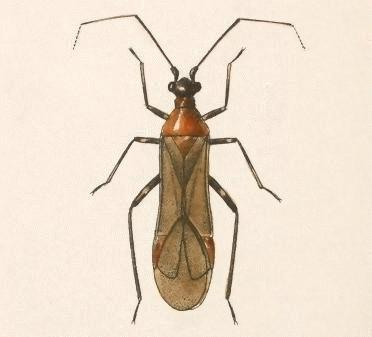
- Monalonion annulipes

Scientific classification
- Domain: Eukaryota
- Kingdom: Animalia
- Phylum: Arthropoda
- Class: Insecta
- Order: Hemiptera
- Suborder: Heteroptera
- Family: Miridae
- Subfamily: Bryocorinae
- Tribe: Dicyphini
- Genus: Monalonion; Herrich-Schäffer, 1850

= Monalonion =

Genus of true bugs

Monalonion is a genus of bugs in the family Miridae and tribe Dicyphini (subtribe Monaloniina).

Species are mostly distributed in Central and South America, where some including M. bondari, have minor pest status: causing damage similar to Helopeltis spp. in SE Asian cacao.

== Species ==
The Global Biodiversity Information Facility lists:

- Monalonion annulipes V.Signoret, 1858
- Monalonion atratum Distant, 1883
- Monalonion bahiense Costa Lima, 1938
- Monalonion bicolor Carvalho & Costa, 1988
- Monalonion bondari Costa Lima, 1938
- Monalonion columbiensis Carvalho, 1984
- Monalonion decoratum Monte, 1942
- Monalonion dissimulatum Distant, 1883
- Monalonion flavisignatum Knight
- Monalonion incaicus Carvalho, 1972
- Monalonion itabunensis Carvalho, 1972
- Monalonion paraensis Carvalho, 1985
- Monalonion parviventre Herrich-Schaeffer, 1850
- Monalonion peruvianus Kirkaldy, 1907
- Monalonion schaefferi Stal, 1860
- Monalonion velezangeli Carvalho & Costa, 1988
- Monalonion versicolor Distant, 1883
