= Bryocoris =

Scientific classification
- Kingdom: Animalia
- Phylum: Arthropoda
- Class: Insecta
- Order: Hemiptera
- Suborder: Heteroptera
- Family: Miridae
- Subfamily: Bryocorinae
- Tribe: Bryocorini
- Genus: Bryocoris; Fallen, 1829

Genus of true bugs

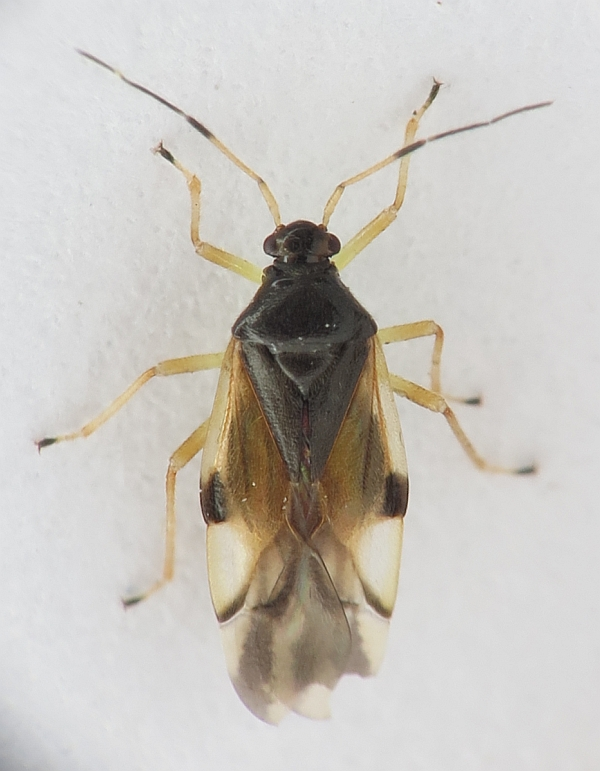
Bryocoris pteridis

Bryocoris is a genus of plant bugs belonging to the family Miridae.

The genus was first described by Fallén in 1829.

The species of this genus are found in Europe and Japan.

== Species ==
These species belong to the genus Bryocoris:

- Bryocoris biquadrangulifer (Reuter, 1906)
- Bryocoris bui Hu & Zheng, 2000
- Bryocoris concavus Hu & Zheng, 2000
- Bryocoris convexicollis Hsiao, 1941
- Bryocoris flaviceps Zheng & Liu, 1992
- Bryocoris formosensis Linnaeus, 2003
- Bryocoris gracilis Linnavuori, 1962
- Bryocoris hsiaoi Zheng & Liu, 1992
- Bryocoris insuetus Hu & Zheng, 2000
- Bryocoris latiusculus Hu & Zheng, 2007
- Bryocoris latus Linnaeus, 2003
- Bryocoris lii Hu & Zheng, 2000
- Bryocoris lobatus Hu & Zheng, 2000
- Bryocoris montanus Kerzhner, 1972
- Bryocoris nitidus Hu & Zheng, 2004
- Bryocoris paravittatus Linnaeus, 2003
- Bryocoris persimilis Kerzhner, 1988
- Bryocoris pteridis (Fallén, 1807)
- Bryocoris sichuanensis Hu & Zheng, 2000
- Bryocoris vittatus Hu & Zheng, 2000
- Bryocoris xiongi Hu & Zheng, 2000
