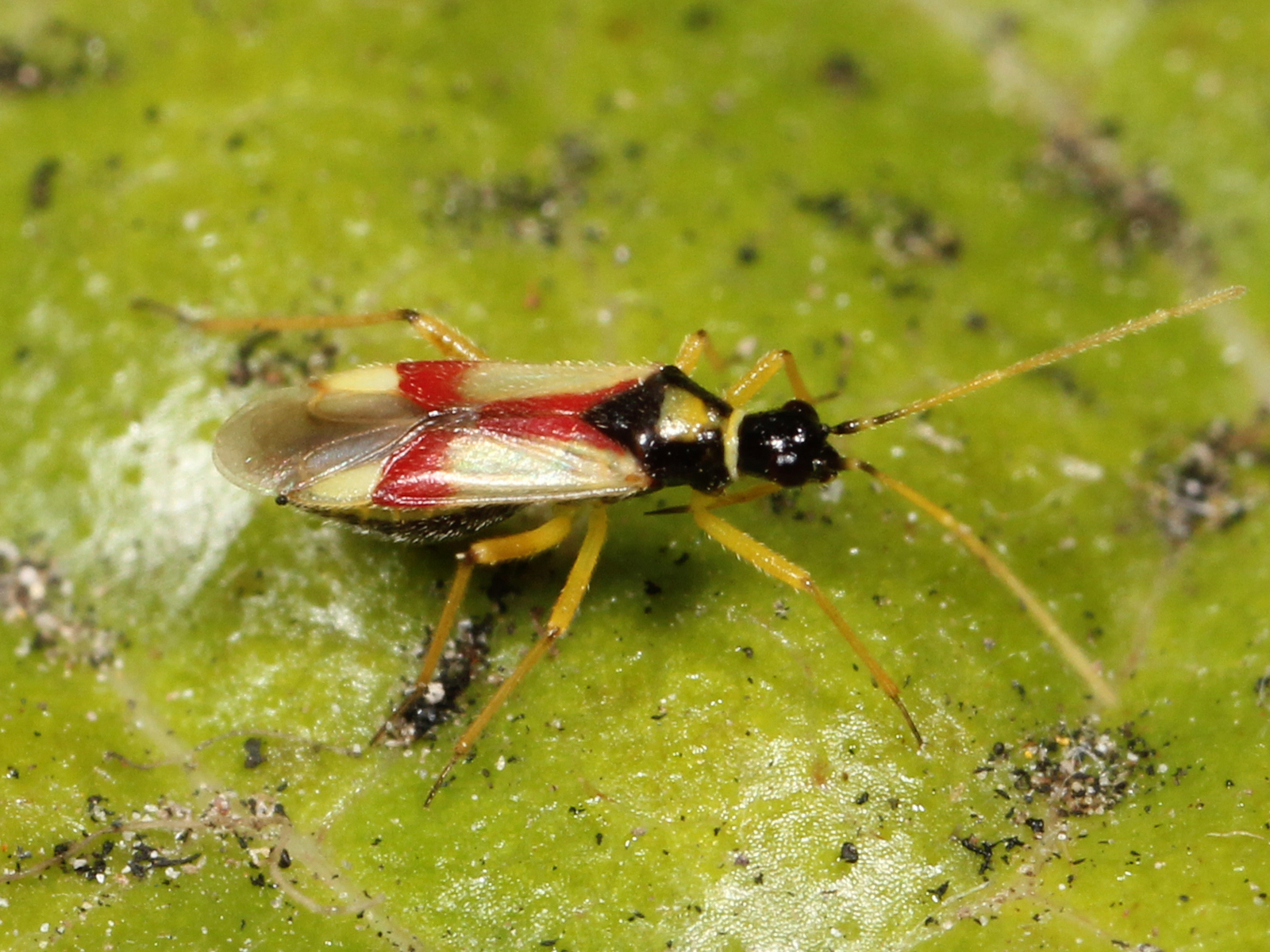

Scientific classification
- Domain: Eukaryota
- Kingdom: Animalia
- Phylum: Arthropoda
- Class: Insecta
- Order: Hemiptera
- Suborder: Heteroptera
- Family: Miridae
- Genus: Tupiocoris
- Species: T. californicus

Binomial name
- Tupiocoris californicus (Stal, 1859)

= Tupiocoris californicus =

Species of true bug

Tupiocoris californicus is a species of plant bug in the family Miridae.
