= Bryocoropsis =

Scientific classification
- Domain: Eukaryota
- Kingdom: Animalia
- Phylum: Arthropoda
- Class: Insecta
- Order: Hemiptera
- Suborder: Heteroptera
- Family: Miridae
- Subfamily: Bryocorinae
- Tribe: Dicyphini
- Subtribe: Odoniellina
- Genus: Bryocoropsis; Schumacher, 1917

Genus of true bugs

Bryocoropsis is a genus of African mirid bugs in the tribe Dicyphini and subtribe Odoniellina; it was erected by Friedrich Schumacher in 1917.

== Species ==
The Global Biodiversity Information Facility lists:

1. Bryocoropsis cotterelli China, 1929
2. Bryocoropsis kasaica Schouteden, 1942
3. Bryocoropsis laticollis Schumacher, 1917 - type species
4. Bryocoropsis soror Schouteden, 1946
5. Bryocoropsis vrijdaghi (Schouteden, 1942)
