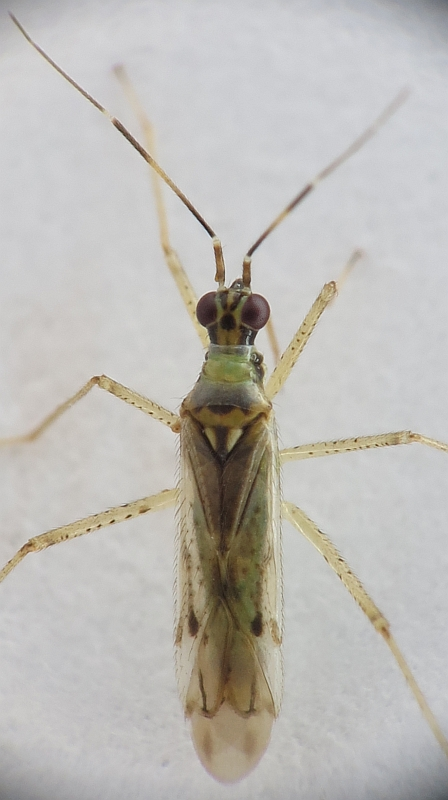
- Dicyphus constrictus male, Helsinki Finland

Scientific classification
- Kingdom: Animalia
- Phylum: Arthropoda
- Clade: Pancrustacea
- Class: Insecta
- Order: Hemiptera
- Suborder: Heteroptera
- Family: Miridae
- Genus: Dicyphus
- Species: D. constrictus

Binomial name
- Dicyphus constrictus (Boheman, 1852)

= Dicyphus constrictus =

Species of true bug

Dicyphus constrictus is a Palearctic species of true bug.
