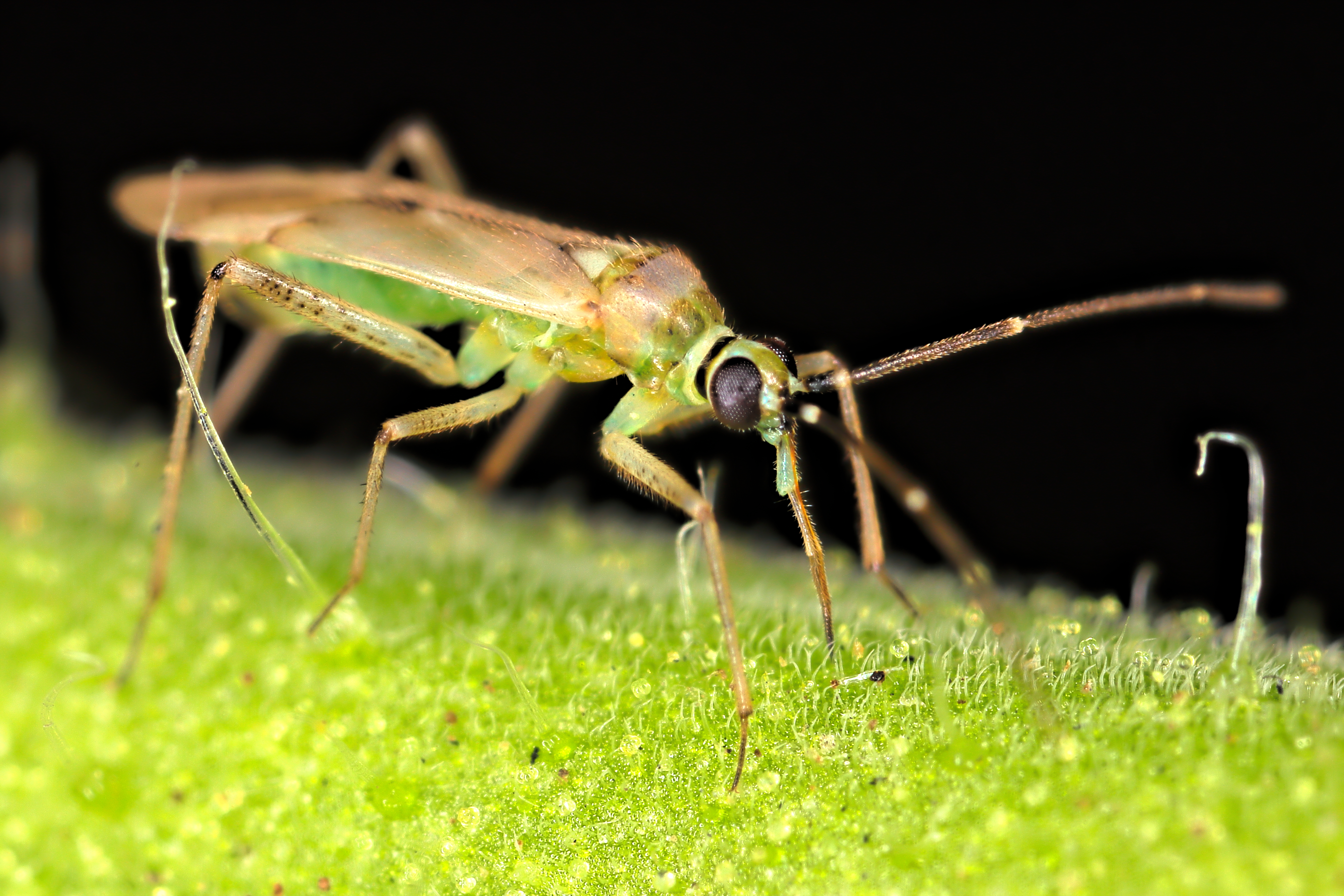
- Engytatus modestus

Scientific classification
- Kingdom: Animalia
- Phylum: Arthropoda
- Clade: Pancrustacea
- Class: Insecta
- Order: Hemiptera
- Suborder: Heteroptera
- Family: Miridae
- Subfamily: Bryocorinae
- Tribe: Dicyphini
- Genus: Engytatus; Reuter, 1875

= Engytatus =

Genus of true bugs

Engytatus is a genus of plant bugs in the family Miridae, erected by Odo Reuter in 1875. Species of Engytatus are found in Australia, New Zealand and the Americas. This genus includes the crop pest species Engytatus nicotianae (previously placed in Cyrtopeltis) and the tomato bug

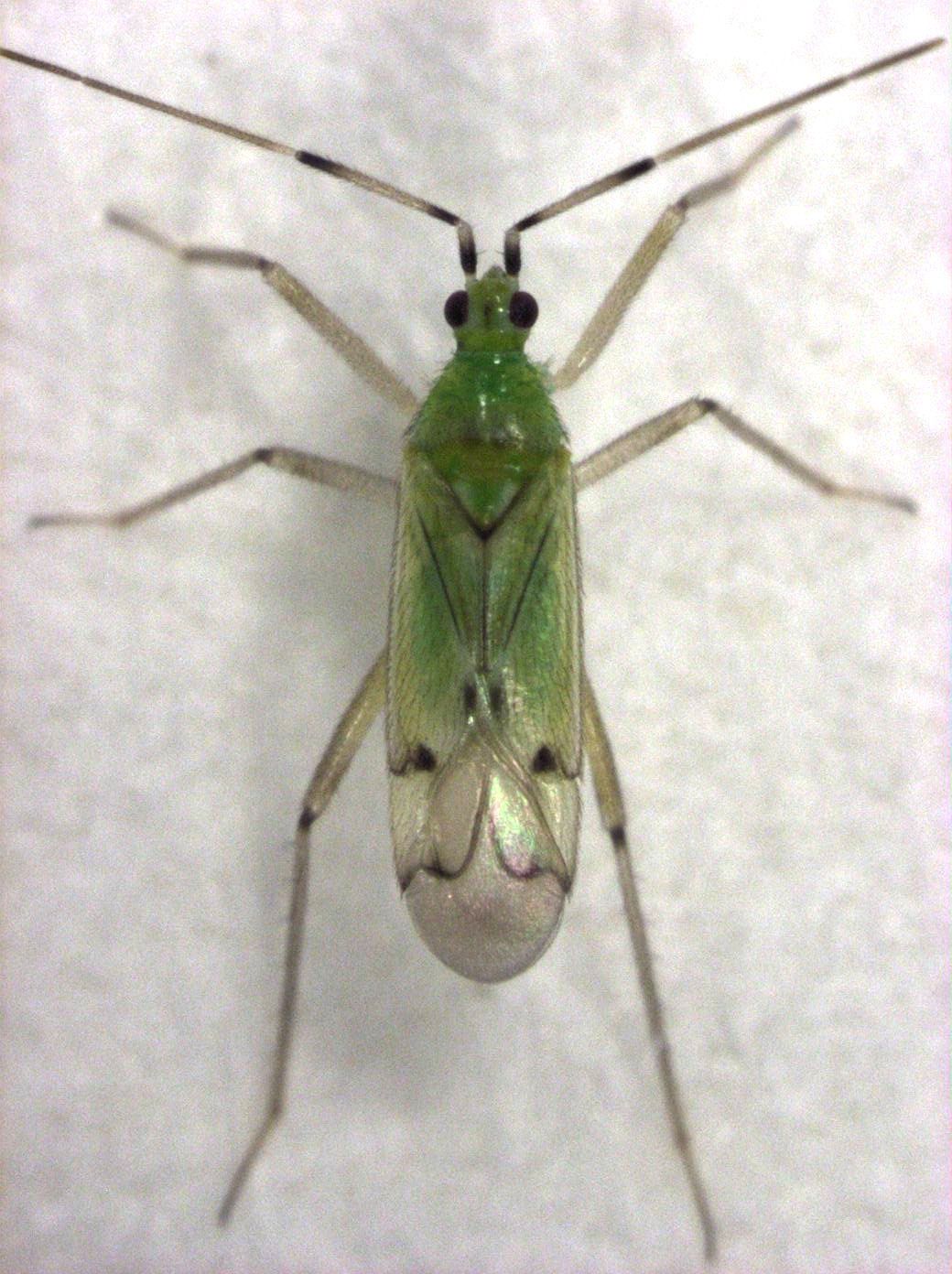
Engytatus nicotianae

== Species ==
These 28 species belong to the genus Engytatus:

- Engytatus acuminatus (Knight, 1938)
- Engytatus affinis (Gagne, 1968)
- Engytatus andinus (Carvalho & Becker, 1958)
- Engytatus arida (Gagne, 1968)
- Engytatus aristidesi (Carvalho, 1975)
- Engytatus confusa (Perkins, 1912)
- Engytatus cyrtandrae (Gagné, 1969)
- Engytatus floreanae (Gagne, 1968)
- Engytatus gummiferae (Gagne, 1968)
- Engytatus hawaiiensis (Kirkaldy, 1902)
- Engytatus helleri (Gagne, 1968)
- Engytatus itatiaianus (Carvalho, 1980)
- Engytatus lacteus (Spinola, 1852)
- Engytatus lysimachiae (Carvalho & Usinger, 1960)
- Engytatus marquesanus (Knight, 1938)
- Engytatus minutus (Knight, 1938)
- Engytatus modestus (Distant, 1893) (tomato bug)
- Engytatus nicotianae (Koningsberger, 1903)
- Engytatus perplexa (Gagné, 1969)
- Engytatus phyllostegiae (Carvalho & Usinger, 1960)
- Engytatus quitoensis (Carvalho & Gomes, 1968)
- Engytatus rubescens (Distant, 1884)
- Engytatus seorsus (Van Duzee, 1934)
- Engytatus sidae (Gagné, 1969)
- Engytatus similaris (Carvalho, 1947)
- Engytatus terminalis (Gagné, 1969)
- Engytatus tuberculatus (Knight, 1938)
- Engytatus varians (Distant, 1884)
