= Distantiella =

Scientific classification
- Domain: Eukaryota
- Kingdom: Animalia
- Phylum: Arthropoda
- Class: Insecta
- Order: Hemiptera
- Suborder: Heteroptera
- Family: Miridae
- Subfamily: Bryocorinae
- Tribe: Dicyphini
- Subtribe: Odoniellina
- Genus: Distantiella; China, 1944

Genus of true bugs

Distantiella is a genus of African bugs, of the family Miridae or "capsids", named after William Lucas Distant. This genus is placed in the subtribe Odoniellina: which has been included in tribes Dicyphini or Monaloniini.

== Species ==
The Global Biodiversity Information Facility lists:

1. Distantiella collarti (Schouteden, 1935)
2. Distantiella theobroma (Distant, 1909) - type species (as Sahlbergella theobroma Distant)

== Description, distribution and importance ==
The two species of Distantiella are very similar to each other externally and the genus is most similar to Sahlbergella: the latter genus differs in hind tibia with "regular" setation as opposed to dense setation in Distantiella.

Both species are distributed in tropical Africa and their host plants are known to include various species of Malvaceae and Citrus. D. theobroma is a major insect pest of cacao, causing damage similar to Sahlbergella singularis in tropical Africa and Helopeltis spp. in SE Asia.
