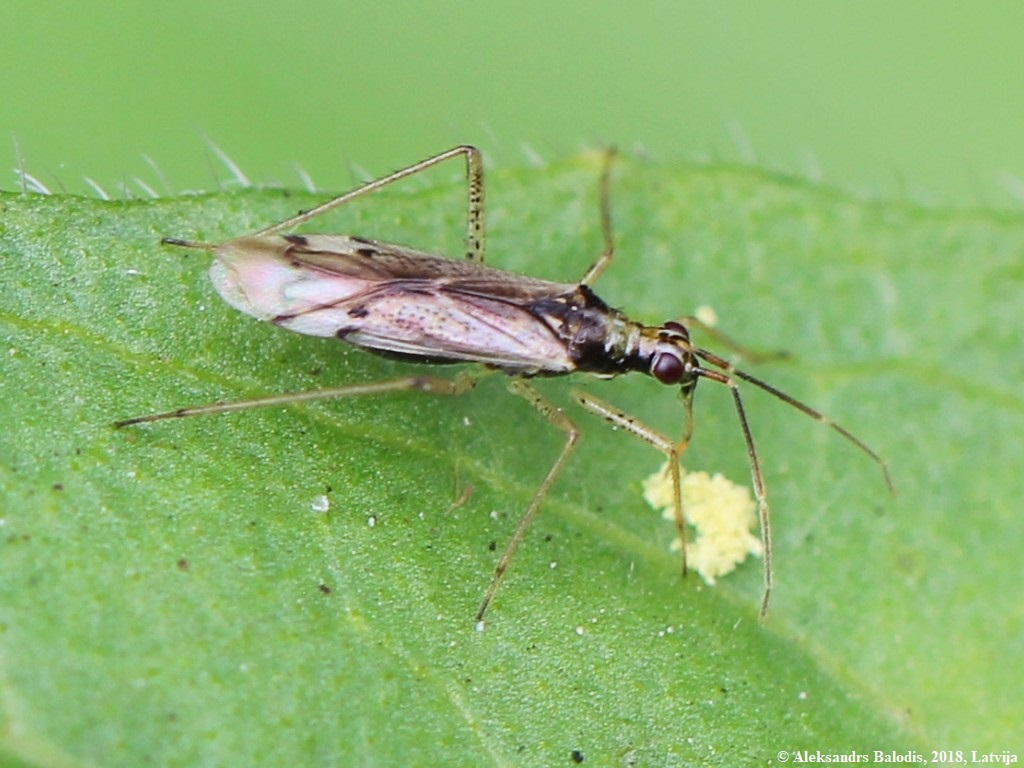
- Dicyphus errans

Scientific classification
- Kingdom: Animalia
- Phylum: Arthropoda
- Clade: Pancrustacea
- Class: Insecta
- Order: Hemiptera
- Suborder: Heteroptera
- Family: Miridae
- Subfamily: Bryocorinae
- Tribe: Dicyphini
- Genus: Dicyphus; Fieber, 1858

Synonyms
- Idolocoris Douglas and Scott, 1865

= Dicyphus =

Genus of true bugs

Dicyphus is a genus of plant bugs in the family Miridae and type genus of the tribe Dicyphini. Records of described Dicyphus species are mostly from the Palaearctic and Nearctic realms.

Nymph of Dicyphus sp.

== Species ==
These 79 species belong to the genus Dicyphus:

- Dicyphus agilis (Uhler, 1877)^{i}
- Dicyphus albonasutus Wagner, 1951^{c g}
- Dicyphus alkannae Seidenstucker, 1956^{c g}
- Dicyphus alluaudi Vidal, 1952^{c g}
- Dicyphus annulatus (Wolff, 1804)^{c g}
- Dicyphus azadicus Linnavuori and Hosseini, 1999^{c g}
- Dicyphus baezi Ribes, 1983^{c g}
- Dicyphus bolivari Lindberg, 1934^{c g}
- Dicyphus botrydis Rieger, 2002^{c g}
- Dicyphus brachypterus Knight, 1943^{i}
- Dicyphus californicus (Stål, 1859)^{i}
- Dicyphus cerastii Wagner, 1951^{c g}
- Dicyphus cerutti Wagner, 1946^{c g}
- Dicyphus confusus Kelton, 1980^{i}
- Dicyphus constrictus (Boheman, 1852)^{c g}
- Dicyphus crudus Van Duzee, 1916^{i}
- Dicyphus deylamanus Linnavuori and Hosseini, 1999^{c g}
- Dicyphus digitalidis Josifov, 1958^{c g}
- Dicyphus diplaci Knight, 1968^{i}
- Dicyphus discrepans Knight, 1923^{i c g b}
- Dicyphus eckerleini Wagner, 1963^{c g}
- Dicyphus elongatus Van Duzee, 1917^{i}
- Dicyphus epilobii Reuter, 1883^{c g}
- Dicyphus errans (Wolff, 1804) - type species
- Dicyphus escalerae Lindberg, 1934^{c g}
- Dicyphus famelicus (Uhler, 1878)^{i c g b}
- Dicyphus fieberi Stichel, 1938^{c g}
- Dicyphus flavoviridis Tamanini, 1949^{c g}
- Dicyphus furcifer Muminov, 1978^{c g}
- Dicyphus geniculatus (Fieber, 1858)^{c g}
- Dicyphus globulifer (Fallen, 1829)^{c g}
- Dicyphus gracilentus Parshley, 1923^{i c g}
- Dicyphus gracilis (Poppius, 1914)^{c}
- Dicyphus heissi Ribes and Baena, 2006^{c g}
- Dicyphus hesperus Knight, 1943^{i c g b}
- Dicyphus hyalinipennis (Burmeister, 1835)^{c g}
- Dicyphus incognitus Neimorovets, 2006^{c g}
- Dicyphus josifovi Rieger, 1995^{c g}
- Dicyphus lindbergi Wagner, 1951^{c g}
- Dicyphus linnavuorii Wagner, 1967^{c g}
- Dicyphus maroccanus Wagner, 1951^{c g}
- Dicyphus martinoi Josifov, 1958^{c g}
- Dicyphus matocqi Ribes and Baena, 2006^{c g}
- Dicyphus melanocerus Reuter, 1901^{c g}
- Dicyphus miyamotoi Yasunaga^{g}
- Dicyphus montandoni Reuter, 1888^{c g}
- Dicyphus nigrifrons Reuter, 1906^{c g}
- Dicyphus orientalis Reuter, 1879^{c g}
- Dicyphus paddocki Knight, 1968^{i c g}
- Dicyphus pallicornis (Fieber, 1861)^{i c g}
- Dicyphus pallidus (Herrich-Schaeffer, 1836)^{i c g}
- Dicyphus parkheoni Lee and Kerzhner, 1995^{c g}
- Dicyphus pauxillus Muminov, 1978^{c g}
- Dicyphus peruanus Carvalho and Melendez, 1986^{c g}
- Dicyphus phaceliae Knight, 1968^{i}
- Dicyphus poneli Matocq and Ribes, 2004^{c g}
- Dicyphus regulus (Distant, 1909)^{c g}
- Dicyphus rhododendri Dolling, 1972^{i}
- Dicyphus ribesi Knight, 1968^{i}
- Dicyphus rivalis Knight, 1943^{i}
- Dicyphus rubi Knight, 1968^{i}
- Dicyphus rubicundus Blöte, 1929^{c g}
- Dicyphus rubusensis Penalver and Baena, 2000^{c g}
- Dicyphus rufescens Van Duzee, 1917^{i}
- Dicyphus sedilloti Puton, 1886^{c g}
- Dicyphus seleucus Seidenstucker, 1969^{c g}
- Dicyphus sengge Hutchinson, 1934^{c g}
- Dicyphus similis Kelton, 1980^{i}
- Dicyphus stachydis J. Sahlberg, 1878^{c g}
- Dicyphus stitti Knight, 1968^{i c g}
- Dicyphus tamaninii Wagner, 1951^{c g}
- Dicyphus testaceus Reuter, 1879^{c g}
- Dicyphus thoracicus Reuter, 1879^{c g}
- Dicyphus tibialis Kelton, 1980^{i}
- Dicyphus tinctus Knight, 1943^{i}
- Dicyphus tumidifrons Ribes, 1997^{c g}
- Dicyphus umbertae Sanchez & Cassis, 2006^{g}
- Dicyphus usingeri Knight, 1943^{i}
- Dicyphus vestitus Uhler, 1895^{i c g}

Data sources: i = ITIS, c = Catalogue of Life, g = GBIF, b = Bugguide.net

== Role in ecosystems ==
Majority of mirid bugs species are phytophagous. Some, like D. hesperus, D. hyalinipennis, D. tamanini, by feeding on other insects, display predatory behaviour and are considered beneficial for biological control of crop pests.
