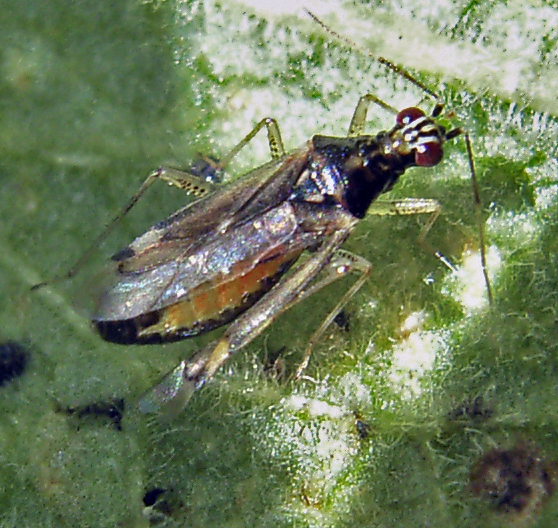
- Dicyphus pallicornis, Germany

Scientific classification
- Kingdom: Animalia
- Phylum: Arthropoda
- Clade: Pancrustacea
- Class: Insecta
- Order: Hemiptera
- Suborder: Heteroptera
- Family: Miridae
- Genus: Dicyphus
- Species: D. pallicornis

Binomial name
- Dicyphus pallicornis (Fieber, 1861)

= Dicyphus pallicornis =

Species of true bug

Dicyphus pallicornis is a Palearctic species of true bug.
