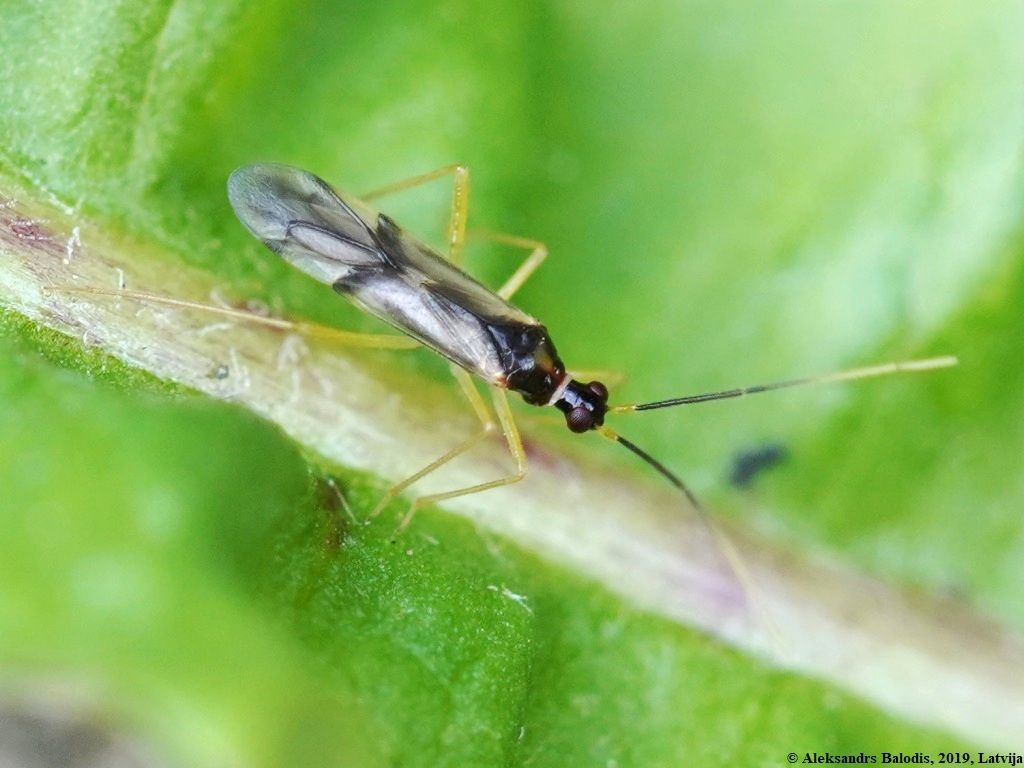

Scientific classification
- Domain: Eukaryota
- Kingdom: Animalia
- Phylum: Arthropoda
- Class: Insecta
- Order: Hemiptera
- Suborder: Heteroptera
- Family: Miridae
- Genus: Tupiocoris
- Species: T. rhododendri

Binomial name
- Tupiocoris rhododendri (Dolling, 1972)

= Tupiocoris rhododendri =

Species of true bug

Tupiocoris rhododendri is a species of bugs in Miridae family that can be found in the United States, and in European countries like Belgium, Germany, United Kingdom, and the Netherlands. The species have black pronotum with brown wings and yellow legs. The species feed exclusively on rhododendron.
