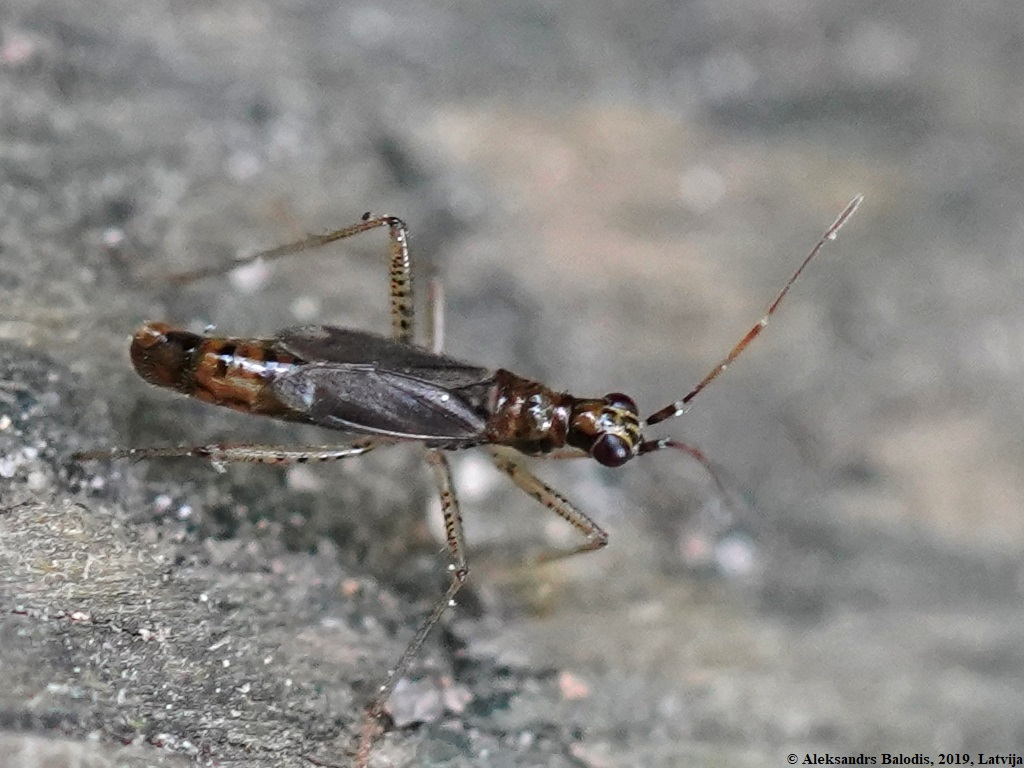
- Dicyphus stachydis Latvia

Scientific classification
- Kingdom: Animalia
- Phylum: Arthropoda
- Clade: Pancrustacea
- Class: Insecta
- Order: Hemiptera
- Suborder: Heteroptera
- Family: Miridae
- Genus: Dicyphus
- Species: D. stachydis

Binomial name
- Dicyphus stachydis J. Sahlberg, 1878

= Dicyphus stachydis =

Species of true bug

Dicyphus stachydis is a Palearctic species of true bug.
