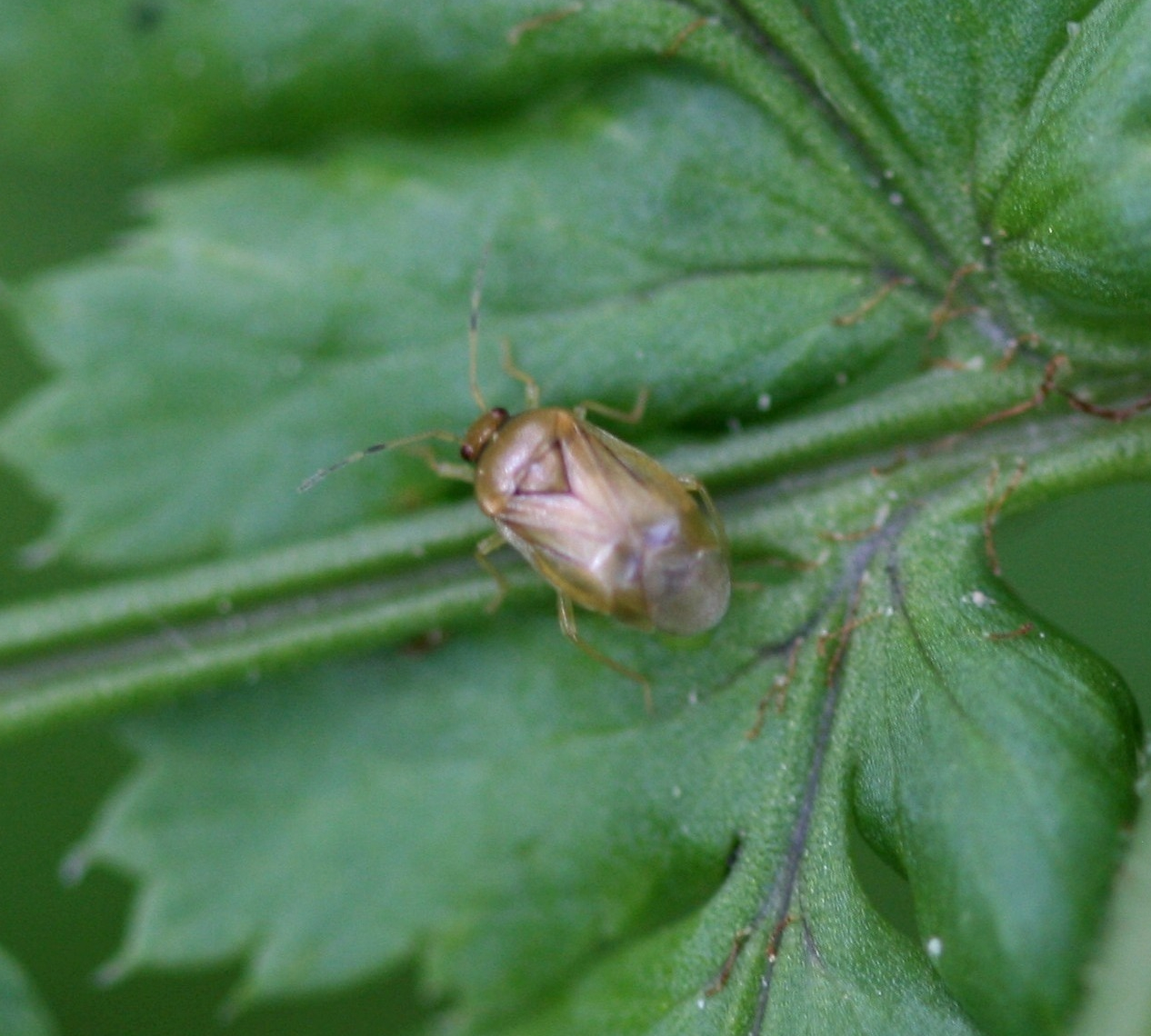
- Monalocoris filicis

Scientific classification
- Kingdom: Animalia
- Phylum: Arthropoda
- Clade: Pancrustacea
- Class: Insecta
- Order: Hemiptera
- Suborder: Heteroptera
- Family: Miridae
- Subfamily: Bryocorinae
- Tribe: Bryocorini
- Genus: Monalocoris; Dahlbom, 1851

= Monalocoris =

Genus of true bugs

Monalocoris is a genus of plant bugs in the family Miridae. There are about 19 described species in Monalocoris.

== Species ==
These 19 species belong to the genus Monalocoris:

- Monalocoris amamianus Yasunaga, 2000
- Monalocoris americanus Wagner & Slater, 1952
- Monalocoris bipunctipennis Walker, 1873
- Monalocoris carioca Carvalho & Gomes, 1971
- Monalocoris eminulus (Distant, 1893)
- Monalocoris filicis (Linnaeus, 1758)
- Monalocoris flaviceps (Poppius, 1915)
- Monalocoris fulviscutellatus Hu & Zheng, 2003
- Monalocoris minutus (Reuter, 1907)
- Monalocoris montanus (Distant, 1913)
- Monalocoris neotropicalis Carvalho & Gomes, 1969
- Monalocoris nigrocollaris Carvalho, 1989
- Monalocoris nigroflavis Hu & Zheng, 2003
- Monalocoris nigrus Carvalho, 1981
- Monalocoris ochraceus Hu & Zheng, 2003
- Monalocoris pallidiceps (Reuter, 1907)
- Monalocoris pallipes Carvalho, 1981
- Monalocoris parvulus (Reuter, 1881)
- Monalocoris punctipennis Linnavuori, 1975
