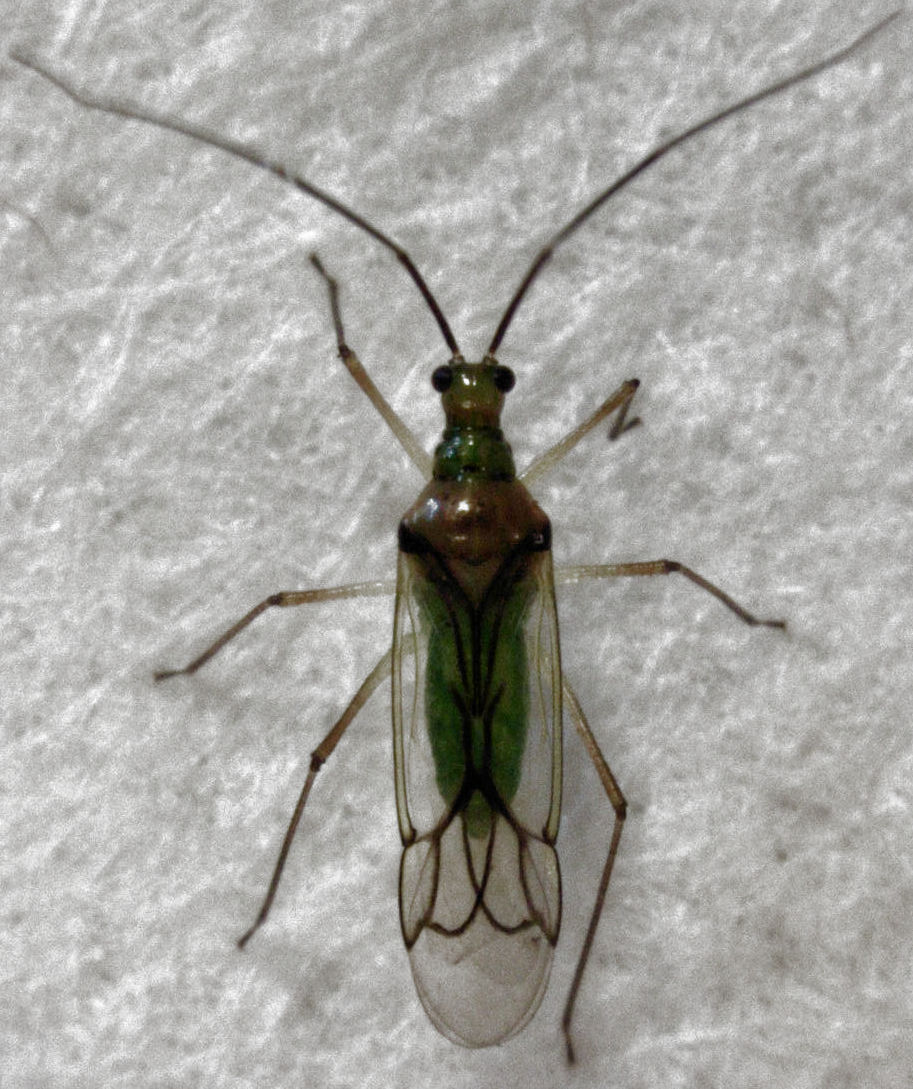
- Felisacus elegantulus

Scientific classification
- Kingdom: Animalia
- Phylum: Arthropoda
- Clade: Pancrustacea
- Class: Insecta
- Order: Hemiptera
- Suborder: Heteroptera
- Family: Miridae
- Subfamily: Bryocorinae
- Tribe: Dicyphini
- Genus: Felisacus; Distant, 1904

Synonyms
- Hyaloscytus Reuter, 1904; Liocoris Motschulsky, 1863

= Felisacus =

Genus of true bugs

Felisacus is a genus of capsid bugs in the tribe Dicyphini (subtribe Monaloniina), erected by William Lucas Distant in 1904. Records of occurrence (probably incomplete) include China, Malesia, Australia, New Zealand and other Pacific islands.

== Species ==
The On-line Systematic Catalogue of Plant Bugs includes:

1. Felisacus adamsi Carvalho, 1956
2. Felisacus amboinae Woodward, 1954
3. Felisacus auritulus Distant, 1913
4. Felisacus bellus Lin, 2000
5. Felisacus capitatus Miyamoto, 1965
6. Felisacus carpenterae Hsiao, 1944
7. Felisacus crassicornis Usinger, 1946
8. Felisacus curvatus Hu and Zheng, 2001
9. Felisacus dauloi Woodward, 1958
10. Felisacus elegantulus (Reuter, 1904)
11. Felisacus filicicola (Kirkaldy, 1908)
12. Felisacus glabratus (Motschulsky, 1863) - type species
13. Felisacus gressitti Miyamoto, 1965
14. Felisacus insularis Miyamoto, 1965
15. Felisacus jacobsoni Poppius, 1914
16. Felisacus longiceps Poppius, 1915
17. Felisacus madagascariensis Poppius, 1912
18. Felisacus magnificus Distant, 1904
19. Felisacus minutus Carvalho, 1981
20. Felisacus nigrescens Carvalho, 1981
21. Felisacus nigricornis Poppius, 1912
22. Felisacus ochraceus Usinger, 1946
23. Felisacus okinawanus Miyamoto, 1965
24. Felisacus philippinensis Hsiao, 1944
25. Felisacus rubricuneus Carvalho, 1956
26. Felisacus usingeri Woodward, 1954
