= Sahlbergella =

Scientific classification
- Domain: Eukaryota
- Kingdom: Animalia
- Phylum: Arthropoda
- Class: Insecta
- Order: Hemiptera
- Suborder: Heteroptera
- Family: Miridae
- Subfamily: Bryocorinae
- Tribe: Dicyphini
- Subtribe: Odoniellina
- Genus: Sahlbergella; Haglund, 1895

Genus of true bugs

Sahlbergella is a genus of African bugs in the family Miridae and tribe Dicyphini (subtribe Odoniellina).

Species are mostly distributed in Africa, where S. singularis is a major insect pest of cacao: causing damage similar to Distantiella in tropical Africa and Helopeltis spp. in SE Asia.

== Species ==
The Global Biodiversity Information Facility lists:

1. Sahlbergella ghesquierei Schouteden, 1935
2. Sahlbergella lais Linnavuori, 1973
3. Sahlbergella maynei Schouteden, 1935
4. Sahlbergella singularis Haglund, 1895 - type species
5. Sahlbergella soror Schouteden, 1935
6. Sahlbergella tai Schmitz, 1987
