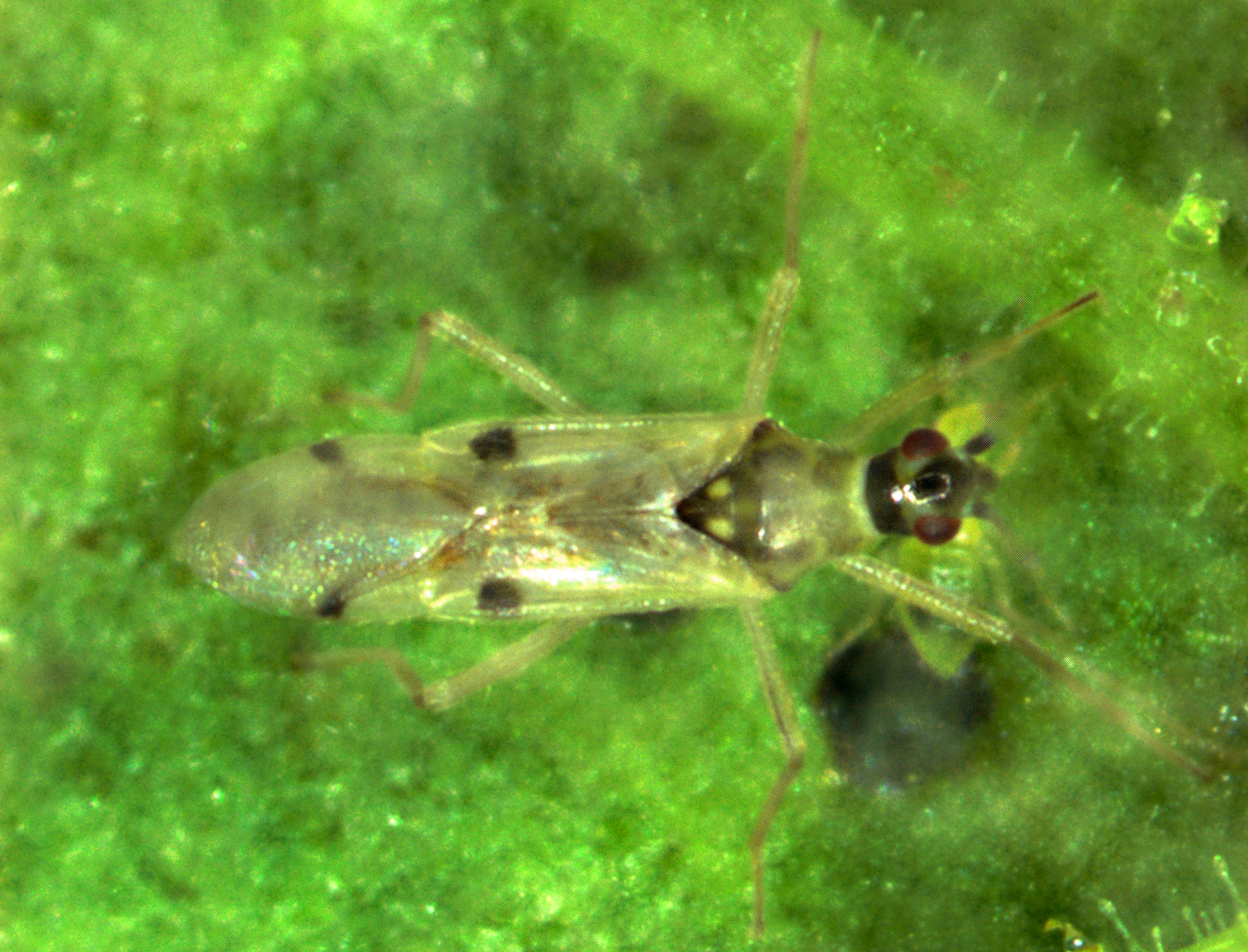
- Tupiocoris notatus adult

Scientific classification
- Kingdom: Animalia
- Phylum: Arthropoda
- Clade: Pancrustacea
- Class: Insecta
- Order: Hemiptera
- Suborder: Heteroptera
- Family: Miridae
- Genus: Tupiocoris
- Species: T. notatus

Binomial name
- Tupiocoris notatus (Distant, 1893)

Synonyms
- Tupiocoris disclusus Van Duzee, 1923; Tupiocoris minimus Quaintance, 1898; Cyrtopeltis notata Distant, 1893

= Tupiocoris notatus =

Species of true bug

Tupiocoris notatus is a sap-sucking bug in the family of Miridae. It feeds on mesophyll cell contents of solanaceous plants like Datura and Nicotiana-species.

== Background ==
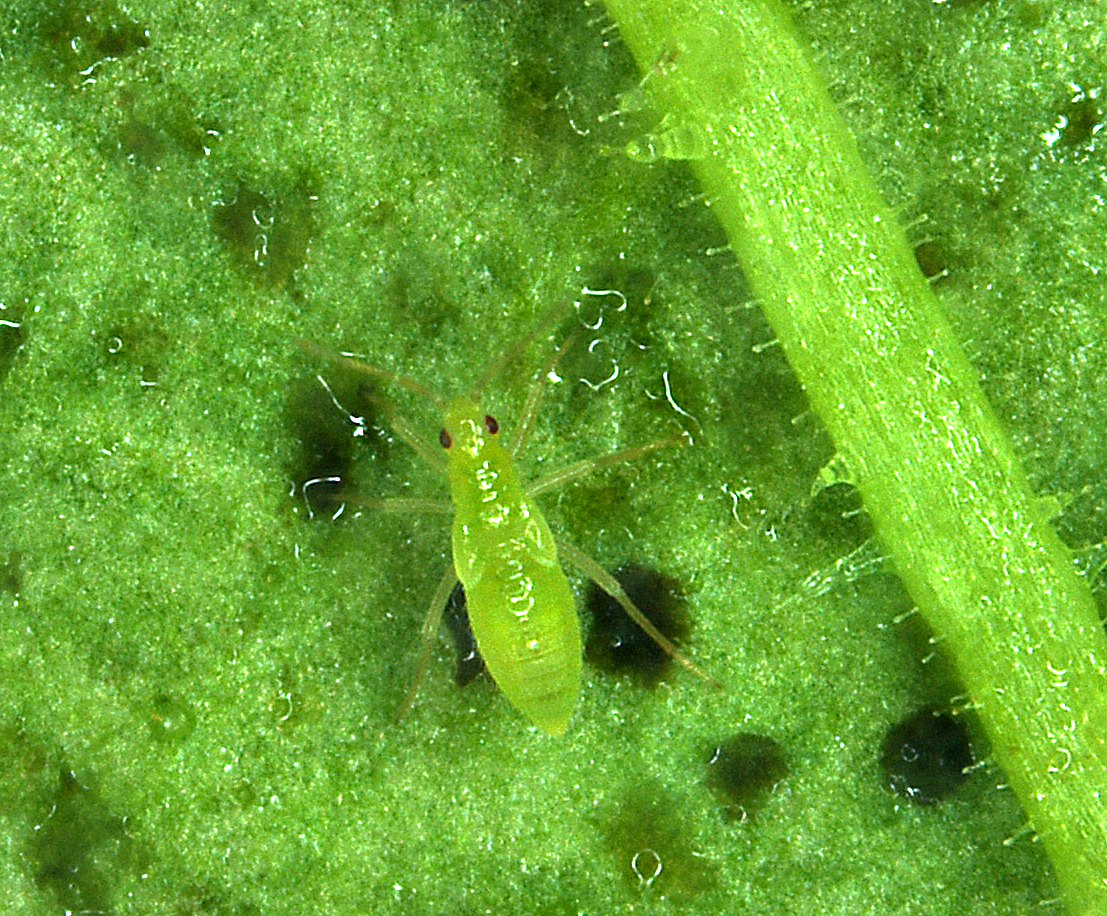
Tupiocoris notatus nymph

The insect is about 2 – 3 mm long and, like all hemipterans, undergoes an incomplete metamorphosis with several nymph stages. It is distributed mainly in the southern continental US and Mexico but also the Caribbean, Middle- and South America. This organism is used in research as a model organism in the field of chemical ecology to study plant-herbivore interactions between this insect and plants like Datura wrightii or the model plant Nicotiana attenuata.
