= Sinevia =

Scientific classification
- Domain: Eukaryota
- Kingdom: Animalia
- Phylum: Arthropoda
- Class: Insecta
- Order: Lepidoptera
- Family: Gelechiidae
- Genus: Sinevia; Omelko in Omelko & Omelko, 1998
- Species: S. temulenta

Binomial name
- Sinevia temulenta Omelko, 1998

Genus of moths

Sinevia is a genus of moth in the family Gelechiidae. It contains the species Sinevia temulenta, which is found in Japan.
