= Spartacus (bug) =

Scientific classification
- Kingdom: Animalia
- Phylum: Arthropoda
- Clade: Pancrustacea
- Class: Insecta
- Order: Hemiptera
- Suborder: Heteroptera
- Family: Miridae
- Genus: Spartacus; Distant, 1884

Genus of insects

Spartacus is a genus of true bugs belonging to the family Miridae.

The species of this genus are found in South America.

== Species ==
- Spartacus albatus Distant, 1884
- Spartacus bifasciatus Carvalho, 1989
- Spartacus bolivianus Carvalho & Gomes, 1971
- Spartacus entrerianus Carvalho & Carpintero, 1986
- Spartacus itatiaiensis Carvalho, 1980
- Spartacus minensis Carvalho, 1985
- Spartacus panamensis Carvalho, 1985
- Spartacus tenuis Carvalho, 1945
