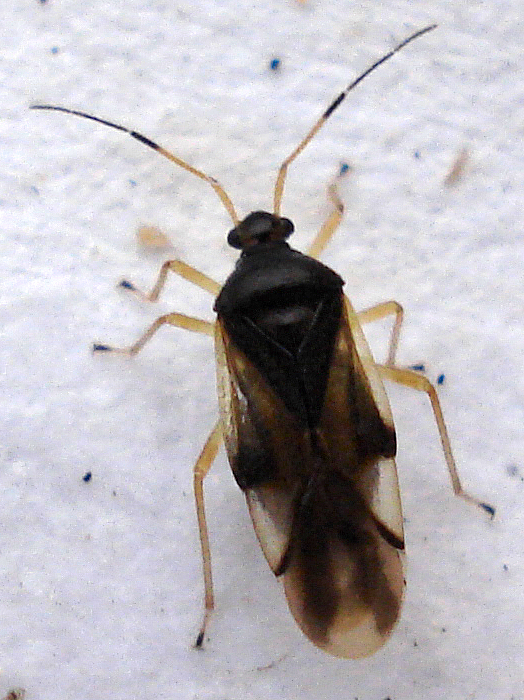
- Bryocoris pteridis

Scientific classification
- Kingdom: Animalia
- Phylum: Arthropoda
- Clade: Pancrustacea
- Class: Insecta
- Order: Hemiptera
- Suborder: Heteroptera
- Family: Miridae
- Genus: Bryocoris
- Species: B. pteridis

Binomial name
- Bryocoris pteridis (Fallén, 1807)

= Bryocoris pteridis =

Species of true bug

Bryocoris pteridis is a true bug in the family Miridae. The species is found in Europe from Ireland in the West and including the northern edge of the Mediterranean and the East across the Palearctic to Siberia.In Central Europe, it is widespread and occurs both in the central uplands and the Alps up to 1500 metres above sea level.

Adults are 2.0 4.0 mm up to in length. They are both fully winged (macropterous) and partially winged (brachypterous).Brachypterous individuals are more common, macropterous forms are mostly males. The head is at least partially dark brown or black and the first segment of the antenna is longer than the width of the head.

The habitat is shaded, moist deciduous forest, especially forests, where the host plants of the species grow. They feed on ferns (Polypodiaceae) mainly Dryopteris, bracken, (Pteridium) and Anthyrium. They suck at fern fronds, carrying sporangia. Overwintering is as an egg. The adult animals occur from June. They mate in July and live until late August/September. Occasionally females can be found in October still. The females lay their eggs individually at the top of the nerves or on the stems of host plants. Occasionally, mature nymphs are found in the second half of September, so that at least some have a second generation per year.
