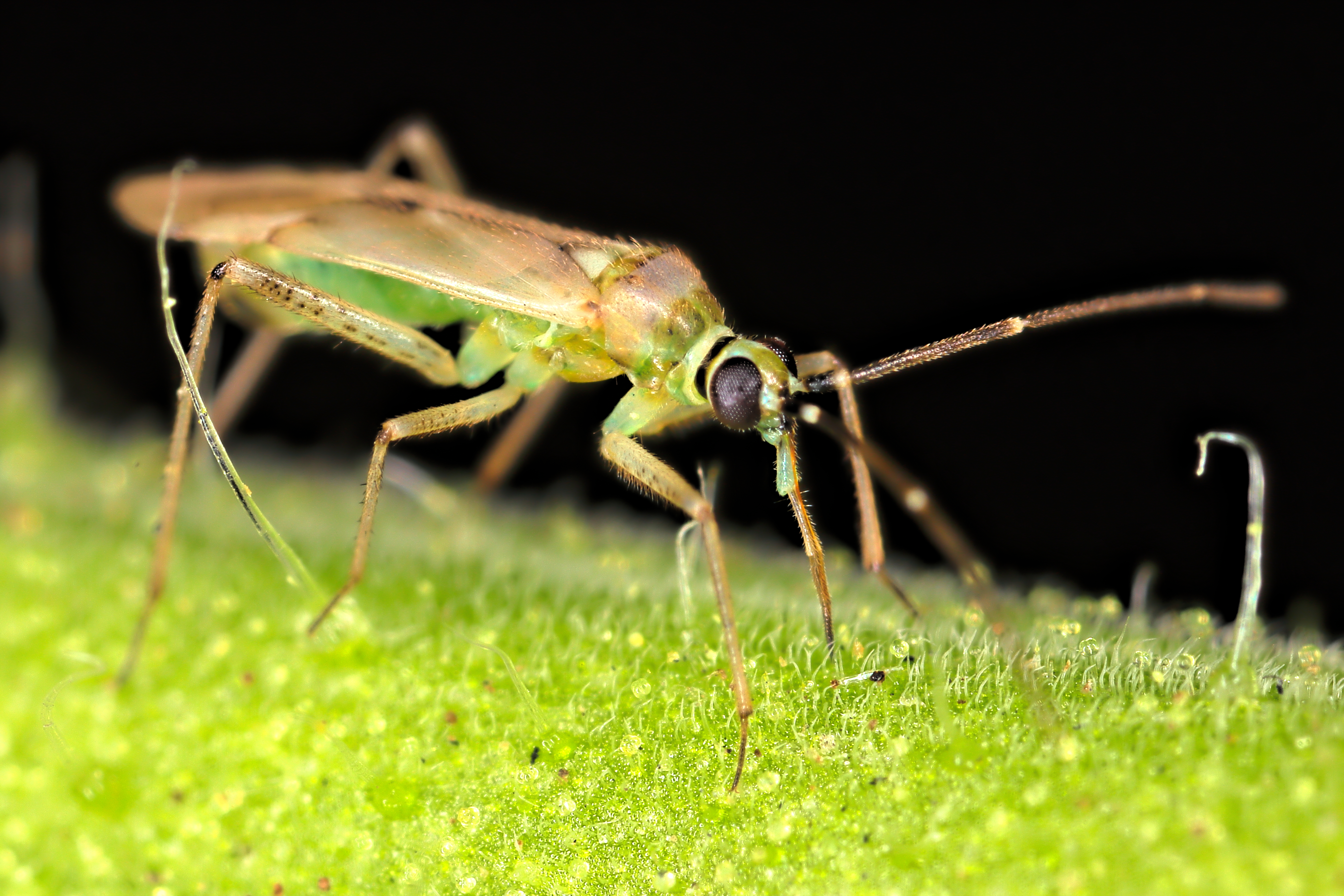

Scientific classification
- Domain: Eukaryota
- Kingdom: Animalia
- Phylum: Arthropoda
- Class: Insecta
- Order: Hemiptera
- Suborder: Heteroptera
- Family: Miridae
- Genus: Engytatus
- Species: E. modestus

Binomial name
- Engytatus modestus (Distant, 1893)

= Engytatus modestus =

Species of true bug

Engytatus modestus, also known as tomato bug, is a species of plant bug in the family Miridae. It is found in the Caribbean Sea, Central America, North America, and South America.

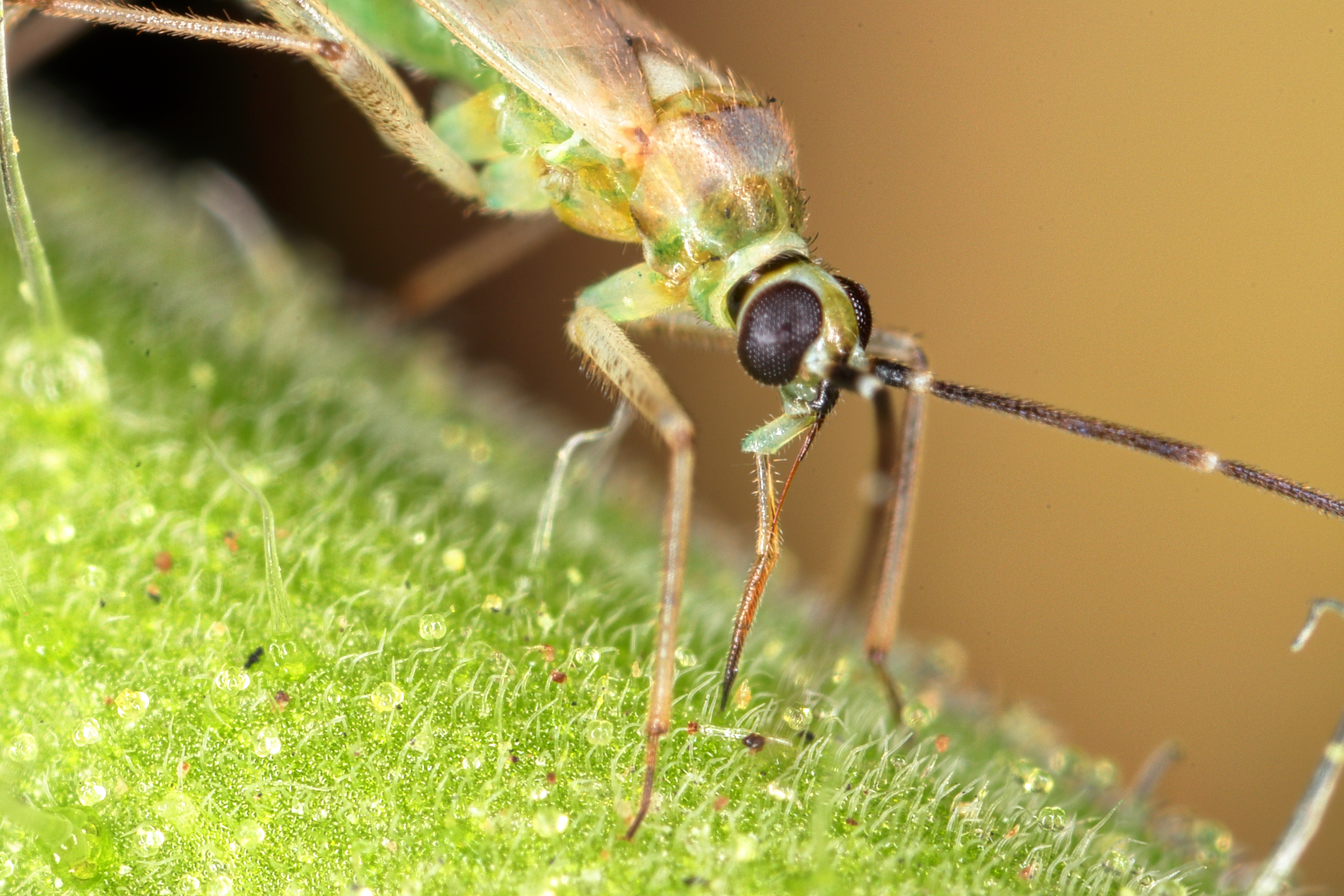
Tomato bug, Engytatus modestus

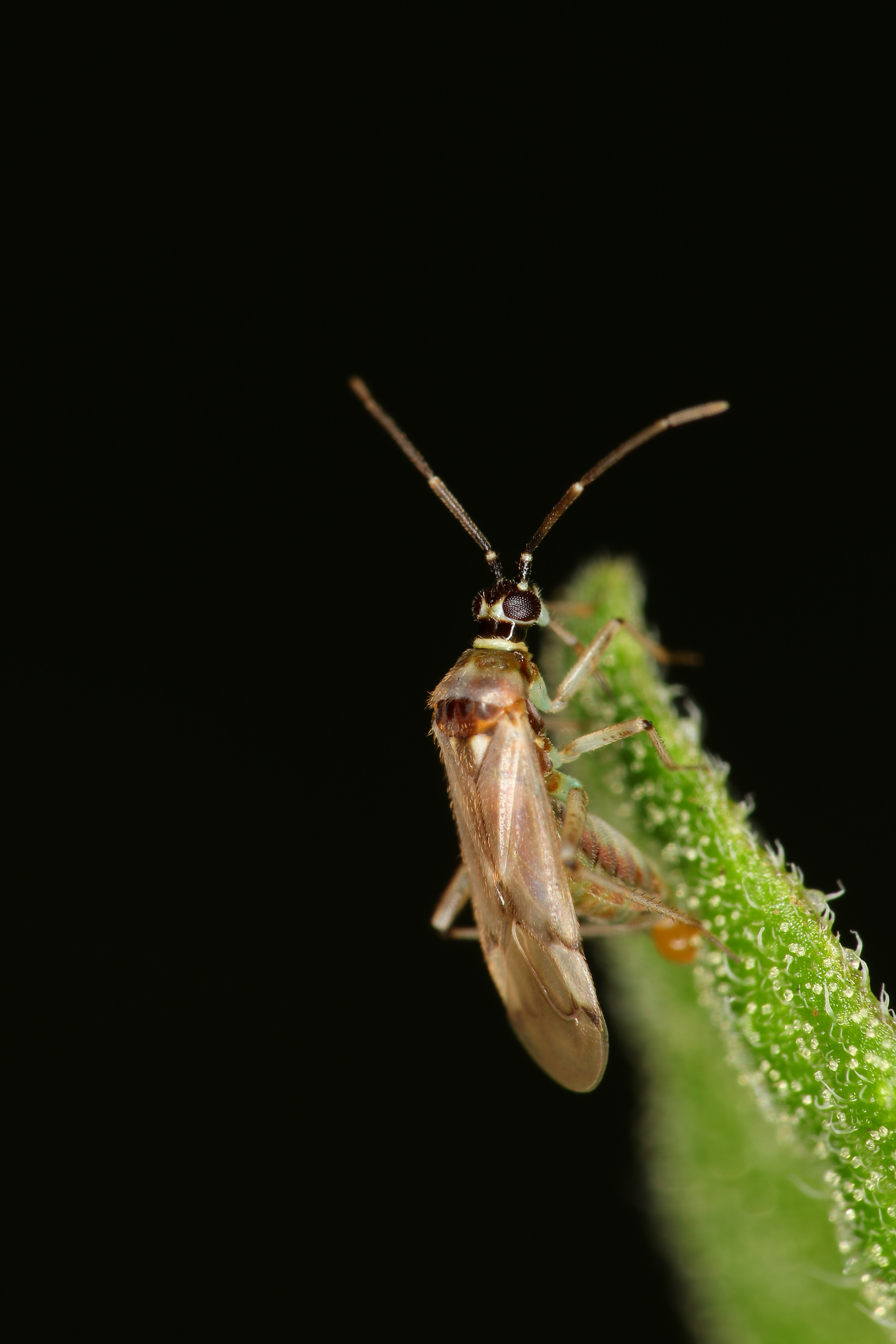
Tomato bug, Engytatus modestus
