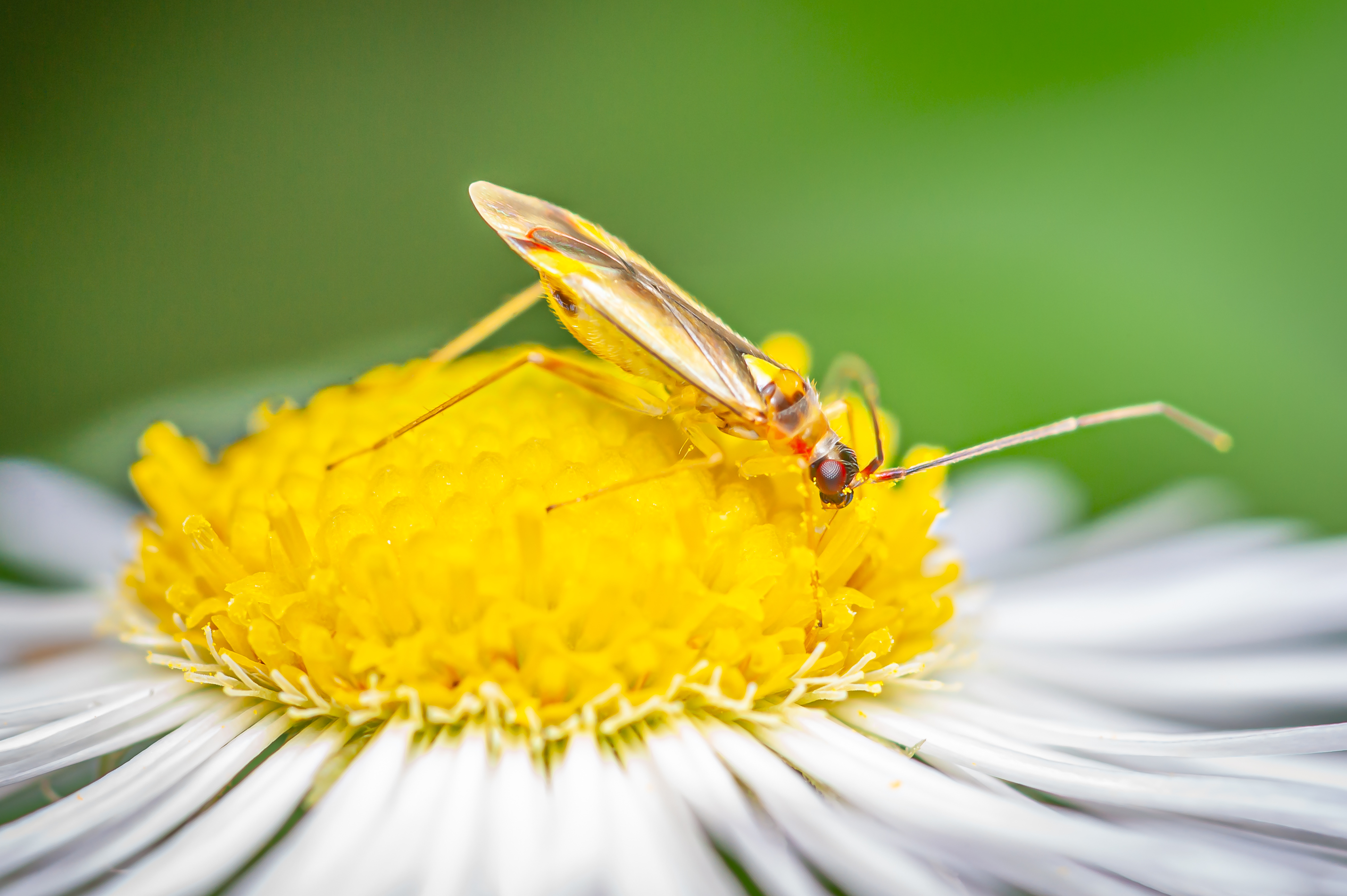
- Female of Campyloneura virgula
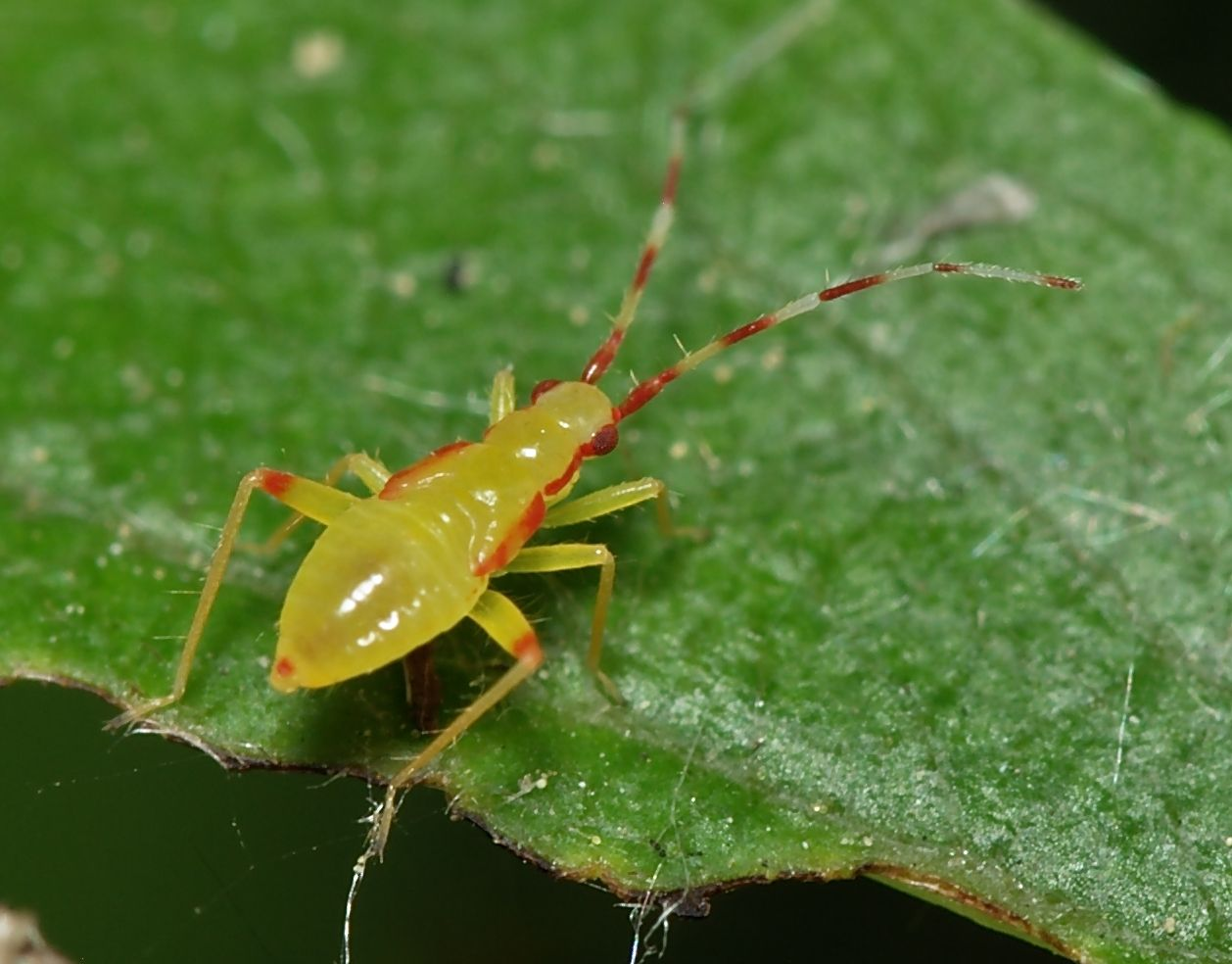
- Nymph of Campyloneura virgula

Scientific classification
- Kingdom: Animalia
- Phylum: Arthropoda
- Class: Insecta
- Order: Hemiptera
- Suborder: Heteroptera
- Family: Miridae
- Genus: Campyloneura
- Species: C. virgula

Binomial name
- Campyloneura virgula (Herrich-Schaeffer, 1835)

Synonyms
- Campyloneura marita Wagner 1968; Campyloneura pulchella Guerin-Meneville 1835

= Campyloneura =

Species of true bug

Campyloneura virgula is a species of bug in Miridae family. It is the only species in the genus Campyloneura Fieber, 1861.

== Description ==
Campyloneura virgula can reach a length of 4–5 millimetres (0.16–0.20 in). Adults have pale translucent hemelytra, a red stripe on the edge of a pale green pronotum, a yellow scutellum, a black head, long red-banded antennae and bright yellow cuneus that are tipped with dark red. Legs are pale yellow. Nymphs are yellow, with a red stripe on the edge of the pronotum.

== Biology and ecology ==
This common predatory bug hunts for small insects, as aphids and red mites. Adults' flight time is from June to October during which they could be found on numerous deciduous trees, including hazel, hawthorn and oak. The adults overwinter and nymphs appear in May.

The peculiarity of this bug is that in almost all of its range males are extremely rare, as C. virgula reproduces without mating (parthenogenesis). This characteristic has an exception in Sicily and in North Africa, where the males are commonly present and the species has a normal sexual reproduction.

== Distribution ==
This species is widespread in the Nearctic realm, in Europe and in the Mediterranean area up to Turkestan. It has been introduced in the United States of America.
