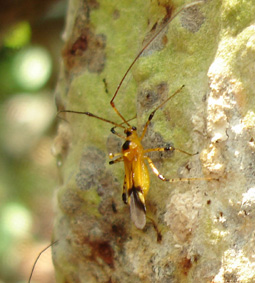
- Helopeltis antonii

Scientific classification
- Domain: Eukaryota
- Kingdom: Animalia
- Phylum: Arthropoda
- Class: Insecta
- Order: Hemiptera
- Suborder: Heteroptera
- Family: Miridae
- Tribe: Dicyphini
- Genus: Helopeltis; Signoret, 1858

Species
- see text

= Helopeltis =

Genus of true bugs

The genus Helopeltis, also sometimes known as mosquito bugs, is a group of heteropterans in the family Miridae (capsid bugs) and tribe Dicyphini. They include pests of various crops, including cacao, cashew, cotton and tea. Now in a different subgenus, or placed in its own genus. A number of Afropeltis species are pests in Africa.

Mosquito bugs have a characteristic spine on the scutellum, which is a diagnostic feature. Classification in the field is based on morphological characteristics, with considerable variations in colouration between insects of the same species (although for example, H. theivora is characteristically green and H. antonii red-brown).

== Damage and distribution ==
With typical Hemipteran sucking mouthparts, they pierce plant tissues and cause damage ranging from leaf tattering and fruit blemishes, to complete death of shoots, branches or whole plants.

There has been evident speciation along the islands of the Malay Archipelago and there may be cryptic species in this genus. Helopeltis spp. sensu stricto are important 'new encounter' pests of SE Asian cocoa including:

- H. antonii: India through to West Irian
- H. bakeri: Malay Peninsula and Philippines
- H. bradyi: Sri Lanka, Malaysia, Indonesia
- H. clavifer: Sabah and Papua New Guinea
- H. collaris: Philippines
- H. sulawesi: Sulawesi
- H. sumatranus: Sumatra
- H. theivora (with H. theobromae as a sub-species): India through to Java

Other cocoa Mirid pest species, very similar to Helopeltis, are the African species which were placed into Afropeltis by Schmitz (1968). These species usually have a lesser pests status than their Asian counterparts, with Sahlbergella singularis and Distantiella theobromae causing greatest cocoa tree and crop damage in Central and West Africa. Monalonion species, belonging to the same tribe, are similarly minor pests of Latin American cocoa.

== Species ==
The Catalogue of life currently (2023) lists:

1. Helopeltis alluaudi Reuter, 1905
2. Helopeltis anacardii Miller, 1954
3. Helopeltis antonii V. Signoret, 1858
4. Helopeltis bakeri Poppius, 1915
5. Helopeltis basilewskyi Schmitz, 1968
6. Helopeltis bergevini Poppius, 1914
7. Helopeltis bergrothi Reuter, 1892
8. Helopeltis bradyi Waterhouse, 1886
9. Helopeltis carayoni Schmitz, 1968
10. Helopeltis cinchonae Mann, 1907
11. Helopeltis clavifer (Walker, 1871)
12. Helopeltis collaris Stal, 1871
13. Helopeltis corbisieri Schmitz, 1968
14. Helopeltis couturieri Schmitz, 1988
15. Helopeltis cuneata Distant, 1903
16. Helopeltis fasciaticollis Poppius, 1915
17. Helopeltis gerini Carayon, 1949
18. Helopeltis ghesquierei Schmitz, 1968
19. Helopeltis hyalospilosus Schmitz, 1988
20. Helopeltis insularis Kirkaldy, 1902
21. Helopeltis labaumei Poppius, 1911
22. Helopeltis lalandei Carayon, 1949
23. Helopeltis lemosi Ghesquiere, 1922
24. Helopeltis maynei Ghesquiere, 1922
25. Helopeltis mayumbensis Ghesquiere, 1922
26. Helopeltis melanescens Schmitz, 1988
27. Helopeltis obscuratus Poppius, 1915
28. Helopeltis orophila Ghesquiere, 1939
29. Helopeltis pellucida Stal, 1871
30. Helopeltis pernicialis Stonedahl et al.2, 1995
31. Helopeltis plebejus Poppius, 1911
32. Helopeltis podagricus (A. Costa, 1864)
33. Helopeltis poppiusi Schmitz, 1968
34. Helopeltis pseudomaynei Schmitz, 1968
35. Helopeltis rauwolfiae Ghesquiere, 1948
36. Helopeltis schoutedeni Reuter, 1906
37. Helopeltis seredensis Schmitz, 1968
38. Helopeltis sulawesi Stonedahl, 1991
39. Helopeltis sumatranus Roepke, 1916
40. Helopeltis theivora Waterhouse, 1886
41. Helopeltis villiersi Delattre, 1947
42. Helopeltis waterhousei Kirkaldy, 1902
43. Helopeltis westwoodii (White, 1842)

=== Afropeltis ===
Entwistle (1972) lists and maps ten species of Afropeltis attacking cocoa:

- the A. bergrothi group:
  - A. bergrothi: widely distributed east of the Niger River
  - A. lalendei (= H. bergevini): very common, Ivory Coast to Nigeria
  - A. serendensis: Ivory Coast and probably Ghana
  - A. corbisieri: humid forest in central Africa
  - A. gerini: southern Cameroun
  - A. mayumbensis: north and east of the Congo River
- A. poppiusi: widespread, but only found on cocoa in Ivory Coast
- A. schoutedeni: the most widespread in tropical Africa
- A. lemosi: São Tomé and Príncipe
- A. westwoodi: widespread in west and central Africa
