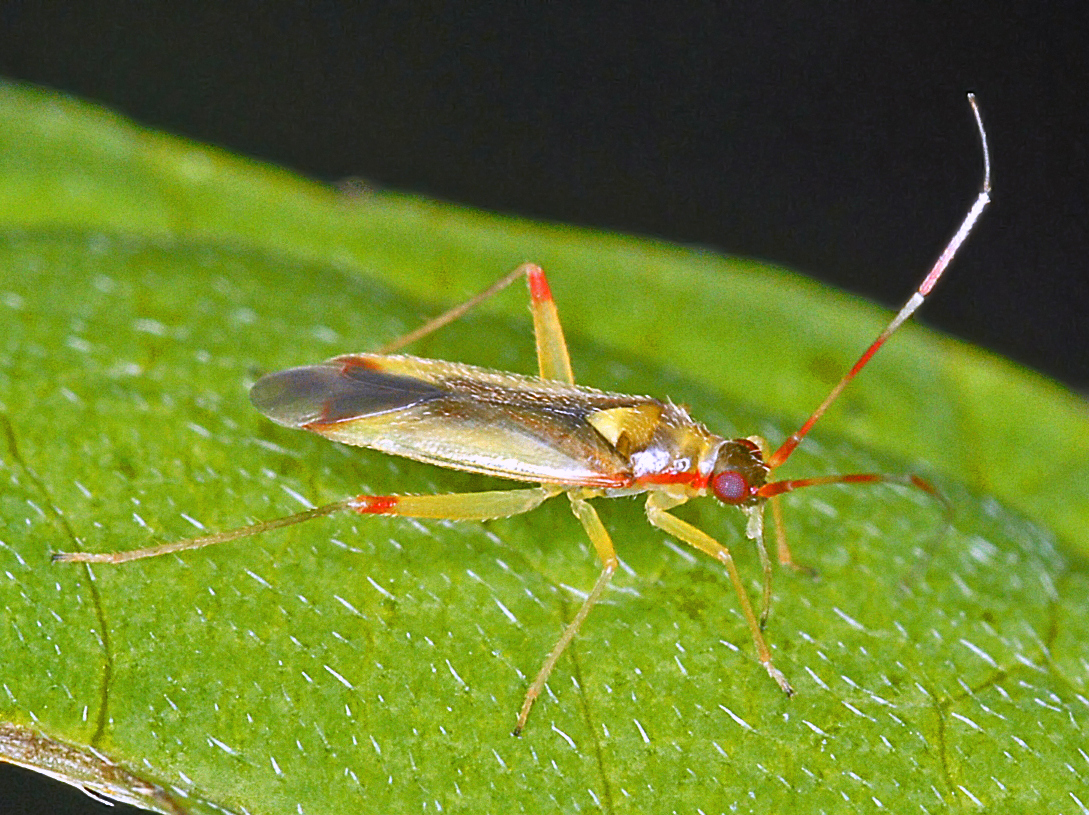
- Female of Campyloneura virgula

Scientific classification
- Kingdom: Animalia
- Phylum: Arthropoda
- Clade: Pancrustacea
- Class: Insecta
- Order: Hemiptera
- Suborder: Heteroptera
- Family: Miridae
- Subfamily: Bryocorinae; Baerensprung, 1860

= Bryocorinae =

Subfamily of true bugs

Bryocorinae is a subfamily of bugs in the family Miridae.

== Tribes and genera ==
BioLib includes:

=== Brycorini ===
Auth: Schuh, 1976

1. Aspidobothrus Reuter, 1907
2. Bromeliaemiris Schumacher, 1919

=== Bryocorini ===
Auth: Baerensprung, 1860

1. Amapafurius Carvalho, 1981
2. Bryocoris Fallén, 1829
3. Bryophilocapsus Yasunaga, 2000
4. Clypeocoris Carvalho, 1989
5. Hekista Kirkaldy, 1902
6. Kunungua Carvalho, 1951
7. Monalocoris Dahlbom, 1851
8. Vitoriacoris Carvalho, 1989

=== Dicyphini ===
Auth.: Reuter, 1883 includes the subtribes: Dicyphina, Monaloniina and Odoniellina; selected genera:

- Campyloneura Fieber, 1861
- Dicyphus Fieber, 1858
- Engytatus Reuter, 1875
- Helopeltis Signoret, 1858
- Monalonion Herrich-Schäffer, 1850
- Distantiella China, 1944
- Odoniella Haglund, 1895
- Sahlbergella Haglund, 1895

=== Eccritotarsini ===
Auth.: Berg, 1884

1. Adneella Carvalho, 1960
2. Ambunticoris Carvalho, 1981
3. Aspidobothrys Reuter, 1907
4. Bothrophorella Reuter, 1907
5. Bryocorellisca Carvalho, 1981
6. Carinimiris Carvalho, 1981
7. Caulotops Bergroth, 1898
8. Crassiembolius Carvalho, 1981
9. Cuneomiris Carvalho, 1981
10. Cyrtocapsus Reuter, 1876
11. Dioclerus Distant, 1910
12. Eccritotarsus Stål, 1860
13. Ernestinus Distant, 1911
14. Eurychilella Reuter, 1908
15. Eurychiloides Carvalho & Gomes, 1971
16. Frontimiris Carvalho, 1981
17. Halticotoma Townsend, 1892
18. Harpedona Distant, 1904
19. Hemisphaerocoris Poppius, 1912
20. Hesperolabops Kirkaldy, 1902
21. Mecolaemus Hsiao, 1947
22. Mertila Distant, 1904
23. Michailocoris Štys, 1985
24. Myiocapsus Poppius, 1914
25. Nabirecoris Carvalho, 1981
26. Neella Reuter, 1908
27. Neocaulotops Carvalho & Gomes, 1971
28. Neofurius Distant, 1884
29. Neoleucon Distant, 1884
30. Neoneella Costa Lima, 1942
31. Pachymerocerista Carvalho & Gomes, 1971
32. Pachymerocerus Reuter, 1909
33. Pachypoda Carvalho & China, 1951
34. Palaeofurius Poppius, 1912
35. Palaucoris Carvalho, 1956
36. Parafurius Carvalho & China, 1951
37. Perissobasis Reuter, 1892
38. Prodromus Distant, 1904
39. Proneella Carvalho, 1960
40. Pycnoderes Guérin-Méneville, 1857
41. Pycnoderiella Henry, 1993
42. Sinervaspartus Henry & Howard, 2016
43. Sinervus Stål, 1860
44. Sinevia Kerzhner, 1988
45. Sixeonotopsis Carvalho & Schaffner, 1974
46. Sixeonotus Reuter, 1876
47. Spartacus Distant, 1884
48. Stenopterocorisca Carvalho, 1981
49. Stictolophus Bergroth, 1922
50. Sysinas Distant, 1883
51. Taricoris Carvalho, 1981
52. Tenthecoris Scott, 1886
53. Thaumastomiris Kirkaldy, 1902

=== Other taxa ===
- The Felisacini, erected by Namyatova, Konstantinov & Cassis, 2016 is monotypic, containing the genus:
  - Felisacus Distant, 1904.
- The Monaloniini Reuter, 1892 and Odoniellini Reuter, 1910 are now subtribes in the Dicyphini
- Genera incertae sedis:
  - Pachyneurhymenus Reuter, 1909
