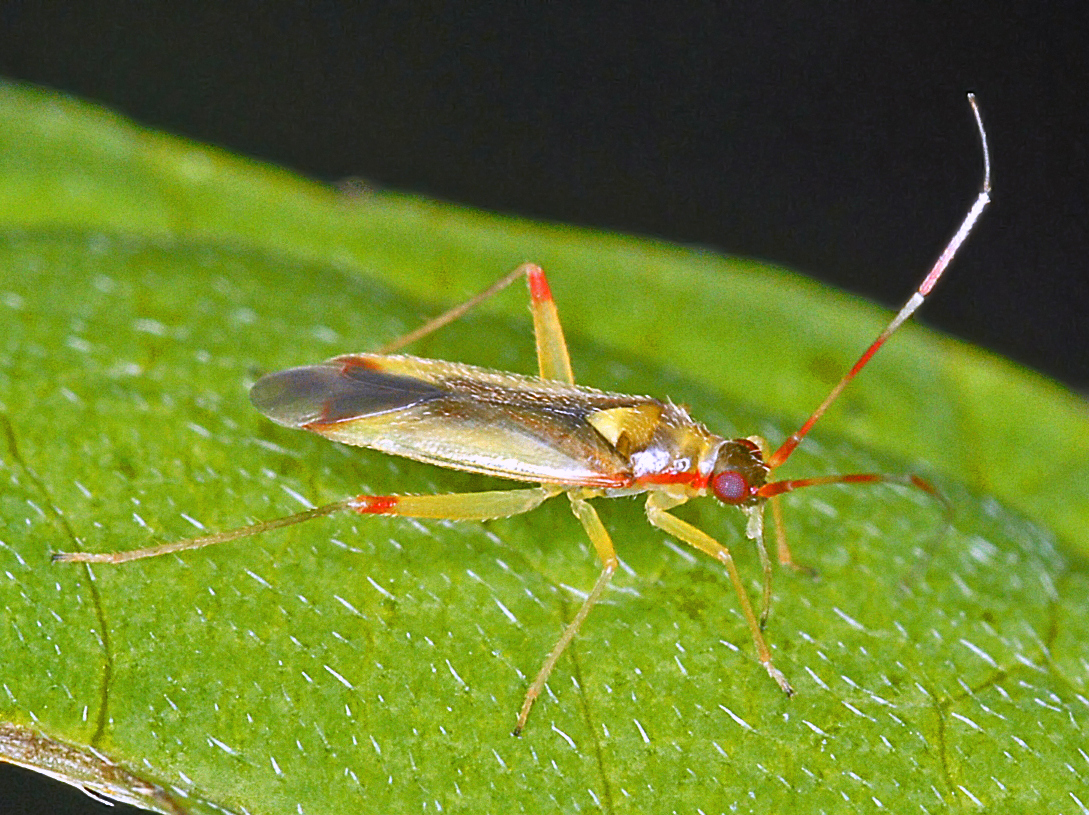
- Female of Campyloneura virgula

Scientific classification
- Kingdom: Animalia
- Phylum: Arthropoda
- Clade: Pancrustacea
- Class: Insecta
- Order: Hemiptera
- Suborder: Heteroptera
- Family: Miridae
- Subfamily: Bryocorinae
- Tribe: Dicyphini; Reuter, 1883

= Dicyphini =

Tribe of insects

Dicyphini is a tribe of bugs in the family Miridae.

== Subtribes and Genera ==
The On-line Systematic Catalogue of Plant Bugs includes:

=== Subtribe Dicyphina ===
1. Campyloneura Fieber, 1861
2. Campyloneuropsis Poppius, 1914
3. Chius monotypic C. maculatus Distant, 1884
4. Cychrocapsus Poppius, 1914
5. Cyrtopeltis Fieber, 1860
6. Dicyphus Fieber, 1858 - type genus
7. Engytatus Reuter, 1876
8. Haematocapsus Poppius, 1914
9. Isoproba Osborn and Drake, 1915
10. Macrolophus Fieber, 1858
11. Microoculis Carvalho, 1982
12. Muirmiris Carvalho, 1983
13. Nesidiocoris Kirkaldy, 1902
14. Pameridea Reuter, 1907
15. Setocoris China and Carvalho, 1951
16. Singhalesia China and Carvalho, 1952
17. Tupiocoris China and Carvalho, 1952
18. Usingerella China & Carvalho, 1952

=== Subtribe Monaloniina ===
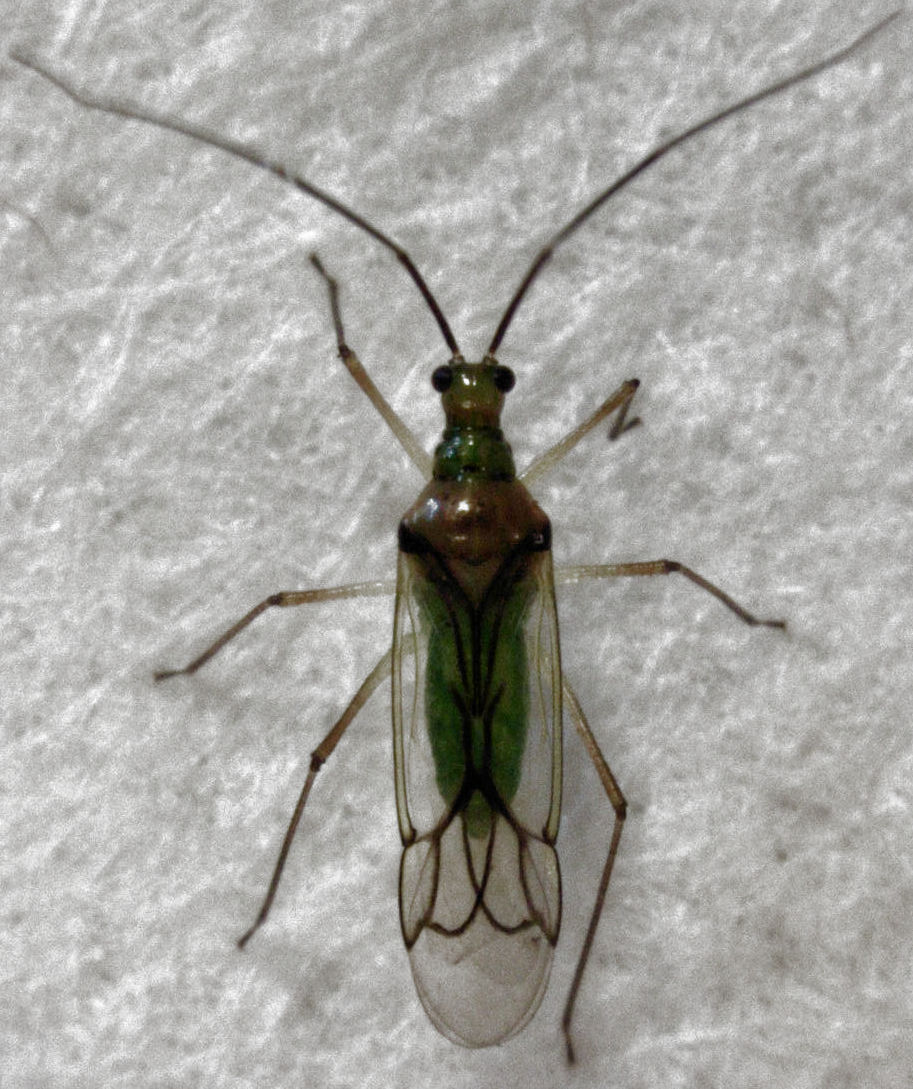
Felisacus elegantulus

1. Arculanus Distant, 1904
2. Arthriticus Bergroth, 1923
3. Dimia Kerzhner, 1988
4. Eucerocoris Westwood, 1837
5. Eupachypeltis Poppius, 1915
6. Felisacoris Carvalho, 1956
7. Felisacus Distant, 1904
8. Helopeltis V. Signoret, 1858
9. Mansoniella Poppius, 1915
10. Miomonalonion Sailer and Carvalho, 1957
11. Monalonion Herrich-Schaeffer, 1850
12. Onconotellus Knight, 1935
13. Pachypeltis V. Signoret, 1858
14. Pachypeltopsis Poppius, 1912
15. Parapachypeltis Hu and Zheng, 2001
16. Pararculanus Poppius, 1912
17. Physophoroptera Poppius, 1910
18. Physophoropterella Poppius, 1914
19. Poppiusia China, 1944
20. Ragwelellus Odhiambo, 1962
21. Rayieria Odhiambo, 1962
22. Schuhirandella Namyatova & Cassis, 2012

=== Subtribe Odoniellina ===
1. Boxia China, 1943
2. Boxiopsis Lavabre, 1960
3. Bryocoropsis Schumacher, 1917
4. Chamopsis Reuter and Poppius, 1911
5. Chamus Distant, 1904
6. Distantiella China, 1944
7. Lycidocoris Reuter and Poppius, 1911
8. Mircarvalhoia Kerzhner and Schuh, 1998
9. Odoniella Haglund, 1895
10. Pantilioforma Schumacher, 1917
11. Parachamus Schouteden, 1946
12. Platyngomiriodes Ghauri, 1963
13. Platyngomiris Kirkaldy, 1902
14. Pseudodoniella China and Carvalho, 1951
15. Rhopaliceschatus Reuter, 1903
16. Sahlbergella Haglund, 1895
17. Villiersicoris Delattre, 1951
18. Volkeliopsis Poppius, 1915
19. Volkelius Distant, 1904
20. Yangambia Schouteden, 1942
