= Alexander Livingston =

Alexander Livingston may refer to:

- Alexander Livingston, 5th Lord Livingston (died 1550)
- Alexander Livingston, 1st Earl of Linlithgow (died 1623)
- Alexander Livingston, 2nd Earl of Linlithgow (died 1650)
- Alexander Livingston of Callendar (died 1451)
- Alexander W. Livingston (1821–1898), American horticulturist

== See also ==
- Alexander Livingstone (disambiguation)
