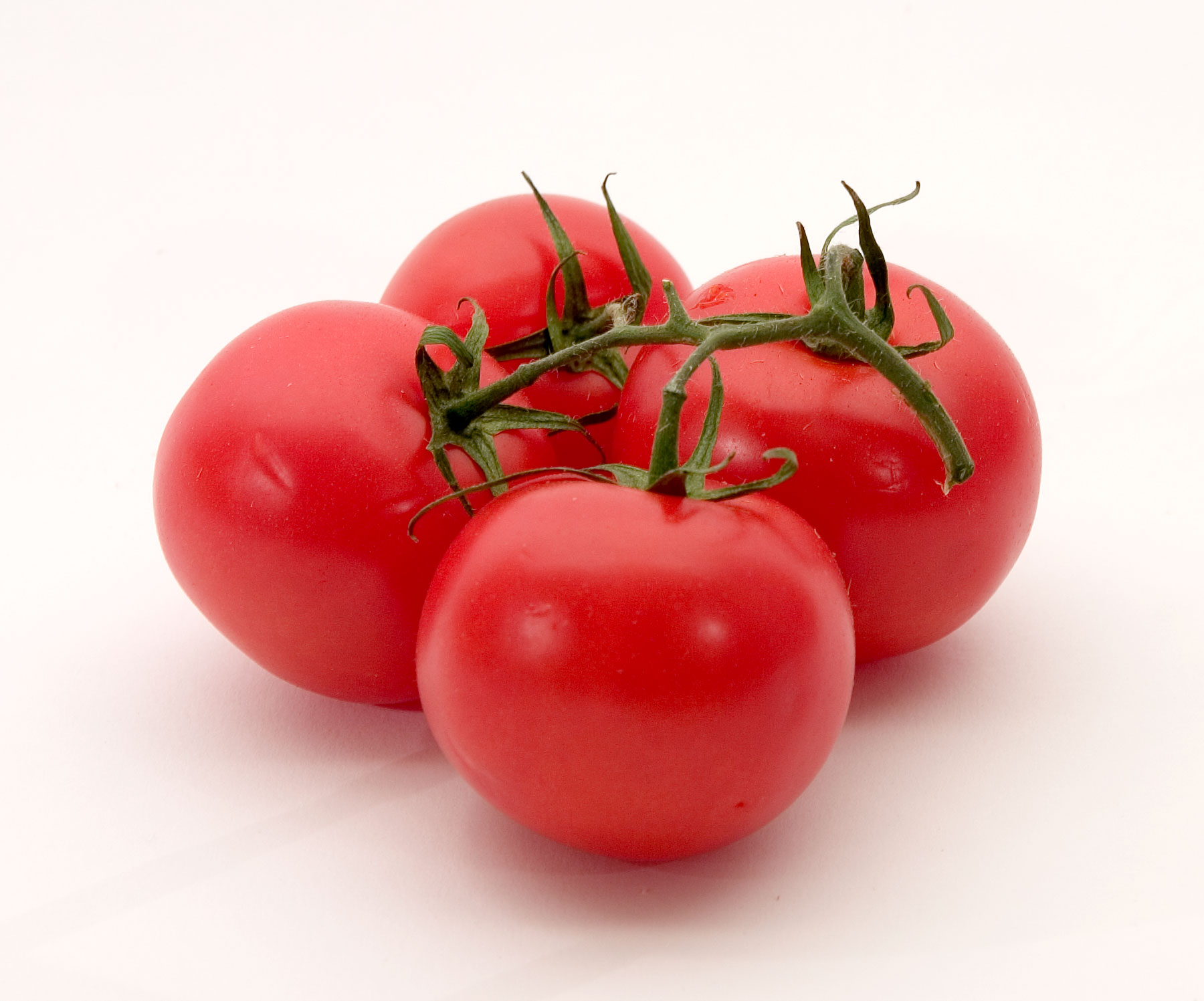

Scientific classification
- Kingdom: Plantae
- Clade: Tracheophytes
- Clade: Angiosperms
- Clade: Eudicots
- Clade: Asterids
- Order: Solanales
- Family: Solanaceae
- Genus: Solanum
- Species: S. lycopersicum

Binomial name
- Solanum lycopersicum L.

Synonyms
- Lycopersicon lycopersicum (L.H. Karst.); Lycopersicon esculentum (Mill.)

= Tomato =

Edible berry

The tomato (US: /təˈmeɪtoʊ/, UK: /təˈmɑːtoʊ/; Solanum lycopersicum) is a plant whose fruit is an edible berry that is eaten as a vegetable. The tomato is a member of the nightshade family that includes tobacco, potato, and chili peppers. It originated from western South America, and may have been domesticated there, in Mexico, or in Central America. The Spanish introduced tomatoes to Eurasia in the Columbian exchange in the 16th century.

Tomato plants are vines, largely annual, and vulnerable to frost, though sometimes living longer in greenhouses. The flowers can self-fertilize. Modern varieties have been bred to ripen uniformly red, in a process that has impaired the fruit's sweetness and flavor. There are thousands of cultivars, varying in size, color, shape, and flavor. Tomatoes are attacked by many insect pests and nematodes and are subject to diseases caused by viruses, mildew, and blight fungi.

The tomato has a strong savory umami flavor and is an important ingredient in cuisines around the world. Tomatoes are widely used in sauces for pasta and pizza, in soups such as gazpacho and tomato soup, in salads and condiments like salsa and ketchup, and in various curries. Tomatoes are also consumed as juice and in beverages such as the Bloody Mary cocktail.

== Naming ==
=== Etymology ===
The word tomato comes from the Spanish tomate, which in turn comes from the Nahuatl word tomatl [ˈtomat͡ɬ]. The specific name lycopersicum, meaning 'wolf peach', originated with Galen, who used it to denote a plant that has never been identified. Luigi Anguillara speculated in the 16th century that Galen's lycopersicum might be the tomato, and despite the impossibility of this identification, lycopersicum entered scientific use as a name for the fruit.

=== Pronunciation ===
The usual pronunciations of tomato are /təˈmeɪtoʊ/ (in North American English) and /təˈmɑːtoʊ/ (in British English). The word's dual pronunciations were immortalized in Ira and George Gershwin's 1937 song "Let's Call the Whole Thing Off" ("You like /pəˈteɪtoʊ/ and I like /pəˈtɑːtoʊ/ / You like /təˈmeɪtoʊ/ and I like /təˈmɑːtoʊ/").

== History ==
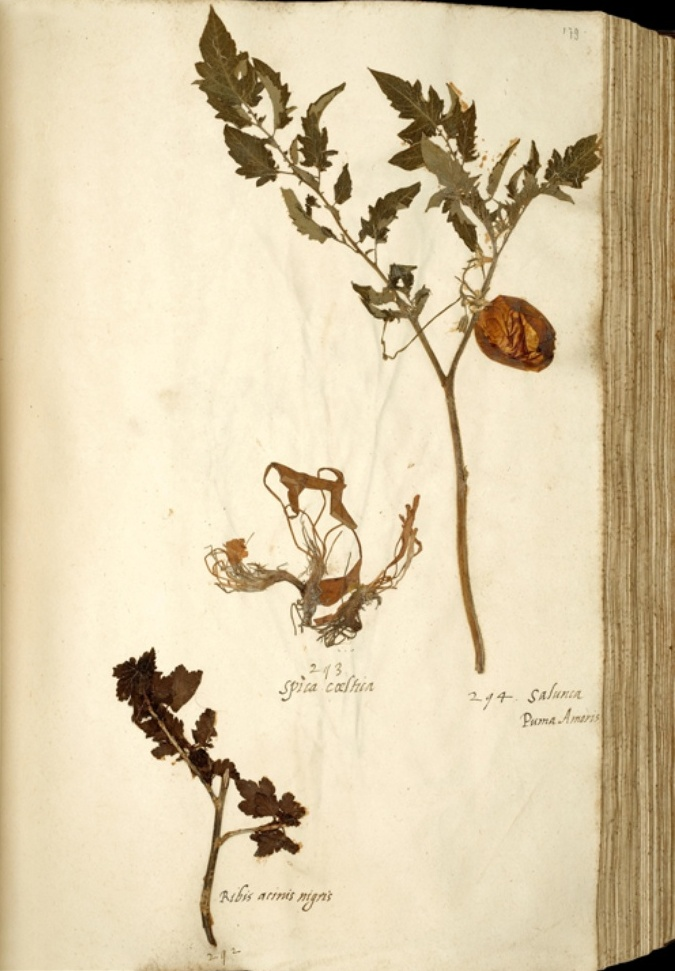
Solanum lycopersicum var. lycopersicum: one of the oldest surviving tomato specimens. Page from the En Tibi Herbarium, 1558. Naturalis Leiden.

The likely wild ancestor of the tomato, the red-fruited Solanum pimpinellifolium, is native to western South America, namely Chile, Peru, and Ecuador. The exact date of domestication is unknown; the site of domestication was either western South America, thought probable by some authorities, or Central America.

The resulting domesticated plant, ancestral to the modern large-fruited tomato varieties, was probably the cherry tomato, S. lycopersicum var. cerasiforme. However, genomic analysis suggests that the domestication process may have been more complex than this. S. lycopersicum var. cerasiforme may have existed before domestication, while traits supposedly typical of domestication may have been reduced in that variety and then reselected (in a case of convergent evolution) in the cultivated tomato. The analysis predicts that var. cerasiforme appeared around 78,000 years ago, while the cultivated tomato originated around 7,000 years ago (5,000 BCE), with substantial uncertainty, making it unclear how humans may have been involved in the process.

The Spanish first introduced tomatoes to Europe, where they became used in Spanish food. Elsewhere in Europe, its first use was ornamental, not least because it was understood to be related to the nightshades and assumed to be poisonous.

=== Mesoamerica ===
By 500 BCE, it was already being cultivated in southern Mexico and probably other areas. A large, lumpy variety of tomato, a mutation from a smoother, smaller fruit, originated in Mesoamerica, and may be the direct ancestor of some modern cultivated tomatoes.

The Aztecs raised several varieties of tomato, with red tomatoes called xitomatl. Bernardino de Sahagún reported seeing a great variety of tomatoes in the Aztec market at Tenochtitlán (Mexico City): "large tomatoes, small tomatoes, leaf tomatoes, sweet tomatoes, large serpent tomatoes, nipple-shaped tomatoes", and tomatoes of all colors from the brightest red to the deepest yellow. Sahagún mentioned Aztecs cooking various sauces, some with tomatoes of different sizes, serving them in city markets: "foods sauces, hot sauces; ... with tomatoes, ... sauce of large tomatoes, sauce of ordinary tomatoes, ..."

=== Spanish distribution ===
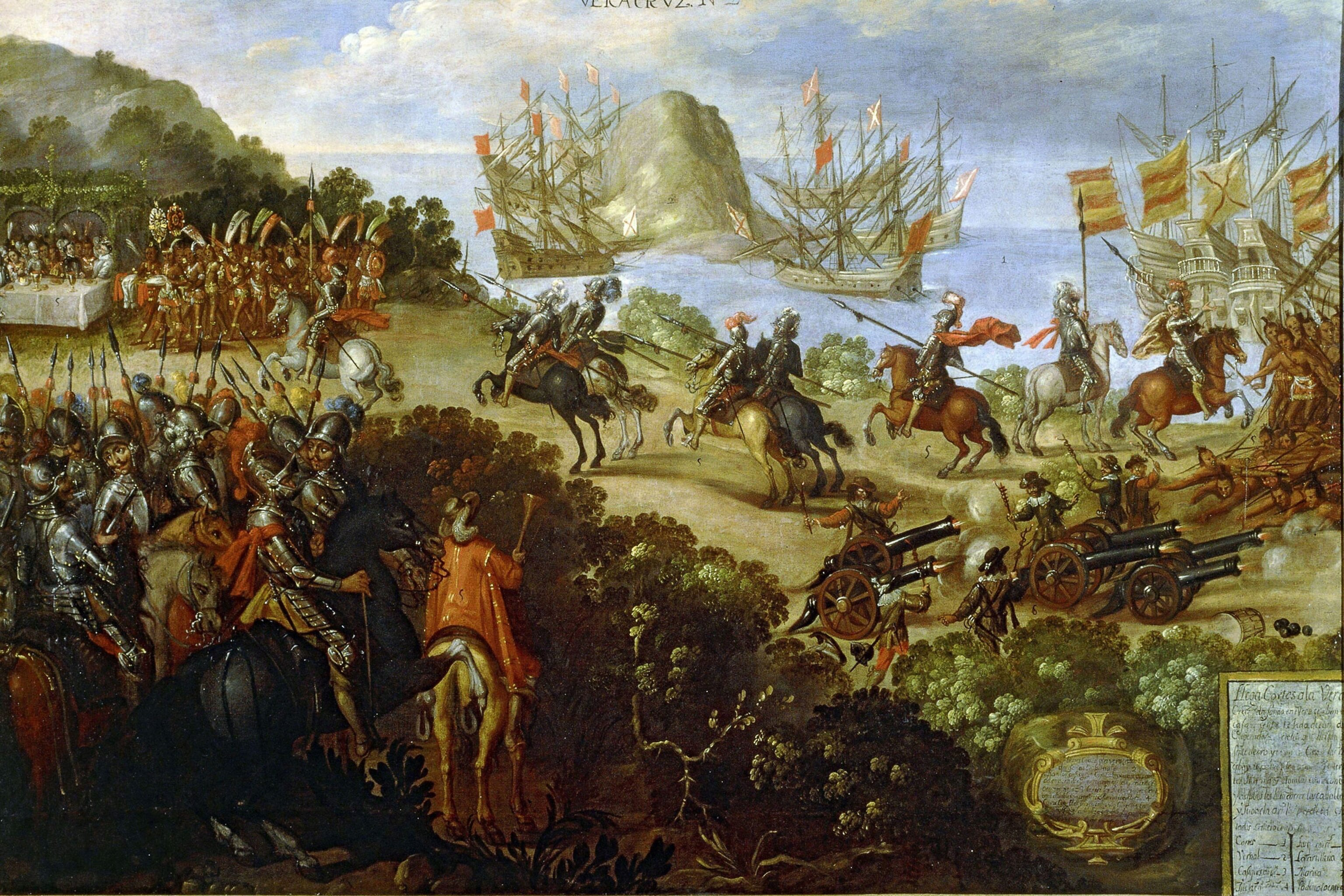
Soon after Hernán Cortés arrived in Mexico (portrayed here) and his conquest of the Aztecs, the tomato was brought to Europe in the Columbian exchange.

The Spanish conquistador Hernán Cortés's capture of Tenochtitlan in 1521 initiated the widespread cultural and biological interchange called the Columbian exchange. The tomato was cultivated in Europe only a few years after that event, by the 1540s, and grew easily in the Mediterranean climates. The earliest mention of the tomato in European literature appeared in Pietro Andrea Mattioli's 1544 herbal. He suggested that a new type of eggplant had been brought to Italy. He stated that it was blood-red or golden in color when mature and could be divided into segments and eaten like an eggplant, that is, cooked and seasoned with salt, black pepper, and oil. Ten years later, Mattioli named the fruits in print as pomi d'oro, or "golden apples".

It was probably eaten shortly after it was introduced, and tomatoes were used as food by the early 17th century in Spain, as documented in the 1618 play La octava maravilla by Lope de Vega with "lovelier than ... a tomato in season".

After the Spanish colonization of the Americas, the Spanish distributed the tomato throughout their colonies in the Caribbean. After they introduced it to the Philippines, it spread to Southeast Asia and then across Asia.

=== China ===
The tomato was introduced to China, likely via the Philippines or Macau, in the 16th century. It was given the name 番茄 fānqié (foreign eggplant), as the Chinese named many foodstuffs introduced from abroad, but referring specifically to early introductions.

=== Italy ===
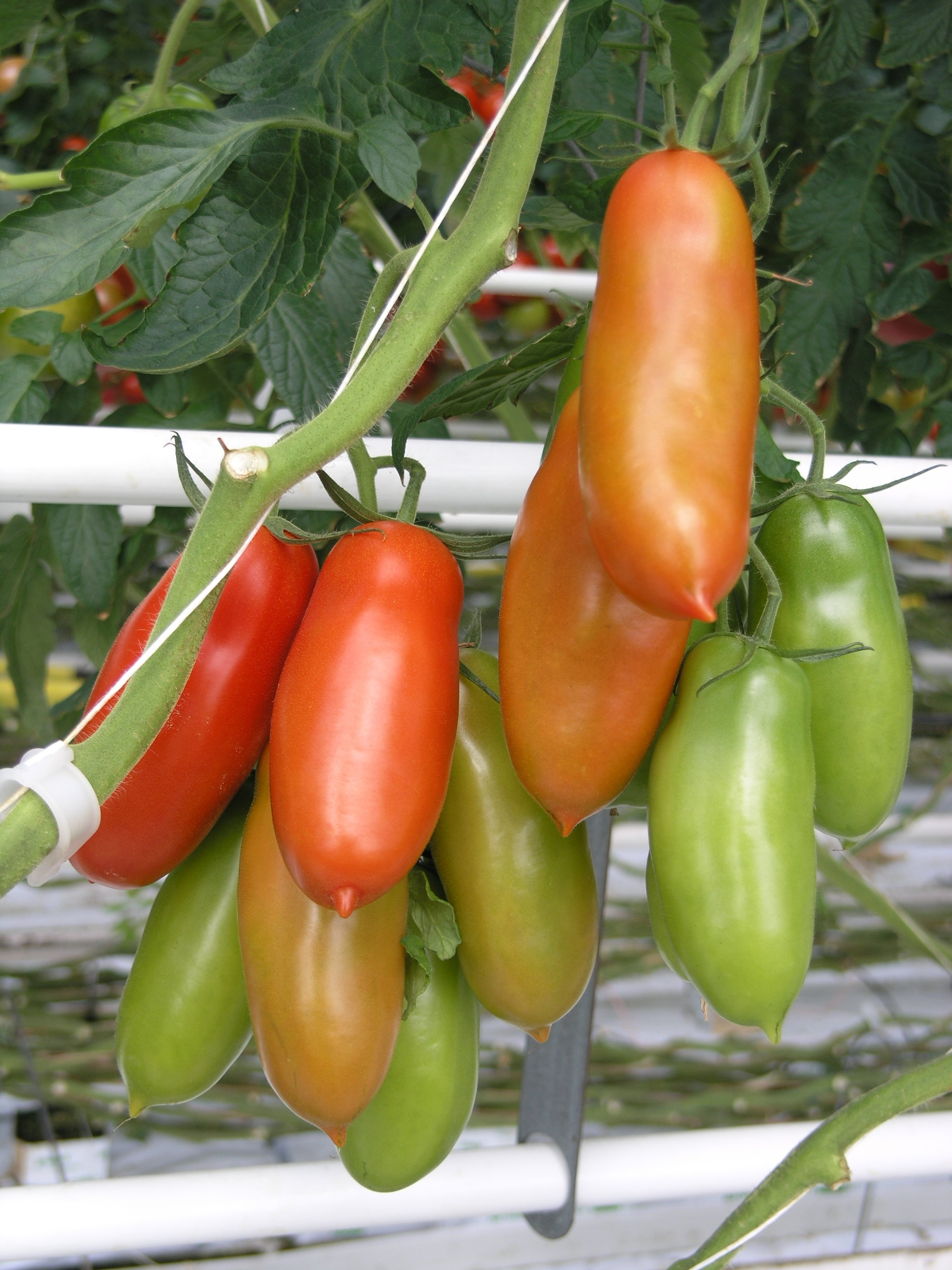
The San Marzano is a well-known plum tomato highly prized for making pizza.

In 1548, the house steward of Cosimo de' Medici, the grand duke of Tuscany, wrote to the Medici private secretary informing him that the basket of tomatoes sent from the grand duke's Florentine estate at Torre del Gallo "had arrived safely". Tomatoes were grown mainly as ornamentals early on after they arrived in Italy. For example, the Florentine aristocrat Giovanvettorio Soderini wrote how they "were to be sought only for their beauty", and were grown only in gardens or flower beds. The tomato's ability to mutate and create new and different varieties helped contribute to its success and spread throughout Italy. However, in areas where the climate supported growing tomatoes, their habit of growing close to the ground suggested low status. They were not adopted as a staple of the peasant population because they were not as filling as other crops. Additionally, both toxic and inedible varieties discouraged many people from attempting to consume or prepare any other varieties. In certain areas of Italy, such as Florence, the fruit was used solely as a tabletop decoration until it was incorporated into the local cuisine in the late 17th or early 18th century. The earliest discovered cookbook with tomato recipes was published in Naples in 1692, though the author had apparently obtained these recipes from Spanish sources.

Varieties were developed over the following centuries for drying, for sauce, for pizzas, and for long-term storage. These varieties are usually known for their place of origin as much as by a variety name. For example, there is the Pomodorino del Piennolo del Vesuvio, the "hanging tomato of Vesuvius", and the well-known and highly prized San Marzano tomato grown in that region, with a European protected designation of origin certification.

=== Britain ===
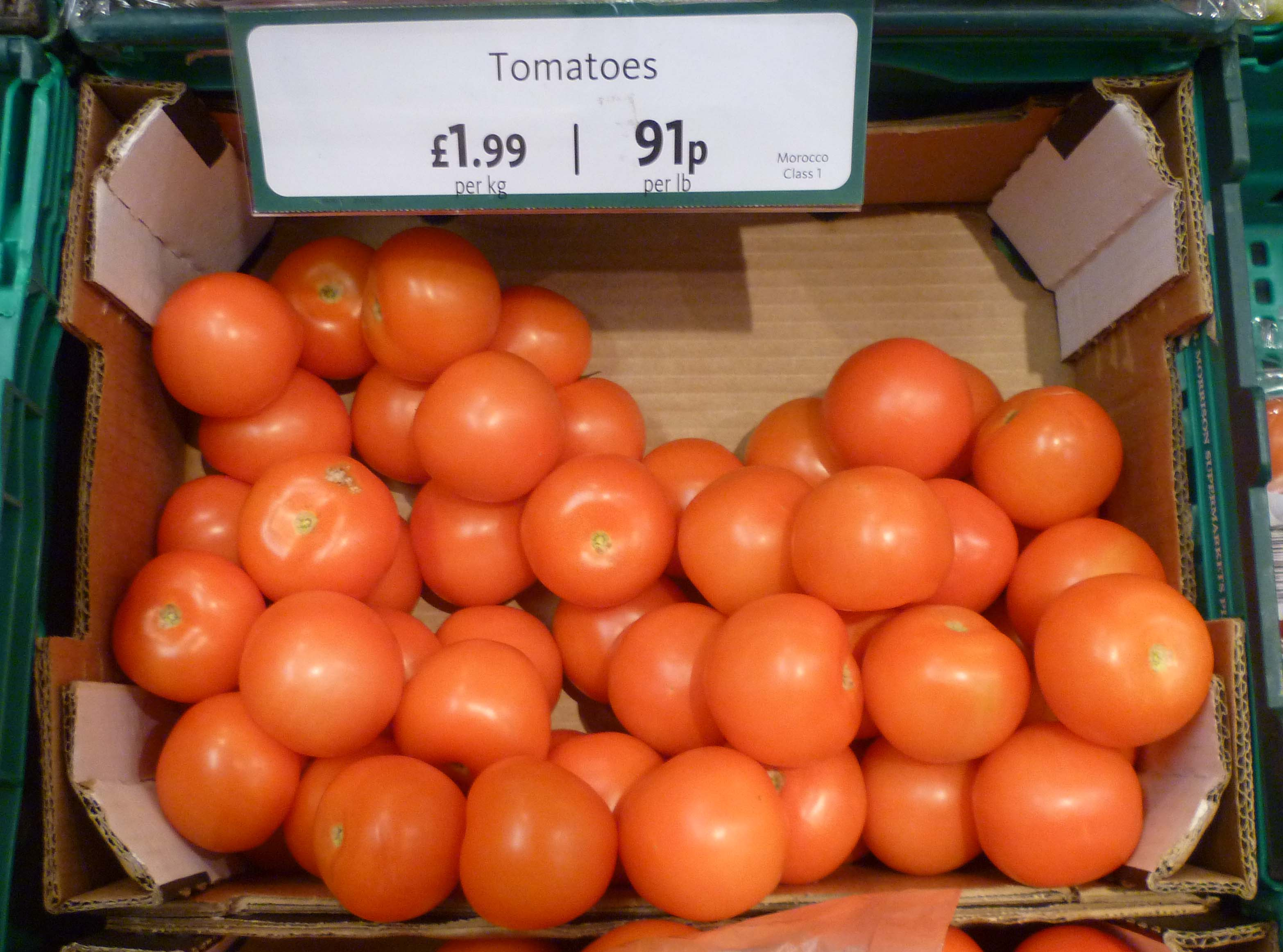
Tomatoes for sale in a UK supermarket

Tomatoes were not grown in England until the 1590s. One of the earliest cultivators was John Gerard, a barber-surgeon. Gerard's Herbal, published in 1597, and largely plagiarized from continental sources, is also one of the earliest discussions of the tomato in England. Gerard knew the tomato was eaten in Spain and Italy. Nonetheless, he believed it was poisonous. Gerard's views were influential, and the tomato was considered unfit for eating for many years in Britain and its North American colonies. By 1820, tomatoes were described as "to be seen in great abundance in all our vegetable markets" and to be "used by all our best cooks", reference was made to their cultivation in gardens still "for the singularity of their appearance", while their use in cooking was associated with exotic Italian or Jewish cuisine. For example, in Elizabeth Blackwell's A Curious Herbal, it is described under the name "Love Apple (Amoris Pomum)" as being consumed with oil and vinegar in Italy, similar to consumption of cucumbers in the UK. In 1963, The New York Times gave an explanation of the name 'Love Apple' as a French misreading of the Italian pomo dei Mori ("the Moors' apple") as pomme d'amour, ("apple of love").

=== Middle East ===
The tomato was introduced to cultivation in the Middle East by John Barker, British consul in Aleppo c. 1799 to 1825.

=== United States ===
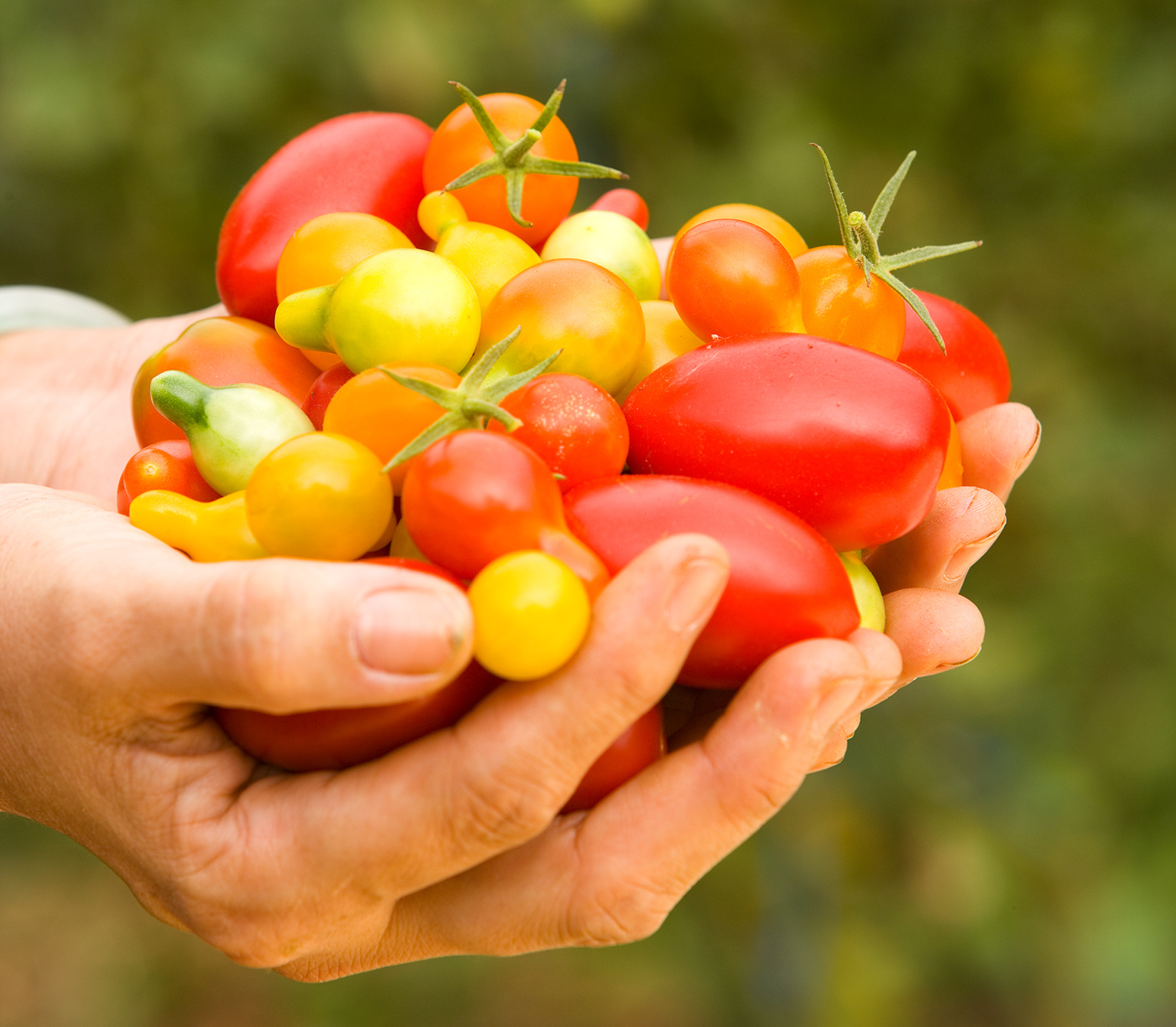
Plum, cherry, and grape varieties in Hawaii.

The earliest reference to tomatoes being grown in British North America is from 1710, when herbalist William Salmon saw them in what is today South Carolina, perhaps introduced from the Caribbean. By the mid-18th century, they were cultivated on some Carolina plantations, and probably in other parts of the Southeast. Thomas Jefferson, who ate tomatoes in Paris, sent some seeds back to America. After 1860, it was often claimed that Americans believed that tomatoes were poisonous into the 1820s, but the belief was never widespread.

When Alexander W. Livingston (1821–1898) began developing the tomato as a commercial crop, he had aimed to grow tomatoes smooth in contour, uniform in size, and sweet in flavor. He eventually developed over seventeen varieties. The U.S. Department of Agriculture's 1937 yearbook declared that "half of the major varieties were a result of the abilities of the Livingstons to evaluate and perpetuate superior material in the tomato". Livingston's first breed of tomato, the Paragon, was introduced in 1870. In 1875, he introduced the Acme, said to be in the parentage of most cultivars for the next twenty-five years. Other early breeders included Henry Tilden in Iowa and a Dr. Hand in Baltimore.

Because of the tomato's need for heat and a long growing season, several states in the Sun Belt became major producers, particularly Florida and California. In California, tomatoes are grown under irrigation for both the fresh market and for canning and processing. The University of California, Davis's C.M. Rick Tomato Genetics Resource Center maintains a gene bank of wild relatives, monogenic mutants and genetic stocks. Research on processing tomatoes is also conducted by the California Tomato Research Institute in Escalon, California. In California, growers have used a method of cultivation called dry-farming, especially with Early Girl tomatoes. This technique encourages the plant to send roots deep to find existing moisture.

== Description ==
=== Plant ===
Tomato plants are vines, becoming decumbent, and can grow up to 3 m (9.8 ft); bush varieties are generally no more than 100 cm (3 ft 3 in) tall. They are tender perennials, often grown as annuals.

Tomato plants are dicots. They grow as a series of branching stems, with a terminal bud at the tip that does the actual growing. When the tip eventually stops growing, whether because of pruning or flowering, lateral buds take over and grow into new, fully functional vines. Tomato vines are typically pubescent, meaning covered with fine short hairs. The hairs facilitate the vining process, turning into roots wherever the plant is in contact with the ground and moisture, especially if the vine's connection to its original root has been damaged or severed. The leaves are 10–25 cm (4–10 in) long, odd pinnate, with five to nine leaflets on petioles, each leaflet up to 8 cm (3 in) long, with a serrated margin; both the stem and leaves are densely glandular-hairy.

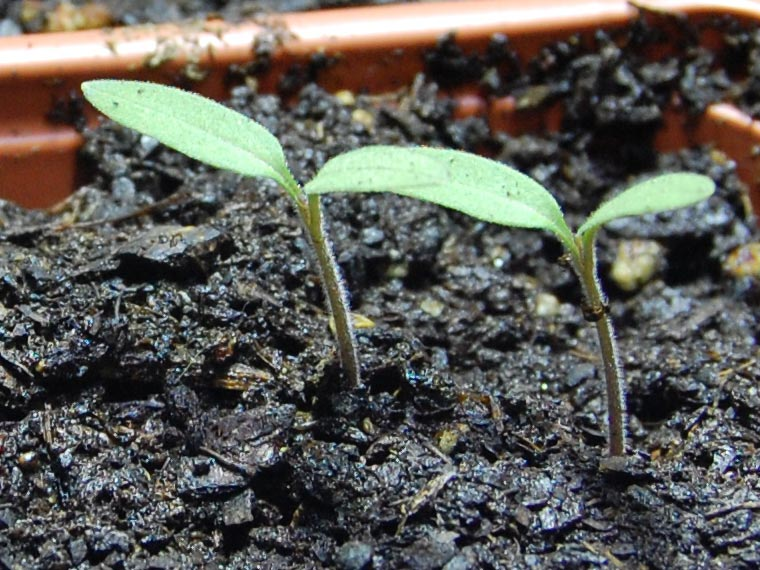
Seedlings 7 days after planting

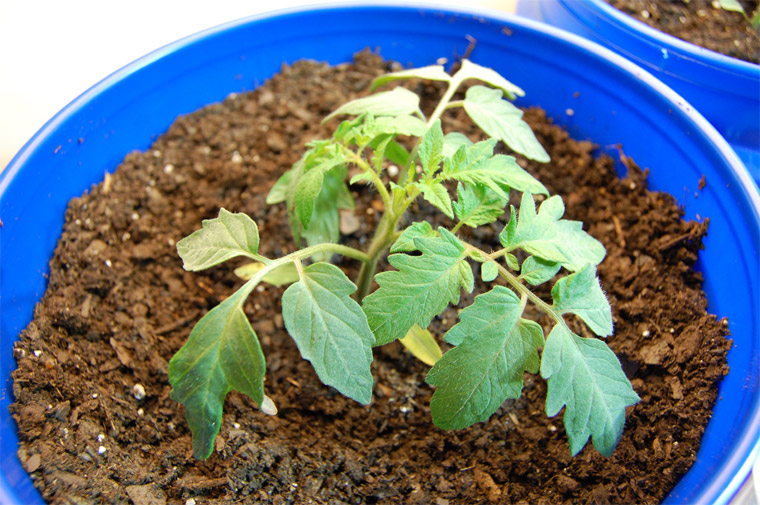
27 days after planting

=== Flower ===
Tomato flowers are bisexual and are able to self-fertilize. As tomatoes were moved from their native areas, their traditional pollinators (probably a species of halictid bee) did not move with them. The trait of self-fertility became an advantage, and domestic cultivars of tomato have been selected to maximize this trait. This is not the same as self-pollination, despite the common claim that tomatoes do so. That tomatoes pollinate themselves poorly without outside aid is clearly shown in greenhouse situations, where pollination must be aided by artificial wind, vibration of the plants, or by cultured bumblebees.

The flowers develop on the apical meristem. They have the anthers fused along the edges, which form a column surrounding the pistil's style. The anthers bend into a cone-like structure, surrounding the stigma. The flowers are 1–2 cm (0.4–0.8 in) across, yellow, with five pointed lobes on the corolla; they are borne in a cyme of three to twelve together.

=== Fruit and seed ===
The fruit develops from the ovary of the plant after fertilization, its flesh comprising the pericarp walls. The fruit contains locules, hollow spaces full of seeds. These vary among cultivated varieties. Some smaller varieties have two locules; globe-shaped varieties typically have three to five; beefsteak tomatoes have a great number of small locules; and plum tomatoes have very few, very small locules. The fruit contains lycopene that produces a red colour when ripe to attract animals that eat and disperse them elsewhere. However, not all tomatoes have same levels of lycopene; so not all of them have the same red colour when they ripe. Yellow tomatoes have levels of delta-carotene and lutein higher than lycopene, orange tomatoes have higher levels of beta-carotene and prolycopene.

For propagation, the seeds need to come from a mature fruit, and must be lightly fermented to remove the gelatinous outer coating and then dried before use. The tomato has a mutualistic relationship with arbuscular mycorrhizal fungi such as Rhizophagus irregularis. Scientists use the tomato as a model species for investigating such symbioses.

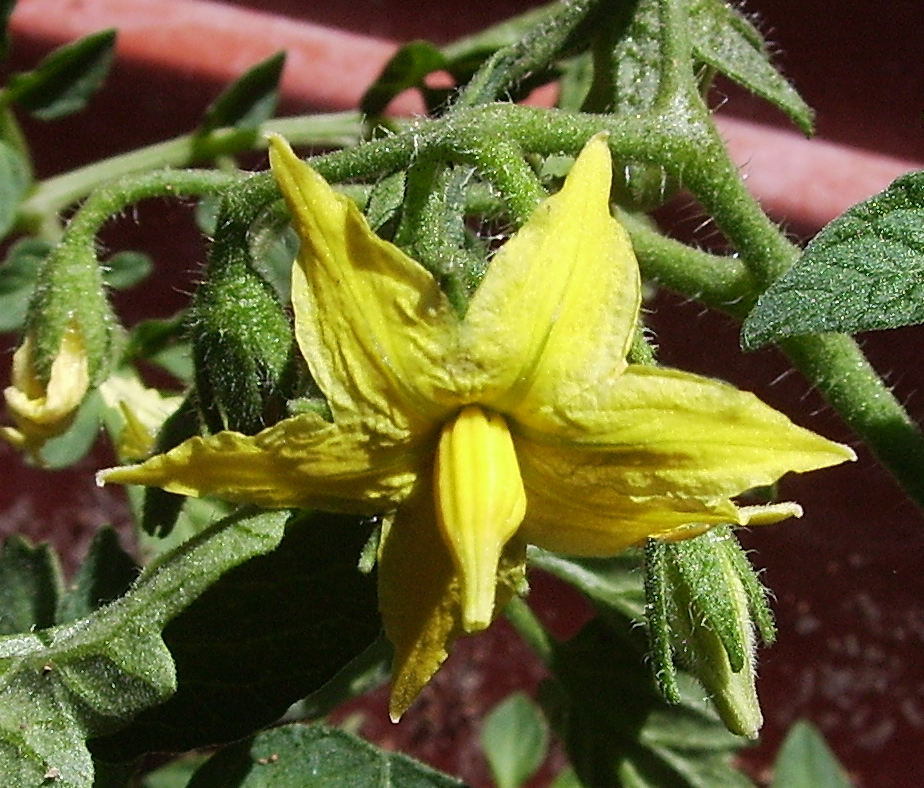
Flower

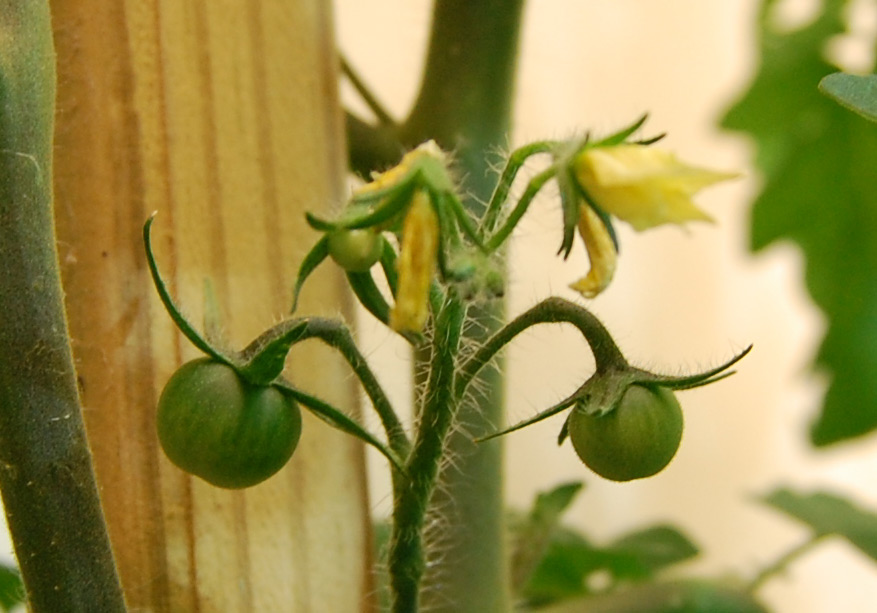
52-day-old plant, first fruits

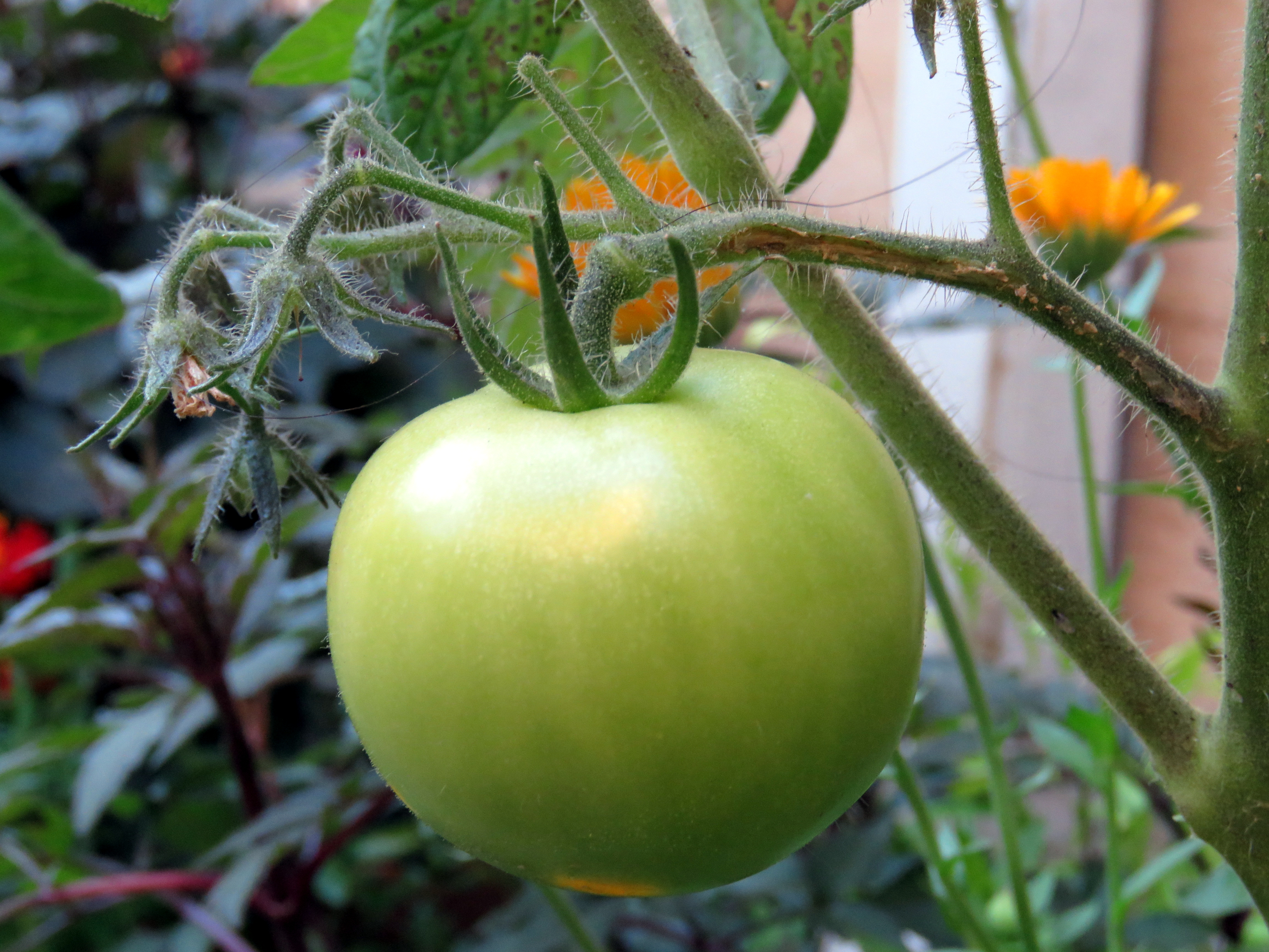
Unripe fruit on the vine

== Phylogeny ==
Like the potato, tomatoes belong to the genus Solanum, which is a member of the nightshade family, the Solanaceae. That is a diverse family of flowering plants, often poisonous, that includes the mandrake (Mandragora), deadly nightshade (Atropa), and tobacco (Nicotiana), as shown in the outline phylogenetic tree (many branches omitted).

- Solanaceae
  - many garden flowers and other species
  - - Nicotiana (tobacco)
    - - Atropa (nightshades)
      - - Mandragora (mandrake)
        - - Capsicum
            (sweet and bell peppers)
          - Solanum
            - S. lycopersicum (tomato)
            - S. tuberosum (potato)

=== Taxonomy ===
In 1753, Linnaeus placed the tomato in the genus Solanum (alongside the potato) as Solanum lycopersicum. In 1768, Philip Miller moved it to its own genus, naming it Lycopersicon esculentum. The name came into wide use, but was technically in breach of the plant naming rules because Linnaeus's species name lycopersicum still had priority. Although the name Lycopersicum lycopersicum was suggested by Karsten (1888), it is not used because it violates the International Code of Nomenclature barring the use of tautonyms in botanical nomenclature. The corrected name Lycopersicon lycopersicum (Nicolson 1974) was technically valid, because Miller's genus name and Linnaeus's species name differ in exact spelling. As Lycopersicon esculentum has become so well known, it was officially listed as a nomen conservandum in 1983, and would be the correct name for the tomato in classifications which do not place the tomato in the genus Solanum.

Genetic evidence shows that Linnaeus was correct to put the tomato in the genus Solanum, making S. lycopersicum the correct name. Both names, however, will probably be found in the literature for some time. Two of the major reasons for considering the genera separate are the leaf structure (tomato leaves are markedly different from any other Solanum), and the biochemistry (many of the alkaloids common to other Solanum species are conspicuously absent from the tomato). On the other hand, hybrids of tomato and diploid potato can be created in the lab by somatic fusion, and are partially fertile, providing evidence of the close relationship between these species. Newer genomic studies have found that the tomato and the potato are very close relatives, forming a tight clade within Solanum. A 2025 study suggests that the potato lineage may have been created by hybridization of a plant from the tomato lineage (not necessarily the modern tomato species) with a plant from the S. etuberosum lineage.

== Plant breeding ==
=== Genetics ===
Genomic information
- NCBI ID: 4081
- Specimen sequenced: Heinz 1706
- Ploidy: haploid
- Genome size: 827.4 Mb
- Number of chromosomes: 12
- Number of genes: 31,217
- Protein-coding: 25,557
- Year of completion: 2018

An international consortium of researchers from 10 countries began sequencing the tomato genome in 2004. A prerelease version of the genome was made available in December 2009. The complete genome for the cultivar Heinz 1706 was published on 31 May 2012 in Nature. The latest reference genome published in 2021 had 799 MB and encodes 34,384 (predicted) proteins, spread over 12 chromosomes.

The first commercially available genetically modified food was a tomato called Flavr Savr, which was engineered to have a longer shelf life. It could be vine ripened without compromising shelf life, which was expected to improve the flavor over ethylene-ripened tomatoes. However, it was not firmer than its unmodified parent, to the disappointment of its creators, who originally wanted to create a vine-ripened tomato that could survive machine-picking. The parent variety was also subpar in terms of yields. As a result, the product was not commercially successful, and was sold only until 1997.

When the Mesoamericans domesticated tomatoes, they selected for less bitter fruits. This corresponded to the increased activity of a 2-oxoglutarate-dependent dioxygenase called 23DOX (synonym GAME31) during fruit ripening, which converts the bitter and slightly toxic α-tomatine into hydroxytomatine, which is eventually converted into the non-bitter and non-toxic esculeoside A.

=== Commercial breeding ===
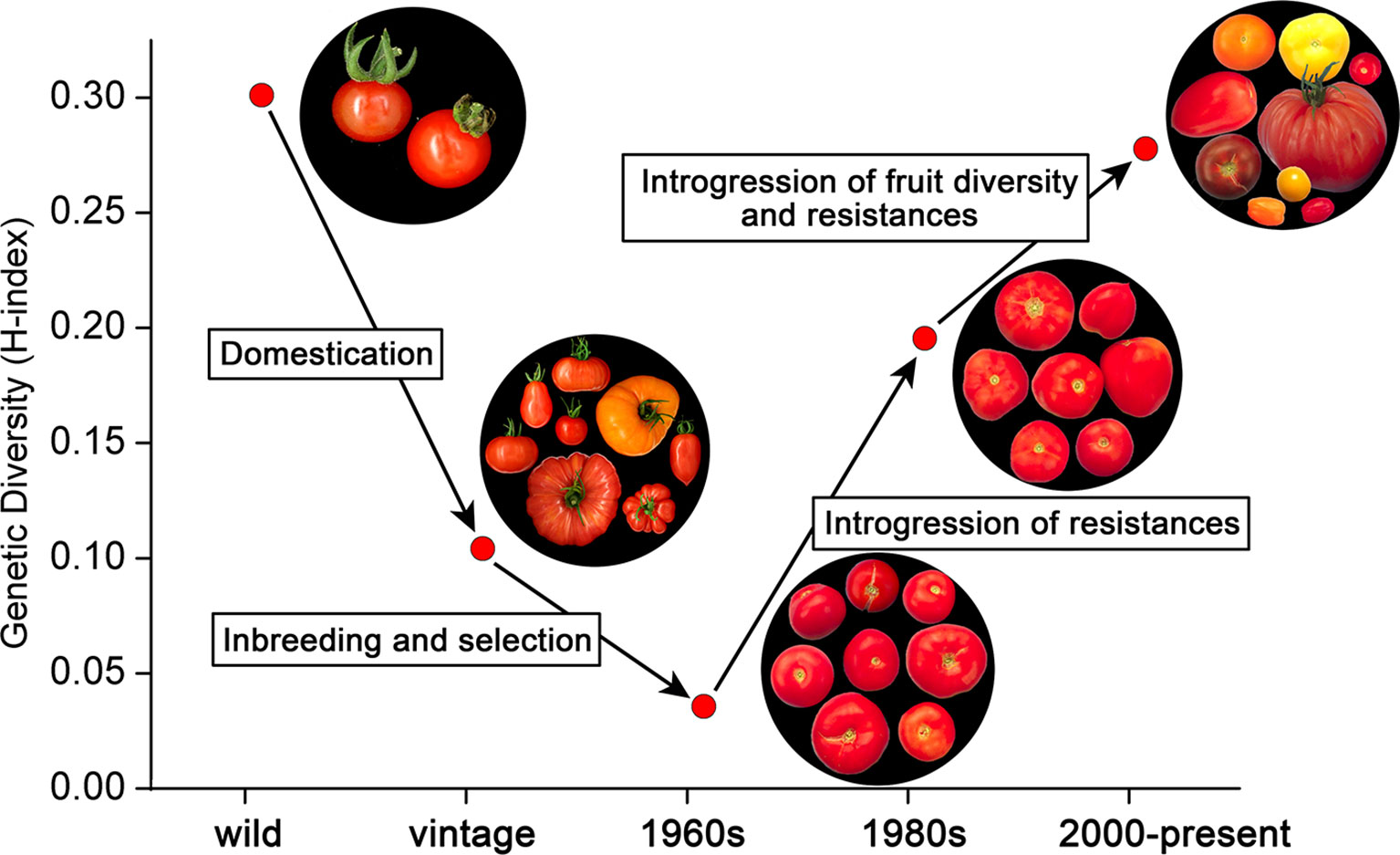
Evolution of genetic diversity in cultivated tomatoes

The poor taste and lack of sugar in modern garden and commercial tomato varieties resulted from breeding tomatoes to ripen uniformly red. This change occurred after the discovery of a mutant "u" phenotype in the mid-20th century, so named because the fruits ripened uniformly. This was widely cross-bred to produce red fruit without the typical green ring around the stem on un-crossbred varieties. Before this, most tomatoes produced more sugar during ripening, and were sweeter and more flavorful.

10–20% of the total carbon fixed in the fruit can be produced by photosynthesis in the developing fruit of the normal U phenotype. The u mutation encodes a factor that produces defective chloroplasts with lower density in developing fruit, making them a lighter green, and reducing sugar in the resulting ripe fruit by 10–15%. Perhaps more importantly, the fruit chloroplasts are remodelled during ripening into chlorophyll-free chromoplasts that synthesize and accumulate the carotenoids lycopene, β-carotene, and other metabolites that are sensory and nutritional assets of the ripe fruit. The potent chloroplasts in the dark-green shoulders of the "U" phenotype are beneficial here, but have the disadvantage of leaving green shoulders near the stems of the ripe fruit, and even cracked yellow shoulders. This is apparently because of oxidative stress due to overload of the photosynthetic chain in direct sunlight at high temperatures. Hence, genetic design of a commercial variety that combines the advantages of types "u" and "U" requires fine-tuning, but may be feasible.

Breeders strive to produce tomato plants with improved yield, shelf life, size, and resistance to environmental pressures, including disease. These efforts have yielded unintended negative consequences on various fruit attributes. For instance, linkage drag, the introduction of an undesired trait during backcrossing, has altered the metabolism of the fruit. This trait is physically close to the desired allele along the chromosome. Breeding for traits like larger fruit has thus unintentionally altered nutritional value and flavor.

Breeders have turned to wild tomato species as a source of alleles to introduce beneficial traits into modern varieties. For example, wild relatives may possess higher amounts of fruit solids (associated with greater sugar content), or resistance to diseases such as the early blight pathogen Alternaria solani. However, this tactic has limitations, since selection for traits such as pathogen resistance can negatively impact other favorable traits such as fruit production.

== Cultivation ==
The tomato is grown worldwide for its edible fruits, with thousands of cultivars.

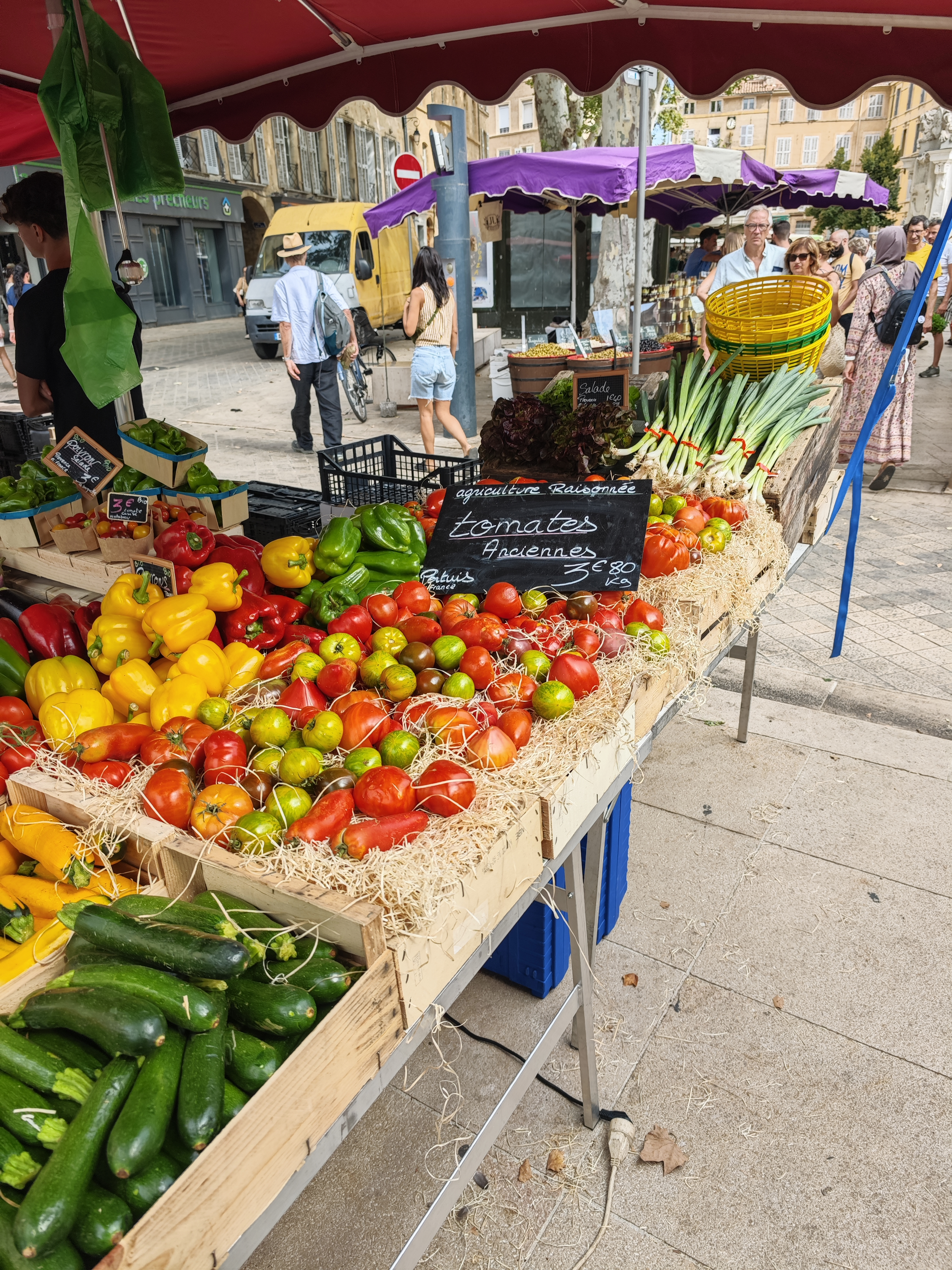
Heirloom varieties in a French market

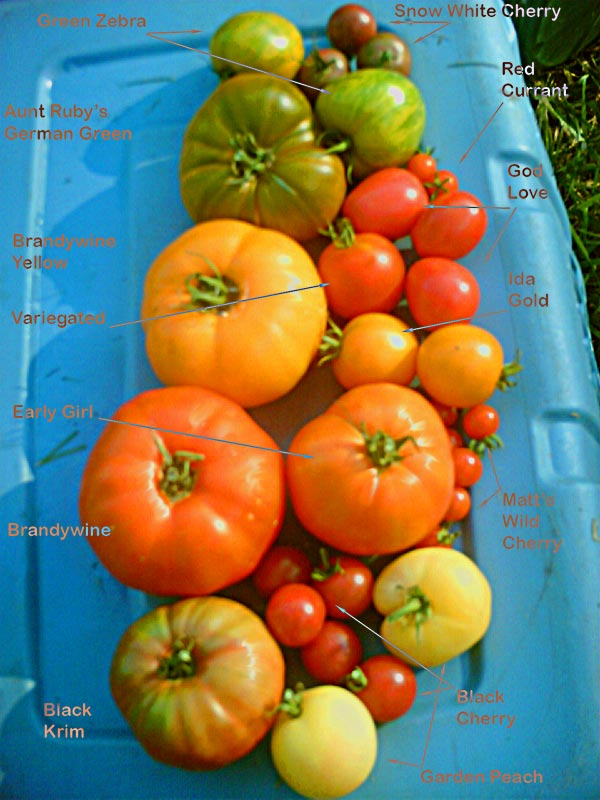
Heirloom cultivars Brandywine (biggest red), Black Krim (lower left) and Green Zebra (top left)

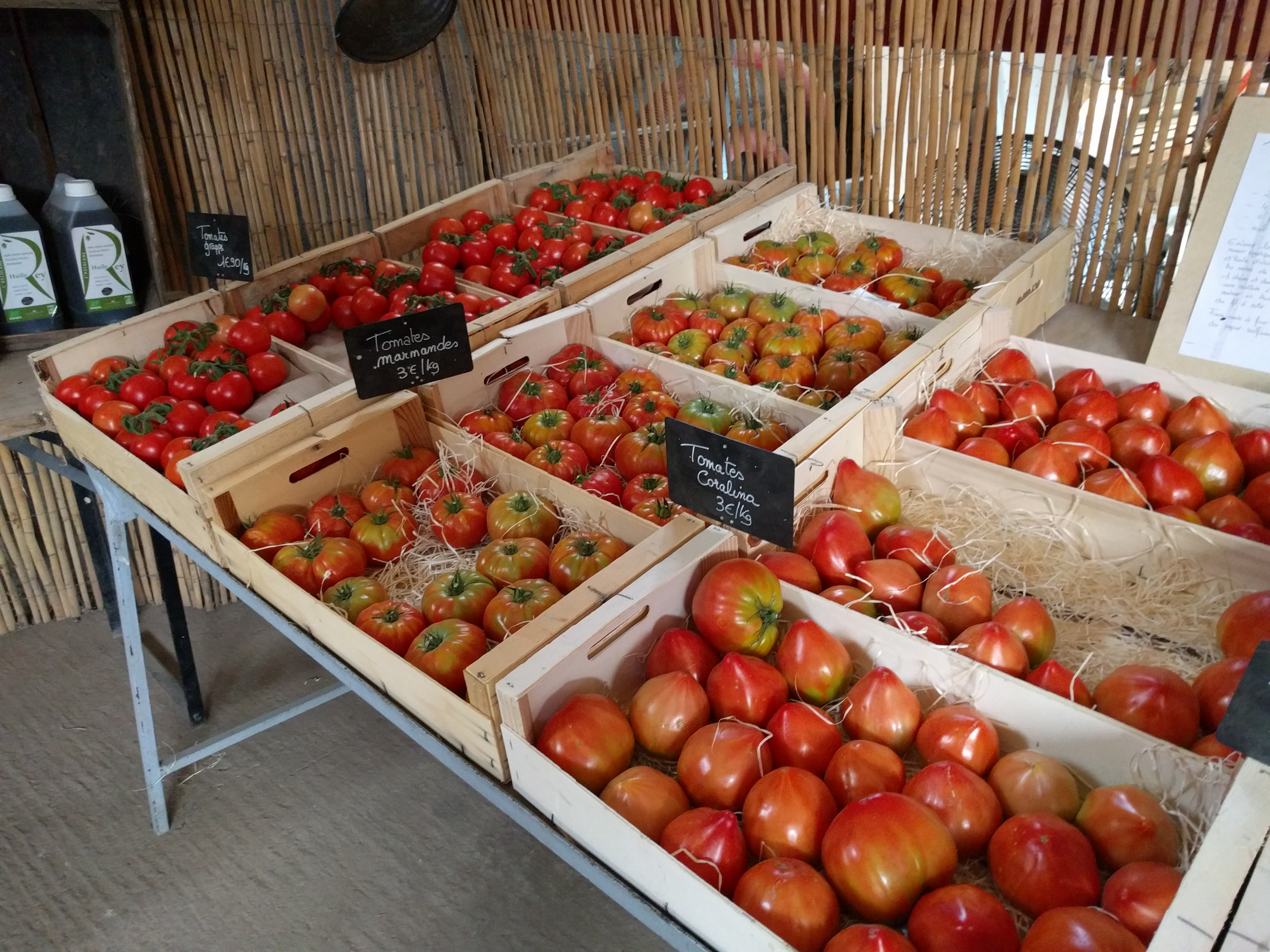
Modern varieties in France

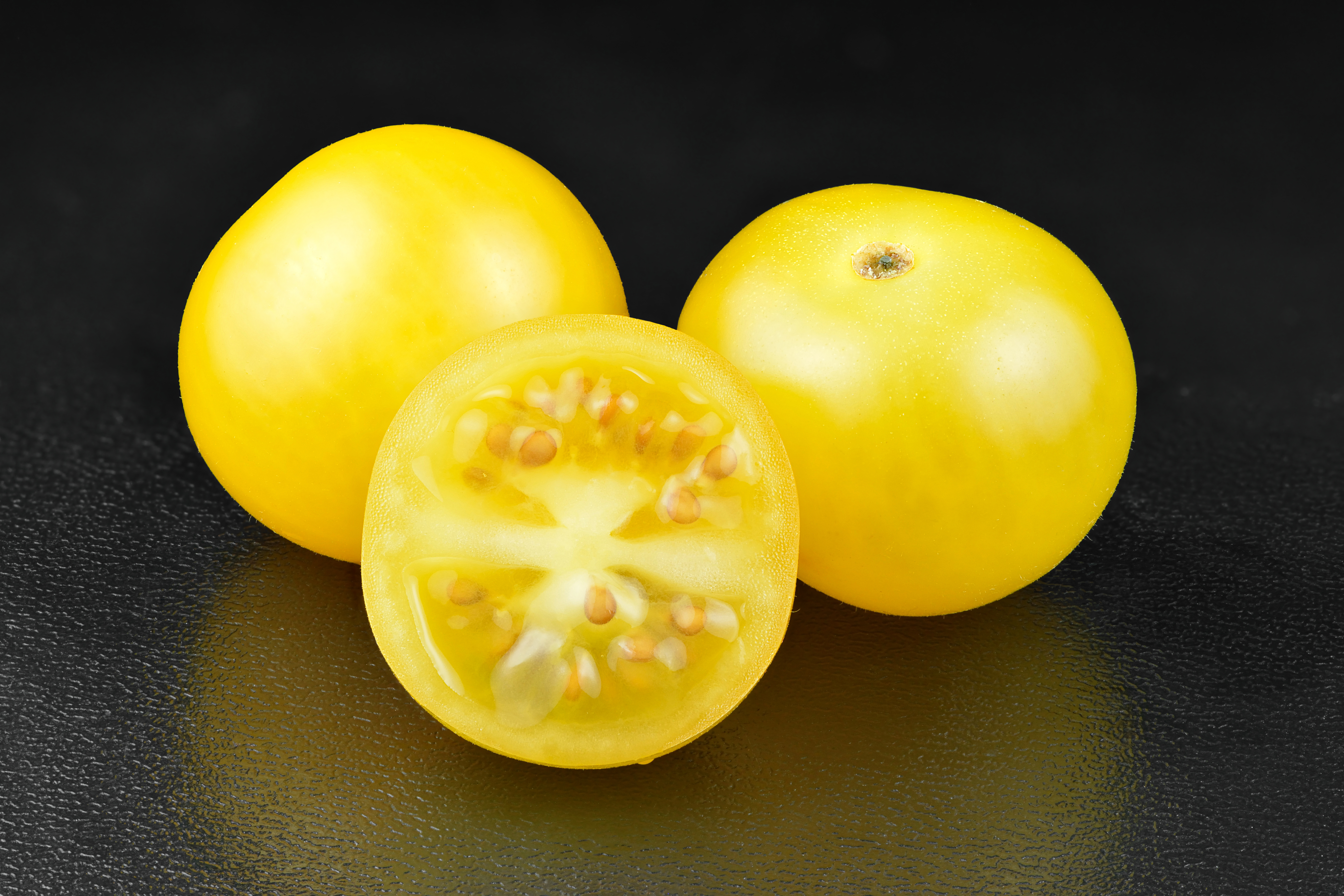
Yellow cherry tomatoes

=== Hydroponic and greenhouse ===
Greenhouse tomato production in large-acreage commercial greenhouses and owner-operator stand-alone or multiple-bay greenhouses is increasing, providing fruit during those times of the year when field-grown fruit is not readily available. Smaller varuetues (cherry and grape), or cluster tomatoes (fruit-on-the-vine) are preferred by the large commercial greenhouse operators, while beefsteak varieties are favoured by owner-operator growers. Tomatoes are also grown using hydroponics.

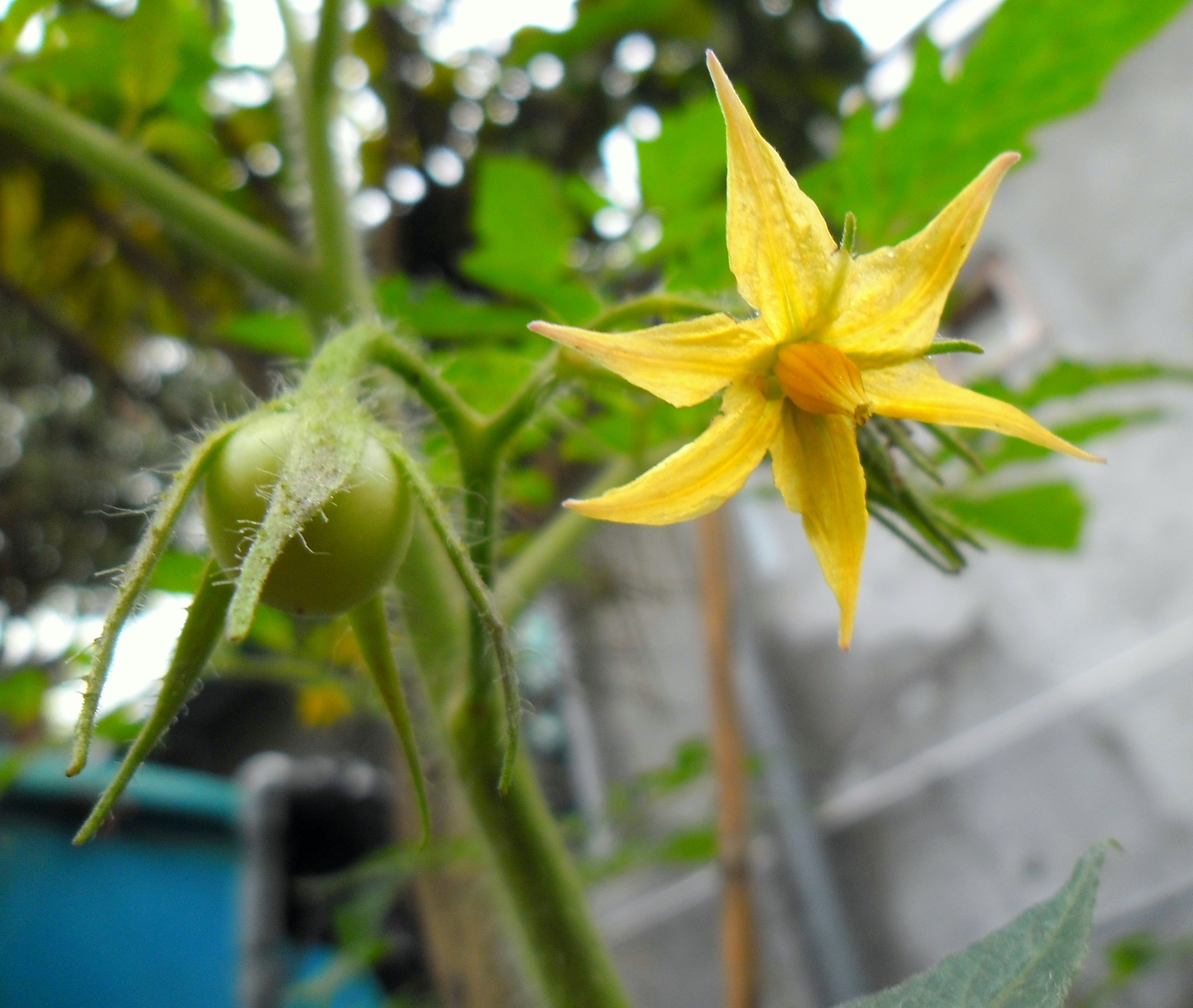
Flower and young fruit

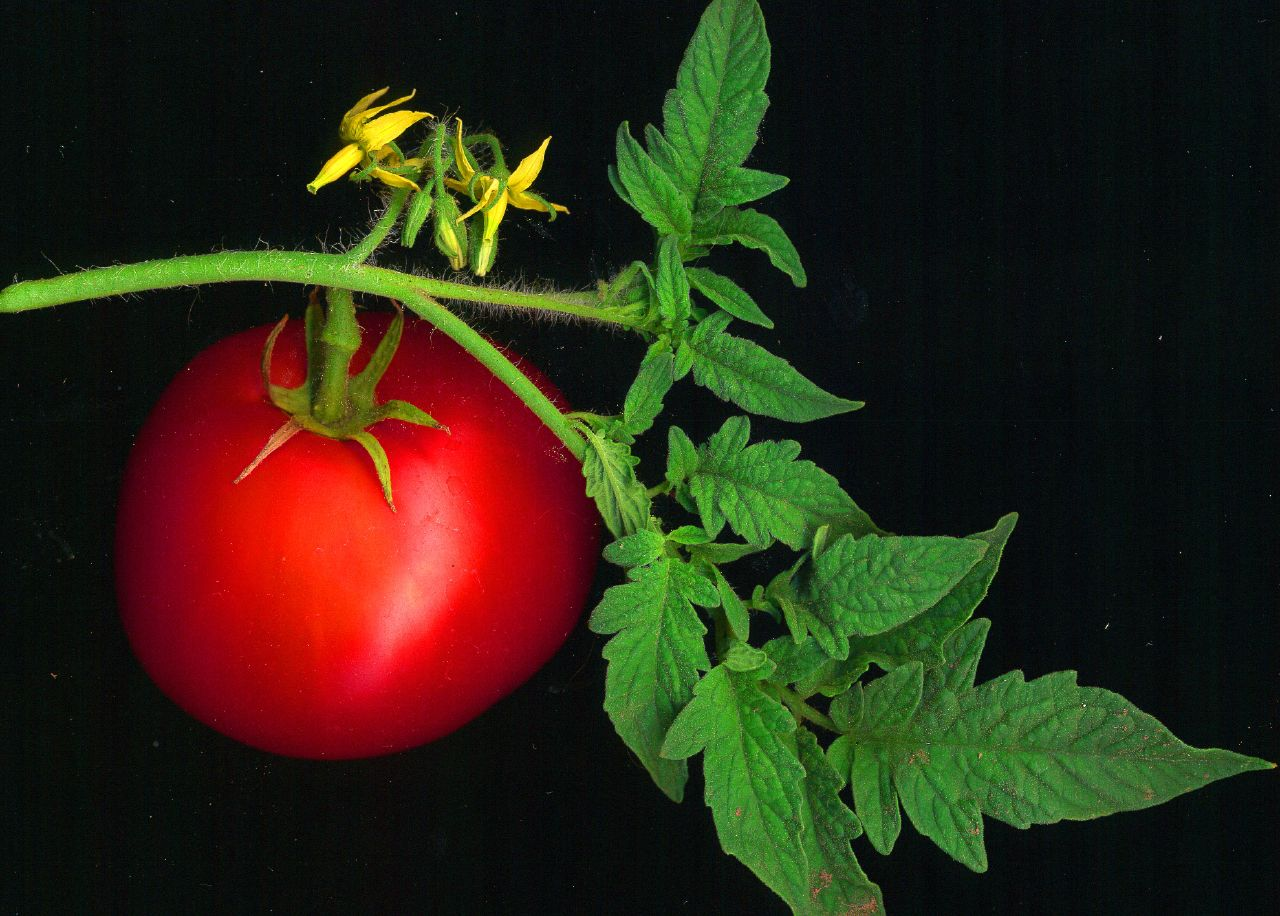
Flowers and ripe fruit can be present simultaneously.

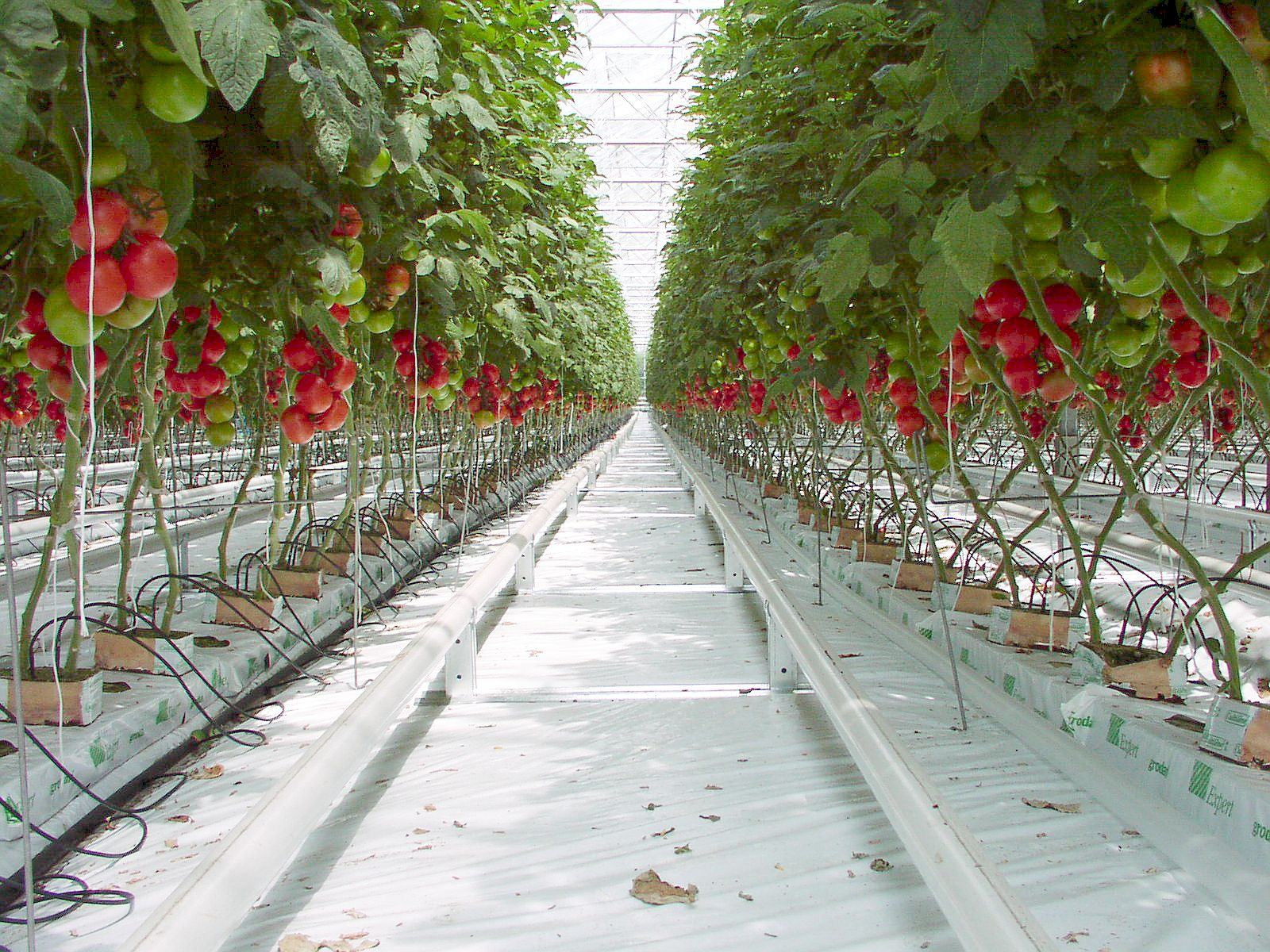
Hydroponic cultivation

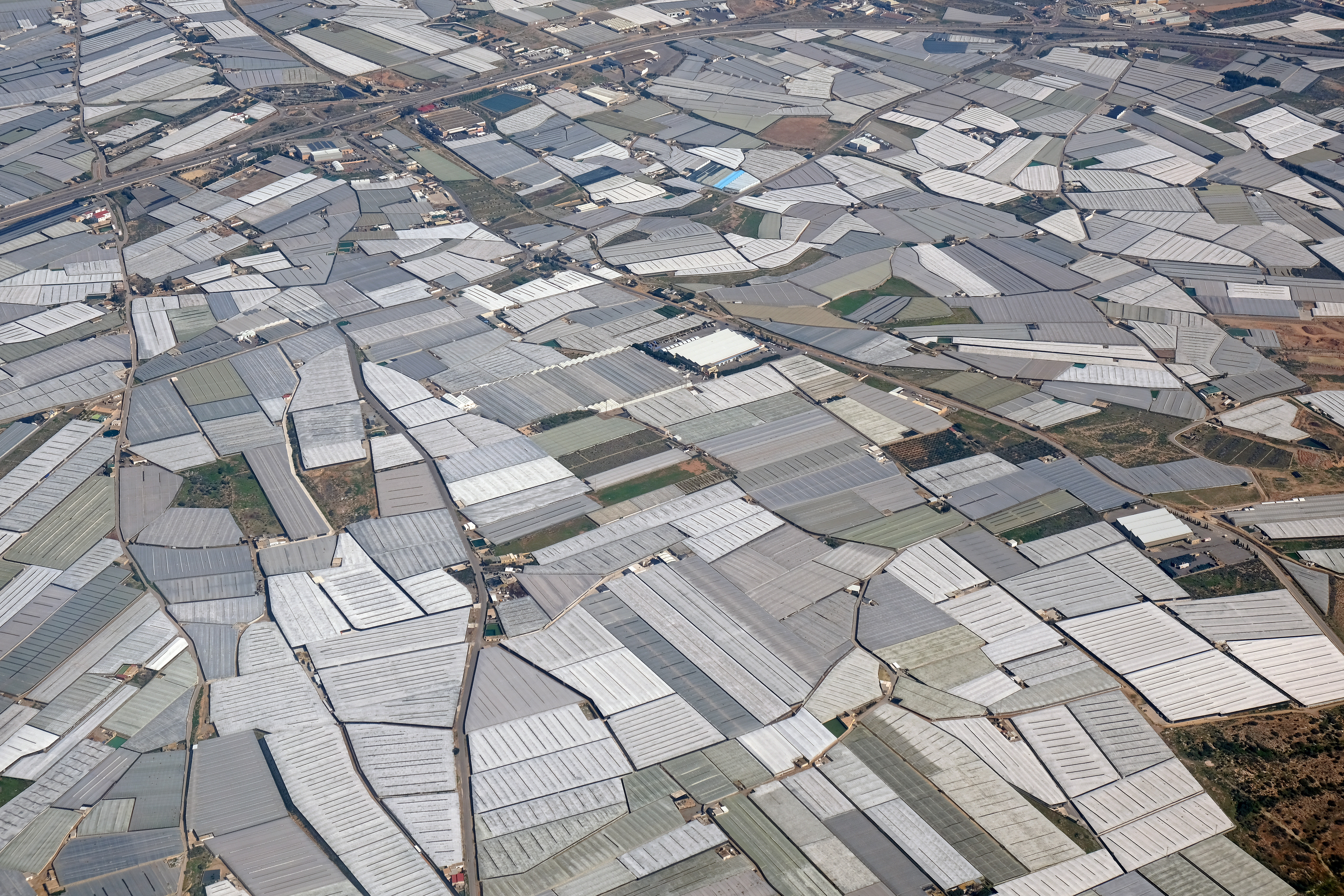
Greenhouse cultivation in Andalusia

=== Picking and ripening ===
To facilitate transportation and storage, tomatoes are often picked unripe (green) and ripened in storage with the plant hormone ethylene. At industrial scale, such as for canning, tomatoes are picked mechanically. The machine cuts the whole vine and uses sensors to separate ripe tomatoes from the rest of the plant, which is returned to the farm for use either as green manure or to be grazed by livestock.

=== Production ===
Tomato production 2023, millions of tonnes
China	70.1
India	29.4
Turkey	13.3
United States	12.4
Egypt	6.2
Mexico	4.4
World	192.3
Source: FAOSTAT of the United Nations

In 2023, world production of tomatoes was 192 million tonnes, led by China with 36% of the total, followed by India, Turkey, and the United States as secondary producers (table).

Tomato yields

Tomato production

== Pests and diseases ==
=== Pests ===
Common tomato pests include the tomato bug, stink bugs, cutworms, tomato hornworms and tobacco hornworms, aphids, cabbage loopers, whiteflies, tomato fruitworms, flea beetles, red spider mite, Tuta absoluta (tomato leafminer), slugs, and Colorado potato beetles. The tomato russet mite, Aculops lycopersici, feeds on foliage and young fruit of tomato plants, causing shrivelling and necrosis of leaves, flowers, and fruit, possibly killing the plant.

After an insect attack tomato plants produce systemin, a plant peptide hormone. This activates defensive mechanisms, such as the production of protease inhibitors to slow the growth of insects. The hormone was first identified in tomatoes.

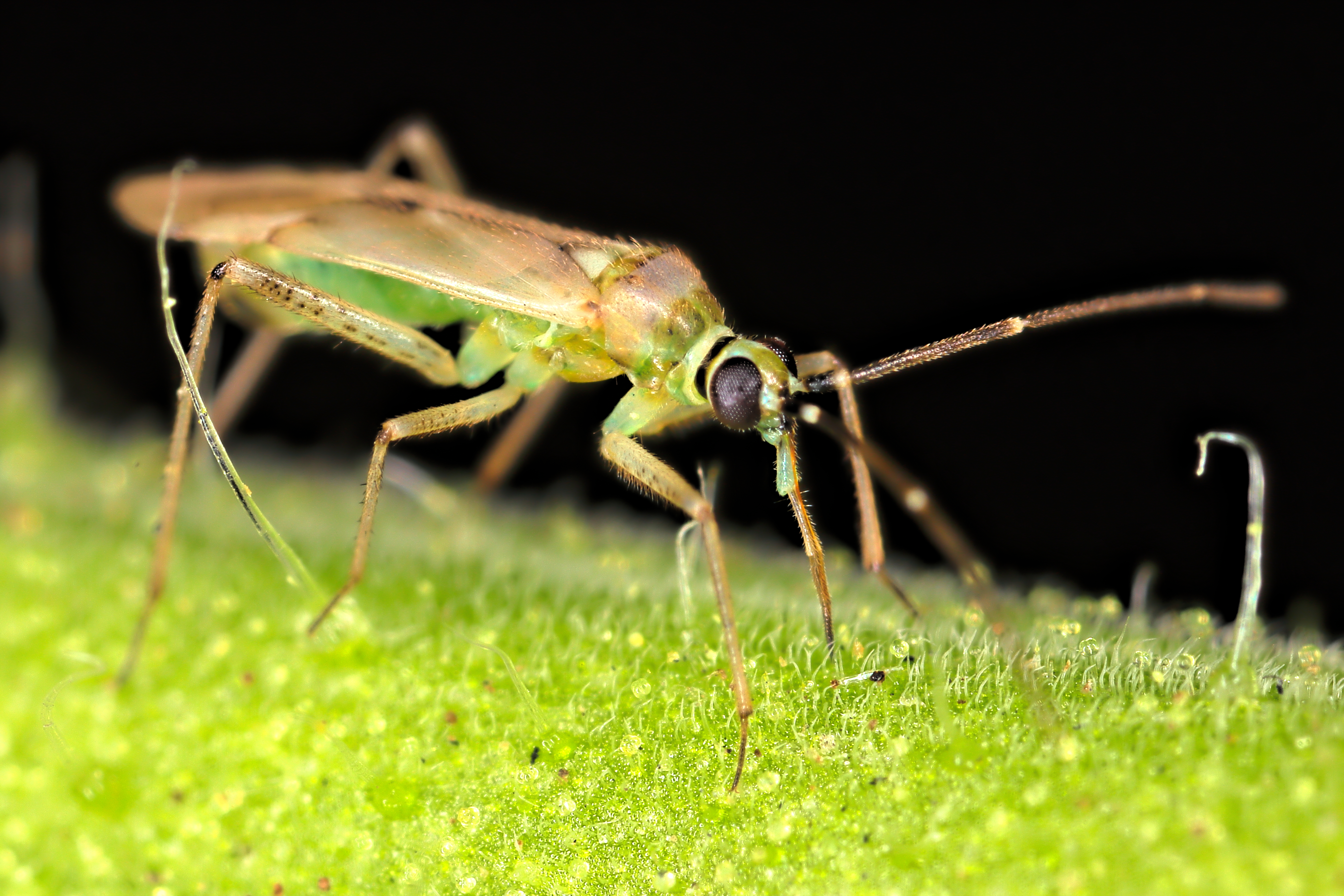
Tomato bug feeding on plant sap

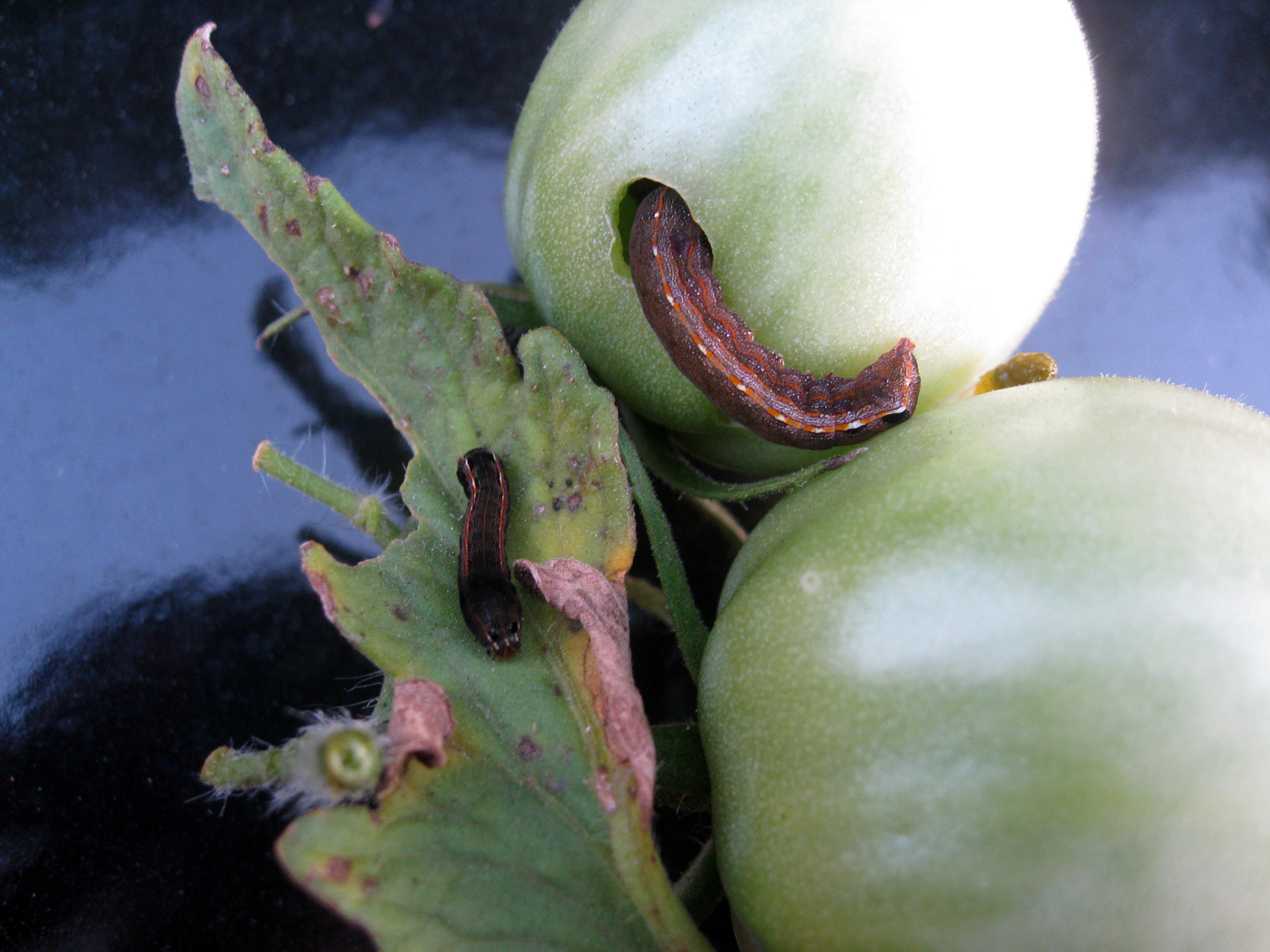
Tomato fruitworm feeding on unripe fruit

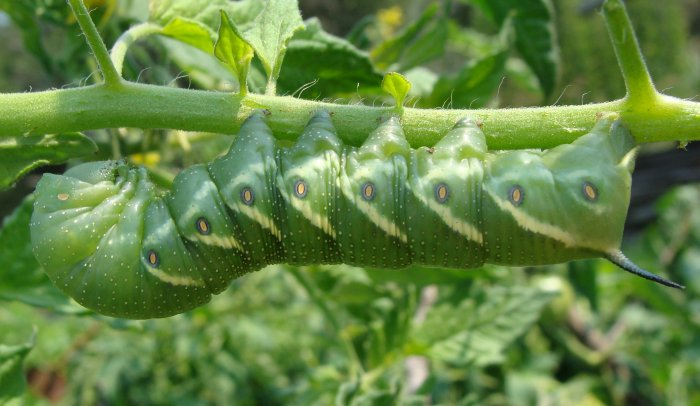
Tomato hornworm larva on stem

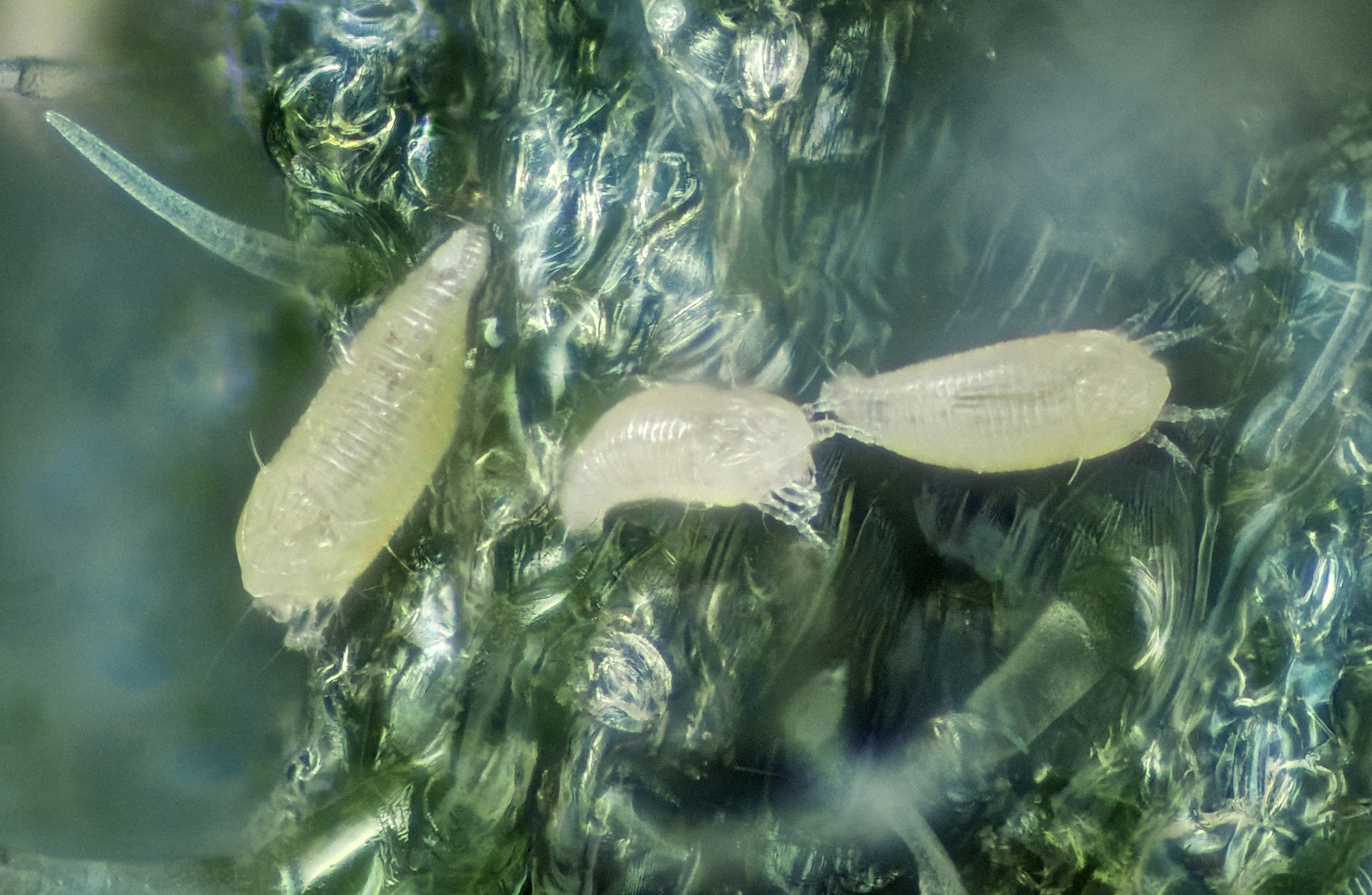
Tomato russet mites on greenhouse plant

=== Diseases ===
Tomato cultivars vary widely in their resistance to disease. Modern hybrids focus on improving disease resistance over the heirloom plants. A common tomato disease is tobacco mosaic virus. Handling cigarettes and other infected tobacco products can transmit the virus to tomato plants. A serious disease is curly top, carried by the beet leafhopper, which interrupts the lifecycle. As the name implies, it has the symptom of making the top leaves of the plant wrinkle up and grow abnormally. Bacterial wilt is another common disease impacting yield. Wang et al., 2019 found phage combination therapies to reduce the impact of bacterial wilt, sometimes by reducing bacterial abundance and sometimes by selecting for resistant but slow growing genetics.

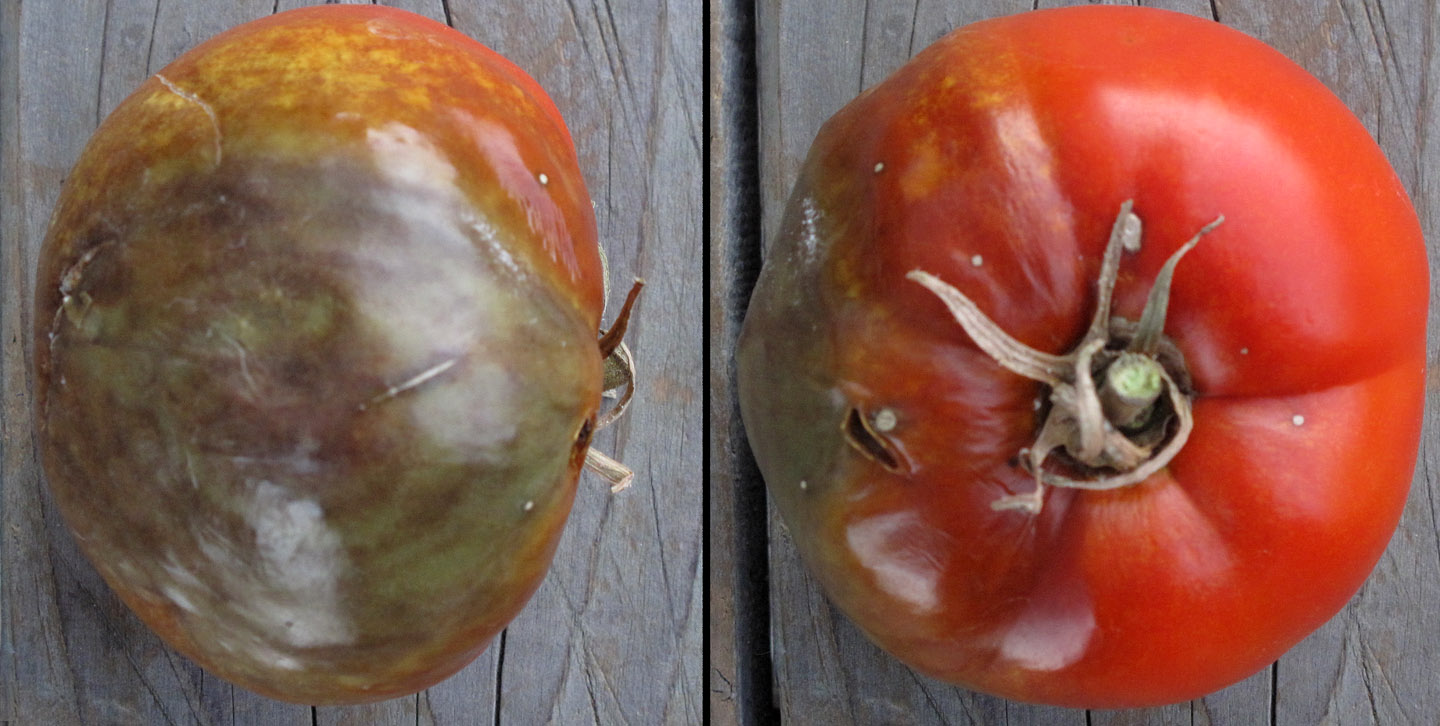
Late blight, caused by the oomycete Phytophthora infestans

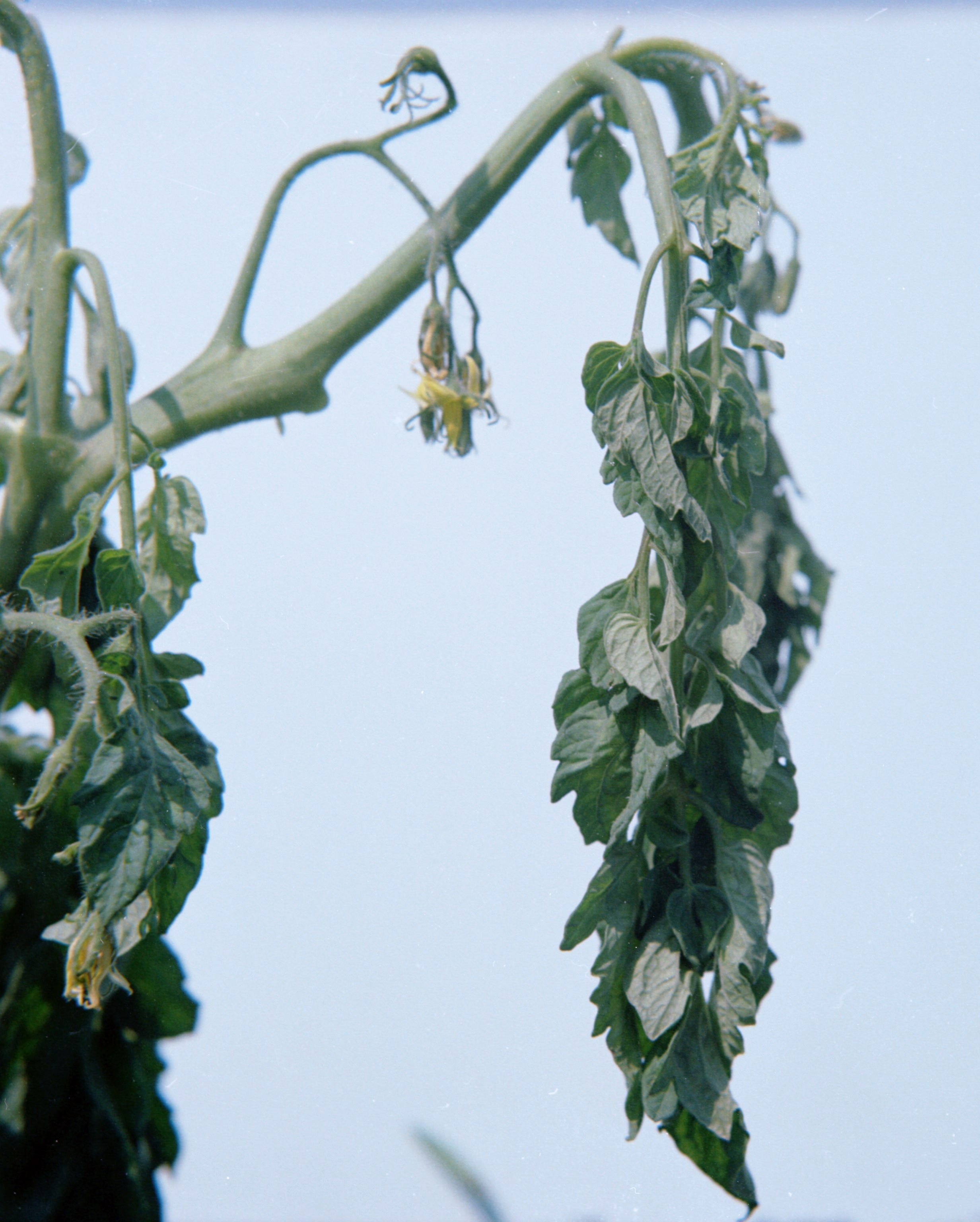
Wilt caused by the bacterium
Ralstonia solanacearum

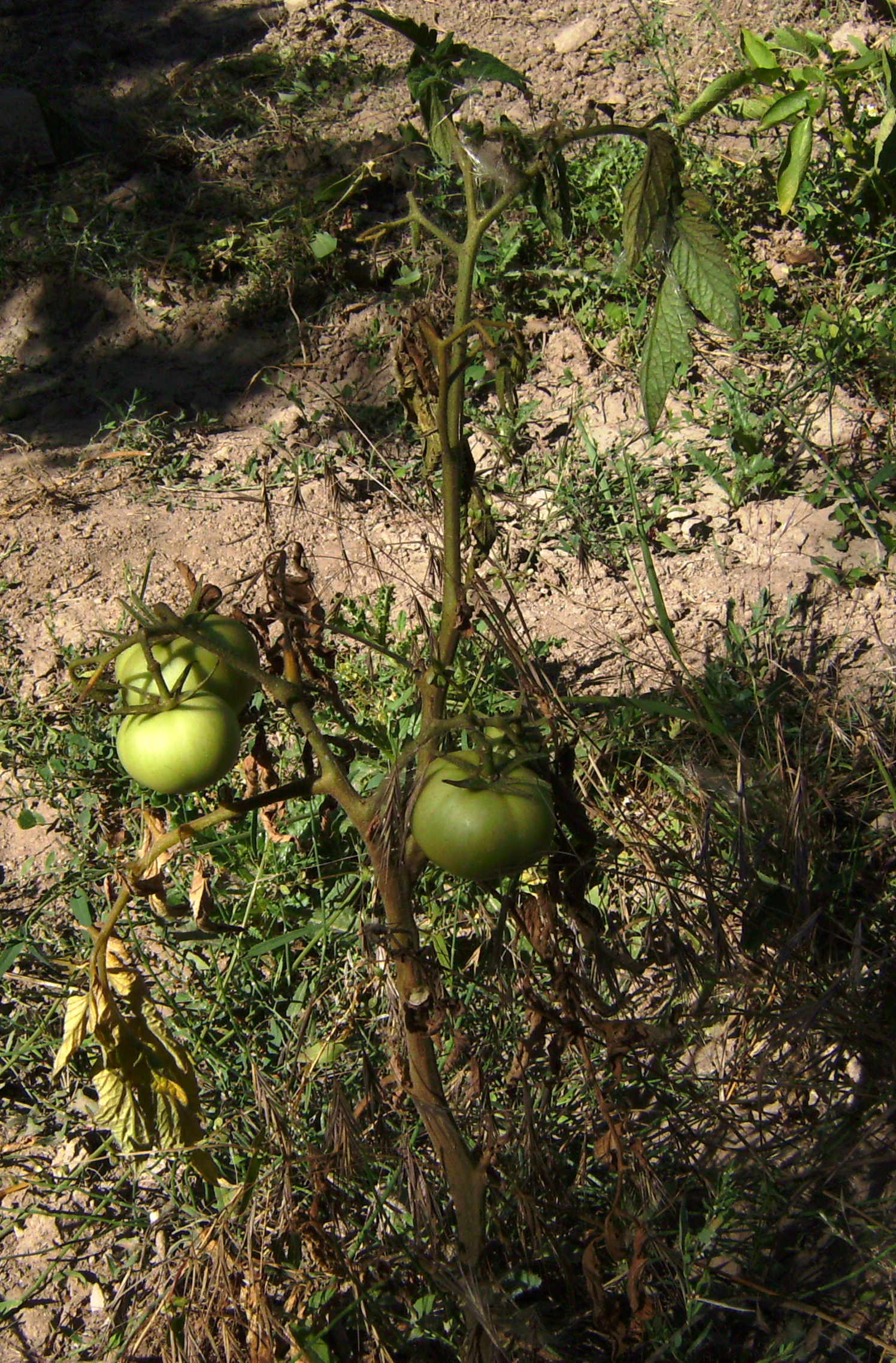
Wilt caused by Fusarium oxysporum

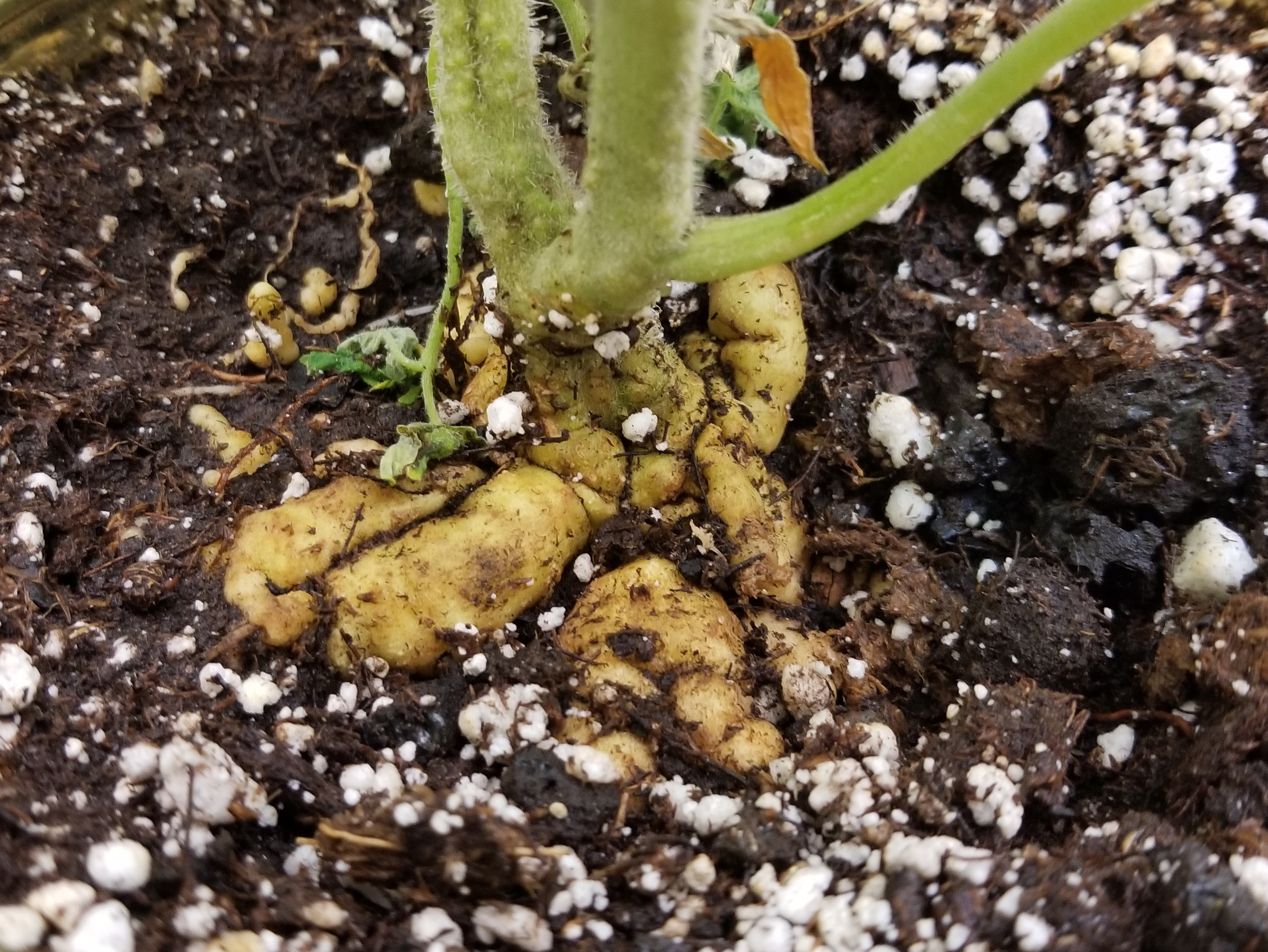
Nematode root-knot caused by Meloidogyne incognita

== As food ==
Yearly per capita supply of tomatoes

=== Culinary ===
Tomatoes, with their umami flavor, are extensively used in Mediterranean cuisine as a key ingredient in pizza and many pasta sauces. Tomatoes are used in Spanish gazpacho and Catalan pa amb tomàquet. The tomato is a crucial and ubiquitous part of Middle Eastern cuisine, served fresh in salads (e.g., Arab salad, Israeli salad, Shirazi salad and Turkish salad), grilled with kebabs and other dishes, made into sauces, and so on.

Tomatoes were gradually incorporated into Indian curry dishes after Europeans introduced them. A Kashmiri curry, rogan josh, often contains tomato; it may originally have been colored red with chili pepper, and tomatoes may characterize the Punjabi version of the dish. The modern British curry tikka masala often has a tomato and cream sauce.

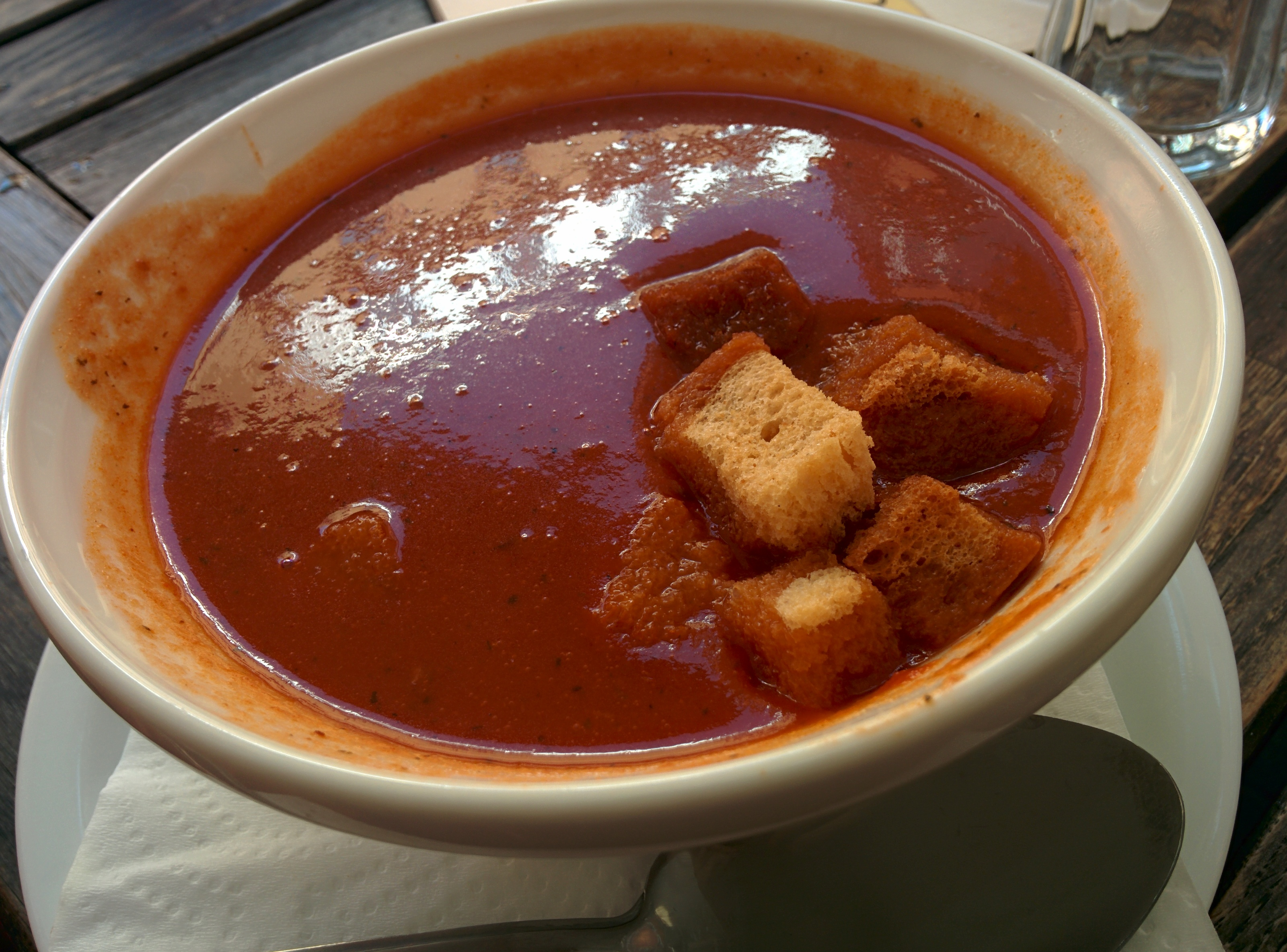
Tomato soup with croutons

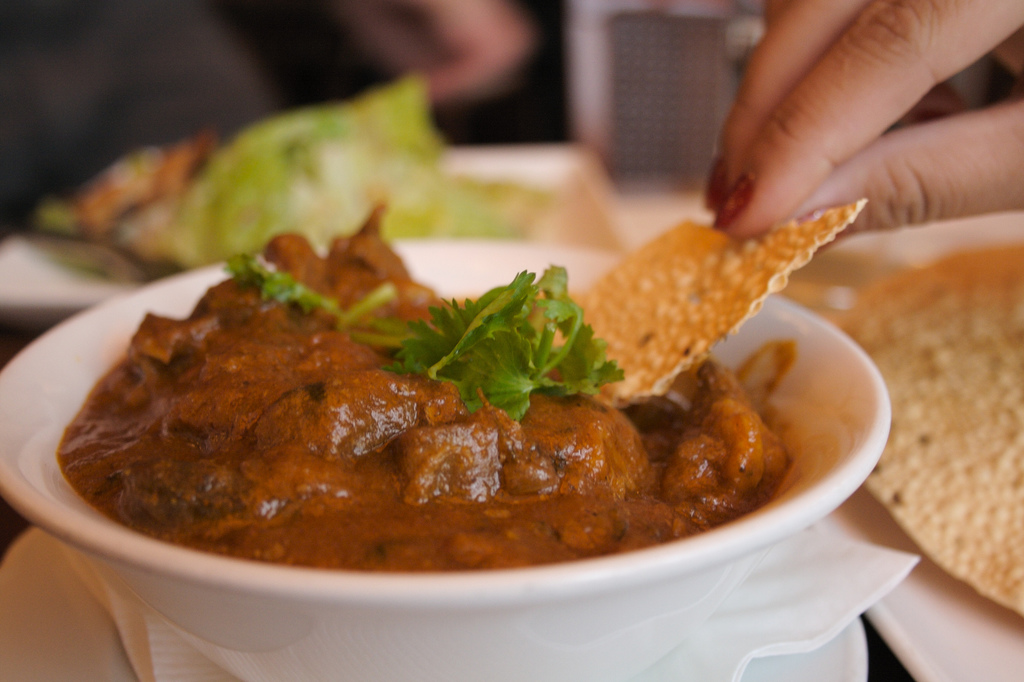
Rogan josh, a curry often made with tomatoes

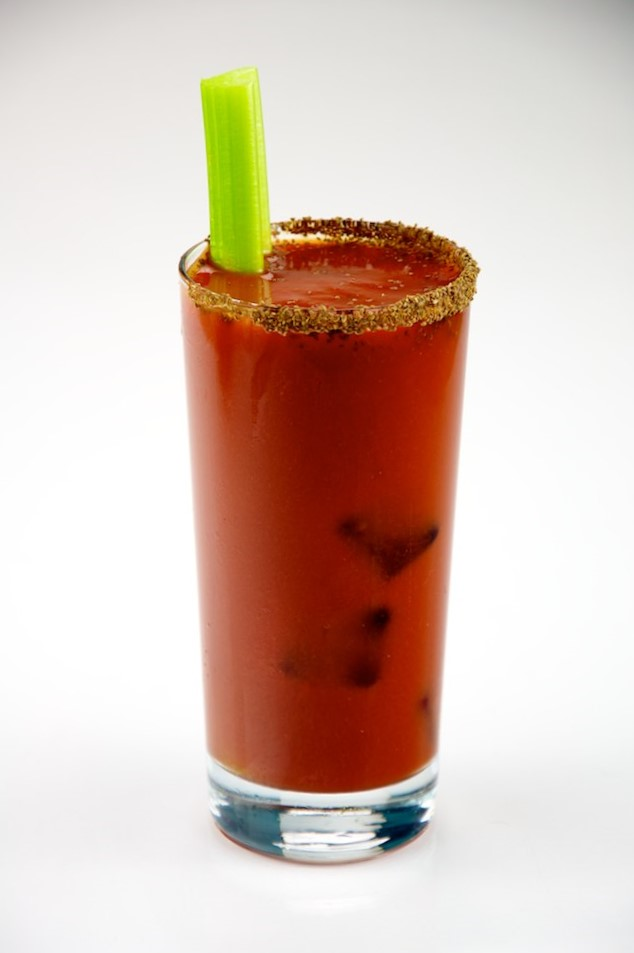
Bloody Mary, a tomato cocktail

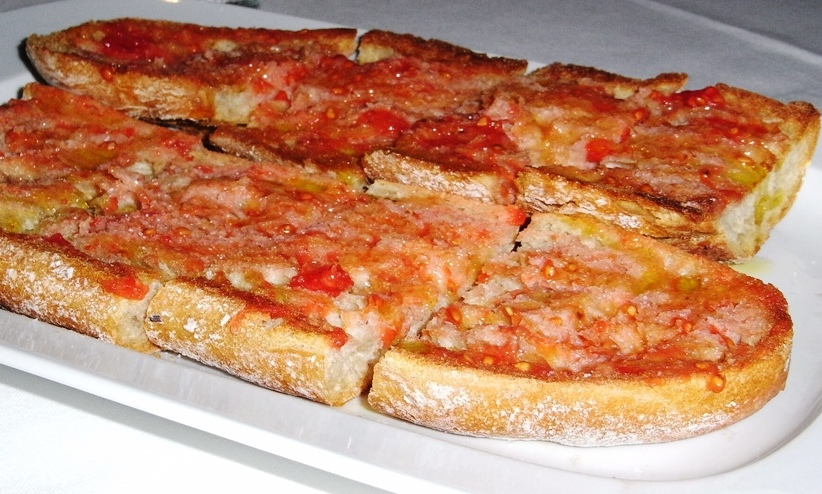
Pa amb tomàquet, Catalan tomato bread

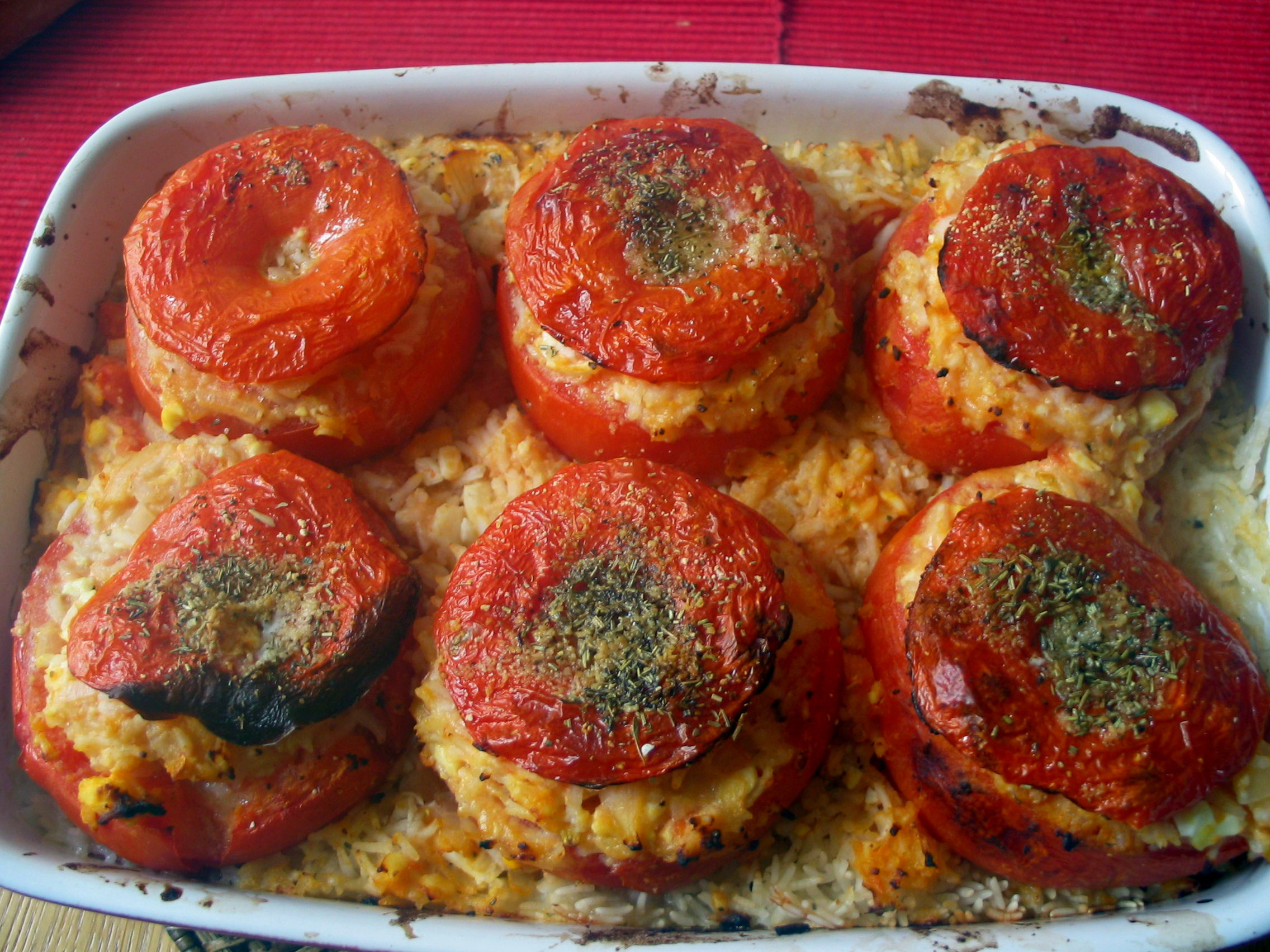
Tomatoes stuffed with egg and Parmesan cheese

=== Storage ===
Tomatoes keep best unwashed at room temperature and out of direct sunlight, rather than in a refrigerator. Storing stem down can prolong shelf life. Unripe tomatoes can be kept in a paper bag to ripen. Tomatoes can be preserved by canning, freezing, drying, or cooking down to a paste or puree.

=== Nutrition ===
Red tomatoes, raw
Nutritional value per 100 g (3.5 oz)
- Energy: 74 kJ (18 kcal)
- Carbohydrates: 3.9 g
- Sugars: 2.6 g
- Dietary fiber: 1.2 g
- Fat: 0.2 g
- Protein: 0.9 g
Vitamins and minerals
Vitamins	Quantity %DV^{†}
Vitamin A equiv. beta-Carotene lutein zeaxanthin	5% 42 μg 4% 449 μg 123 μg
Thiamine (B1)	3% 0.037 mg
Riboflavin (B2)	1% 0.019 mg
Niacin (B3)	4% 0.594 mg
Pantothenic acid (B5)	2% 0.089 mg
Vitamin B6	5% 0.08 mg
Folate (B9)	4% 15 μg
Vitamin C	16% 14 mg
Vitamin E	4% 0.54 mg
Vitamin K	7% 7.9 μg
Minerals	Quantity %DV^{†}
Calcium	1% 10 mg
Iron	2% 0.27 mg
Magnesium	3% 11 mg
Manganese	5% 0.114 mg
Phosphorus	2% 24 mg
Potassium	8% 237 mg
Sodium	0% 5 mg
Zinc	2% 0.17 mg
- Other constituents: Quantity
- Water: 94.5 g
- Lycopene: 2570 μg
- Link to USDA Database entry
- ^{†}Percentages estimated using US recommendations for adults, except for potassium, which is estimated based on expert recommendation from the National Academies.

A raw tomato is 95% water, 4% carbohydrates, and less than 1% each of fat and protein (table). In a reference amount of 100 grams (3.5 oz), raw tomatoes supply 18 calories and 16% of the Daily Value of vitamin C, but otherwise have low micronutrient content (table).

=== Effects on health ===
The US Food and Drug Administration has determined there is little credible evidence that tomatoes or tomato-based foods reduce the risk of various types of cancer.

In a 2011 scientific review, the European Food Safety Authority concluded that lycopene did not favorably influence DNA, skin exposed to ultraviolet radiation, heart function or vision.

=== Toxins ===
The leaves, stem, and green unripe fruit of the tomato plant contain small amounts of the alkaloid tomatine. They contain small amounts of solanine, a toxic alkaloid found in larger amounts in potato leaves and other members of the nightshade family. Tomato plants can be toxic to dogs if they eat large amounts of the fruit, or chew plant material.

Small amounts of tomato foliage are sometimes used for flavoring, and the green fruit of unripe red tomato varieties is sometimes used for cooking, particularly as fried green tomatoes.

=== Salmonella outbreaks ===
Tomatoes have been linked to multiple Salmonella food poisoning outbreaks in the US. One in 2008 caused the temporary removal of tomatoes from stores and restaurants across the United States and parts of Canada. In 2022 and 2023, an outbreak of Salmonella Senftenberg ST14 affected the US and 12 countries in Europe.

== In popular culture ==
=== Celebrations ===
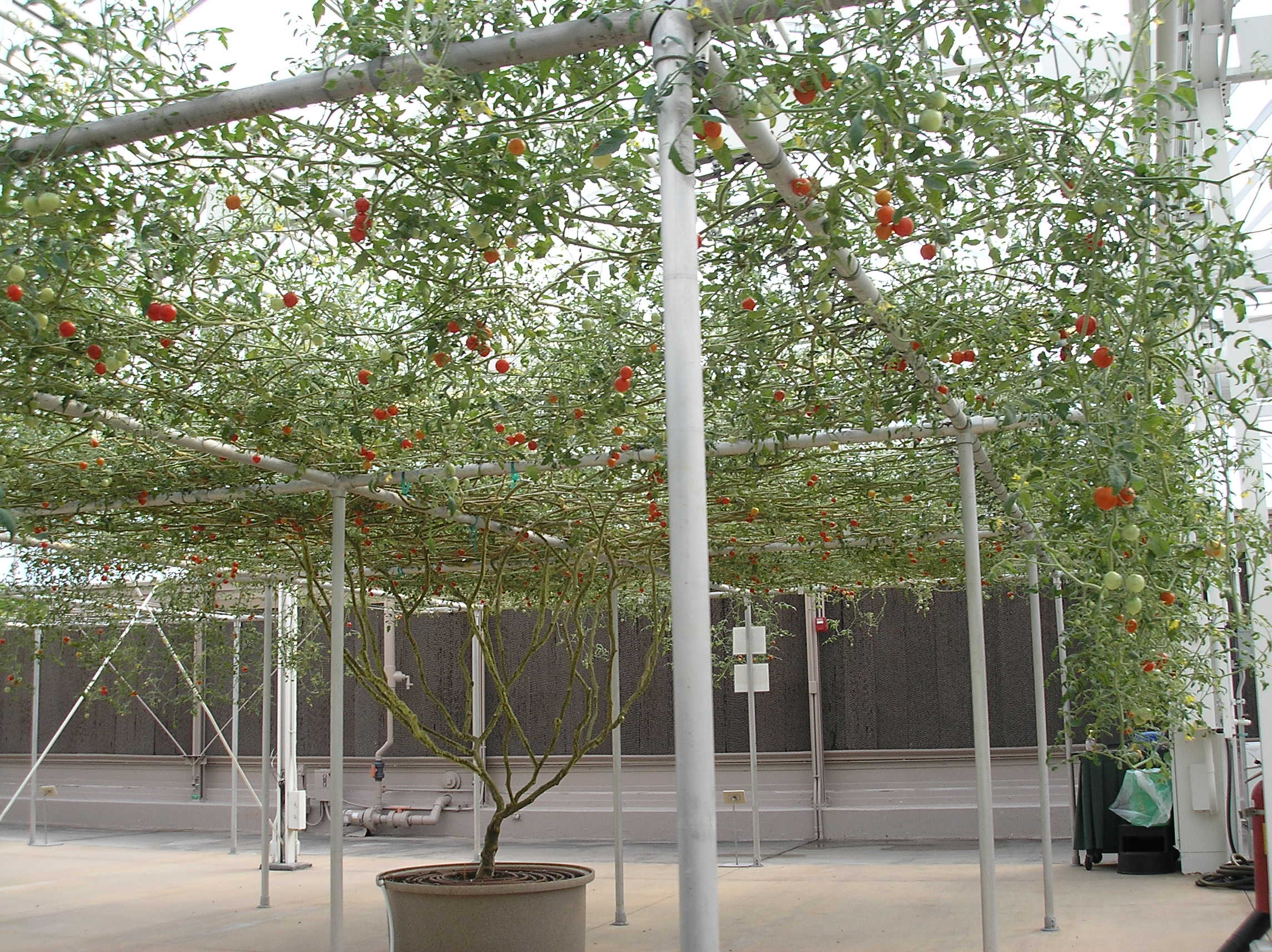
The "tomato tree" at the Walt Disney World Resort's experimental greenhouses

A massive "tomato tree" in the Walt Disney World Resort's experimental greenhouses in Lake Buena Vista, Florida may have been the largest single tomato plant. It yielded a harvest of more than 32,000 tomatoes, together weighing 522 kg (1,151 lb).

The town of Buñol, Spain, annually celebrates La Tomatina, a festival centered on an enormous tomato fight. On 30 August 2007, as many as 40,000 Spaniards gathered to throw 115,000 kg (254,000 lb) of tomatoes at each other in the festival.

Some US states have adopted the tomato as a state fruit or vegetable. Arkansas took both sides by declaring the South Arkansas Vine Ripe Pink Tomato both the state fruit and the state vegetable in the same law, citing both its culinary and botanical classifications. In 2009, the state of Ohio passed a law making the tomato the state's official fruit, while tomato juice has been the state's official beverage since 1965. Livingston's plant breeding is commemorated in his home town of Reynoldsburg with an annual Tomato Festival; it calls itself "The Birthplace of the Tomato". In Finland, the Tomatkarnevalen is held annually in the town of Närpes.

Tomatoes are sometimes thrown in public protests. Embracing it for this connotation, the Dutch Socialist party adopted the tomato as their logo. The same meaning is evoked in the name of the American review-aggregation website for film and television, "Rotten Tomatoes", though its founder mentions a scene in the 1992 movie Leolo as the immediate source of the name.

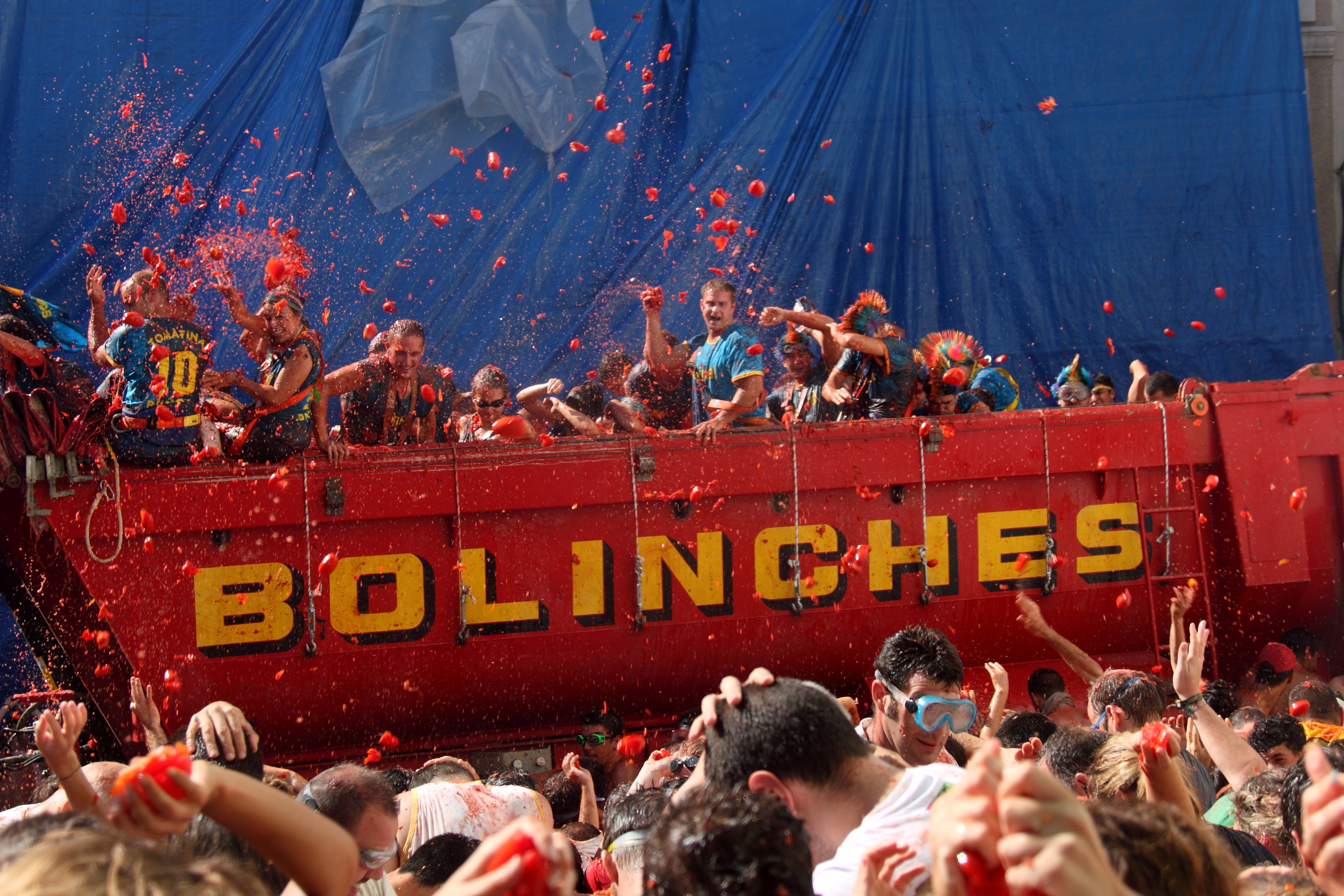
Throwing tomatoes from a truck during the Spanish Tomatina festival

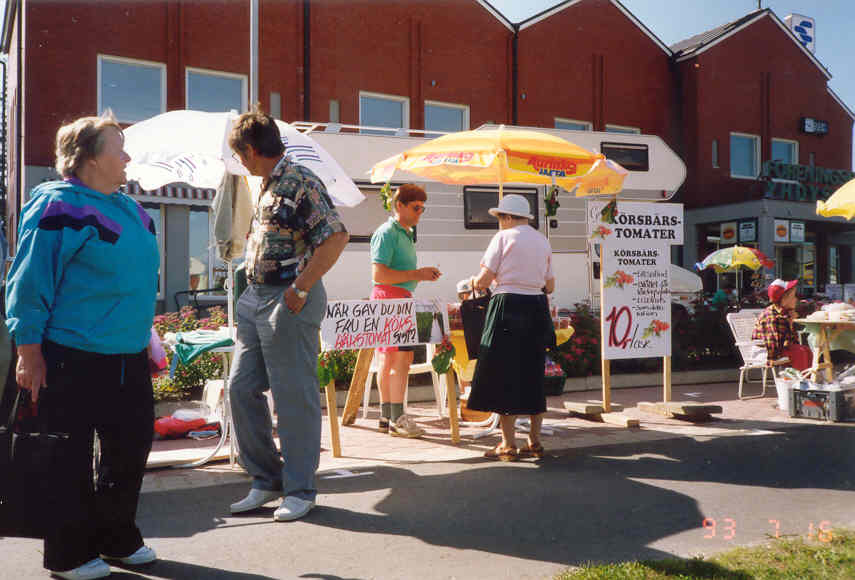
Tomatkarnevalen (The Tomato Carnival) in Närpes, Finland, in 1993

=== Fruit or vegetable ===
Although the tomato is cooked and eaten as a vegetable, botanically, a tomato is a fruit, specifically a berry, consisting of the ovary, together with its seeds, of a flowering plant. The issue has led to legal dispute in the United States. In 1887, U.S. tariff laws that imposed a duty on vegetables, but not on fruit, caused the tomato's status to become a matter of legal importance. In Nix v. Hedden, the U.S. Supreme Court settled the controversy on 10 May 1893, by declaring that for the purposes of the Tariff of 1883 only, the tomato is a vegetable, based on the popular definition that classifies vegetables by use—they are generally served with dinner and not dessert.

== See also ==
- La Tomatina, world's largest tomato food fight
- List of countries by tomato production
- List of tomato dishes
- Marglobe, an early attempt at breeding a disease-resistant tomato
- Ring culture
- Physalis, a similar fruit also used in cooking
- Tomato effect
- Tomato jam
- Nightshades
  - Potato
  - Eggplant
  - Tomatillo, a similar fruit from the related genus

== Sources ==
- Collingham, Lizzie (2006) [2005 (Chatto & Windus)]. Curry: A Tale of Cooks and Conquerors. London: Vintage Books. ISBN 978-0-099-43786-4.
- Smith, Andrew F. (1994). The Tomato in America: Early History, Culture, and Cookery. Columbia, South Carolina: University of South Carolina Press. ISBN 978-1-57003-000-0.
