= Alexander Livingstone =

Alexander Livingstone may refer to:

- Alexander Livingston, 5th Lord Livingston (d. 1553), Scottish landowner
- Alexander Livingstone, 1st Earl of Linlithgow (died 1623), 7th Lord Livingston, created Earl of Linlithgow in 1600
- Alexander Livingstone (Scottish politician) (1880–1950), Scottish Liberal Member of Parliament 1923–1929
- Alexander Livingstone (Alberta politician)

== See also ==
- Alexander Livingston (disambiguation)
