= Alexander W. Livingston =

American horticulturist (1821–1898)

Alexander W. Livingston (1821–1898) was an American horticulturist and seed company founder. He developed some of the first tomato varieties that were suitable for commercial production. The U.S. Department of Agriculture's 1937 yearbook declared that "half of the major varieties were a result of the abilities of the Livingstons to evaluate and perpetuate superior material in the tomato." Livingston's first breed of tomato, the Paragon, was introduced in 1870.

== Biography ==
Livingston was born on October 14, 1821 (some sources say 1822) in Reynoldsburg, Ohio.

He married Matilda Dickey Graham in 1840. They had 10 children. Their house in Reynoldsburg was listed in the National Register of Historic Places in 1994.

He was working for another seed grower when he purchased his own farm land near Reynoldsburg and eventually purchased his employers farm land.

He was interested in growing tomatoes that had a uniform roundness, size and better flavor. He would select tomatoes with those characteristics and save the seeds and plant them the next year. After several years of doing this, he had a tomato that he felt was good enough to market. He and his company would go on to develop seventeen varieties of tomato.

He eventually started the A.W. Livingston's Sons seed company in Columbus, Ohio.

Livingston died in 1898.

== Bibliography ==
- Livingston and the tomato, A. W. Livingston, 1893
