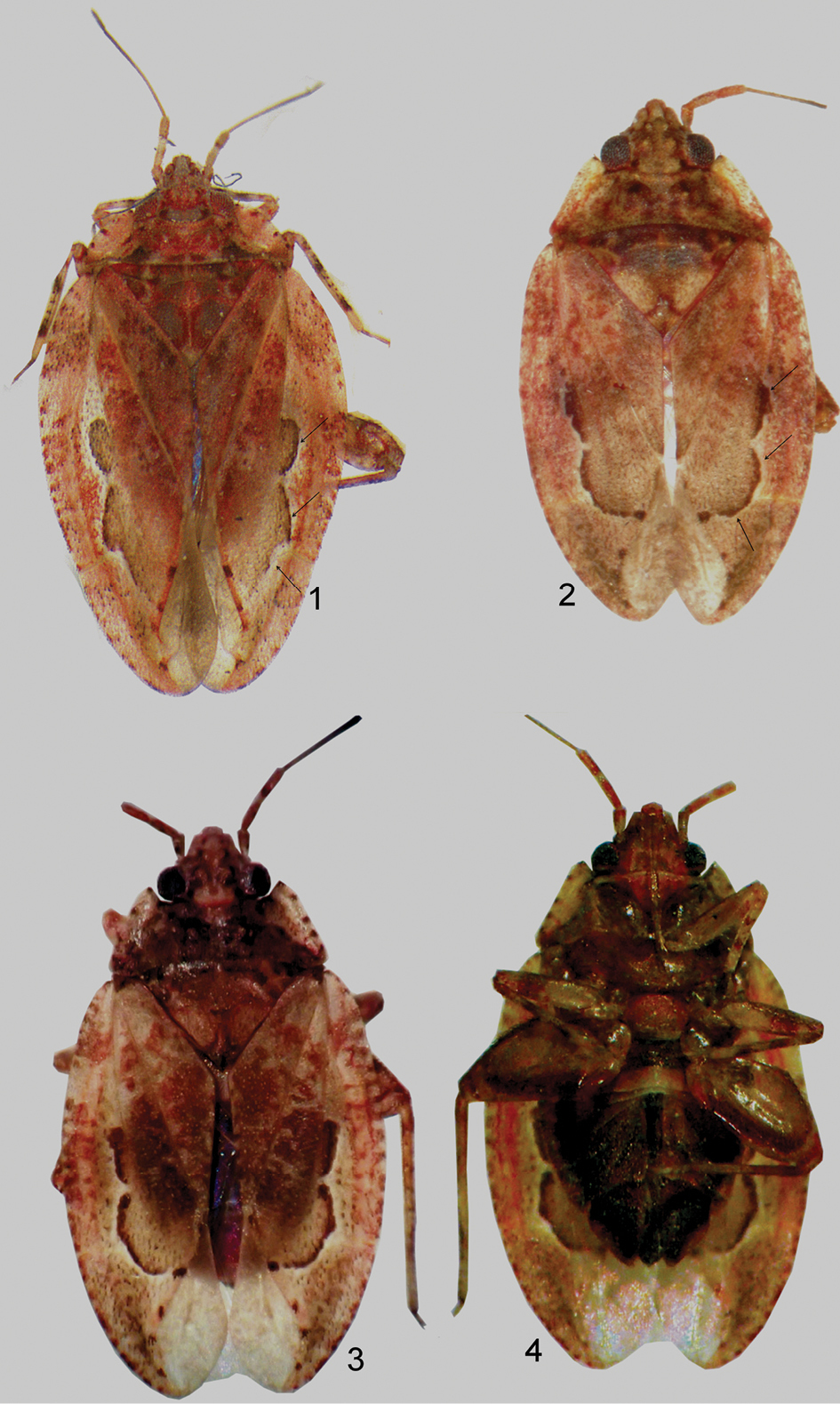
- Helopeltis antonii

Scientific classification
- Kingdom: Animalia
- Phylum: Arthropoda
- Clade: Pancrustacea
- Class: Insecta
- Order: Hemiptera
- Suborder: Heteroptera
- Family: Miridae
- Subfamily: Cylapinae
- Genus: Sulawesifulvius; Gorczyca, Chérot & Štys, 2004

= Sulawesifulvius =

Genus of true bugs

Sulawesifulvius is a genus of true bugs in the family Miridae. The genus was described in 2004 based on a specimen collected by fogging of the forest canopy in Sulawesi. It was found to be unlike any other members in the subfamily Cylapinae. The type species was named in honour of entomologist Randall T. Schuh. Almost nothing is known of the biology of the species.

Sulawesifulvius looks similar to Peritropis but is more flattened with tubercles on the vertex and frons, a short beak and prominent angles in fronts of the pronotum (top of thorax). The genus was monotypic until a second species was described in 2014 from Yinggeling National Nature Reserve in the Hainan Province of China, a third from southern India in 2015, and a fourth from Thailand in 2017.

== Species ==
These species belong to the genus Sulawesifulvius:

- Sulawesifulvius indicus Yeshwanth & Frédéric, 2015 - India
- Sulawesifulvius schuhi Gorczyca, Cherot, & Stys, 2004 - Sulawesi, Indonesia
- Sulawesifulvius thailandicus Wolski, Yasunaga & Gorczyca, 2017 - Thailand
- Sulawesifulvius yinggelingensis Mu & Liu, 2014 - Hainan, China
