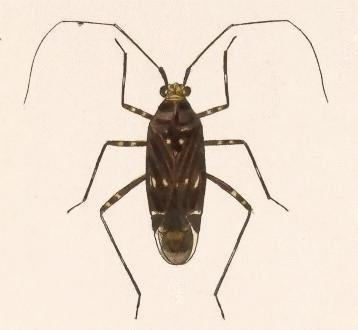
- Cylapus famularis

Scientific classification
- Kingdom: Animalia
- Phylum: Arthropoda
- Clade: Pancrustacea
- Class: Insecta
- Order: Hemiptera
- Suborder: Heteroptera
- Family: Miridae
- Subfamily: Cylapinae
- Genus: Cylapus; Say, 1832

= Cylapus =

Genus of true bugs

Cylapus is a genus of plant bugs in the family Miridae. There are about 12 described species in Cylapus.

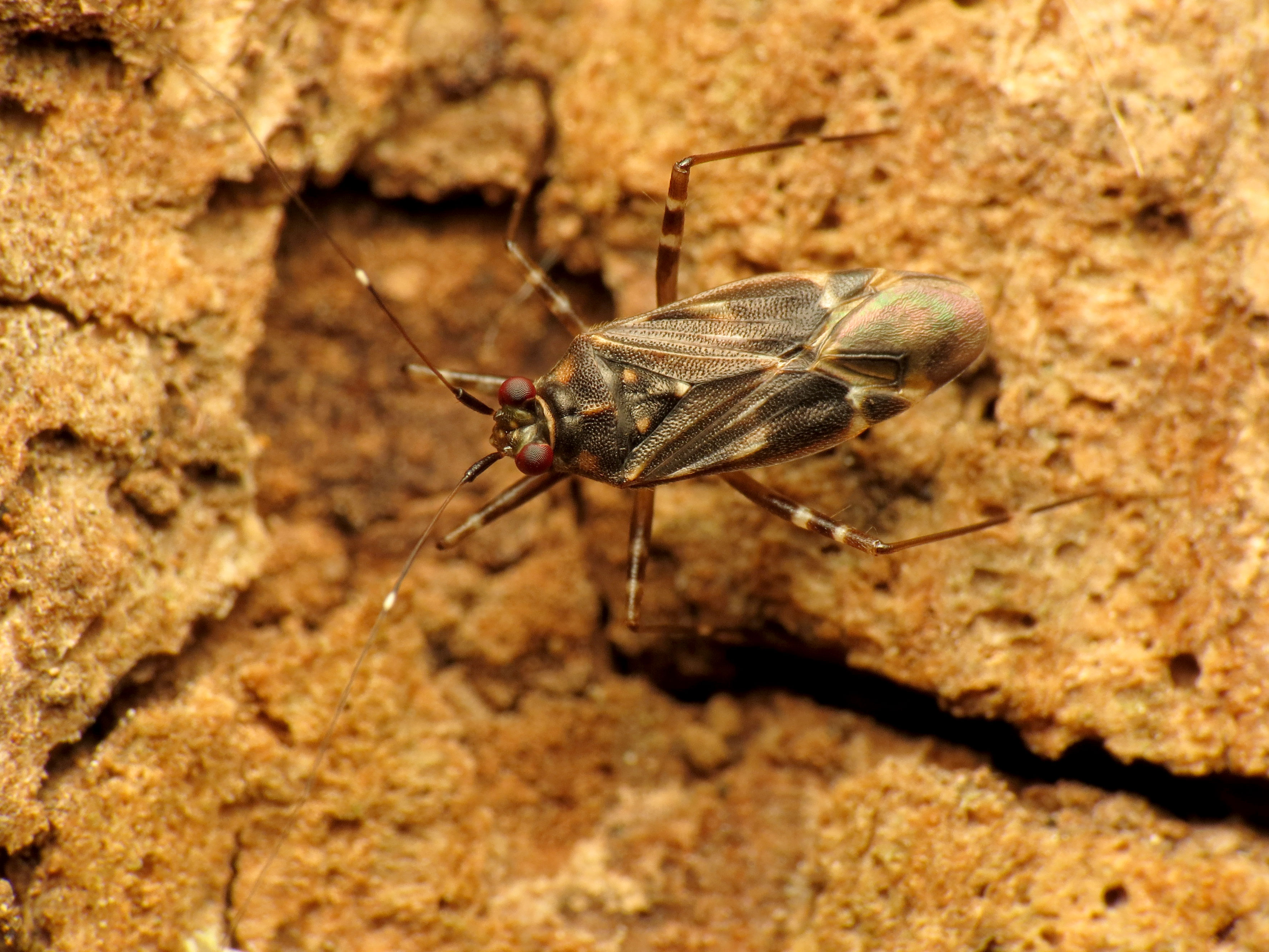
Cylapus tenuicornis

== Species ==
These 12 species belong to the genus Cylapus:

- Cylapus brasiliensis Carvalho, 1986
- Cylapus citus Bergroth, 1922
- Cylapus clavicornis Poppius, 1909
- Cylapus famularis (Stål, 1862)
- Cylapus festinabundus Bergroth, 1922
- Cylapus funebris (Distant, 1883)
- Cylapus marginicollis (Distant, 1883)
- Cylapus nobilis Poppius, 1909
- Cylapus ruficeps Bergroth, 1922
- Cylapus stellatus (Distant, 1883)
- Cylapus striatus Reuter, 1907
- Cylapus tenuicornis (Say, 1832)
