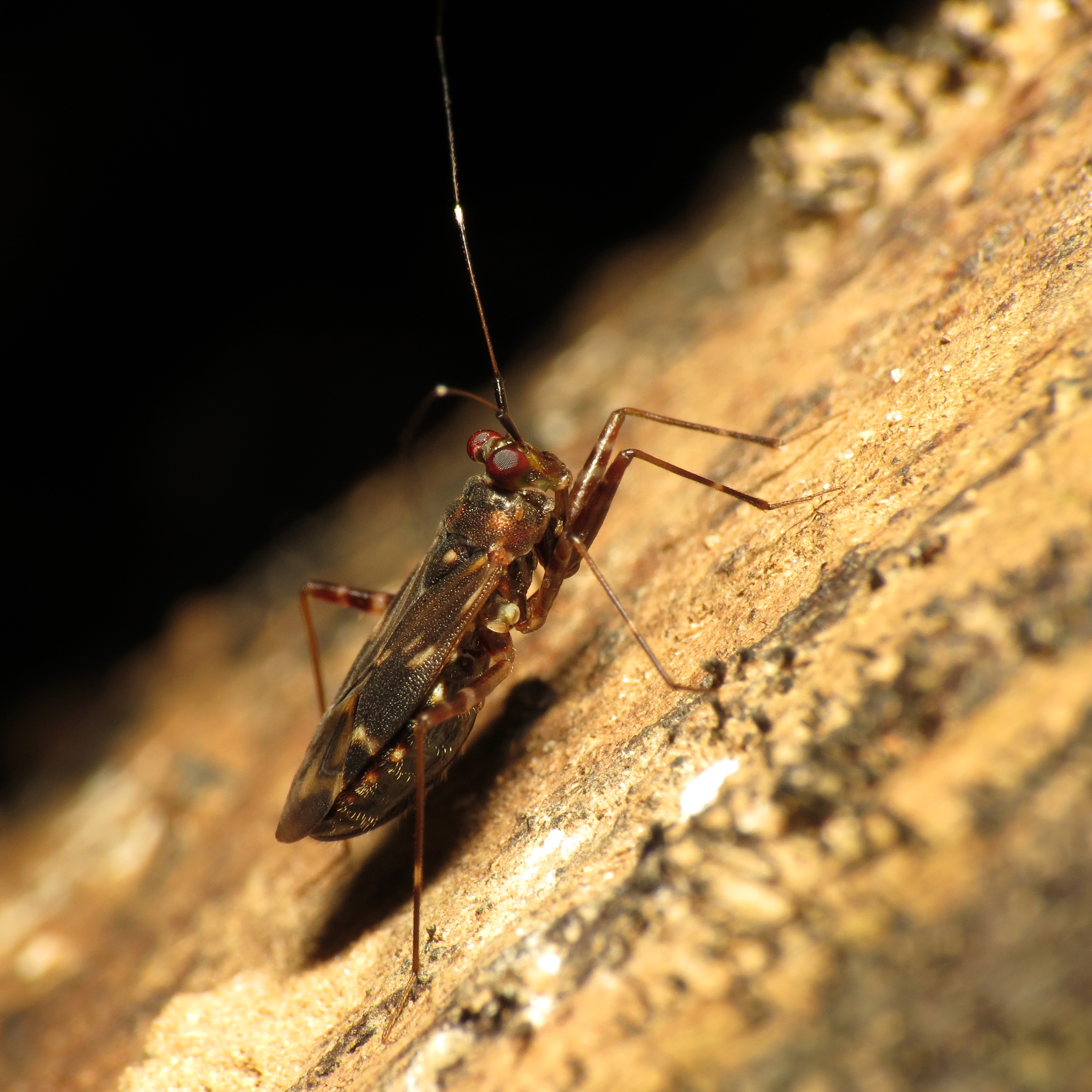

Scientific classification
- Domain: Eukaryota
- Kingdom: Animalia
- Phylum: Arthropoda
- Class: Insecta
- Order: Hemiptera
- Suborder: Heteroptera
- Family: Miridae
- Genus: Cylapus
- Species: C. tenuicornis

Binomial name
- Cylapus tenuicornis (Say, 1832)

Synonyms
- Capsus tenuicornis Say, 1832

= Cylapus tenuicornis =

Species of true bug

Cylapus tenuicornis is a species of plant bug in the family Miridae. It is found in North America.

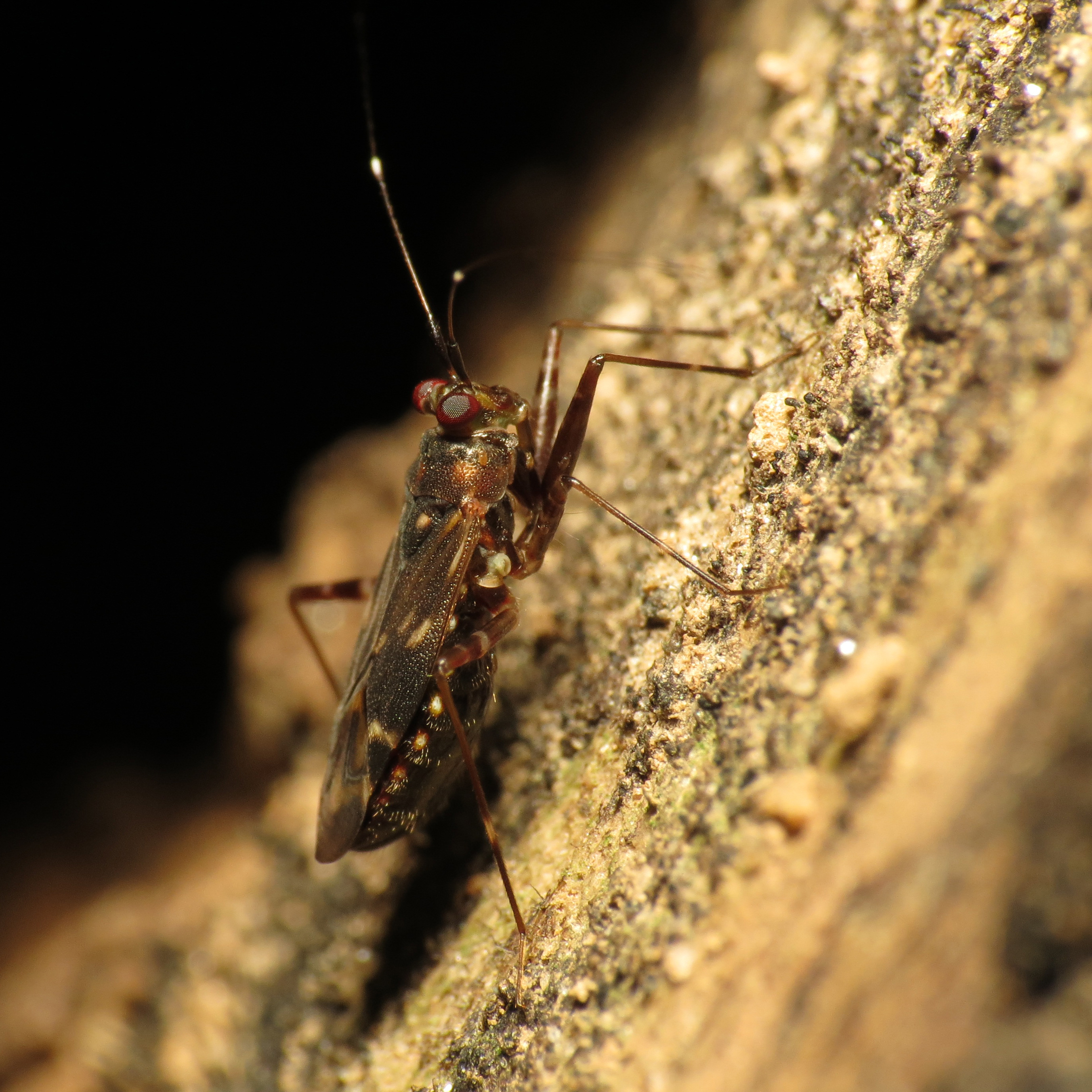

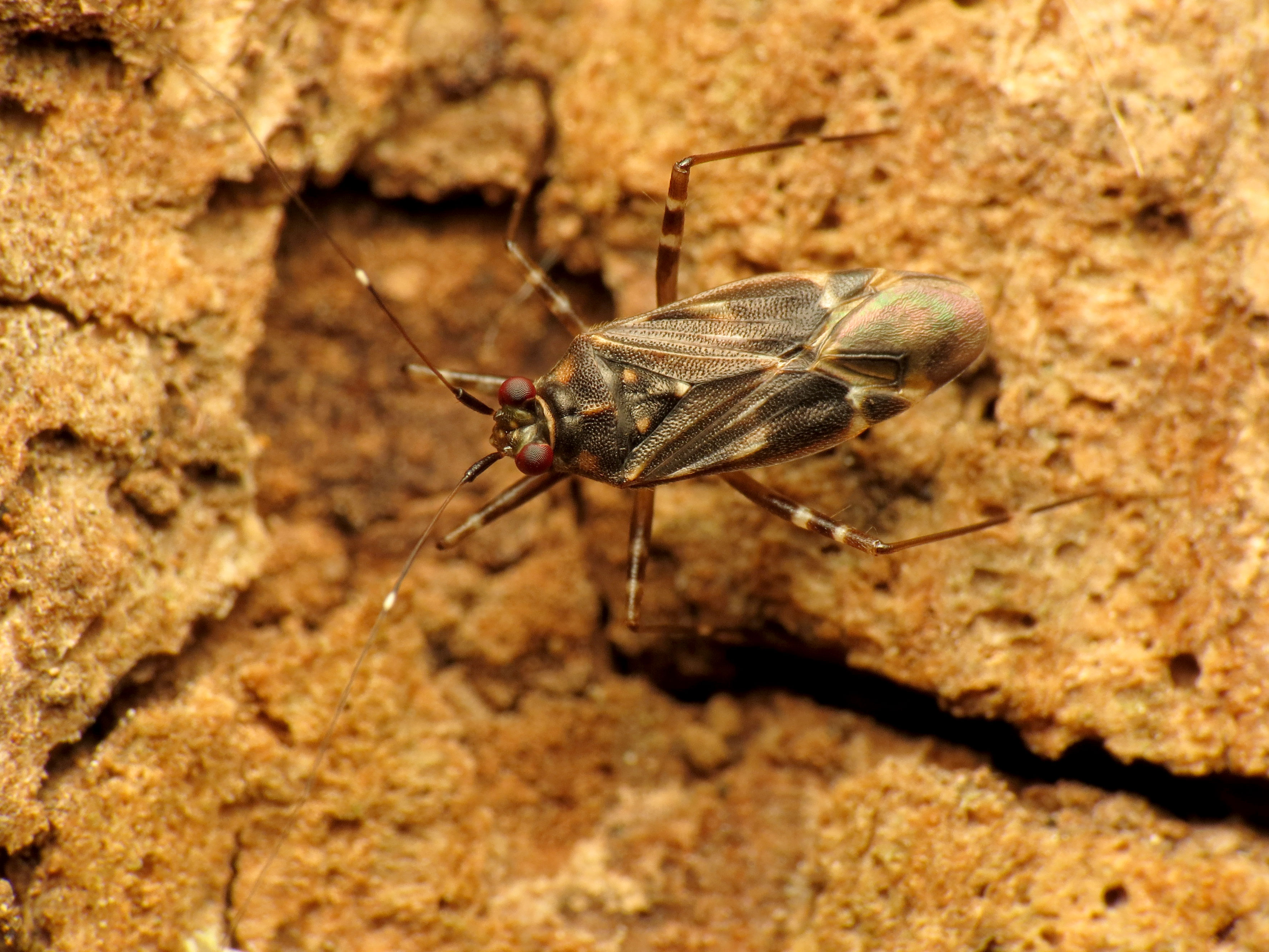
