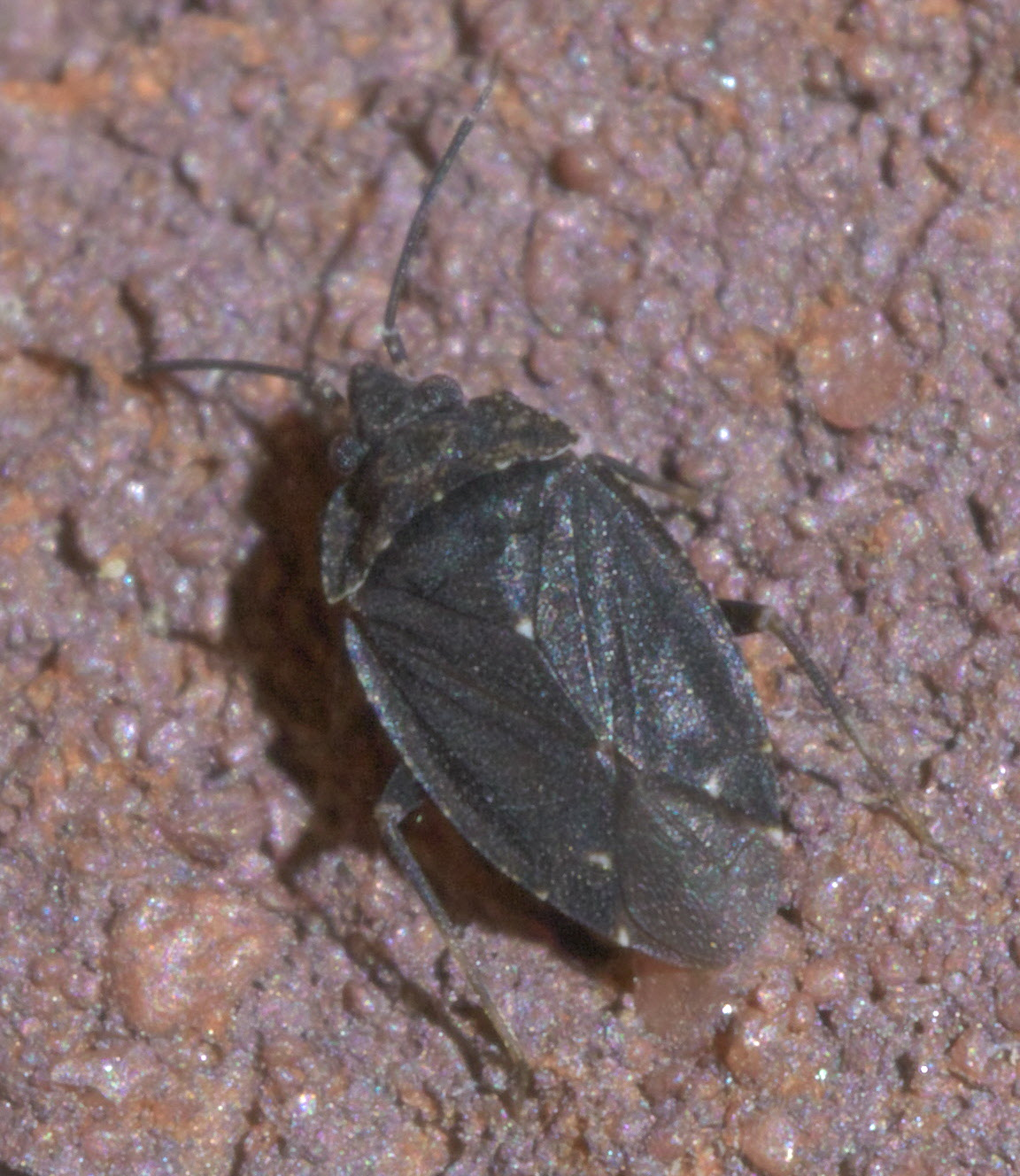

Scientific classification
- Kingdom: Animalia
- Phylum: Arthropoda
- Class: Insecta
- Order: Hemiptera
- Suborder: Heteroptera
- Family: Miridae
- Genus: Peritropis
- Species: P. saldaeformis

Binomial name
- Peritropis saldaeformis Uhler, 1891

= Peritropis saldaeformis =

Species of true bug

Peritropis saldaeformis is a species of plant bug in the family Miridae. It is found in North America.

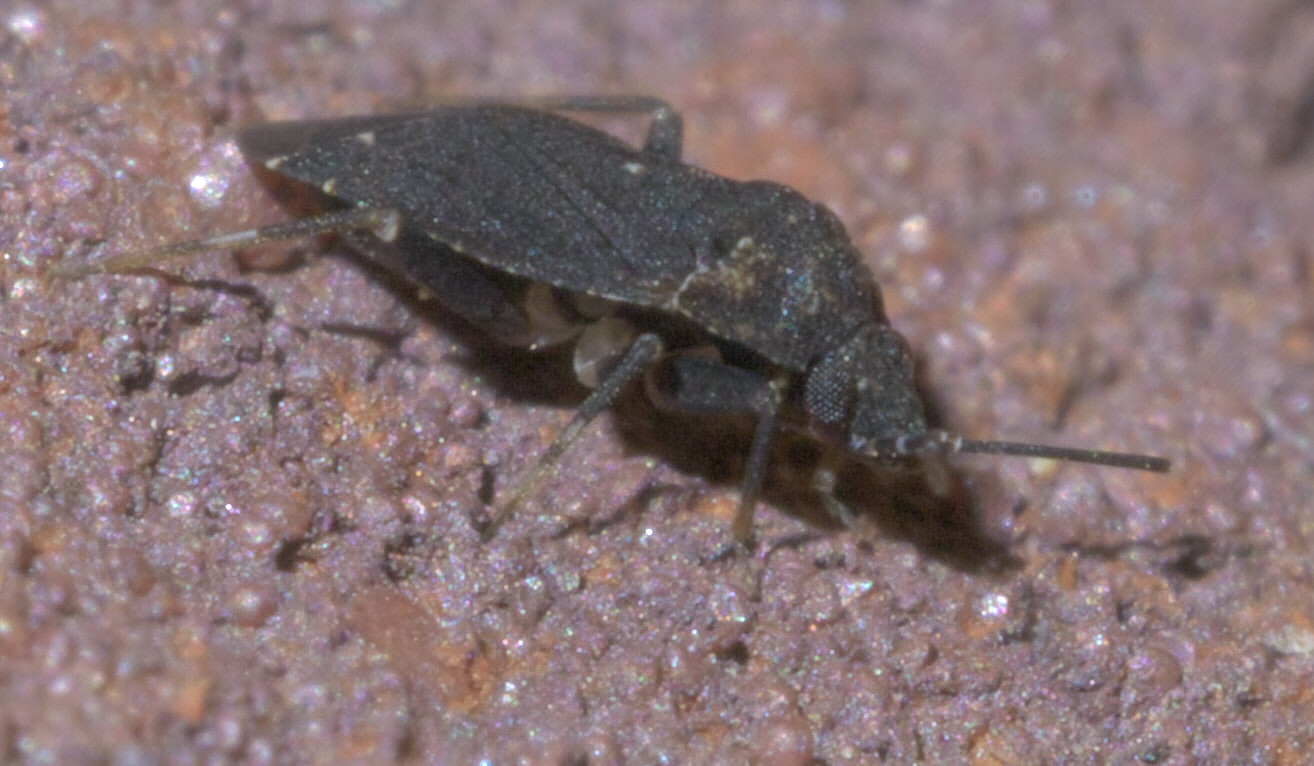
Peritropis saldaeformis, Pryor, OK, USA
