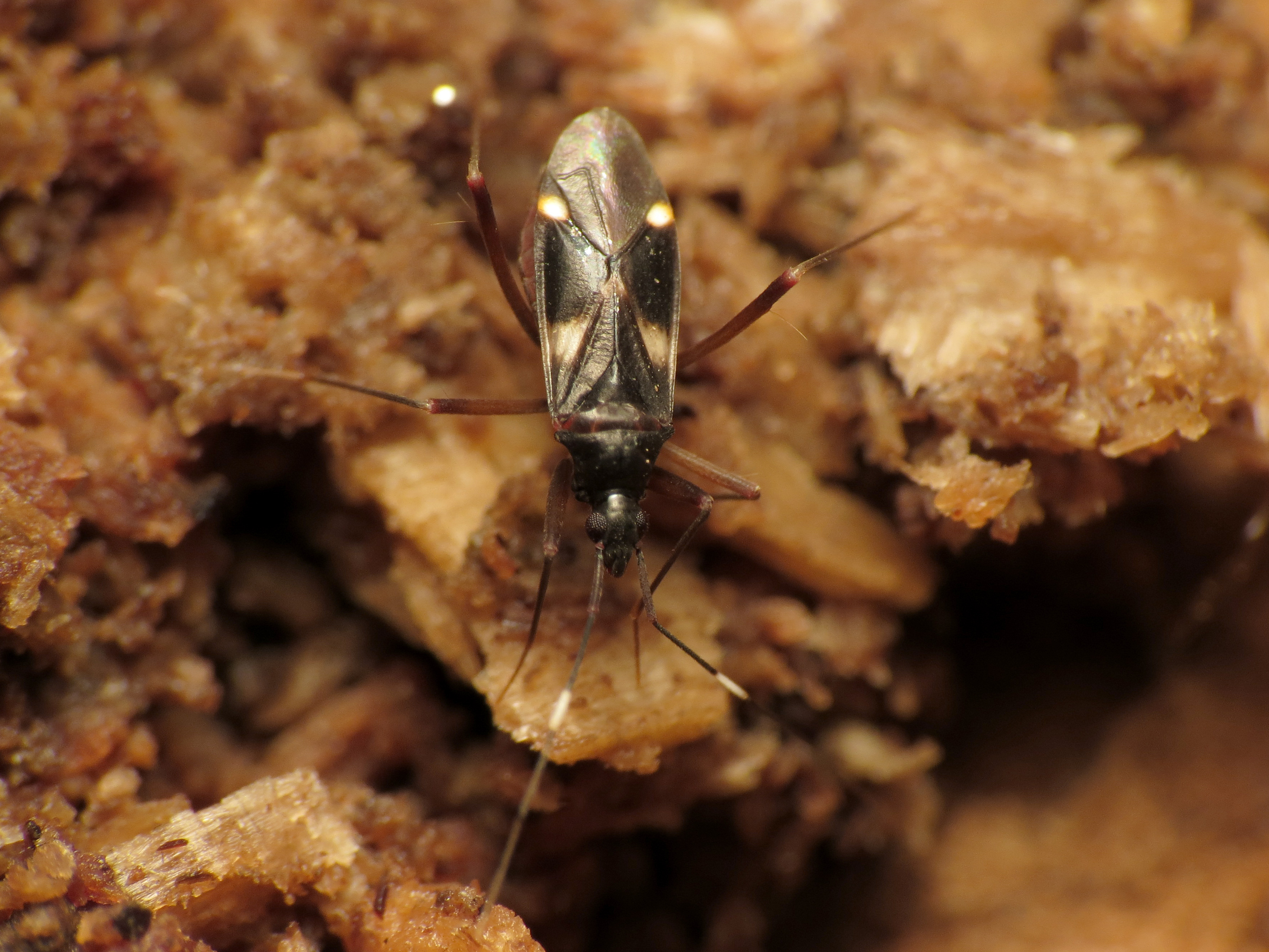

Scientific classification
- Domain: Eukaryota
- Kingdom: Animalia
- Phylum: Arthropoda
- Class: Insecta
- Order: Hemiptera
- Suborder: Heteroptera
- Family: Miridae
- Genus: Fulvius
- Species: F. imbecilis

Binomial name
- Fulvius imbecilis (Say, 1832)

= Fulvius imbecilis =

Species of true bug

Fulvius imbecilis is a species of plant bug in the family Miridae. It is found in North America.

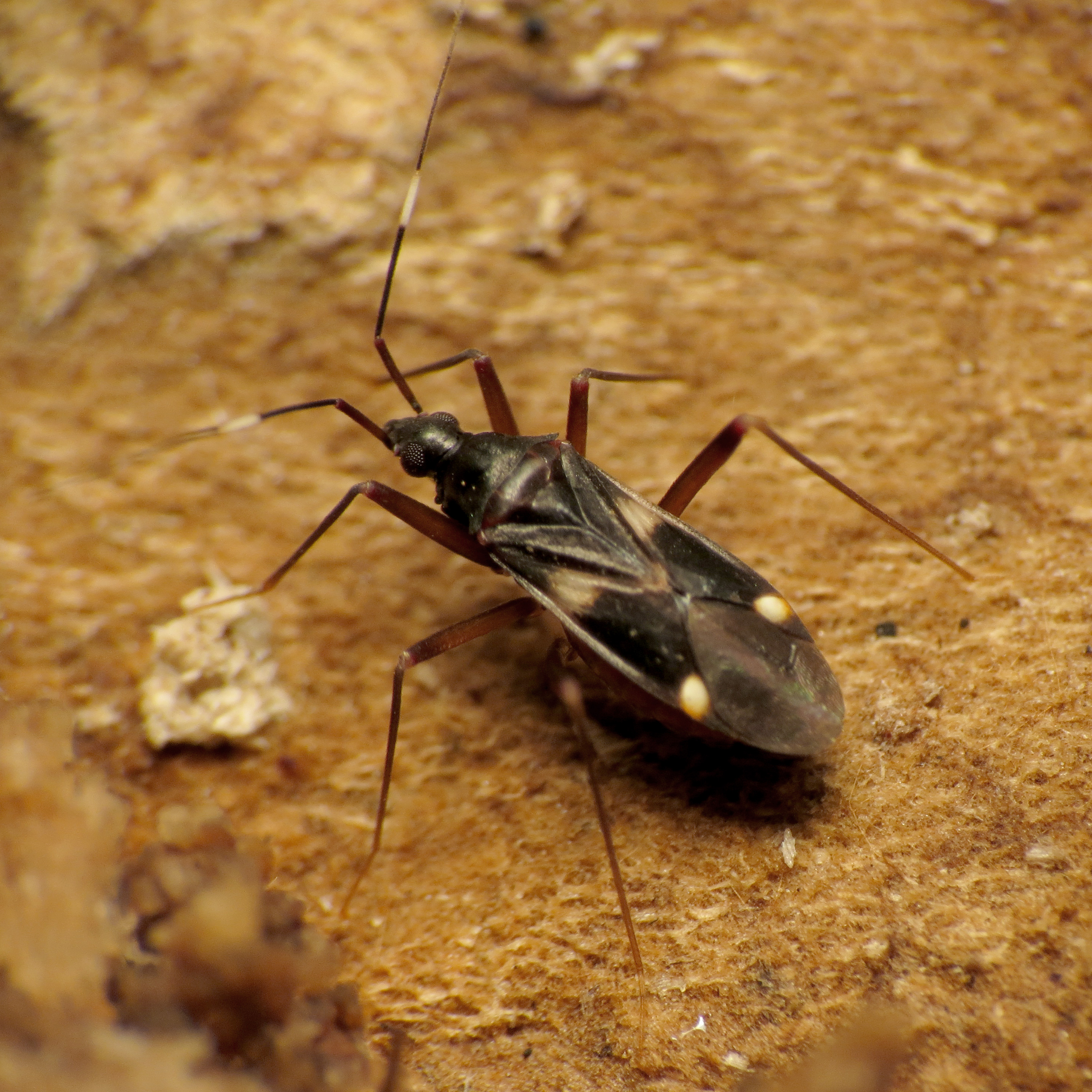

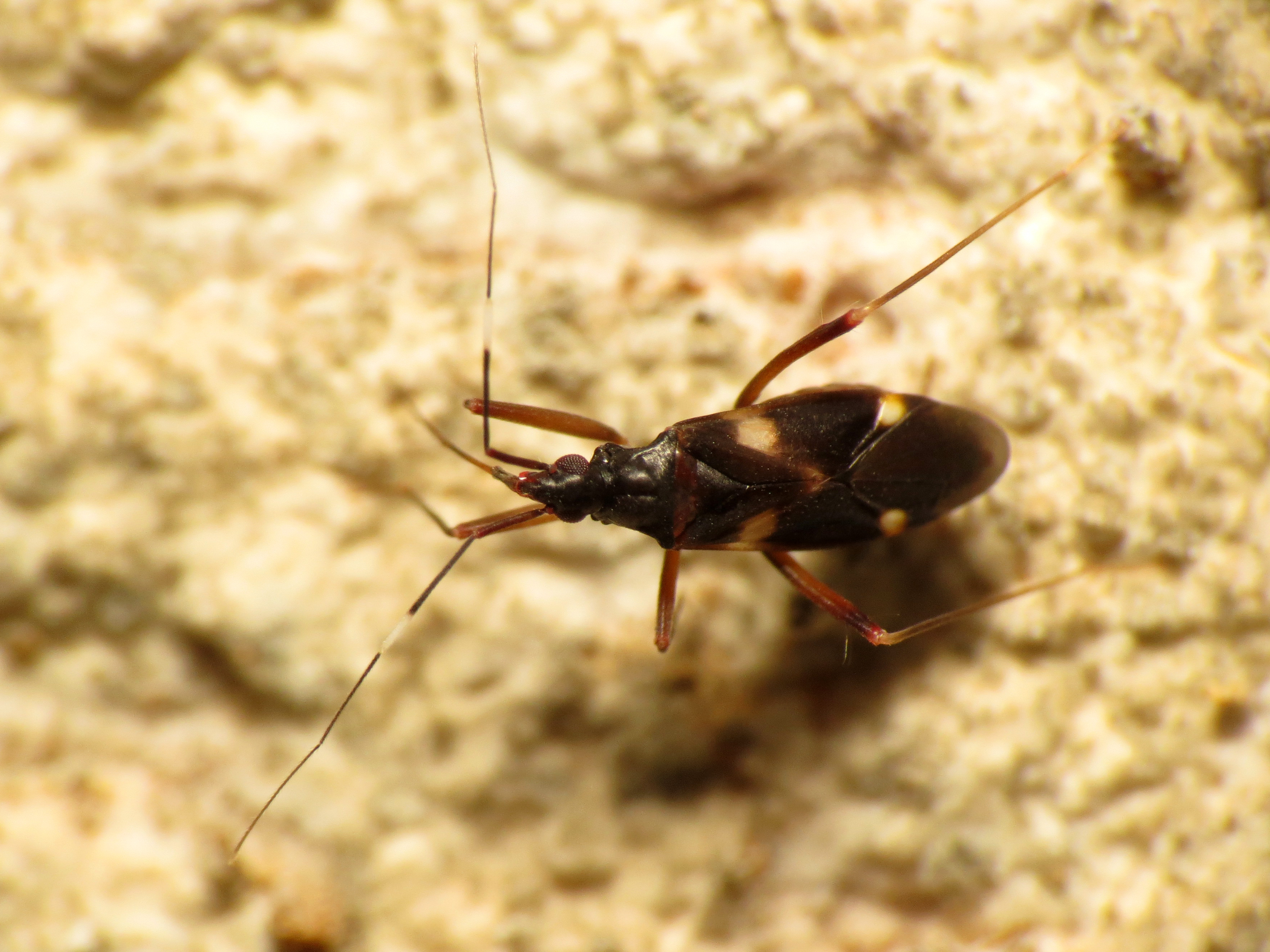
