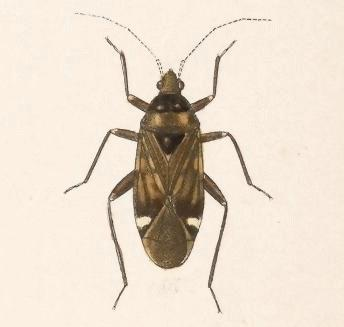
- Fulvius anthocorides

Scientific classification
- Kingdom: Animalia
- Phylum: Arthropoda
- Class: Insecta
- Order: Hemiptera
- Suborder: Heteroptera
- Family: Miridae
- Subfamily: Cylapinae
- Genus: Fulvius; Stal, 1862

Synonyms
- Camelocapsus Reuter, 1878; Pamerocoris Uhler, 1877; Silanus Distant, 1909; Teratodella Reuter, 1875

= Fulvius =

Genus of true bugs

Fulvius is a genus of plant bugs in the family Miridae. There are at least 90 described species in Fulvius, found on every continent except Antarctica.

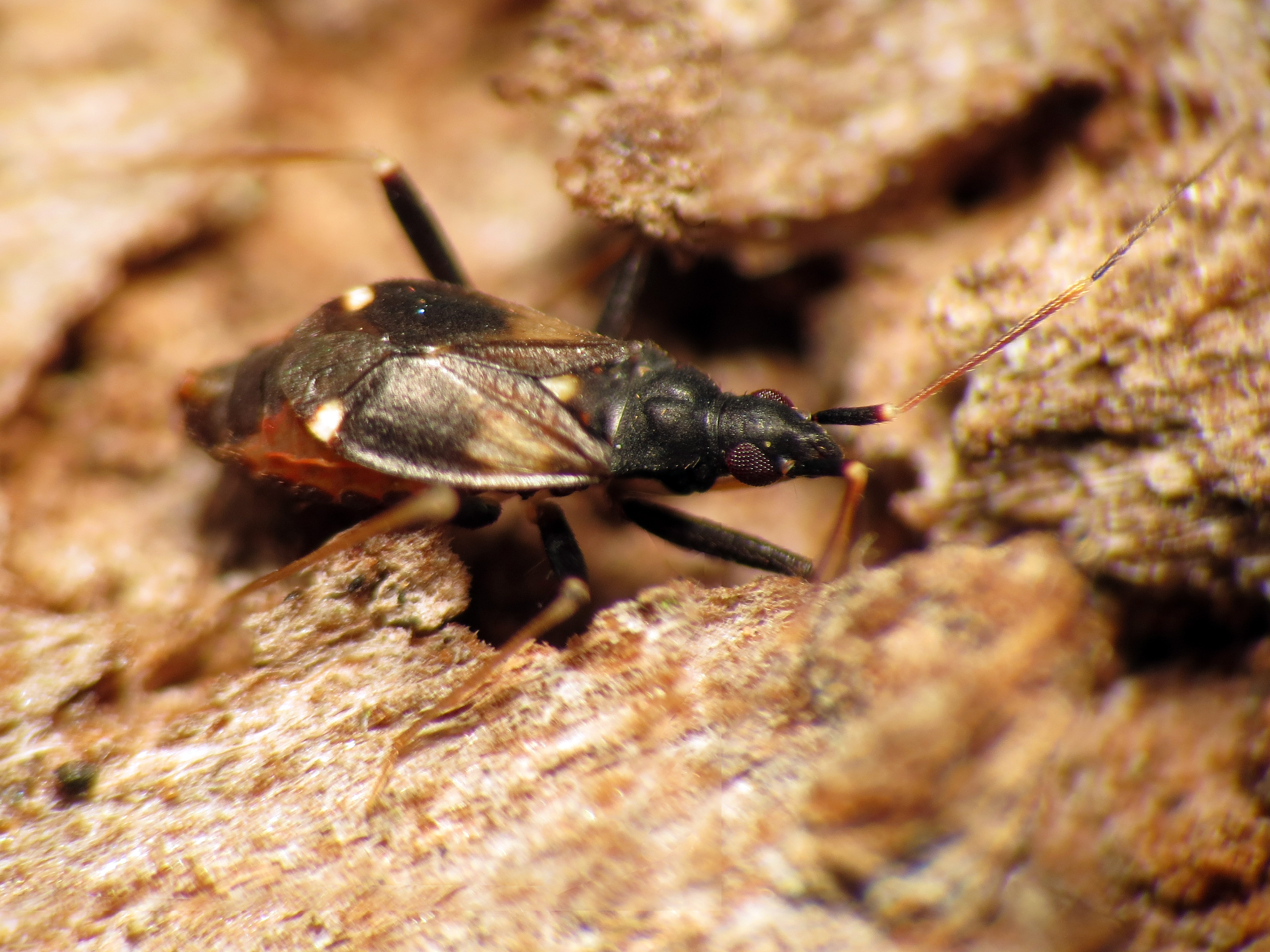
Fulvius slateri

== Species ==
These 91 species belong to the genus Fulvius:

- Fulvius albonotatus Carvalho, 1955
- Fulvius amapaensis Carvalho & Costa, 1994
- Fulvius anatolicus Çerçi & Gorczyca, 2021
- Fulvius angustatus Usinger, 1946
- Fulvius anthocorides Stal, 1862
- Fulvius anthocoroides (Reuter, 1875)
- Fulvius attenboroughi Maslowski, Taszakowski & Wolski, 2023
- Fulvius barrerai Carvalho & Costa, 1994
- Fulvius bidentatus (Jordan, 1944)
- Fulvius bifenestratus Poppius, 1909
- Fulvius bimaculatus Poppius, 1909
- Fulvius bisbistillatus (Stal, 1860)
- Fulvius bolivianus Carvalho & Costa, 1994
- Fulvius borgesi Cherot, Ribes, Gorczyca, 2006
- Fulvius breddini Reuter, 1902
- Fulvius brevipilis Poppius, 1915
- Fulvius brunneiceps Poppius, 1909
- Fulvius carayoni Pluot-Sigwalt & Chérot, 2013
- Fulvius carumbensis Carvalho & Costa, 1994
- Fulvius castaneus Carvalho, 1955
- Fulvius cavernus Hernandez & Henry, 2010
- Fulvius chaguenus Carvalho & Costa, 1994
- Fulvius chiriquinus Carvalho & Costa, 1994
- Fulvius colombianus Carvalho & Costa, 1994
- Fulvius constanti Gorczyca, 2004
- Fulvius costaricensis Carvalho & Costa, 1994
- Fulvius dallastai Gorczyca, 1998
- Fulvius dapensis Carvalho & Costa, 1994
- Fulvius dimidiatus Poppius, 1909
- Fulvius discifer Reuter, 1907
- Fulvius dubius Reuter, 1895
- Fulvius flaveolus Gorczyca, 1997
- Fulvius flavicornis Poppius, 1909
- Fulvius fuscans Distant, 1884
- Fulvius gamobensis Carvalho & Costa, 1994
- Fulvius geniculatus Van Duzee, 1933
- Fulvius guapimirinus Carvalho & Costa, 1994
- Fulvius henryi Wolski, Gorczyca & Yasunaga, 2018
- Fulvius imbecilis (Say, 1832)
- Fulvius itabiritensis Carvalho & Costa, 1994
- Fulvius jordii Carpintero & Chérot, 2011
- Fulvius kadapaensis Yeshwanth, Chérot, Gorczyca & Wolski, 2016
- Fulvius kajae Gorczyca, 2000
- Fulvius kerzhneri Gorczyca, 2000
- Fulvius lunulatus Uhler, 1894
- Fulvius macgillavryi Poppius, 1914
- Fulvius major Schmitz, 1970
- Fulvius malinalcanus Carvalho & Costa, 1994
- Fulvius mexicanus Carvalho & Costa, 1994
- Fulvius minimus Carvalho, 1988
- Fulvius morelensis Carvalho & Costa, 1994
- Fulvius nakatai Yasunaga & Miyamoto, 2006
- Fulvius nicaraguensis Carvalho & Costa, 1994
- Fulvius nigricornis Poppius, 1909
- Fulvius niveonotatus Yasunaga, 2000
- Fulvius nozawai Yasunaga & Wolski
- Fulvius obscuricornis Poppius, 1915
- Fulvius ornatifrons Carvalho, 1955
- Fulvius ornatifrontoides Carvalho & Costa, 1994
- Fulvius oxycarenoides (Reuter, 1878)
- Fulvius pallens Gorczyca, 2002
- Fulvius pallidus Poppius, 1909
- Fulvius paranaensis Ferreira & Henry, 2002
- Fulvius pictus Distant, 1913
- Fulvius praefectus (Distant, 1909)
- Fulvius puertoricensis Carvalho & Costa, 1994
- Fulvius quadristillatus (Stal, 1860)
- Fulvius satipoensis Carvalho & Costa, 1994
- Fulvius sigwaltae Gorczyca, 1998
- Fulvius simillimus Poppius, 1909
- Fulvius slateri Wheeler, 1977
- Fulvius spec Usinger, 1946
- Fulvius stillatipennis (Stal, 1860)
- Fulvius stysi Cherot & Gorczyca, 2008
- Fulvius submaculatus Poppius, 1909
- Fulvius subnitens Poppius, 1909
- Fulvius tagalicus Poppius, 1914
- Fulvius tanzanicus Gorczyca, 2000
- Fulvius thailandicus Sadowska-Woda & Gorczyca, 2003
- Fulvius thetis Carvalho & Costa, 1994
- Fulvius tumidipennis Wolski, Gorczyca & Yasunaga, 2018
- Fulvius tuxtlensis Carvalho & Costa, 1994
- Fulvius ullrichi Sadowska-Woda & Gorczyca, 2005
- Fulvius unicolor Poppius, 1909
- Fulvius ussuriensis Kerzhner, 1972
- Fulvius variegatus Poppius, 1909
- Fulvius venezuelanus Carvalho & Costa, 1994
- Fulvius vicosensis Ferreira & Henry, 2002
- Fulvius webbi Gorczyca, 2000
- Fulvius yunnanicus Gorczyca, Wolski & Taszakowski, 2020
