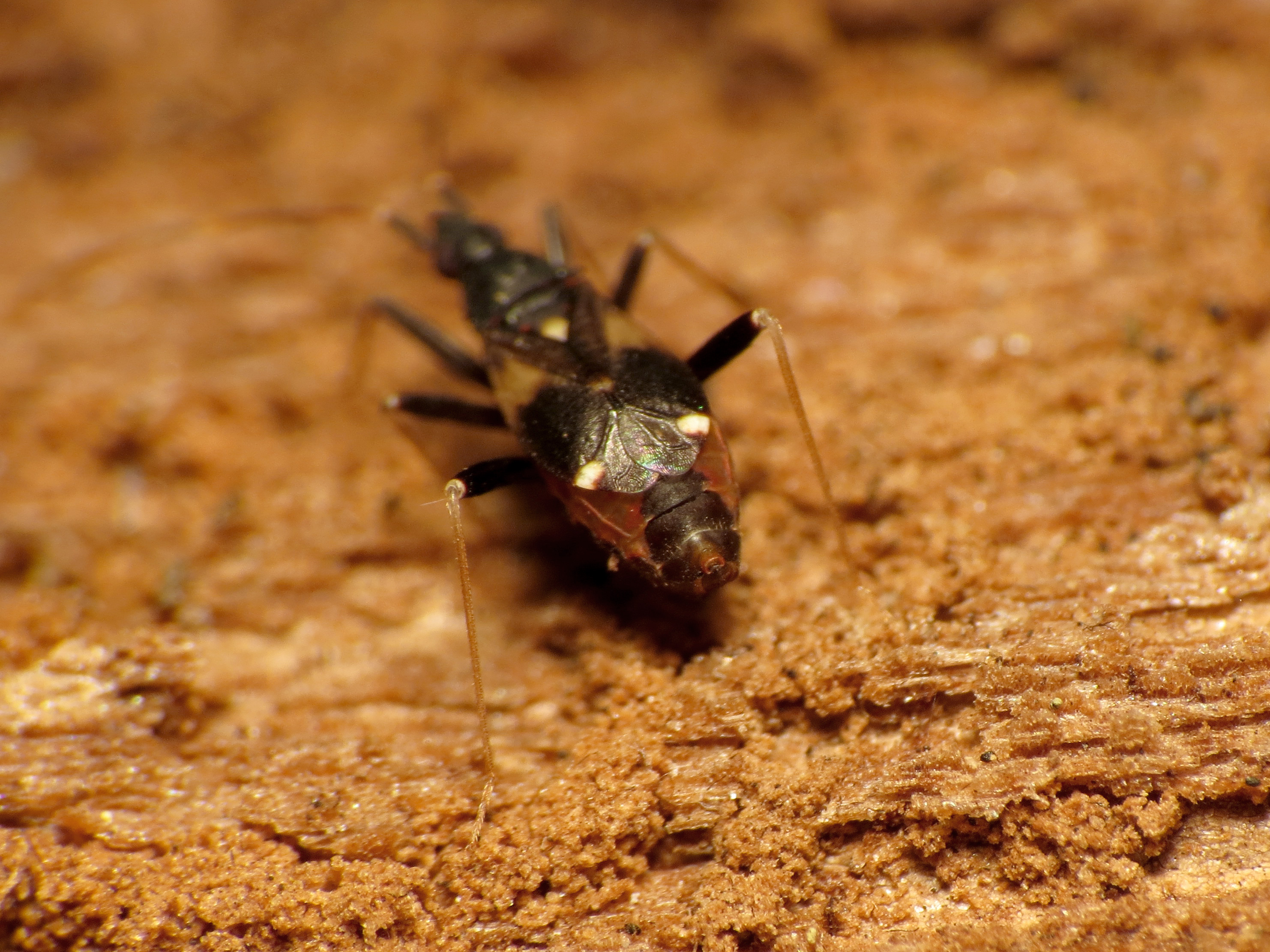

Scientific classification
- Domain: Eukaryota
- Kingdom: Animalia
- Phylum: Arthropoda
- Class: Insecta
- Order: Hemiptera
- Suborder: Heteroptera
- Family: Miridae
- Genus: Fulvius
- Species: F. slateri

Binomial name
- Fulvius slateri Wheeler, 1977

= Fulvius slateri =

Species of true bug

Fulvius slateri is a species of plant bug in the family Miridae. It is found in Central America and North America.

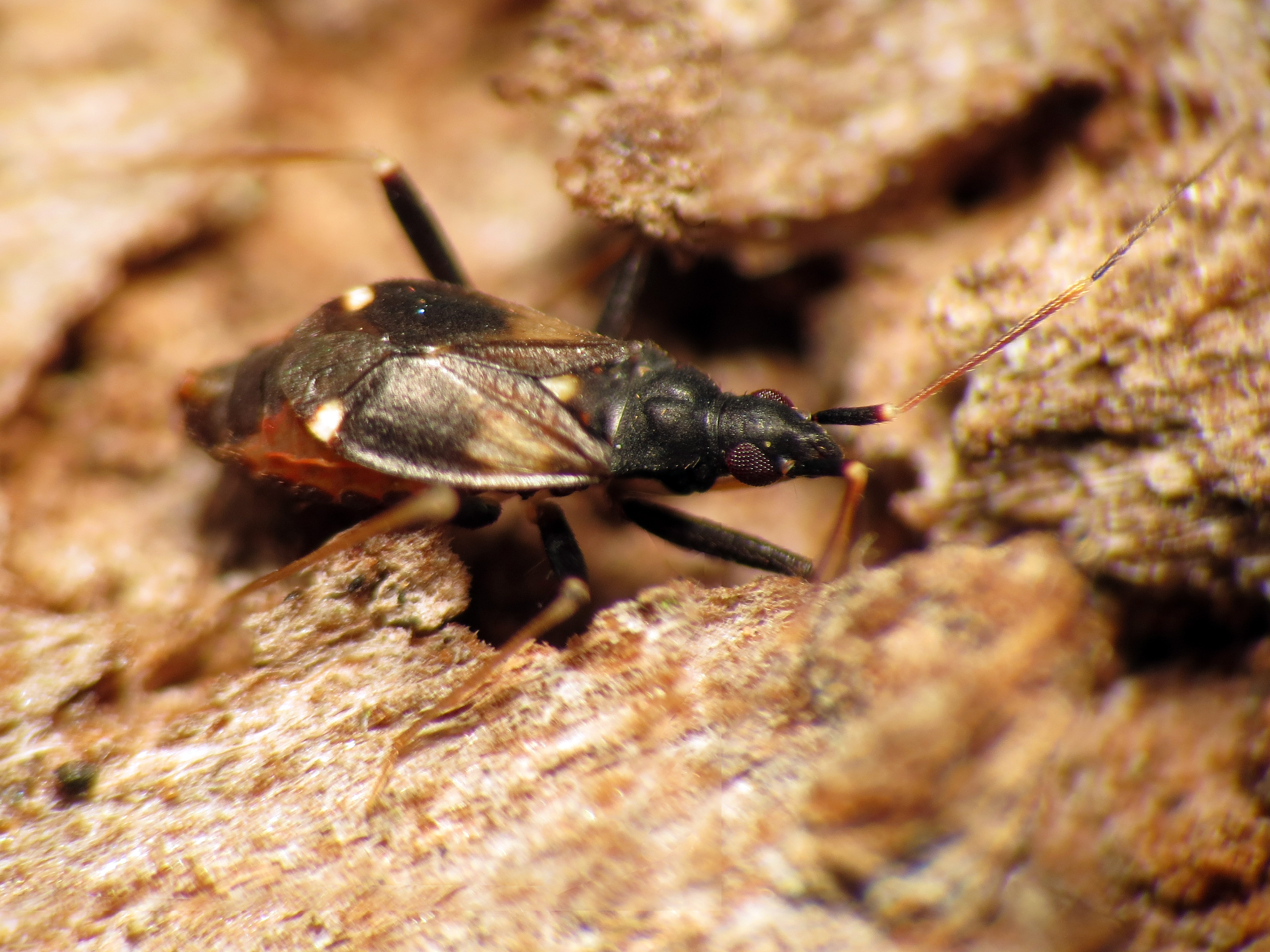
