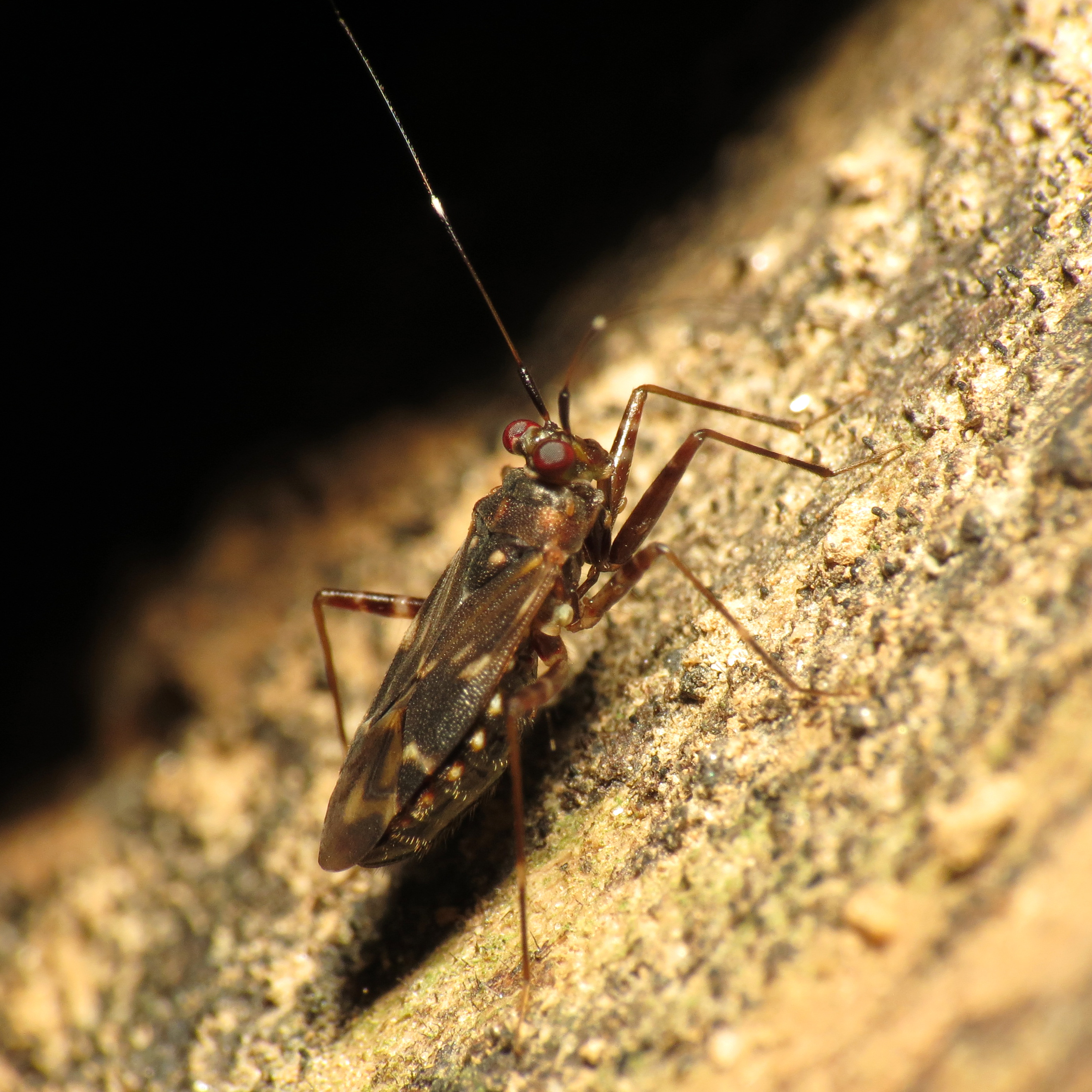
- Cylapus tenuicornis

Scientific classification
- Domain: Eukaryota
- Kingdom: Animalia
- Phylum: Arthropoda
- Class: Insecta
- Order: Hemiptera
- Suborder: Heteroptera
- Family: Miridae
- Subfamily: Cylapinae; Kirkaldy, 1903

Tribes
- Cylapini; Fulviini; Bothriomirini; Rhinomirini; Vaniini

= Cylapinae =

Subfamily of true bugs

Cylapinae is a subfamily of plant bugs. Bugs in this group tend to forage actively on fungus covered rotten logs in humid tropical forests.

== Overview of genera ==
- Adcylapocoris
- Afrobothriomiris
- Afrofulvius
- Afrovannius
- Amapacylapus
- Amberofulvius
- Ambocylapus
- Aragocylapus
- Austrovannius
- Bakeriola
- Bironiella
- Bothriomiris
- Brachyfulvius
- Carvalhoma
- Ceratofulvius
- Comefulvius
- Corcovadocola
- Cylapinus
- Cylapocerus
- Cylapocorella
- Cylapocoris
- Cylapocorisca
- Cylapocoroides
- Cylapofulvius
- Cylapoides
- Cylapomorpha
- Cylapus
- Dashymenia
- Dashymeniella
- Duckecylapus
- Epigonomiris
- Euchilofulvius
- Fulvidius
- Fulviella
- Fulvioaustrus
- Fulvius
- Germarofulvius
- Gulacylapus
- Hemiophthalmocoris
- Howefulvius
- Incafulvius
- Jordanofulvius
- Kanakamiris
- Leprocapsus
- Lygaeoscytus
- Microcylapus
- Microfulvius
- Mimofulvius
- Mycetocylapus
- Oligocoris
- Orasus
- Paracylapus
- Pararhinomiris
- Peltidocylapus
- Peritropella
- Peritropis
- Peritropisca
- Peritropoides
- Phyllocylapus
- Phyllofulvidius
- Phyllofulvius
- Popoviana
- Proamblia
- Punctifulvius
- Rewafulvius
- Rhinocylapidius
- Rhinocylapoides
- Rhinocylapus
- Rhinofulvius
- Rhinomiriella
- Rhinomiridius
- Rhinomiris
- Rhinophrus
- Rhyparochromomiris
- Schizopteromiris
- Schmitzofulvius
- Stysiofulvius
- Sulawesifulvius
- Teratofulvidius
- Teratofulvioides
- Teratofulvius
- Trynocoris
- Tucuruisca
- Umboiella
- Valdasoides
- Valdasus
- Vanniopsis
- Vannius
- Vanniusoides
- Xenocylapidius
- Xenocylapus
- Yamatofulvius
- ?Mangalcoris
- †Ambercylapus
- †Archeofulvius
- †Balticofulvius
