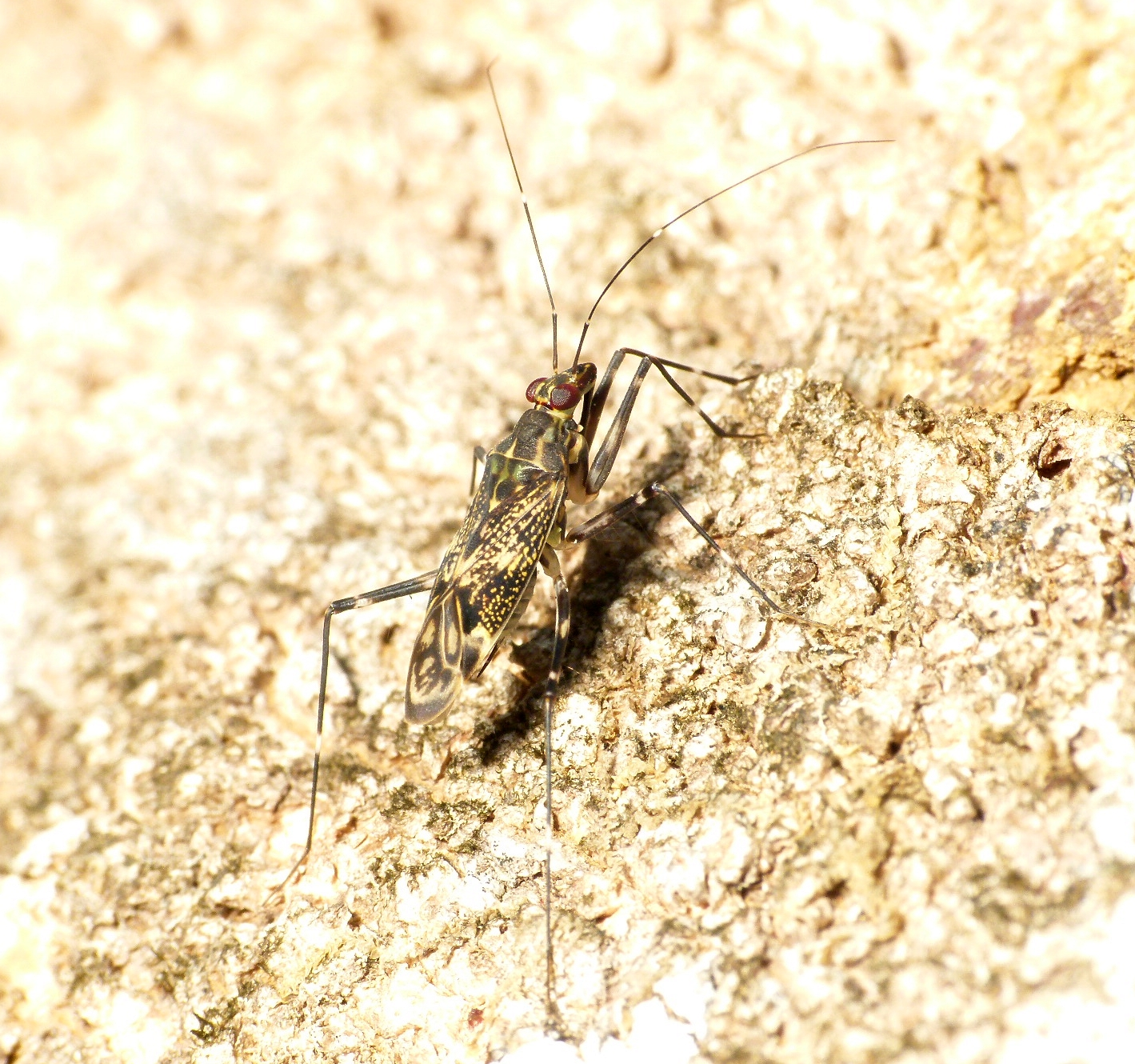
- Rhinomiris prathapani from the Western Ghats

Scientific classification
- Kingdom: Animalia
- Phylum: Arthropoda
- Clade: Pancrustacea
- Class: Insecta
- Order: Hemiptera
- Suborder: Heteroptera
- Family: Miridae
- Subfamily: Cylapinae
- Genus: Rhinomiris; Kirkaldy, 1902

Type species
- Capsus vicarius Walker, 1873

Synonyms
- Psilorhamphocoris Kirkaldy, 1903; Psilorrhamphus Stal, 1871

= Rhinomiris =

Genus of insects

Rhinomiris is a genus of plant bugs in the family Miridae. There are about 10–20 species in the genus distribution mainly in tropical Southeast Asia and a few species in South Asia. They were placed in the tribe Rhinomirini of the subfamily Cylapinae along with Rhinocylapus and Rhinomiriella, but a phylogenetic analysis of the tribe showed non-monophyly and the only genus now retained in Rhinomirini is Rhinomirus.

- Rhinomiris camelus Poppius, 1909
- Rhinomiris conspersus (Stal, 1871)
- Rhinomiris consputus (Stal, 1871)
- Rhinomiris dentatus (Gorczyca and Cherot, 1998)
- Rhinomiris donisi (Gorczyca and Cherot, 1998)
- Rhinomiris henryi Gorczyca and Cherot, 1998
- Rhinomiris insularis Hsiao, 1944
- Rhinomiris intermedius Poppius, 1909
- Rhinomiris janetknightae Gorczyca and Cherot, 1998
- Rhinomiris ogoouensis (Odhiambo, 1967)
- Rhinomiris prathapani Yeshwanth, Chérot, Gorczyca, Wolski, 2016
- Rhinomiris schaeferi Gorczyca and Cherot, 1998
- Rhinomiris vicarius (Walker, 1873)
