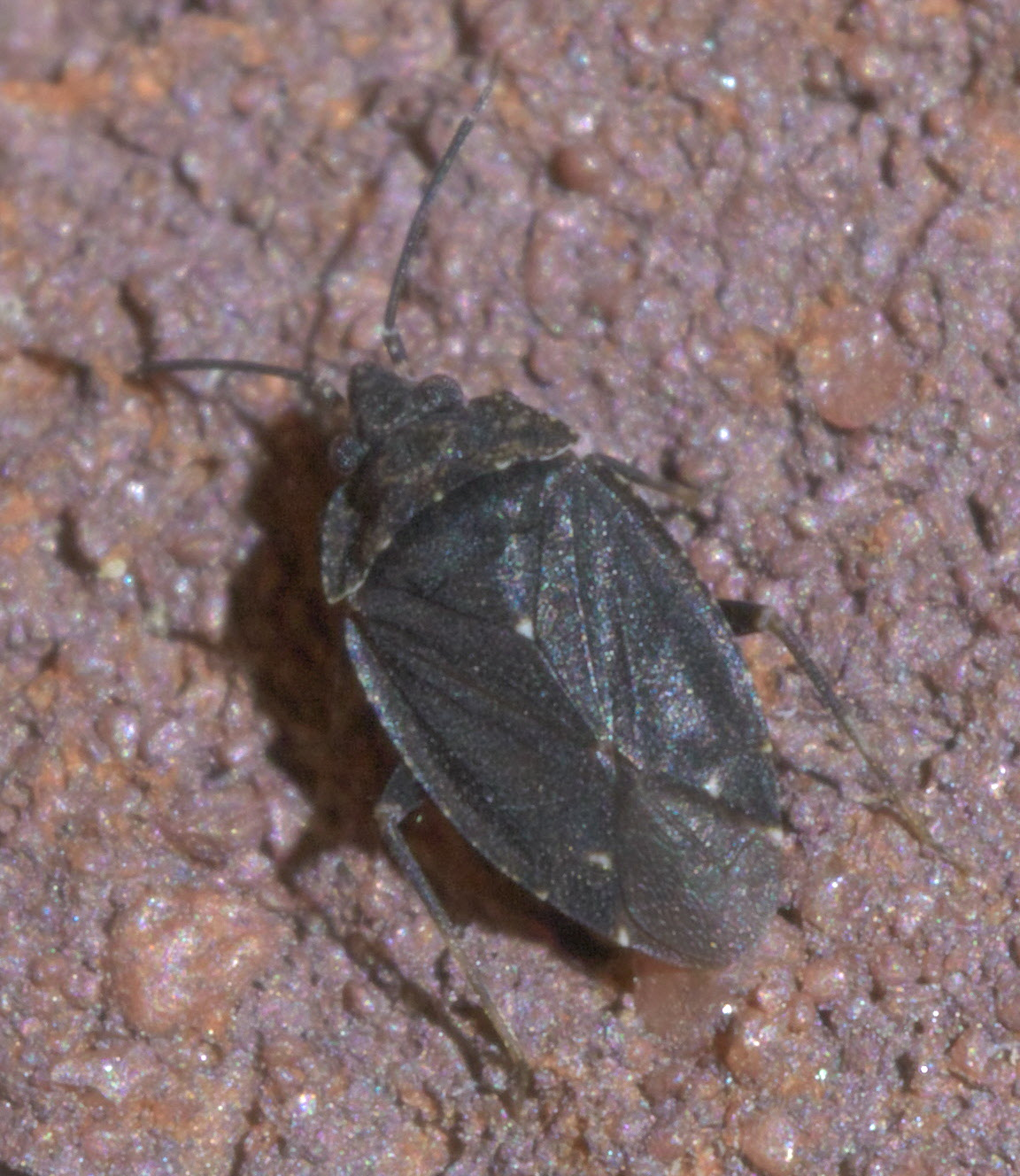
- Peritropis saldaeformis

Scientific classification
- Kingdom: Animalia
- Phylum: Arthropoda
- Class: Insecta
- Order: Hemiptera
- Suborder: Heteroptera
- Family: Miridae
- Subfamily: Cylapinae
- Genus: Peritropis; Uhler, 1891

= Peritropis =

Genus of true bugs

Peritropis is a genus of plant bugs in the family Miridae. There are 94 described species in Peritropis.

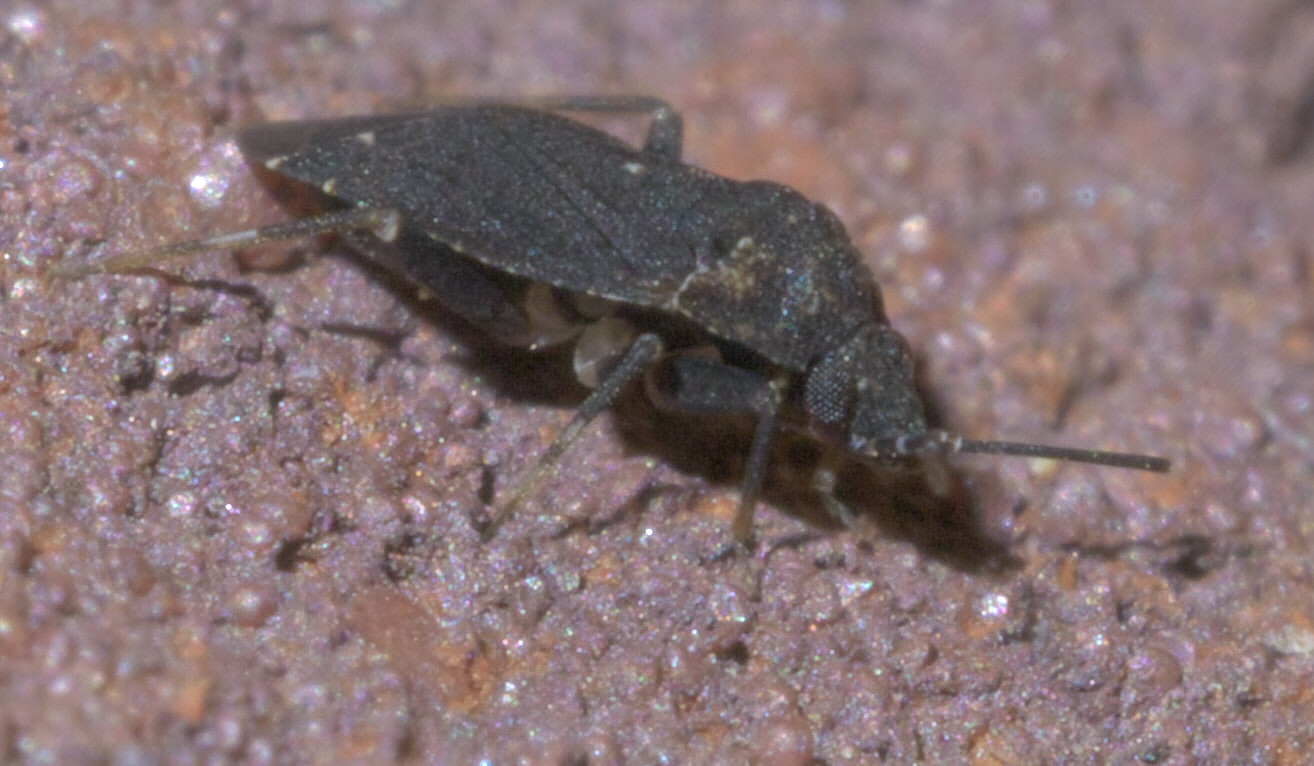
Peritropis saldaeformis

== Species ==
- Peritropis advena Kerzhner, 1973
- Peritropis ahmadsahae, Wolski and Taszakowsk, 2024
- Peritropis gorczycai, Chérot, Damken, and Taszakowski, 2024
- Peritropis ubdiber, Wolski and Taszakowsk, 2024
- Peritropis wolskii, Chérot, Damken, and Taszakowski, 2024,
- Peritropis husseyi Knight, 1923
- Peritropis saldaeformis Uhler, 1891
