= Pycnoderes dilatatus =

Scientific classification
- Domain: Eukaryota
- Kingdom: Animalia
- Phylum: Arthropoda
- Class: Insecta
- Order: Hemiptera
- Suborder: Heteroptera
- Family: Miridae
- Tribe: Eccritotarsini
- Genus: Pycnoderes
- Species: P. dilatatus

Binomial name
- Pycnoderes dilatatus Reuter, 1909

Species of true bug

Pycnoderes dilatatus is a species of plant bug in the family Miridae. It is found in North America.
