= Caulotops distanti =

Scientific classification
- Domain: Eukaryota
- Kingdom: Animalia
- Phylum: Arthropoda
- Class: Insecta
- Order: Hemiptera
- Suborder: Heteroptera
- Family: Miridae
- Tribe: Eccritotarsini
- Genus: Caulotops
- Species: C. distanti

Binomial name
- Caulotops distanti (Reuter, 1905)

Species of true bug

Caulotops distanti is a species of plant bug in the family Miridae. It is found in Central America, North America, and South America.
