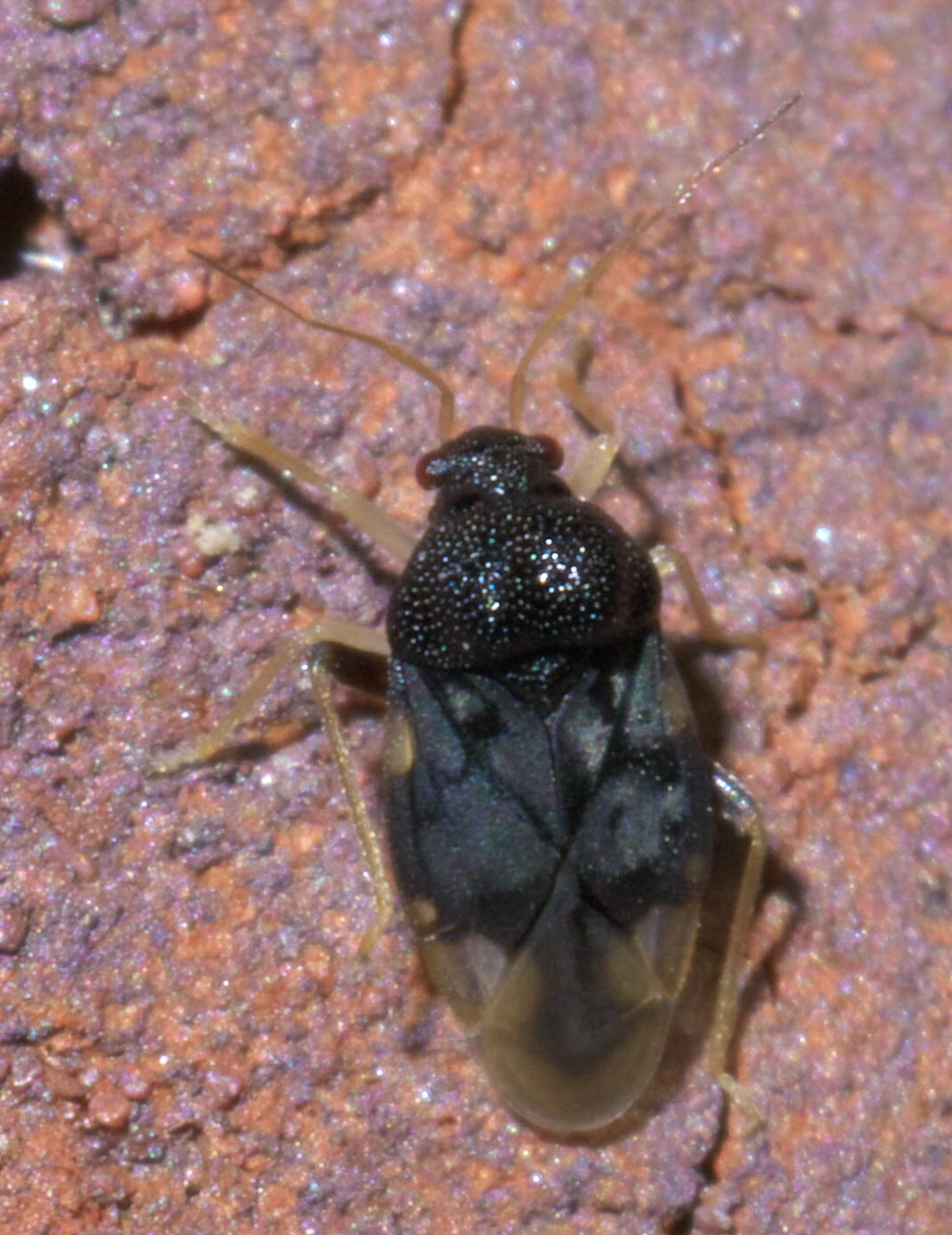

Scientific classification
- Domain: Eukaryota
- Kingdom: Animalia
- Phylum: Arthropoda
- Class: Insecta
- Order: Hemiptera
- Suborder: Heteroptera
- Family: Miridae
- Tribe: Eccritotarsini
- Genus: Pycnoderes
- Species: P. medius

Binomial name
- Pycnoderes medius Knight, 1926

= Pycnoderes medius =

Species of true bug

Pycnoderes medius is a species of plant bug in the family Miridae. It is found in North America.

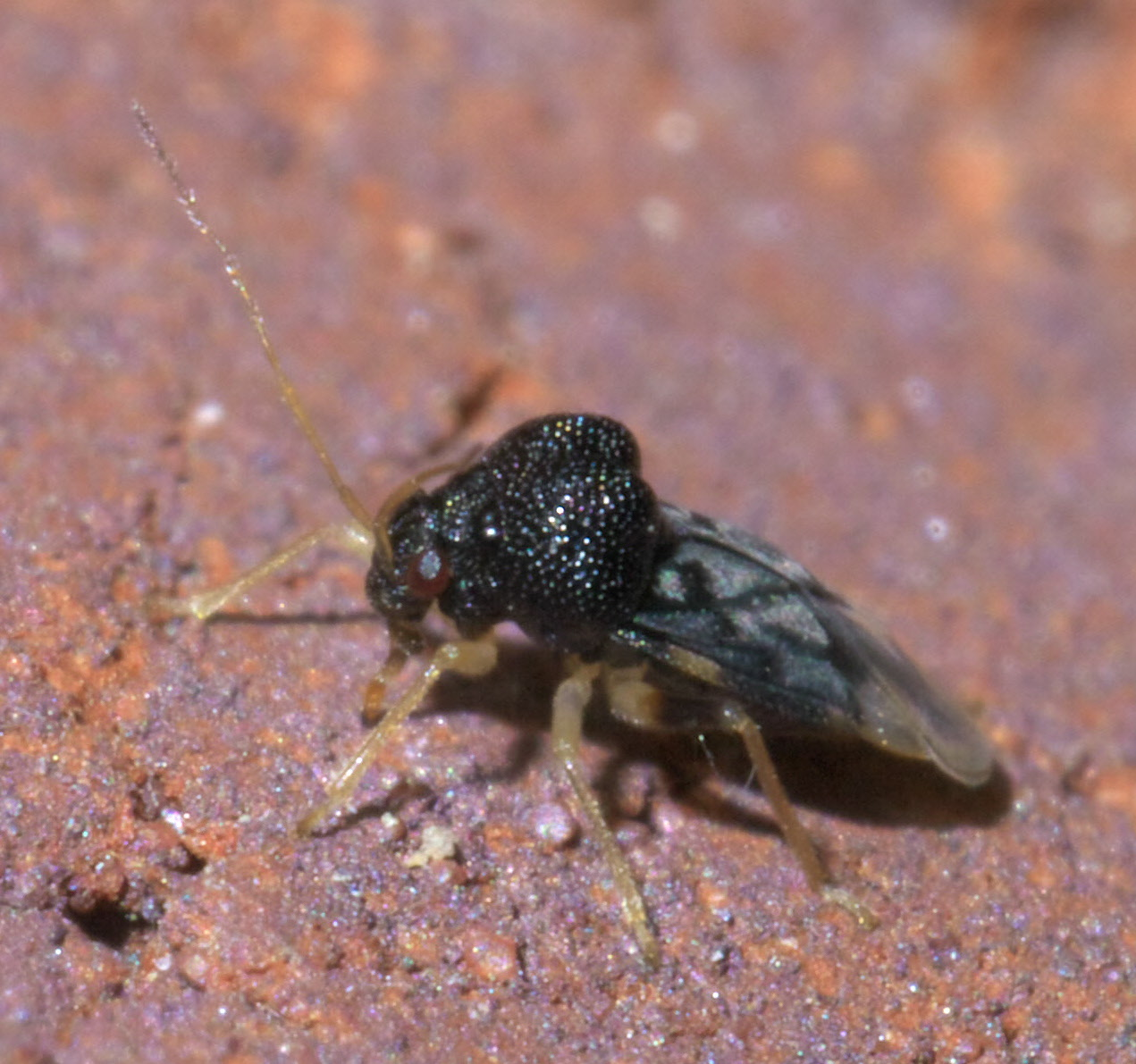
