= Pycnoderes quadrimaculatus =

Scientific classification
- Kingdom: Animalia
- Phylum: Arthropoda
- Clade: Pancrustacea
- Class: Insecta
- Order: Hemiptera
- Suborder: Heteroptera
- Family: Miridae
- Tribe: Eccritotarsini
- Genus: Pycnoderes
- Species: P. quadrimaculatus

Binomial name
- Pycnoderes quadrimaculatus Guérin-Méneville, 1857

Species of true bug

Pycnoderes quadrimaculatus, the bean capsid, is a species of plant bug in the family Miridae. It is found in the Caribbean Sea, Central America, North America, Oceania, and South America.
