= Sixeonotus areolatus =

Scientific classification
- Domain: Eukaryota
- Kingdom: Animalia
- Phylum: Arthropoda
- Class: Insecta
- Order: Hemiptera
- Suborder: Heteroptera
- Family: Miridae
- Tribe: Eccritotarsini
- Genus: Sixeonotus
- Species: S. areolatus

Binomial name
- Sixeonotus areolatus Knight, 1928

Species of true bug

Sixeonotus areolatus is a species of plant bug in the family Miridae. It is found in North America.
