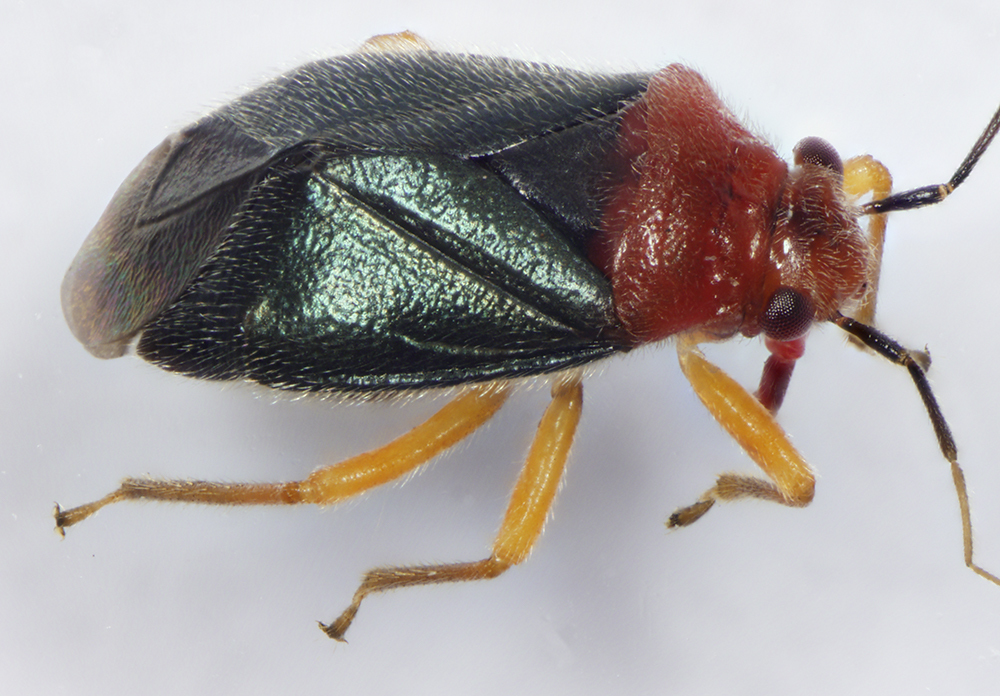

Scientific classification
- Domain: Eukaryota
- Kingdom: Animalia
- Phylum: Arthropoda
- Class: Insecta
- Order: Hemiptera
- Suborder: Heteroptera
- Family: Miridae
- Tribe: Eccritotarsini
- Genus: Halticotoma
- Species: H. valida

Binomial name
- Halticotoma valida Townsend, 1892

= Halticotoma valida =

Species of true bug

Halticotoma valida, the yucca plant bug, is a species of plant bug in the family Miridae. It is found in North America.

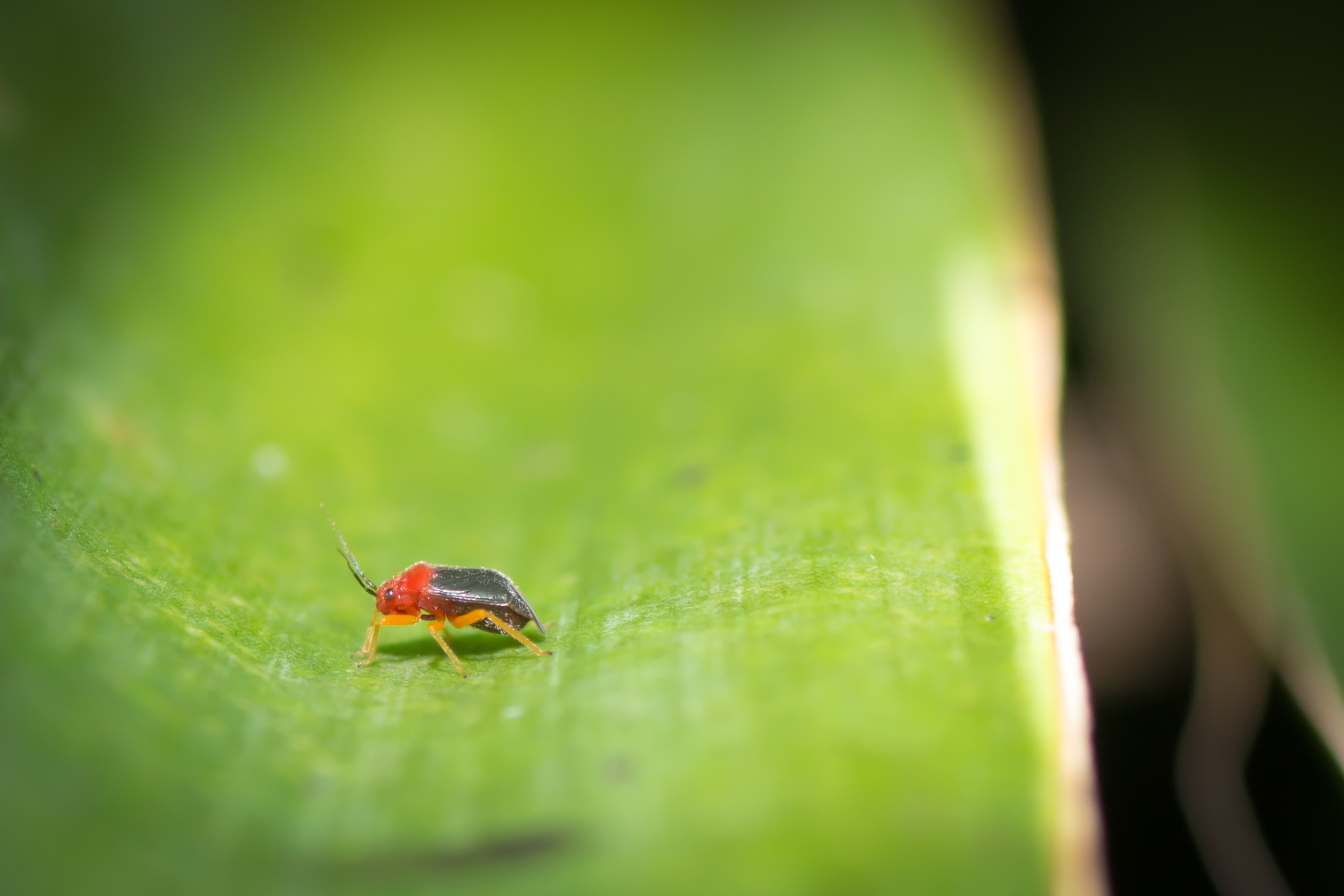
Yucca plant bug, Halticotoma valida
