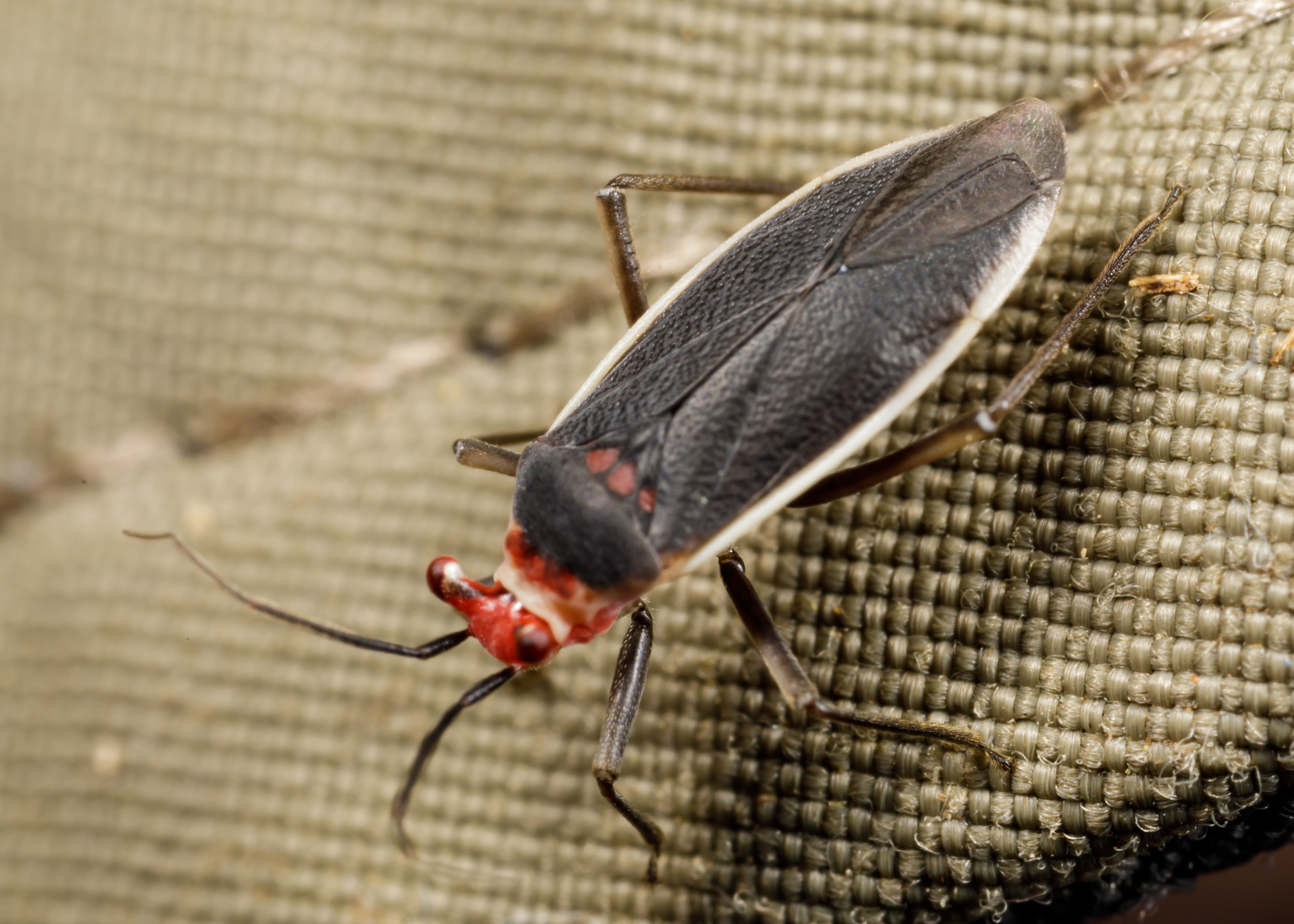

Scientific classification
- Domain: Eukaryota
- Kingdom: Animalia
- Phylum: Arthropoda
- Class: Insecta
- Order: Hemiptera
- Suborder: Heteroptera
- Family: Miridae
- Tribe: Eccritotarsini
- Genus: Hesperolabops
- Species: H. gelastops

Binomial name
- Hesperolabops gelastops Kirkaldy, 1902

= Hesperolabops gelastops =

Species of true bug

Hesperolabops gelastops, the cactus bug, is a species of plant bug in the family Miridae. It is found in Central America and North America.
