= Halticotoma nicholi =

Scientific classification
- Domain: Eukaryota
- Kingdom: Animalia
- Phylum: Arthropoda
- Class: Insecta
- Order: Hemiptera
- Suborder: Heteroptera
- Family: Miridae
- Tribe: Eccritotarsini
- Genus: Halticotoma
- Species: H. nicholi

Binomial name
- Halticotoma nicholi Knight, 1928

Species of true bug

Halticotoma nicholi is a species of plant bug in the family Miridae. It is found in North America.

== Subspecies ==
These two subspecies belong to the species Halticotoma nicholi:

- Halticotoma nicholi fulvicollis Knight, 1928
- Halticotoma nicholi nicholi Knight, 1928
