= Sixeonotus albicornis =

Scientific classification
- Domain: Eukaryota
- Kingdom: Animalia
- Phylum: Arthropoda
- Class: Insecta
- Order: Hemiptera
- Suborder: Heteroptera
- Family: Miridae
- Tribe: Eccritotarsini
- Genus: Sixeonotus
- Species: S. albicornis

Binomial name
- Sixeonotus albicornis Blatchley, 1926

Species of true bug

Sixeonotus albicornis is a species of plant bug in the family Miridae. It is found in North America.
