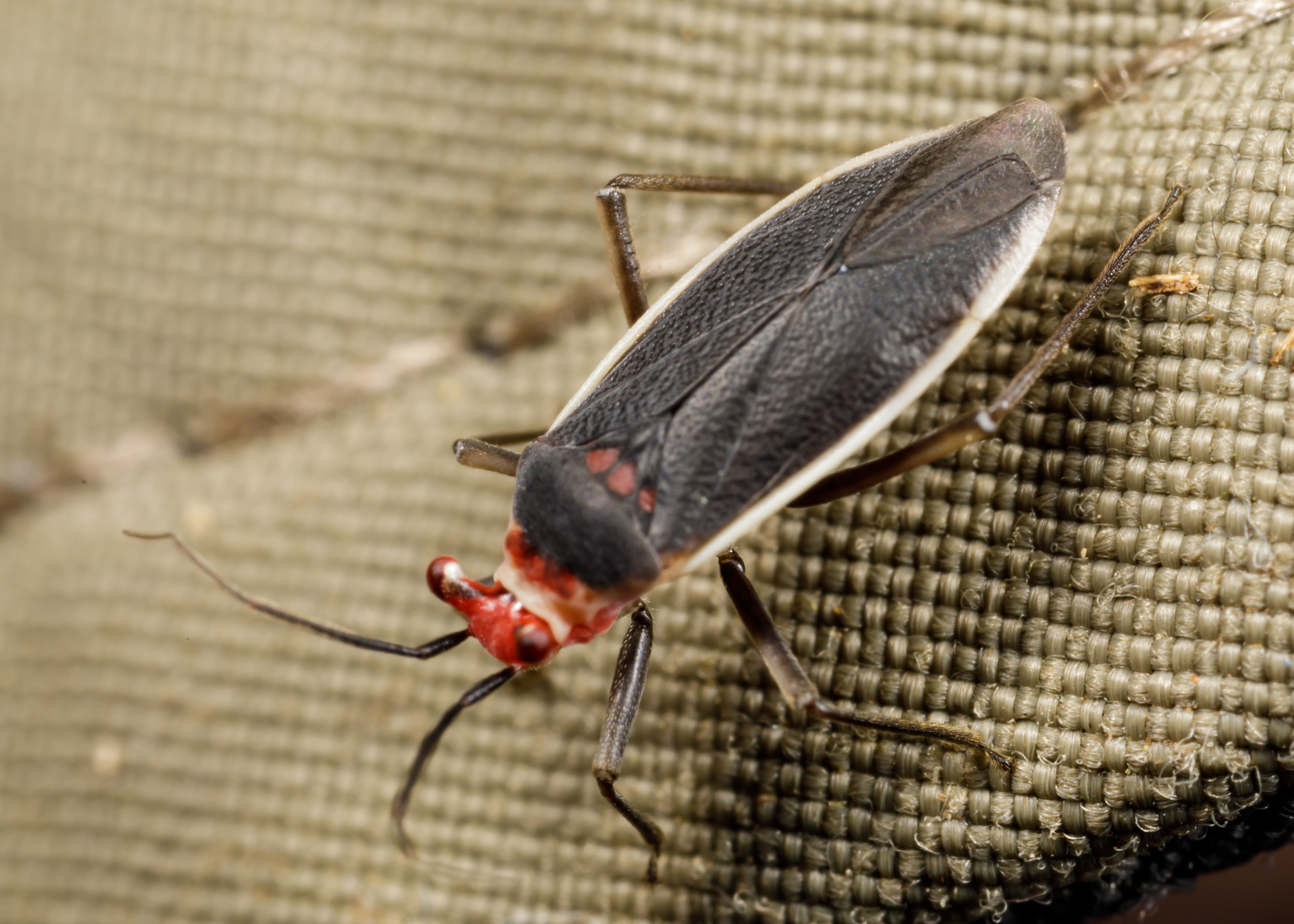
- Hesperolabops gelastops

Scientific classification
- Kingdom: Animalia
- Phylum: Arthropoda
- Clade: Pancrustacea
- Class: Insecta
- Order: Hemiptera
- Suborder: Heteroptera
- Family: Miridae
- Subfamily: Bryocorinae
- Tribe: Eccritotarsini
- Genus: Hesperolabops; Kirkaldy, 1902

Synonyms
- Stylopidea Hunter, 1912

= Hesperolabops =

Genus of true bugs

Hesperolabops is a genus of plant bugs in the family Miridae. There are about nine described species in Hesperolabops.

== Species ==
These nine species belong to the genus Hesperolabops:

- Hesperolabops cereus Schaffner & Carvalho, 1981
- Hesperolabops gelastops Kirkaldy, 1902 (cactus bug)
- Hesperolabops mexica Froeschner, 1967
- Hesperolabops murrayi Schaffner & Carvalho, 1981
- Hesperolabops nigriceps Reuter, 1908
- Hesperolabops periscopis Knight, 1928
- Hesperolabops sanguineus Reuter, 1908
- Hesperolabops spinosus Carvalho, 1984
- Hesperolabops zapotitlanensis Schaffner & Carvalho, 1981
