= Pachypoda =

Scientific classification
- Domain: Eukaryota
- Kingdom: Animalia
- Phylum: Arthropoda
- Class: Insecta
- Order: Hemiptera
- Suborder: Heteroptera
- Family: Miridae
- Subfamily: Bryocorinae
- Tribe: Eccritotarsini
- Genus: Pachypoda; Carvalho & China, 1951

Genus of insects

Pachypoda is a genus of Central American capsid bugs in the subfamily Bryocorinae and the tribe Eccritotarsini, erected by Carvalho & China in 1951.

== Species ==
GBIF includes:

1. Pachypoda chiamborazensis Carvalho, 1990
2. Pachypoda costaricensis Carvalho, 1990
3. Pachypoda guatemalensis Carvalho & China, 1951
4. Pachypoda major Carvalho, 1985
5. Pachypoda mundula (Stal, 1862)
6. Pachypoda sordida Carvalho & China, 1951
7. Pachypoda turrialba Carvalho, 1985
8. Pachypoda vultuosa (Distant, 1893)
