= Caulotops barberi =

Scientific classification
- Kingdom: Animalia
- Phylum: Arthropoda
- Clade: Pancrustacea
- Class: Insecta
- Order: Hemiptera
- Suborder: Heteroptera
- Family: Miridae
- Genus: Caulotops
- Species: C. barberi

Binomial name
- Caulotops barberi Knight, 1926

Species of insect

Caulotops barberi is a species of plant bug in the family Miridae. It is found in North America.

It is a pest to the agave plant and other succulents.
