= Caulotops =

Scientific classification
- Kingdom: Animalia
- Phylum: Arthropoda
- Clade: Pancrustacea
- Class: Insecta
- Order: Hemiptera
- Suborder: Heteroptera
- Family: Miridae
- Subfamily: Bryocorinae
- Tribe: Eccritotarsini
- Genus: Caulotops; Bergroth, 1898

Genus of true bugs

Caulotops is a genus of plant bugs in the family Miridae. There are about eight described species in Caulotops.

== Species ==
These eight species belong to the genus Caulotops:

- Caulotops agavis Reuter, 1909
- Caulotops barberi Knight, 1926
- Caulotops cyaneipennis Reuter, 1908
- Caulotops distanti (Reuter, 1905)
- Caulotops nigrus Carvalho, 1985
- Caulotops platensis (Berg, 1883)
- Caulotops puncticollis Bergroth, 1898
- Caulotops tibiopallidus Carvalho, 1985
