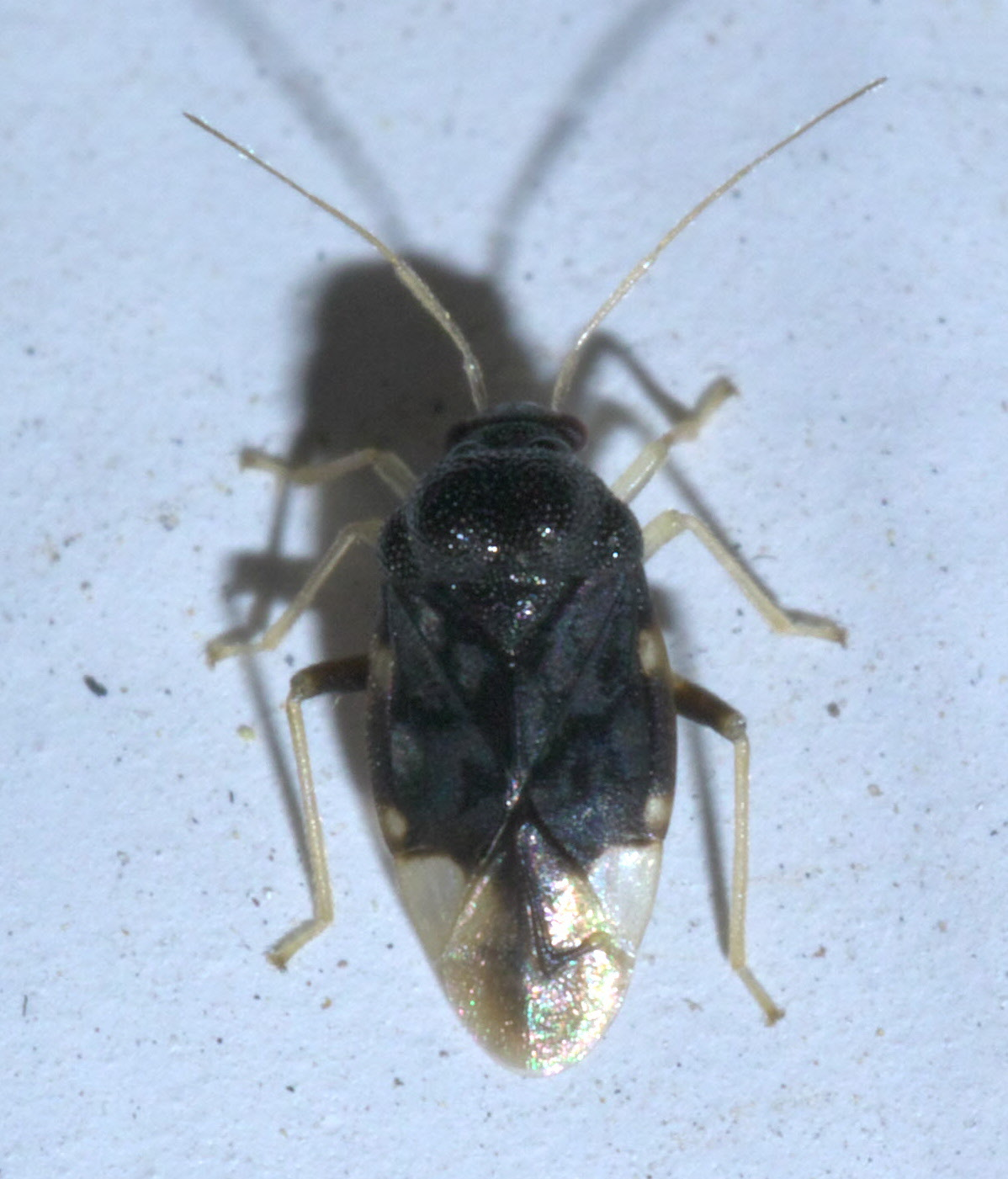

Scientific classification
- Kingdom: Animalia
- Phylum: Arthropoda
- Clade: Pancrustacea
- Class: Insecta
- Order: Hemiptera
- Suborder: Heteroptera
- Family: Miridae
- Subfamily: Bryocorinae
- Tribe: Eccritotarsini
- Genus: Pycnoderes; Guérin-Méneville, 1857

= Pycnoderes =

Genus of true bugs

Pycnoderes is a genus of plant bugs in the family Miridae. There are more than 50 described species in Pycnoderes.

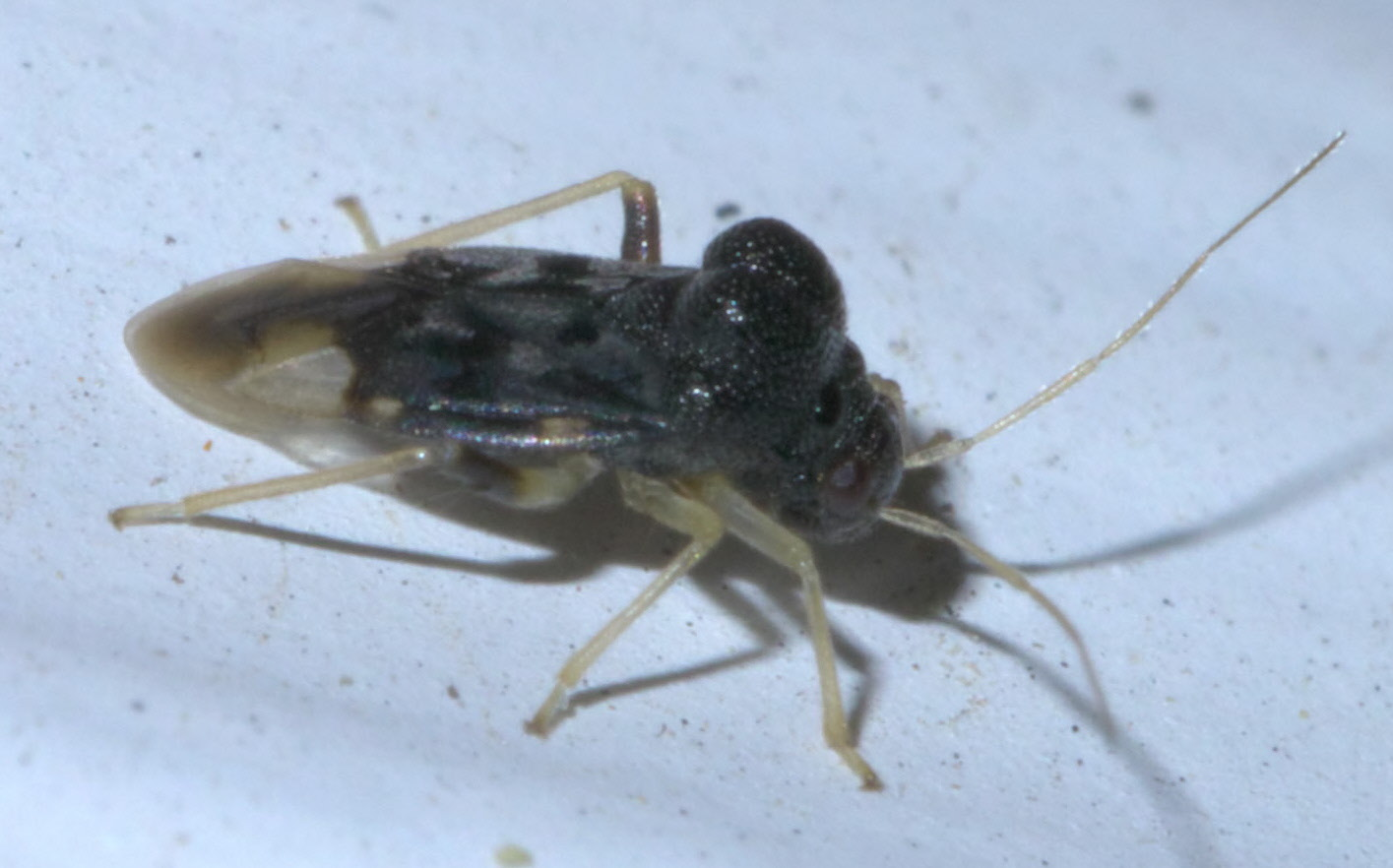

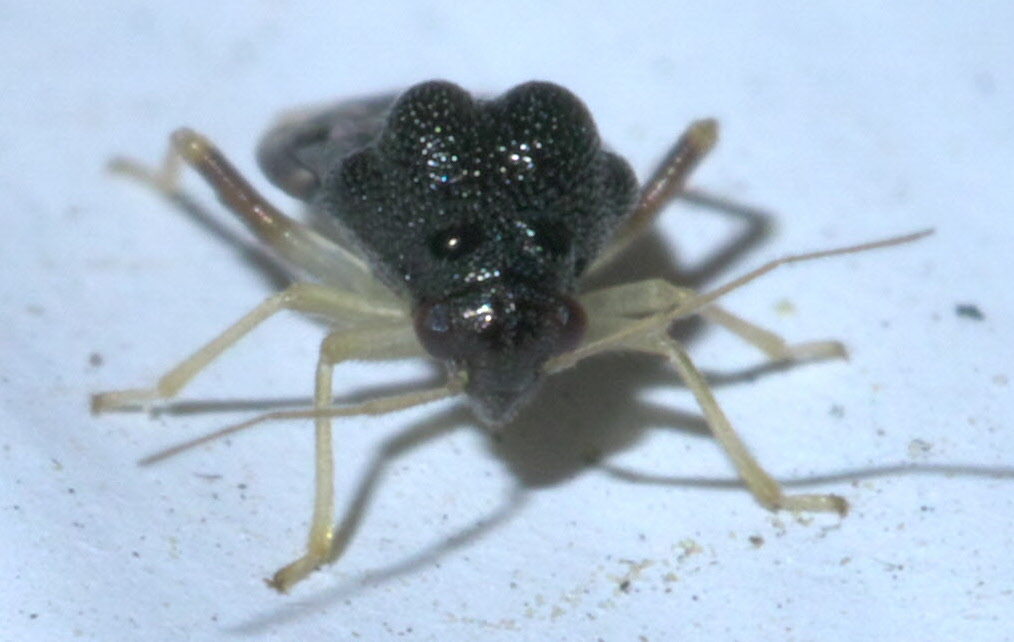

== Species ==
These 56 species belong to the genus Pycnoderes:

- Pycnoderes albicornis Reuter, 1905
- Pycnoderes albipes (Berg, 1892)
- Pycnoderes amapaensis Carvalho, 1985
- Pycnoderes angustatus Reuter, 1907
- Pycnoderes antioquiensis Carvalho, 1988
- Pycnoderes ararensis Carvalho, 1988
- Pycnoderes atratus (Distant, 1884)
- Pycnoderes balli Knight, 1926
- Pycnoderes brasiliensis Carvalho & Gomes, 1971
- Pycnoderes cataguasensis Carvalho, 1988
- Pycnoderes centralis Carvalho, 1990
- Pycnoderes chanchamayanus Carvalho, 1991
- Pycnoderes chimborazensis Carvalho, 1985
- Pycnoderes chinchinaensis Carvalho, 1988
- Pycnoderes columbiensis Carvalho, 1985
- Pycnoderes convexicollis Blatchley, 1926
- Pycnoderes cuneomaculatus Carvalho, 1985
- Pycnoderes dilatatus Reuter, 1909
- Pycnoderes drakei Knight, 1926
- Pycnoderes ecuadorensis Carvalho & Gomes, 1971
- Pycnoderes emboliatus Carvalho, 1985
- Pycnoderes explanatus Carvalho & Rosas, 1962
- Pycnoderes gabrieli Carvalho, 1988
- Pycnoderes gibbus (Distant, 1884)
- Pycnoderes grandis Carvalho, 1985
- Pycnoderes guaranianus Carvalho & Gomes, 1971
- Pycnoderes heidemanni Reuter, 1912
- Pycnoderes iguazuensis Carvalho & Carpintero, 1986
- Pycnoderes impavidus (Distant, 1893)
- Pycnoderes incurvus (Distant, 1884)
- Pycnoderes infuscatus Knight, 1926
- Pycnoderes itatiaiensis Carvalho, 1980
- Pycnoderes jamaicensis Carvalho, 1985
- Pycnoderes leucopus (Stål, 1860)
- Pycnoderes lojaensis Carvalho, 1988
- Pycnoderes manabiensis Carvalho, 1985
- Pycnoderes martiniquensis Carvalho, 1988
- Pycnoderes medius Knight, 1926
- Pycnoderes misionensis Carvalho & Carpintero, 1990
- Pycnoderes monticulifer Reuter, 1908
- Pycnoderes nicaraguensis Carvalho, 1987
- Pycnoderes obliquatus Reuter, 1908
- Pycnoderes obscuratus Knight, 1926
- Pycnoderes oranensis Carvalho & Carpintero, 1990
- Pycnoderes pallidirostris (Stål, 1862)
- Pycnoderes palustris Carvalho, 1951
- Pycnoderes peruanus Carvalho, 1991
- Pycnoderes pucalensis Carvalho, 1988
- Pycnoderes quadrimaculatus Guérin-Méneville, 1857 (bean capsid)
- Pycnoderes similaris Hernandez & Henry, 2010
- Pycnoderes simoni (Reuter, 1892)
- Pycnoderes sixeonotoides Carvalho & Hussey, 1954
- Pycnoderes tobagoensis Carvalho, 1985
- Pycnoderes vanduzeei Reuter, 1907
- Pycnoderes venezuelanus Carvalho, 1985
- Pycnoderes venustus (Stål, 1860)
