= Sixeonotus tenebrosus =

Scientific classification
- Domain: Eukaryota
- Kingdom: Animalia
- Phylum: Arthropoda
- Class: Insecta
- Order: Hemiptera
- Suborder: Heteroptera
- Family: Miridae
- Genus: Sixeonotus
- Species: S. tenebrosus

Binomial name
- Sixeonotus tenebrosus (Distant, 1893)

Species of true bug

Sixeonotus tenebrosus is a species of plant bug in the family Miridae.
