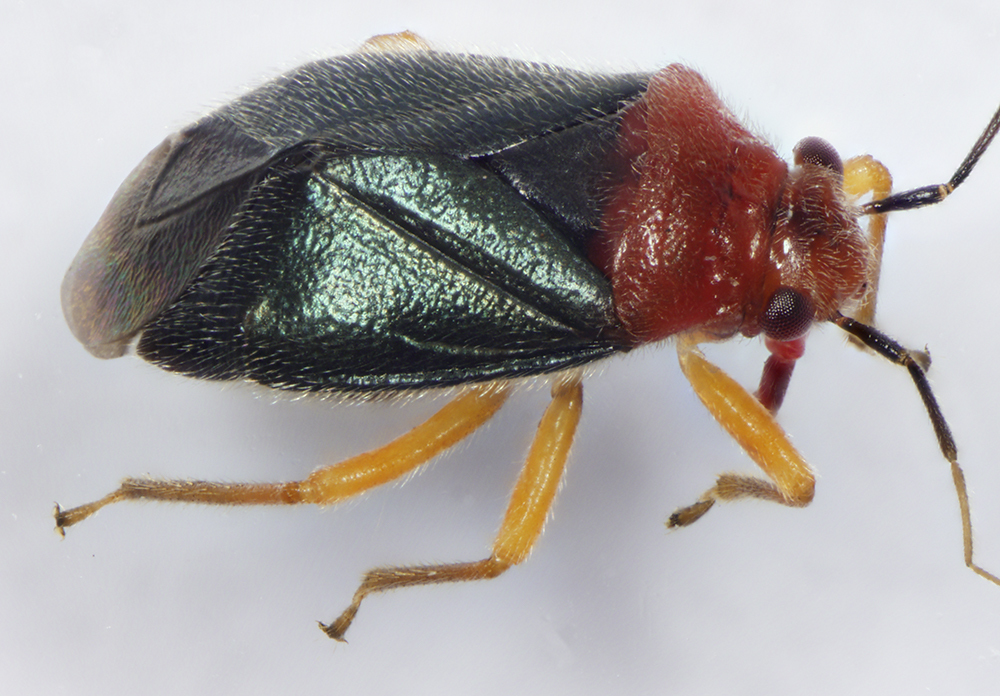
- Halticotoma valida

Scientific classification
- Kingdom: Animalia
- Phylum: Arthropoda
- Clade: Pancrustacea
- Class: Insecta
- Order: Hemiptera
- Suborder: Heteroptera
- Family: Miridae
- Subfamily: Bryocorinae
- Tribe: Eccritotarsini
- Genus: Halticotoma; Townsend, 1892

= Halticotoma =

Genus of true bugs

Halticotoma is a genus of plant bugs in the family Miridae. There are about six described species in Halticotoma.

== Species ==
These six species belong to the genus Halticotoma:

- Halticotoma andrei Knight, 1968
- Halticotoma brunnea Knight, 1968
- Halticotoma cornifer Knight, 1928
- Halticotoma cornifera Knight, 1928
- Halticotoma nicholi Knight, 1928
- Halticotoma valida Townsend, 1892 (yucca plant bug)
