= Eccritotarsus catarinensis =

Scientific classification
- Kingdom: Animalia
- Phylum: Arthropoda
- Clade: Pancrustacea
- Class: Insecta
- Order: Hemiptera
- Suborder: Heteroptera
- Family: Miridae
- Genus: Eccritotarsus
- Species: E. catarinensis

Binomial name
- Eccritotarsus catarinensis (Carvalho, 1948)

Synonyms
- Pseudobryocoris catarinensis Carvalho, 1948

Species of fly

Eccritotarsus catarinensis is a species of plant bug from Santa Catarina, Brazil. It is a sap-feeding mirid that removes a considerable amount of chlorophyll from water hyacinth (Eichhornia crassipes, Pontederiaceae).

Eccritotarsus catarinensis has been used as a biological control agent on water hyacinth in several African countries and China. E. catarinensis was considered for release in Australia, but rejected due to potential impact on native Monochoria vaginalis. E. catarinensis is being considered for release in the United States, as existing biological control agents have not yet controlled invasive water hyacinth.

Eccritotarsus catarinensis was first collected for biocontrol testing by Stephan Neser of the South African Plant Protection Research Institute. According to Hill et al. 1999 he found it in Santa Catarina state of Brazil. Its herbivory may have been noticed earlier however, by Bennett and Zwolfer in 1968 in Guyana, Suriname and/or Brazil.
