= Eccritotarsus =

Scientific classification
- Domain: Eukaryota
- Kingdom: Animalia
- Phylum: Arthropoda
- Class: Insecta
- Order: Hemiptera
- Suborder: Heteroptera
- Family: Miridae
- Tribe: Eccritotarsini
- Genus: Eccritotarsus; Stal, 1860

Genus of true bugs

Eccritotarsus is a genus of Miridae tribe Eccritotarsini, found in the Americas.

== Partial species list ==
- Eccritotarsus catarinensis Carvalho
- Eccritotarsus pilosus Carvalho and Gomes, 1971
- Eccritotarsus pallidirostris Stal
- Eccritotarsus incurvus Distant
