= Sixeonotus =

Scientific classification
- Kingdom: Animalia
- Phylum: Arthropoda
- Clade: Pancrustacea
- Class: Insecta
- Order: Hemiptera
- Suborder: Heteroptera
- Family: Miridae
- Subfamily: Bryocorinae
- Tribe: Eccritotarsini
- Genus: Sixeonotus; Reuter, 1876

Genus of true bugs

Sixeonotus is a genus of plant bugs in the family Miridae. There are more than 30 described species in Sixeonotus.

== Species ==
These 36 species belong to the genus Sixeonotus:

- Sixeonotus acuminatus Carvalho & Carpintero, 1986
- Sixeonotus albicornis Blatchley, 1926
- Sixeonotus albohirtus Knight, 1926
- Sixeonotus andinus Carvalho & Gomes, 1971
- Sixeonotus areolatus Knight, 1928
- Sixeonotus basicornis Knight, 1928
- Sixeonotus bebbiae Knight, 1968
- Sixeonotus brailovskyi Carvalho, 1985
- Sixeonotus brasiliensis Carvalho & Gomes, 1971
- Sixeonotus brevirostris Knight, 1928
- Sixeonotus brevis Knight, 1926
- Sixeonotus capitatus Carvalho & Carpintero, 1986
- Sixeonotus carmelitanus Carvalho, 1990
- Sixeonotus chapadensis Carvalho & Carpintero, 1986
- Sixeonotus deflatus Knight, 1926
- Sixeonotus dextratus Knight, 1928
- Sixeonotus gracilis Blatchley, 1928
- Sixeonotus insignis Reuter, 1876
- Sixeonotus jujuiensis Carvalho & Carpintero, 1990
- Sixeonotus manauara Carvalho, 1985
- Sixeonotus minensis Carvalho, 1985
- Sixeonotus moestus Reuter, 1908
- Sixeonotus morio Reuter, 1908
- Sixeonotus nicaraguensis Carvalho, 1990
- Sixeonotus nicholi Knight, 1928
- Sixeonotus nocturnus (Distant, 1893)
- Sixeonotus perobscurus (Distant, 1893)
- Sixeonotus pusillus Knight, 1928
- Sixeonotus recurvatus Knight, 1929
- Sixeonotus rostratus Knight, 1928
- Sixeonotus rubellus Reuter, 1908
- Sixeonotus saltensis Carvalho & Carpintero, 1986
- Sixeonotus scabrosus (Uhler, 1895)
- Sixeonotus strigatifrons Reuter, 1908
- Sixeonotus tenebrosus (Distant, 1893)
- Sixeonotus unicolor Knight, 1928
