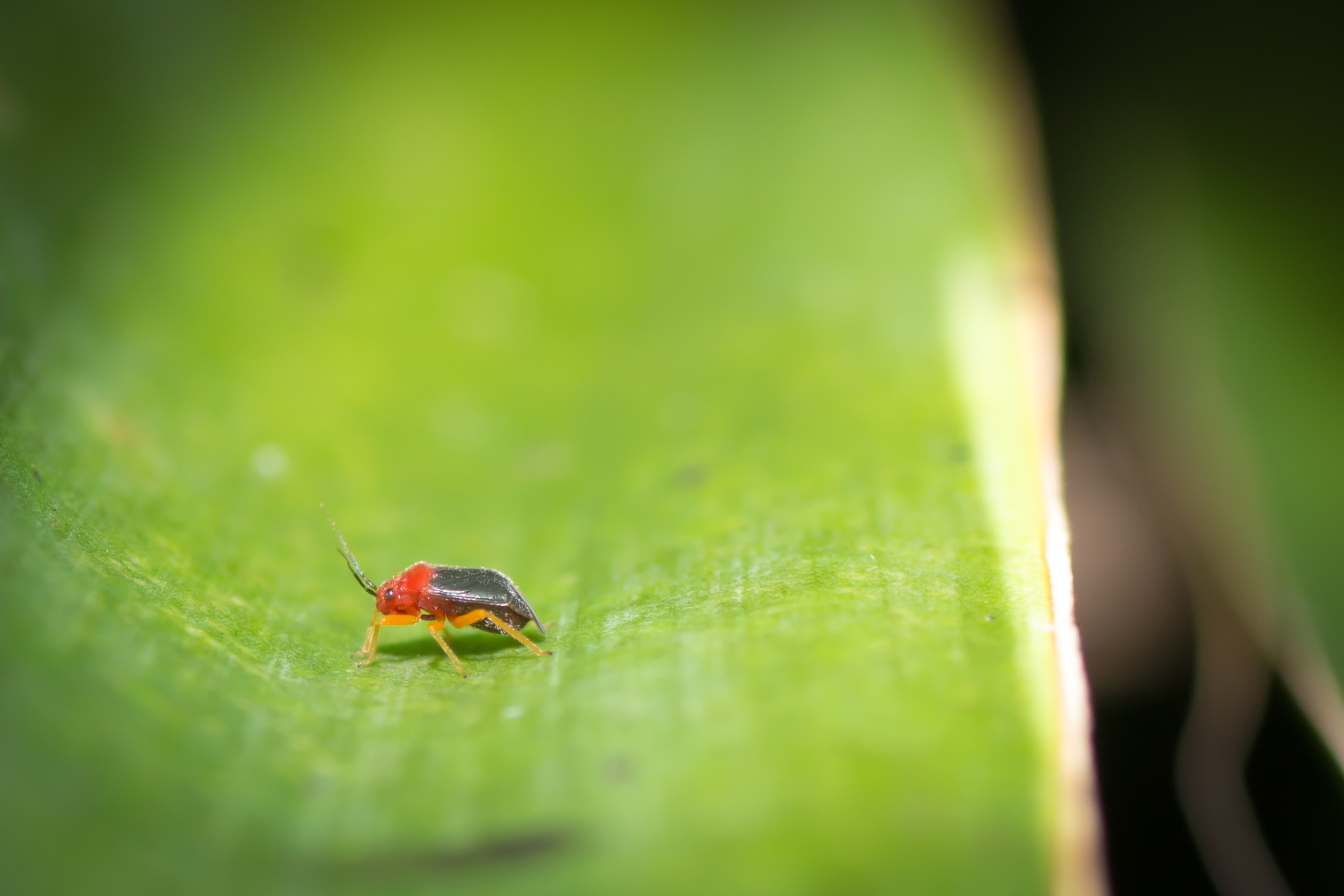
- Halticotoma valida

Scientific classification
- Domain: Eukaryota
- Kingdom: Animalia
- Phylum: Arthropoda
- Class: Insecta
- Order: Hemiptera
- Suborder: Heteroptera
- Family: Miridae
- Subfamily: Bryocorinae
- Tribe: Eccritotarsini; Berg, 1884

= Eccritotarsini =

Tribe of true bugs

Eccritotarsini is a tribe of plant bugs in the family Miridae. There are about 14 genera and at least 40 described species in Eccritotarsini.

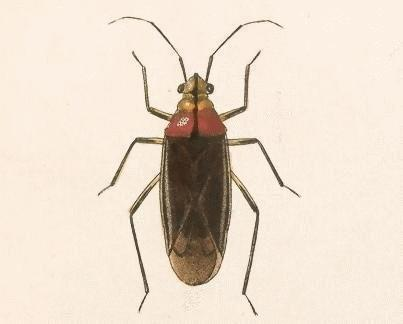
Sysinas linearis

== Genera ==
These 14 genera belong to the tribe Eccritotarsini:

- Aguayomiris Maldonado Caprilles, 1987^{c g b}
- Caulotops Bergroth, 1898^{i c g b}
- Cyrtocapsus Reuter, 1876^{i c g}
- Eccritotarsus Stal, 1860
- Halticotoma Townsend, 1892^{i c g b}
- Hemisphaerodella Reuter, 1908^{i g}
- Hesperolabops Kirkaldy, 1902^{i c g b}
- Mertila Distant, 1904^{i c g}
- Pachypoda Carvalho and China, 1951^{i c g}
- Pycnoderes Guérin-Méneville, 1857^{i c g b}
- Pycnoderiella Henry, 1993^{i c g}
- Sixeonotopsis Carvalho and Schaffner, 1974^{i c g}
- Sixeonotus Reuter, 1876^{i c g b}
- Sysinas Distant, 1883^{i c g}
- Tenthecoris Scott, 1886^{i c g}

Data sources: i = ITIS, c = Catalogue of Life, g = GBIF, b = Bugguide.net
